= List of Professional Bowlers Association awards =

The Professional Bowlers Association (PBA) hands out four awards to honor tour competitors for their accomplishments both on and off the lanes after each PBA Tour season.

No awards were given in 2001, as the PBA transitioned from a calendar year format to a "seasonal" (September to March) format, one of the league's many changes as a result of the PBA's sale in March 2000. In 2014, the PBA returned to a calendar year format for each tour season.

== Chris Schenkel PBA Player of the Year ==
This award was voted by writers of The Sporting News from 1963 to 1970. Since 1971 (with the exception of 2008 to 2010, when the winner was determined by season points only), the award has been voted on by the players and media. In 1999, the PBA named the award after the long-time play-by-play television announcer for the Professional Bowlers Tour, Chris Schenkel of ABC Sports.

Billy Hardwick was the first to win the PBA Player of the Year ("POY") award in 1963, and is still the youngest ever (age 22) to win the award. Hardwick was also the first to win it a second time (1963, 69). Earl Anthony was the first to win POY a 3rd, 4th, 5th and 6th time (1974–76 & 81–83), while Walter Ray Williams Jr was the first to win a 7th POY award (1986, '93, '96–98, 2003, '10). His award at age 50 in 2010 made him the oldest ever to win the award.

A handful of PBA pros have won PBA Player of the Year four or more times: Williams Jr 7x (1986, 93, 96–98, 2003, 10), Jason Belmonte 7x (2013–15, 17, 19–20, 22), Anthony 6x (1974–76 & 81–83), E. J. Tackett 5x (2016, 23–26), and Mark Roth 4x (1977–79, 84).

Don Johnson was the first bowler to win the PBA Player of Year award in consecutive seasons (1971–72). Only five bowlers have won the Player of the Year award in three consecutive seasons, with only one of them doing it twice: Anthony (1974–76 & 1981–83), Roth (1977–79), Williams Jr (1996–98), Belmonte (2013–15), and Tackett (2023–25). Tackett is the only bowler to have won the Player of the Year award in four consecutive seasons (2023–26).

Season	Bowler	Nationality	# of Wins	Notes
1963	Billy Hardwick	United States	4	Won PBA National Championship. Youngest player (22) to win this award to date.
1964	Bob Strampe	United States	1 (Note: Shows official title count at the time. In 2008, BPAA All-Star titles in the PBA era (before 1971) and ABC Masters titles prior to 1998 were retroactively counted as PBA titles if won by a PBA member.)	Won PBA National Championship and BPAA All-Star. Leading money winner.
1965	Dick Weber	United States	2	Won BPAA All-Star and George Young High Average Award (211.90)
1966	Wayne Zahn	United States	3	Won Tournament of Champions and PBA National Championship. George Young High Average Award (208.66)
1967	Dave Davis	United States	6	Won PBA National Championship
1968	Jim Stefanich	United States	5	Leading money winner. Won BPAA All-Star.
1969	Billy Hardwick (2)	United States	6	Won BPAA All-Star and George Young High Average Award (212.96†)
1970	Nelson Burton Jr.	United States	4	George Young High Average Award (214.91†)
1971	Don Johnson	United States	6	First year awarded by player vote. Won George Young High Average Award (213.98)
1972	Don Johnson (2)	United States	3	Won BPAA U.S. Open and George Young High Average Award (215.29†)
1973	Don McCune	United States	6	10-time finalist and leading money winner.
1974	Earl Anthony	United States	6	Won Tournament of Champions, PBA National Championship, and George Young High Average Award (219.39†)
1975	Earl Anthony (2)	United States	7	Won PBA National Championship. George Young High Average Award (219.06). Leading money winner and first player in PBA history to eclipse $100,000 in season earnings.
1976	Earl Anthony (3)	United States	6	Leading money winner, 2nd consecutive $100,000 season.
1977	Mark Roth	United States	4	George Young High Average Award (218.17) and leading money winner.
1978	Mark Roth (2)	United States	8	George Young High Average Award (219.83†) and leading money winner. PBA record 8 wins in a season.
1979	Mark Roth (3)	United States	6	George Young High Average Award (221.66†)
1980	Wayne Webb	United States	3	Won Tournament of Champions. Leading money winner.
1981	Earl Anthony (4)	United States	4	Won PBA National Championship.
1982	Earl Anthony (5)	United States	3	Won PBA National Championship. First to surpass $1,000,000 in career earnings.
1983	Earl Anthony (6)	United States	2	Won 6th career PBA National Championship. George Young High Average Award (216.65)
1984	Mark Roth (4)	United States	4	Won BPAA U.S. Open and PBA Touring Players Championship
1985	Mike Aulby	United States	6	Won PBA National Championship. First to win $200,000 in a single season.
1986	Walter Ray Williams Jr.	United States	3	9-time finalist
1987	Marshall Holman	United States	0	First and only player to win award without a tournament victory. (Current rules now require at least one title to be eligible.) 3-time tournament runner-up. George Young High Average Award winner (216.80)
1988	Brian Voss	United States	2	Won PBA National Championship. Leading money winner with then-record $225,485.
1989	Amleto Monacelli	Venezuela	4	Won PBA Touring Players Championship. Harry Smith Points Leader Award winner. First player born outside the US to win award.
1990	Amleto Monacelli (2)	Venezuela	3	George Young High Average Award winner (218.16)
1991	David Ozio	United States	4	Won the Tournament of Champions. Leading money winner.
1992	Dave Ferraro	United States	2	Harry Smith Points Leader and George Young High Average (219.70) Award winner. Cashed in 26 of 28 events bowled.
1993	Walter Ray Williams Jr. (2)	United States	7	George Young High Average Award winner (222.98†) and leading money winner.
1994	Norm Duke	United States	5	Won the Tournament of Champions. George Young High Average Award (222.83) and leading money winner.
1995	Mike Aulby (2)	United States	1	Won the Tournament of Champions. George Young High Average Award (225.49†). Leading money winner.
1996	Walter Ray Williams Jr. (3)	United States	5	George Young High Average Award Winner (225.37) and leading money winner.
1997	Walter Ray Williams Jr. (4)	United States	3	George Young High Average Award Winner (222.95)
1998	Walter Ray Williams Jr. (5)	United States	5	Won the BPAA U.S. Open. George Young High Average Award Winner (226.13†)
1999	Parker Bohn III	United States	5	George Young High Average Award Winner (228.04†), leading money winner, cashed in 20 of 24 events.
2000	Norm Duke (2)	United States	3	Won PBA National Championship
2002 (Note: No 2001 award as PBA changed to a fall-spring seasonal format.)	Parker Bohn III (2)	United States	5	Won 2001 ABC Masters. George Young High Average Award (221.08)
2003	Walter Ray Williams Jr. (6)	United States	3	Won BPAA U.S. Open and PBA World Championship. George Young High Average Award (221.08) and leading money winner with a then-record $419,700.
2004	Mika Koivuniemi	Finland	2	7-time finalist. Won George Young High Average Award (222.73). Second international player (after Monacelli) and first European to win award.
2005	Patrick Allen	United States	3	Top-five finish in all four majors. Won PBA World Championship. Led tour in earnings.
2006	Tommy Jones	United States	4	Won the BPAA U.S. Open. Also won Rookie of the Year.
2007	Doug Kent	United States	2	Won USBC Masters and PBA World Championship. Leading money winner.
2008	Chris Barnes	United States	2	First award based on points system.
2009	Wes Malott	United States	3	8-time finalist. George Young High Average Award (222.98)
2010	Walter Ray Williams Jr. (7)	United States	2	Won USBC Masters. George Young High Average Award (222.89). Tour earnings leader. Oldest player (50) to win this award.
2011	Mika Koivuniemi (2)	Finland	1	Won Tournament of Champions. George Young High Average Award (222.50). Award went back to voting.
2012	Sean Rash	United States	1	Won Tournament of Champions. George Young High Average Award (228.13). Harry Smith Point Leader Award.
2013	Jason Belmonte	Australia	3	Won USBC Masters and George Young High Average Award (228.81†).
2014	Jason Belmonte (2)	Australia	3	Won Tournament of Champions, USBC Masters, George Young High Average Award, and Harry Smith Point Leader Award
2015	Jason Belmonte (3)	Australia	2	Won Tournament of Champions and USBC Masters. Best Bowler ESPY Award.
2016	E.J. Tackett	United States	4	Won PBA World Championship
2017	Jason Belmonte (4)	Australia	4	Won PBA Players Championship, USBC Masters, and PBA World Championship. George Young High Average Award (229.39†)
2018	Andrew Anderson	United States	2	Won USBC Masters. 2-time runner-up. Third at Tournament of Champions.
2019	Jason Belmonte (5)	Australia	4	Won Tournament of Champions and PBA World Championship.
2020	Jason Belmonte (6)	Australia	3	Won U.S. Open and PBA World Championship.
2021	Kyle Troup	United States	2	Won PBA Players Championship. Tour earnings leader with record $496,900. Harry Smith PBA Points Leader.
2022	Jason Belmonte (7)	Australia	5	Won PBA Players Championship. Harry Smith PBA Points Leader.
2023	E.J. Tackett (2)	United States	5	Won U.S. Open and 2nd PBA World Championship. Earned George Young High Average Award (227.18) and Harry Smith PBA Points Leader Award.
2024	E.J. Tackett (3)	United States	2	Won 3rd PBA World Championship. Earned George Young High Average Award (229.37) and Harry Smith PBA Points Leader Award.
2025	E.J. Tackett (4)	United States	4	Won 2nd U.S. Open and 4th PBA World Championship. Led tour in earnings (record 2nd $400K+ season). Earned Harry Smith PBA Points Leader Award. Won 4th consecutive George Young High Average Award (228.60), tying Mark Roth (1976–79) as only players to win four in a row.
2026	E.J. Tackett (5)	United States	1	Only player to win POY four seasons in a row. Won 5th PBA World Championship, 4th consecutive. Earned top seed in three majors. Led tour in earnings. Earned Harry Smith PBA Points Leader Award. Won 5th consecutive George Young High Average Award (229.78†); only player to win five in a row.

† - Broke previous High Average record.

== Harry Golden PBA Rookie of the Year ==
Candidates receive votes for this honor by PBA members and media. In 1992, this award was renamed in honor of Harry Golden, longtime PBA tournament director.

Season	Bowler	Nationality	Notes
1964	Jerry McCoy	United States	Won the Seattle Coca-Cola PBA Open. 3-time runner-up.
1965	Jim Godman	United States	Finished in 3rd at the PBA Oxnard Open.
1966	Bobby Cooper	United States	Cashed in 9 tournaments.
1967	Mike Durbin	United States	Won the Tampa Bay-Sertoma Open and Youngstown Open. Finished 4th at the Tournament of Champions.
1968	Bob McGregor	United States	
1969	Larry Lichstein	United States	Runner-up at Bellows-Valvair Open. Finished 3rd at the PBA National Championship.
1970	Denny Krick	United States	Cashed in 17 tournaments
1971	Tye Critchlow	United States	
1972	Tommy Hudson	United States	Qualified for match play in 4 of the first 6 tournaments he entered.
1973	Steve Neff	United States	Cashed in 21 or 27 events bowled
1974	Cliff McNealy	United States	
1975	Guy Rowbury	United States	Runner-up at Tucson Open.
1976	Mike Berlin	United States	Won the AMF Regional Champions Classic.
1977	Steve Martin	United States	
1978	Joseph Groskind	United States	Runner-up at the PBA National Championship.
1979	Mike Aulby	United States	Won the PBA National Championship (def. Earl Anthony). Runner-up at Amarillo Open.
1980	Pete Weber	United States	Finished 4th at Long Island Open
1981	Mark Fahy	United States	Finished 5th at Fair Lanes Open and 4th at Showboat Doubles Classic (with Pete Weber)
1982	Mike Steinbach	United States	Finished 5th at Miller High Life Open and 4th at Showboat Doubles Classic (with Bill Spigner)
1983	Toby Contreras	United States	Won AC-Delco Classic
1984	John Gant	United States	Won the Denver Open. Finished 5th at the Miller High Life Classic.
1985	Tom Crites	United States	Finished 4th at the Denver Open.
1986	Marc McDowell	United States	Runner-up at Ebonite-Firebolt Open. 3rd place at King Louie Open.
1987	Ryan Shafer	United States	Reached match play in 5 events.
1988	Rick Steelsmith	United States	Runner-up at Miller Lite Classic. Cashed in 10 of 15 events.
1989	Steve Hoskins	United States	Finished 4th at Showboat Atlantic City Open. Cashed in 17 events.
1990	Brad Kiszewski	United States	5th place finish at Chevy Trucks Classic. Cashed in 16 events.
1991	Ricky Ward	United States	3rd place finish at El Paso Open. Cashed in 10 events.
1992	Jason Couch	United States	3rd place finish at Columbia 300 Open and Quaker State Open. Led rookies in earnings and cashes.
1993	Mark Scroggins	United States	5th place finish at Tucson Open. Cashed in 9 total events.
1994	Tony Ament Jr.	United States	Led rookies in earnings, cashes, and match play appearances.
1995	Billy Myers Jr.	United States	Led rookies in earnings and average (215.70). Finished 3rd at the Brunswick Johnny Petraglia Open and 5th at the Indianapolis Open.
1996	C.K. Moore	United States	Rolled a perfect game in his TV debut en route to winning the Columbia 300 Open.
1997	Anthony Lombardo	United States	Led tour rookies in earnings (over $20,000)
1998	Chris Barnes	United States	Reached match play in 12 events.
1999	Paul Fleming	United States	National/Senior Tour Doubles runner-up with Dale Eagle. Led all rookies in match play appearances (6) and average (215.86).
2000	Joe Ciccone	United States	Garnered 86% of the votes. Led rookies in average (210.50)
2002	Tommy Jones	United States	3rd place at PBA Orleans Casino Open; Top rookie in earnings ($45,440) and points.
2003	Brad Angelo	United States	Reached match play in 18 events with a 217 average.
2004	Chris Johnson	United States	PBA Toledo Open runner-up
2005	Not awarded		
2006	Bill O'Neill	United States	Greater Omaha Classic runner-up
2007	Billy Oatman	United States	Motel 6 Classic runner-up
2008	Rhino Page	United States	Won The Go RVing Classic
2009	Jason Belmonte	Australia	Won The Bowling Foundation Long Island Classic
2010	Anthony LaCaze	United States	Won the Earl Anthony Memorial Classic
2011	Scott Norton	United States	Won the World Series of Bowling - Chameleon Championship
2012	Josh Blanchard	United States	3rd place - PBA Cheetah Open presented by Ebonite
2013	E.J. Tackett	United States	4th place - Lucas Oil PBA Wolf Open
2014	Marshall Kent	United States	Won two championships (one as an amateur, one as a PBA member)
2015	Jesper Svensson	Sweden	Won two titles, including PBA Chameleon Championship
2016	François Lavoie	Canada	Won U.S. Open and PBA Shark Championship
2017	Matt Sanders	United States	Won the PBA Xtra Frame Billy Hardwick Memorial Open
2018	Kamron Doyle	United States	Finished 3rd in the Xtra Frame Gene Carter's Pro Shop Classic
2019	Mykel Holliman	United States	Runner-up at USBC Masters
2020	Not awarded due to COVID-19		
2021	Matt Russo	United States	Won the PBA Jonesboro Open.
2022	Santtu Tahvanainen	Finland	Led all first-year bowlers in earnings and average.
2023	Cortez Schenck	United States	Led all first-year bowlers in points, earnings and average.
2024	Nate Purches	United States	Led all first-year bowlers in points, earnings and average.
2025	Ryan Barnes	United States	Led all first-year bowlers in points and earnings. Set rookie earnings record ($113,502) and became first rookie to qualify for the PBA Playoffs since the event's 2019 inception.
2026	Brandon Bonta	United States	Won PBA Players Championship with a 300 game in the title match. Led all first-year bowlers in points, average and earnings. Broke Ryan Barnes' 2025 rookie earnings record with $163,800.

== PBA Steve Nagy Sportsmanship Award ==
The PBA's sportsmanship award honors PBA founding member and Hall of Famer Steve Nagy. The award has been awarded since 1966, the year of Nagy's passing.

Season	Bowler	Nationality
1966	Johnny Guenther	United States
1967	Johnny Guenther (2)	United States
1968	Ralph Engan	United States
1969	Ralph Engan (2)	United States
1970	Johnny Guenther (3)	United States
1970	Dave Soutar	United States
1970	Dick Ritger	United States
1971	Mike Orlovsky	United States
1972	Gary Dickinson	United States
1973	Gary Dickinson (2)	United States
1973	Dick Ritger (2)	United States
1974	Gary Dickinson (3)	United States
1975	Jim Frazier	United States
1976	Tommy Hudson	United States
1976	Les Schissler	United States
1976	Les Zikes	United States
1977	Don Johnson	United States
1978	Gil Sliker	United States
1979	Alvin Lou	United States
1980	Tom Baker	United States
1981	Alvin Lou (2)	United States
1982	Sam Zurich	United States
1983	Rich Gradley	United States
1984	Jimmie Pritts Jr.	United States
1985	Steve Martin	United States
1986	Steve Martin (2)	United States
1987	Steve Martin (3)	United States
1988	Dave Husted	United States
1989	Dave Husted (2)	United States
1990	Parker Bohn III	United States
1991	Parker Bohn III (2)	United States
1992	Parker Bohn III (3)	United States
1993	Parker Bohn III (4)	United States
1994	Mike Aulby	United States
1995	Mike Aulby (2)	United States
1996	Curtis Odom	United States
1997	Rick Steelsmith	United States
1998	Tim Criss	United States
1998	Butch Soper	United States
1999	Justin Hromek	United States
2001	Justin Hromek (2)	United States
2002	Justin Hromek (3)	United States
2003	Jason Queen	United States
2004	Tim Criss (2)	United States
2005	Jason Queen (2)	United States
2006	Jack Jurek	United States
2007	Richard Wolfe	United States
2008	Riga Kalfas	United States
2009	Ryan Shafer	United States
2010	George Lambert IV	Canada
2011	Jack Jurek (2)	United States
2012	Martin Larsen	Sweden
2013	Ryan Shafer (2)	United States
2014	Brett Spangler	United States
2015	Josh Blanchard	United States
2016	Tom Smallwood	United States
2017	Chris Loschetter	United States
2018	Tom Smallwood (2)	United States
2019	Martin Larsen (2)	Sweden
2020	Brad Miller	United States
2021	Jake Peters	United States
2022	Jake Peters (2)	United States
2023	BJ Moore	United States
2024	Richie Teece	United Kingdom
2025	Deo Benard	United States

== Tony Reyes Community Service Award ==
Awarded annually to a PBA member who exemplifies extraordinary community service, charitable and/or educational contributions over the course of a tour season. Created in 2013 by the PBA to honor and continue the legacy of Tony Reyes.

Season	Bowler
2013	Parker Bohn III
2014	Missy Parkin
2015	Ed Godbout
2016	Rhino Page
2017	Del Ballard Jr.
2018	Chris Barnes
2019	Chuck Garner
2020	Danny Wiseman
2021	Warren Eales
2022	Ryan Shafer
2023	Johnny Petraglia
2024	Kyle Troup
2025	Chris Via

== Statistical Awards ==
The following awards are earned solely on statistics of the bowler, whereas the above are given based on voting by the media and PBA members.

=== George Young Memorial High Average Award ===
This award is earned by the bowler who has the highest average during a season with a minimum of 180 games bowled in PBA competition. The award is named after American Bowling Congress (ABC) Hall of Famer George Young, who had a lifetime 202 average in ABC tournament play from 1942 to 1958, the highest of any competitor during that era covering over 20 tournaments.

Season	Bowler	Average
1962	Don Carter	212.84
1963	Billy Hardwick	210.35
1964	Ray Bluth	210.51
1965	Dick Weber	211.90
1966	Wayne Zahn	208.66
1966	Wayne Zahn (2)	212.14
1967	Wayne Zahn (3)	212.14
1968	Jim Stefanich	211.90
1969	Billy Hardwick (2)	212.96
1970	Nelson Burton, Jr.	214.91
1971	Don Johnson	213.98
1972	Don Johnson (2)	215.29
1973	Earl Anthony	215.80
1974	Earl Anthony (2)	219.39
1975	Earl Anthony (3)	219.06
1976	Mark Roth	215.97
1977	Mark Roth (2)	218.17
1978	Mark Roth (3)	219.83
1979	Mark Roth (4)	221.66
1980	Earl Anthony (4)	218.54
1981	Mark Roth (5)	216.70
1982	Marshall Holman	212.84
1983	Earl Anthony (5)	216.65
1984	Marshall Holman (2)	213.91
1985	Mark Baker	213.72
1986	John Gant	214.38
1987	Marshall Holman (3)	216.80
1988	Mark Roth (6)	218.04
1989	Pete Weber	215.43
1990	Amleto Monacelli	218.16
1991	Norm Duke	218.21
1992	Dave Ferraro	219.70
1993	Walter Ray Williams Jr.	222.98
1994	Norm Duke (2)	222.83
1995	Mike Aulby	225.49
1996	Walter Ray Williams Jr. (2)	225.37
1997	Walter Ray Williams Jr. (3)	222.95
1998	Walter Ray Williams Jr. (4)	226.13
1999	Parker Bohn III	228.04
2000	Chris Barnes	220.93
2001–02	Parker Bohn III	221.08
2002–03	Walter Ray Williams Jr. (5)	224.94
2003–04	Mika Koivuniemi	222.73
2004–05	Walter Ray Williams Jr. (6)	227.07
2005–06	Norm Duke (3)	224.29
2006–07	Norm Duke (4)	228.47
2007–08	Walter Ray Williams Jr. (7)	228.34
2008–09	Wes Malott	222.98
2009–10	Walter Ray Williams Jr. (8)	222.89
2010–11	Mika Koivuniemi (2)	222.50
2011–12	Sean Rash	228.13
2012–13	Jason Belmonte	228.81
2014	Jason Belmonte (2)	226.71
2015	Jason Belmonte (3)	225.40
2016	Jesper Svensson	226.07
2017	Jason Belmonte (4)	229.39
2018	Jason Belmonte (5)	221.38
2019	Jason Belmonte (6)	225.62
2020	Not awarded	
2021	Not awarded	
2022	EJ Tackett	225.27
2023	EJ Tackett (2)	227.18
2024	EJ Tackett (3)	229.37
2025	EJ Tackett (4)	228.60
2026	EJ Tackett (5)	229.78

=== Harry Smith Point Leader Award ===
This award is given to the top points earner during a given PBA Tour season. Named after PBA charter member and inaugural hall of famer Harry Smith, who won twelve PBA titles, including two majors.

Season	Bowler
1986	Dave Husted
1987	Brian Voss
1988	Brian Voss
1989	Amleto Monacelli
1990	Amleto Monacelli
1991	John Mazza
1992	Dave Ferraro
1993	Walter Ray Williams, Jr.
1994	Walter Ray Williams, Jr.
1995	Dave D'Entremont
1996	Walter Ray Williams, Jr.
1997	Walter Ray Williams, Jr.
1998	Walter Ray Williams, Jr.
1999	Parker Bohn III
2000	Chris Barnes
2002	Parker Bohn III
2003	Walter Ray Williams, Jr.
2004	Brad Angelo
2005	Patrick Allen
2006	Norm Duke
2007	Wes Malott
2008	Walter Ray Williams, Jr.
2009	Chris Barnes
2010	Walter Ray Williams, Jr.
2011	Chris Barnes
2012	Sean Rash
2013	Jason Belmonte
2014	Jason Belmonte
2018	Andrew Anderson
2021	Kyle Troup
2022	Jason Belmonte
2023	E.J. Tackett
2024	E.J. Tackett
2025	E.J. Tackett
2026	E.J. Tackett
