= 1968 PBA Tour season =

PBA Bowling Tour: 1968 Season
- League: Professional Bowlers Association
- Sport: Ten-pin bowling
- Duration: January 2 – December 6, 1968

PBA Tour
- Season MVP: Jim Stefanich

PBA Tour seasons
- ← 1967 1969 →

This is a recap of the 1968 season for the Professional Bowlers Association (PBA) Tour. It was the tour's tenth season, and consisted of 34 events. Jim Stefanich won five titles on the season and was the Tour's leading money winner, earning him Sporting News PBA Player of the Year honors. Wayne Zahn won the PBA National Championship, while Dave Davis captured the title at the Firestone Tournament of Champions.

== Tournament schedule ==
Event	Bowling center	City	Dates	Winner
North Phoenix Open	Squaw Peak Lanes	Phoenix, Arizona	Jan 2–6	Dick Ritger (4)
Showboat Invitational	Showboat Lanes	Las Vegas, Nevada	Jan 9–13	Bill Allen (10)
San Jose Open	Saratoga Lanes	San Jose, California	Jan 16–20	Bill Allen (11)
Denver Open	Broadway Bowl	Denver, Colorado	Jan 23–27	Dave Soutar (4)
Cougar Open	King Louie West	Kansas City, Missouri	Jan 30 – Feb 3	Mike Limongello (3)
Tampa Bay-Sertoma Open	East Gate Lanes	Tampa, Florida	Feb 20–24	Jim Stefanich (5)
Buckeye Open	Imperial Lanes	Toledo, Ohio	Feb 27 – Mar 2	Jim Stefanich (6)
Miller High Life Open	Bowlero Lanes	Milwaukee, Wisconsin	Mar 5–9	Johnny Guenther (3)
Buffalo Open	Fairlanes	Buffalo, New York	Mar 12–16	Bob Strampe (4)
Ebonite Gold Cup	Echo Lanes	Mountainside, New Jersey	Mar 19–23	Teata Semiz (1)
New Orleans Lions Open	Pelican Lanes	New Orleans, Louisiana	Mar 26–30	Dick Ritger (5)
Firestone Tournament of Champions	Riviera Lanes	Akron, Ohio	Apr 1–6	Dave Davis (9)
Ebonite Invitational	Ellisville Bowl	St. Louis, Missouri	Apr 3–6	Don Glover (1)
Mobile-Sertoma Open	Florida Bowl	Mobile, Alabama	Apr 9–13	Jim Stefanich (7)
Seattle Open	Ballinger Bowl	Seattle, Washington	Jun 6–9	Billy Hardwick (10)
Portland Open	Valley Lanes	Portland, Oregon	Jun 13–16	Jim Stefanich (8)
Fresno Open	Cedar Lanes	Fresno, California	Jun 20–23	Jim Stefanich (9)
Tucson Open	Cactus Bowl	Tucson, Arizona	Jun 27–30	Tim Harahan (2)
El Paso Open	Bowlero Lanes	El Paso, Texas	Jul 4–7	Mike Durbin (3)
Fort Worth Open	Meadowbrook Lanes	Fort Worth, Texas	Jul 11–14	Don McCune (1)
Houston-Sertoma Open	Stadium Bowl	Houston, Texas	Jul 18–21	Wayne Zahn (8)
Coast Guard Open	Starlite Lanes	Grand Haven, Michigan	Aug 8–11	Bill Allen (12)
Waukegan Open	Bertrand Bowl	Waukegan, Illinois	Aug 15–18	Bob Strampe (5)
Canadian Open	Laurentian Lanes	Montreal, Quebec	Aug 22–25	Skee Foremsky (3)
Rochester Open	Clover Lanes	Rochester, New York	Aug 30 – Sep 2	Tim Harahan (3)
Portsmouth-Norfolk Open	Miracle Lanes	Portsmouth, Virginia	Sep 5–8	Don Johnson (5)
Altoona Open	Holiday Bowl	Altoona, Pennsylvania	Sep 12–15	Jim Godman (3)
Newark Open	Valley Bowl Lanes	Newark, Ohio	Sep 19–22	Bill Allen (13)
Mercury Open	Edison Lanes	Edison, New Jersey	Sep 22–29	Wayne Zahn (9)
Japan Gold Cup	Starlanes	Tokyo, Japan	Oct 1–17	Don Johnson (6)
Green Bay Open	Western Lanes	Green Bay, Wisconsin	Oct 30 – Nov 2	Mike McGrath (2)
Joliet Open	Town & Country Lanes	Joliet, Illinois	Nov 7–10	Don Glover (2)
Durham Open	Village Bowl	Durham, North Carolina	Nov 14–17	Dave Davis (10)
Ninth Annual PBA National Championship	Madison Square Garden Center	New York, New York	Dec 1–6	Wayne Zahn (10)
