= 1970 PBA Tour season =

PBA Bowling Tour: 1970 Season
- League: Professional Bowlers Association
- Sport: Ten-pin bowling
- Duration: January 6 – December 14, 1970

PBA Tour
- Season MVP: Nelson Burton Jr.

PBA Tour seasons
- ← 1969 1971 →

This is a recap of the 1970 season for the Professional Bowlers Association (PBA) Tour. It was the tour's 12th season, and consisted of 35 events. Dave Soutar had the most titles on the 1970 Tour (5), but it was Nelson Burton Jr., winner of four titles and the George Young High Average award, who claimed the Sporting News PBA Player of the Year award.

Mike McGrath successfully defended his 1969 title at the PBA National Championship. Don Johnson nearly made history in winning the Firestone Tournament of Champions, firing a 299 game in the finale to upend Dick Ritger, 299–268.

Dick Weber won the season-ending Hawaiian Invitational to become the first player to reach 20 career PBA Tour titles. This season also saw the debut of PBA legend Earl Anthony, a 31-year old rookie. Anthony would win the first of his 43 titles on June 7 at the Heidelberg Open.

== Tournament schedule ==
Event	Bowling center	City	Dates	Winner
Wichita Centennial Open	Crestview Bowl	Wichita, Kansas	Jan 6–10	Skee Foremsky (5)
Greater Los Angeles Open	Bowling Square	Arcadia, California	Jan 13–17	Ed Bourdase (1)
Showboat Invitational	Showboat Lanes	Las Vegas, Nevada	Jan 20–24	Dave Soutar (6)
San Jose Open	Saratoga Lanes	San Jose, California	Jan 27–31	Dave Davis (12)
Denver Open	Colorado Bowl	Denver, Colorado	Feb 3–7	Nelson Burton Jr. (4)
Ebonite Open	King Louie West	Kansas City, Missouri	Feb 10–14	Jim Stefanich (10)
Miller High Life Open	Bowlero Lanes	Milwaukee, Wisconsin	Feb 17–21	George Pappas (1)
Buckeye Open	Imperial Lanes	Toledo, Ohio	Feb 24–28	Nelson Burton Jr. (5)
Greater Buffalo Open	Fairlanes	Buffalo, New York	Mar 3–7	George Pappas (2)
Don Carter Classic	Madison Square Garden Center	New York, New York	Mar 10–14	Mike Limongello (4)
Cougar Open	Coliseum Lanes	Coral Gables, Florida	Mar 17–21	Mike McGrath (4)
New Orleans Lions Open	Pelican Lanes	New Orleans, Louisiana	Mar 24–28	Don Johnson (10)
Firestone Tournament of Champions	Riviera Lanes	Akron, Ohio	Mar 31 – Apr 4	Don Johnson (11)
National Pro-Am Classic	East Point Triangle Lanes	Atlanta, Georgia	Apr 11–12	Wayne Zahn (12)
Heidelberg Open	Ballinger Bowl	Seattle, Washington	Jun 4–7	Earl Anthony (1)
Portland Open	Valley Lanes	Portland, Oregon	Jun 11–14	Don Glover (5)
Bellows-Valvair Open	Mel's Bowl	Redwood City, California	Jun 18–21	Mike Durbin (4)
Fresno Open	Cedar Lanes	Fresno, California	Jun 26–29	Marty Piraino (3)
Tucson Centurion Open	Cactus Bowl	Tucson, Arizona	Jul 2–5	Larry Laub (1)
El Paso Open	Freeway Lanes	El Paso, Texas	Jul 10–13	Nelson Burton Jr. (6)
Houston-Sertoma Open	Stadium Bowl	Houston, Texas	Jul 17–20	Don McCune (2)
Fort Worth Open	Meadowbrook Lanes	Fort Worth, Texas	Jul 23–26	Nelson Burton Jr. (7)
Grand Rapids Open	Westgate Bowl	Grand Rapids, Michigan	Aug 14–17	Dick Battista (1)
Waukegan Open	Bertrand Bowl	Waukegan, Illinois	Aug 20–23	Dave Soutar (7)
Gansett Open	Cranston Bowl	Cranston, Rhode Island	Aug 28–31	Jim Stefanich (11)
Bellows-Valvair Open	N. Versailles Lanes	Pittsburgh, Pennsylvania	Sep 4–7	Johnny Petraglia (2)
Blue Mountain Open	Blue Valley Lanes	Windgap, Pennsylvania	Sep 10–13	Curt Schmidt (1)
Japan Gold Cup	Starlanes	Tokyo, Japan	Sep 24 – Oct 12	Dick Ritger (9)
11th Annual PBA National Championship	Garden City Bowl	Garden City, New York	Oct 17–24	Mike McGrath (5)
Bellows-Valvair Open	Dick Weber Lanes	St. Louis, Missouri	Oct 30 – Nov 2	Dave Soutar (8)
Lincoln Open	Hollywood Bowl	Lincoln, Nebraska	Nov 6–9	Dave Soutar (9)
Mercury Open	Hilander Bowling Palace	Oklahoma City, Oklahoma	Nov 13–16	Bud Horn (2)
American Airlines Open	Hartfield Lanes	Detroit, Michigan	Nov 20–23	Dave Soutar (10)
Bellows-Valvair Open	Maiden Lanes	Rochester, New York	Nov 27–30	Teata Semiz (2)
Hawaiian Invitational	Honolulu Bowl	Honolulu, Hawaii	Dec 3–14	Dick Weber (20)
