= 1972 PBA Tour season =

PBA Bowling Tour: 1972 Season
- League: Professional Bowlers Association
- Sport: Ten-pin bowling
- Duration: January 2 – December 15, 1972

PBA Tour
- Season MVP: Don Johnson

PBA Tour seasons
- ← 1971 1973 →

This is a recap of the 1972 season for the Professional Bowlers Association (PBA) Tour. It was the tour's 14th season, and consisted of 32 events. With three victories, including a major at the BPAA U.S. Open, Don Johnson repeated as PBA Player of the Year, becoming just the second multiple winner of the award (after Billy Hardwick). With his third victory of the season at the Brunswick World Open, Johnson also joined Dick Weber as the PBA Tour's only 20-time winners to date.

Mike Durbin captured the season's second major at the Firestone Tournament of Champions, while Johnny Guenther was the victor at the PBA National Championship.

== Tournament schedule ==
Event	Bowling center	City	Dates	Winner
BPAA U.S. Open	Madison Square Garden	New York, New York	Jan 2–8	Don Johnson (18)
Denver Open	Colorado Bowl	Denver, Colorado	Jan 11–15	Don Johnson (19)
Showboat Invitational	Showboat Lanes	Las Vegas, Nevada	Jan 18–22	Gus Lampo (1)
Don Carter Classic	Bowling Square	Arcadia, California	Jan 25–29	Bill Beach (1)
Mercury Cougar Open	Saratoga Lanes	San Jose, California	Feb 1–5	Gus Lampo (2)
King Louie Open	King Louie West	Kansas City, Missouri	Feb 8–12	Larry Laub (3)
Winston-Salem Classic	Major League Lanes	Winston-Salem, North Carolina	Feb 15–19	Butch Gearhart (4)
Fair Lanes Open	Fair Lanes	Springfield, Virginia	Feb 22–26	Bobby Meadows (1)
Ebonite Open	Fair Lanes Coliseum	Miami, Florida	Feb 29 – Mar 2	Nelson Burton Jr. (8)
Buckeye Open	Imperial Lanes	Toledo, Ohio	Mar 7–11	Curt Schmidt (2)
Miller High Life Open	Red Carpet Lanes	Milwaukee, Wisconsin	Mar 14–18	Nelson Burton Jr. (9)
Andy Granatelli's STP Classic	Pelican Lanes	New Orleans, Louisiana	Mar 22–25	Don Helling (4)
Firestone Tournament of Champions	Riviera Lanes	Akron, Ohio	Mar 28 – Apr 1	Mike Durbin (5)
Seattle Open	Ballinger Bowl	Seattle, Washington	Jun 2–5	Gary Mage (1)
Portland Open	Valley Lanes	Portland, Oregon	Jun 8–11	Earl Anthony (3)
Japan Starlanes Open	Mel's Bowl	Redwood City, California	Jun 17–20	Earl Anthony (4)
Fresno Open	Cedar Lanes	Fresno, California	Jun 23–26	Allie Clarke (2)
Tucson Open	Cactus Bowl	Tucson, Arizona	Jul 1–4	Paul Colwell (1)
Winston-Salem Open	Brunswick Wonderbowl	Anaheim, California	Jul 7–10	Mike McGrath (6)
Houston-Sertoma Open	Stadium Bowl	Houston, Texas	Jul 14–17	Paul Colwell (2)
Columbia 300 Open	Cranston Bowl	Cranston, Rhode Island	Aug 4–7	Barry Asher (5)
Bay City Open	Eastland Lanes	Bay City, Michigan	Aug 11–14	Dick Ritger (10)
Waukegan Open	Bertrand Lanes	Waukegan, Illinois	Aug 17–20	Nelson Burton Jr. (10)
Grand Rapids Open	Westgate Bowl	Grand Rapids, Michigan	Aug 25–28	Jim Godman (7)
South Bend Open	Chippewa Lanes	South Bend, Indiana	Sep 1–4	Matt Surina (1)
Bellows-Valvair Open	Painesville Lanes	Painesville, Ohio	Sep 8–11	Johnny Petraglia (8)
Japan Gold Cup	Starlanes	Tokyo, Japan	Sep 23 – Oct 8	Barry Asher (6)
Bellows-Valvair Open	Hartfield Lanes	Detroit, Michigan	Nov 3–6	Roy Buckley (2)
American Airlines Open	Western Bowl	St. Louis, Missouri	Nov 10–13	Earl Anthony (5)
Brunswick World Open	Brunswick Northern Bowl	Glendale Heights, Illinois	Nov 19–25	Don Johnson (20)
13th Annual PBA National Championship	Henrietta Lanes	Rochester, New York	Nov 26 – Dec 1	Johnny Guenther (7)
Winston-Salem Invitational	Honolulu Bowl	Honolulu, Hawaii	Dec 5–15	Mike McGrath (7)
