= 1967 PBA Tour season =

PBA Bowling Tour: 1967 Season
- League: Professional Bowlers Association
- Sport: Ten-pin bowling
- Duration: January 3 – December 9, 1967

PBA Tour
- Season MVP: Dave Davis

PBA Tour seasons
- ← 1966 1968 →

This is a recap of the 1967 season for the Professional Bowlers Association (PBA) Tour. It was the tour's ninth season, and consisted of 33 events. Dave Davis was the runaway winner of the Sporting News PBA Player of the Year award, as he won six titles during the season and became the first multiple winner of the PBA National Championship (he also won the event in 1965). Jim Stefanich captured his first major title at the Firestone Tournament of Champions. The ToC included the first-ever nationally televised 300 game, rolled by Jack Biondolillo in the opening match of the live finals.

== Tournament schedule ==
Event	Bowling center	City	Dates	Winner
Tucson Open	Cactus Bowl	Tucson, Arizona	Jan 3–7	John Juni (1)
Western Open	Saratoga Lanes	San Jose, California	Jan 10–14	Jim St. John (5)
Las Vegas Open	Showboat Lanes	Las Vegas, Nevada	Jan 17–21	Dave Davis (3)
Denver Open	Broadway Bowl	Denver, Colorado	Jan 24–28	Dave Davis (4)
St. Paul Open	All-Star Bowl	St. Paul, Minnesota	Jan 31 – Feb 4	Carmen Salvino (8)
Brut Open	King Louie West	Kansas City, Missouri	Feb 7–11	Tim Harahan (1)
Buckeye Open	Imperial Lanes	Toledo, Ohio	Feb 14–18	Jim St. John (6)
Miller High Life Open	Bowlero Lanes	Milwaukee, Wisconsin	Feb 21–25	Dave Davis (5)
Ebonite Open	Edison Lanes	Edison, New Jersey	Feb 28 – Mar 4	Sam Baca (2)
Greater Buffalo Open	Fairlanes	Depew, New York	Mar 7–11	Nelson Burton Jr. (2)
Tampa Bay-Sertoma Open	East Gate Lanes	Tampa, Florida	Mar 14–18	Mike Durbin (1)
Mobile-Sertoma Open	Florida Bowl	Mobile, Alabama	Mar 21–25	Carmen Salvino (9)
Firestone Tournament of Champions	Riviera Lanes	Akron, Ohio	Mar 28 – Apr 1	Jim Stefanich (2)
Seattle Open	Ballinger Bowl	Seattle, Washington	Jun 7–10	Don Johnson (3)
Portland Open	Valley Lanes	Portland, Oregon	Jun 15–18	Les Schissler (5)
Fresno Open	Cedar Lanes	Fresno, California	Jun 22–25	Dick Ritger (3)
El Paso Optimists Club Open	Freeway Lanes	El Paso, Texas	Jun 29 – Jul 2	Bill Tucker (2)
Houston-Sertoma Open	Post Oak Lanes	Houston, Texas	Jul 6–9	Butch Gearhart (1)
Fort Worth Open	Meadowbrook Lanes	Fort Worth, Texas	Jul 13–16	Dave Soutar (3)
Fort Smith Open	Midland Bowl	Fort Smith, Arkansas	Jul 27–30	Jim Stefanich (3)
Brockton Open	Westgate Lanes	Brockton, Massachusetts	Aug 3–6	Don Johnson (4)
U.S. Coast Guard Festival	Starlite Lanes	Grand Haven, Michigan	Aug 10–13	Jim Stefanich (4)
Waukegan Open	Bertrand Bowl	Waukegan, Illinois	Aug 17–20	Jim Godman (2)
Green Bay Open	Western Lanes	Green Bay, Wisconsin	Aug 24–27	Dave Davis (6)
Nebraska Centennial Open	Rose Bowl Lanes	Omaha, Nebraska	Sep 1–4	Dave Davis (7)
Lubbock Open	Oakwood Lanes	Lubbock, Texas	Sep 7–10	Skee Foremsky (2)
Lions Club Open	Pelican Lanes	New Orleans, Louisiana	Sep 14–17	Bill Tucker (3)
Kokomo Open	Cedar Crest Lanes	Kokomo, Indiana	Oct 26–29	Billy Hardwick (9)
Youngstown Open	Holiday Bowl	Youngstown, Ohio	Nov 2–5	Mike Durbin (2)
Plainville Open	Stadium Lanes	Plainville, Connecticut	Nov 9–12	Don Helling (1)
Durham Open	Village Bowl	Durham, North Carolina	Nov 16–19	Wayne Zahn (7)
Camden Open	Camden Lanes	Camden, New Jersey	Nov 22–25	George Howard (5)
Eighth Annual PBA National Championship	Madison Square Garden Center	New York, New York	Dec 3–9	Dave Davis (8)
