= 1973 PBA Tour season =

PBA Bowling Tour: 1973 Season
- League: Professional Bowlers Association
- Sport: Ten-pin bowling
- Duration: January 2 – December 14, 1973

PBA Tour
- Season MVP: Don McCune

PBA Tour seasons
- ← 1972 1974 →

This is a recap of the 1973 season for the Professional Bowlers Association (PBA) Tour. It was the tour's 15th season, and consisted of 33 events. Don McCune amassed six victories during the year, winning PBA Player of the Year honors along the way. McCune became known on tour this season for chemically softening his bowling balls to give them extra hooking power. The practice, which was completely legal at the time, was soon followed by several other bowlers in what would later be dubbed "The Year of the Soaker". This eventually led to new ABC and PBA rules related to altering bowling ball surfaces, while prompting bowling ball manufacturers to develop new, softer cover stocks.

Mike McGrath continued to come up big in big tournaments. His win in the BPAA U.S. Open gave him three majors among his first eight titles. McGrath would pick up his ninth and tenth titles later in the season.

Jim Godman became the first two-time winner in the Firestone Tournament of Champions, as he had also won the event in 1969. Earl Anthony captured his seventh PBA title and first major at the PBA National Championship.

== Tournament schedule ==
Event	Bowling center	City	Dates	Winner
San Jose Open	Saratoga Lanes	San Jose, California	Jan 2–6	Allie Clarke (3)
Don Carter Classic	Bowling Square	Arcadia, California	Jan 9–13	Gary Dickinson (1)
Showboat Invitational	Showboat Lanes	Las Vegas, Nevada	Jan 17–20	Barry Asher (7)
Denver Open	Colorado Bowl	Denver, Colorado	Jan 23–27	Jay Robinson (1)
King Louie Open	King Louie West Lanes	Overland Park, Kansas	Jan 31 – Feb 3	Bobby Knipple (1)
Lincoln-Mercury Open	Pelican Lanes	New Orleans, Louisiana	Feb 6–10	Carmen Salvino (10)
Fair Lanes Open	Fair Lanes	Towson, Maryland	Feb 13–17	Dick Ritger (11)
Winston-Salem Classic	Major League Lanes	Winston-Salem, North Carolina	Feb 20–24	Don McCune (3)
Miller High Life Open	Red Carpet Lanes	Milwaukee, Wisconsin	Feb 27 – Mar 3	Don McCune (4)
BPAA U.S. Open	Madison Square Garden	New York, New York	Mar 4–10	Mike McGrath (8)
Ebonite Open	Buckeye Lanes	Toledo, Ohio	Mar 13–17	Dick Weber (24)
STP Classic	Bird Bowl	Miami, Florida	Mar 20–24	Dick Ritger (12)
Firestone Tournament of Champions	Riviera Lanes	Akron, Ohio	Mar 27–31	Jim Godman (8)
Winston-Salem Open	Brunswick Wonderbowl	Downey, California	Jun 1–5	Don McCune (5)
Home Box Office Open	Valley Lanes	Portland, Oregon	Jun 9–13	Dave Soutar (13)
Seattle Open	Ballinger Bowl	Seattle, Washington	Jun 15–18	Earl Anthony (6)
Fresno Open	Cedar Lanes	Fresno, California	Jun 22–25	Don McCune (6)
Redwood City Open	Mel's Bowl	Redwood City, California	Jun 29 – Jul 2	Don McCune (7)
Home Box Office Open	Cactus Bowl	Tucson, Arizona	Jul 6–10	Barry Asher (8)
Houston-Sertoma Open	Stadium Bowl	Houston, Texas	Jul 12–15	Don Johnson (21)
Fort Worth Open	Meadowbrook Lanes	Fort Worth, Texas	Jul 19–23	Gary Dickinson (2)
Home Box Office Open	Penn Bowl	Pennsville, New Jersey	Jul 27–31	Mike McGrath (9)
Starlanes-Ebonite Open	Cranston Bowl	Cranston, Rhode Island	Aug 3–7	Paul Colwell (3)
Bay City Open	Eastland Lanes	Bay City, Michigan	Aug 10–13	Don Johnson (22)
Columbia 300 Open	Bertrand Lanes	Waukegan, Illinois	Aug 16–20	Marty Piraino (4)
PBA National Championship	Hilander Bowling Palace	Oklahoma City, Oklahoma	Aug 26 – Sep 1	Earl Anthony (7)
Japan Gold Cup	Japan Starlanes Centers	Japan	Sep 10–23	Don McCune (8)
Brunswick Eastern Open	Bayside Lanes	Bayside, New York	Oct 19–23	Matt Surina (2)
Painesville Open	Painesville Lanes	Painesville, Ohio	Oct 26–29	Paul Colwell (4)
Canada Dry Open	Hartfield Lanes	Detroit, Michigan	Nov 2–6	Dick Ritger (13)
Brut Open	Skylark Bowl	St. Louis, Missouri	Nov 9–13	Butch Gearhart (5)
Brunswick World Open	Brunswick Northern Bowl	Glendale Heights, Illinois	Nov 18–24	Jim Godman (9)
Winston-Salem Invitational	(Multiple Centers)	Honolulu, Hawaii	Dec 4–14	Mike McGrath (10)
