= 1975 PBA Tour season =

PBA Bowling Tour: 1975 Season
- League: Professional Bowlers Association
- Sport: Ten-pin bowling
- Duration: December 30, 1974 – December 11, 1975

PBA Tour
- Season MVP: Earl Anthony

PBA Tour seasons
- ← 1974 1976 →

This is a recap of the 1975 season for the Professional Bowlers Association (PBA) Tour. It was the tour's 17th season, and consisted of 34 events. Earl Anthony became the first PBA player to win seven titles in a season since Dick Weber (1961), while also gaining an unprecedented "three-peat" in the Brunswick PBA National Championship. As he did in 1974, Anthony easily won the player vote for the PBA Player of the Year award. In another historic "first," Anthony earned $107,585 in 1975 to become the first bowler to collect over $100,000 in a single season.

Steve Neff made his second PBA Tour win count, capturing the BPAA U.S. Open, while Dave Davis collected his second career Firestone Tournament of Champions trophy.

Don Johnson won his 24th career PBA Tour title in the Tucson Open, which at the time tied him with Dick Weber for the most Tour wins. (Weber, however, had also won four BPAA All-Star events earlier in his career. These were not counted as PBA titles at the time, but were added as titles in 2008 when the PBA amended its rules.)

== Tournament schedule ==
Event	Bowling center	City	Dates	Winner
ARC Alameda Open	Mel's Bowl	Alameda, California	Dec 30 – Jan 4	Barry Asher (9)
Greater L.A. Open	Bowling Square	Arcadia, California	Jan 7–11	Earl Anthony (14)
Showboat Invitational	Showboat Hotel Lanes	Las Vegas, Nevada	Jan 14–18	Carmen Salvino (12)
Denver Open	Colorado Bowl	Denver, Colorado	Jan 21–25	Larry Laub (7)
King Louie Open	King Louie West Lanes	Overland Park, Kansas	Jan 28 – Feb 1	Mark Roth (1)
Copenhagen Open	Buckeye Lanes	North Olmsted, Ohio	Feb 4–8	Paul Colwell (6)
Fair Lanes Open	Fair Lanes	Springfield, Virginia	Feb 11–16	Gary Dickinson (4)
Long Island Open	Garden City Bowl	Garden City, New York	Feb 18–22	Earl Anthony (15)
Midas Open	Bradley Bowl	Windsor Locks, Connecticut	Feb 25 – Mar 1	Nelson Burton Jr. (12)
Ebonite Don Carter Classic	Bird Bowl	Miami, Florida	Mar 4–8	Dick Ritger (17)
Lincoln-Mercury Open	Dick Weber Lanes	Florissant, Missouri	Mar 11–15	Ed Ressler (2)
Monroe Max-Air Open	Pelican Lanes	New Orleans, Louisiana	Mar 18–22	Don Helling (5)
BPAA U.S. Open	Forum Bowl	Grand Prairie, Texas	Mar 23–29	Steve Neff (2)
Miller High Life Open	Red Carpet Bowlero	Milwaukee, Wisconsin	Apr 1–5	Dave Davis (13)
Ebonite Open	Imperial Lanes	Toledo, Ohio	Apr 8–12	Louie Moore (1)
Firestone Tournament of Champions	Riviera Lanes	Akron, Ohio	Apr 15–19	Dave Davis (14)
Brunswick PBA National Championship	Brunswick Wonderbowl	Downey, California	May 24–31	Earl Anthony (16)
Sacramento Open	Country Club Lanes	Sacramento, California	Jun 7–10	Sam Flanagan (1)
Portland Open	Valley Lanes	Beaverton, Oregon	Jun 14–18	Sal Bongiorno (1)
Seattle Open	Leilani Lanes	Seattle, Washington	Jun 21–24	Johnny Guenther (10)
San Jose Open	Saratoga Lanes	San Jose, California	Jun 28 – Jul 2	Palmer Fallgren (1)
Fresno Open	Cedar Lanes	Fresno, California	Jul 3–8	Marshall Holman (1)
Tucson Open	Golden Pin Lanes	Tucson, Arizona	Jul 11–15	Don Johnson (24)
Quad Cities Open	Suburban Lanes	Davenport, Iowa	Jul 25–28	Earl Anthony (17)
Home Box Office Open	N. Versaiilles Bowl	Pittsburgh, Pennsylvania	Aug 1–5	Carmen Salvino (13)
Jackson Open	Jackson Lanes	Jackson, New Jersey	Aug 8–11	Earl Anthony (18)
Home Box Office Open	Thruway Lanes	Buffalo, New York	Aug 15–19	Tommy Hudson (2)
Waukegan Open	Bertrand Lanes	Waukegan, Illinois	Aug 21–25	Earl Anthony (19)
Columbia 300 Open	Hartfield Lanes	Detroit, Michigan	Aug 28 – Sep 1	Dale Glenn (1)
Buzz Fazio Open	Nottke's Bowl	Battle Creek, Michigan	Oct 24–27	Earl Anthony (20)
Canada Dry Open	Westgate Lanes	Cleveland, Ohio	Oct 31 – Nov 3	Roy Buckley (3)
Syracuse Open	Strike 'n Spare Lanes	Syracuse, New York	Nov 7–10	John Wilcox (1)
Brunswick World Open	Brunswick Northern Bowl	Glendale Heights, Illinois	Nov 16–22	Dave Davis (15)
Hawaiian Invitational	(Multiple Centers)	Honolulu, Hawaii	Dec 3–11	Marshall Holman (2)
