= 1976 PBA Tour season =

PBA Bowling Tour: 1976 Season
- League: Professional Bowlers Association
- Sport: Ten-pin bowling
- Duration: December 31, 1975 – December 16, 1976

PBA Tour
- Season MVP: Earl Anthony

PBA Tour seasons
- ← 1975 1977 →

This is a recap of the 1976 season for the Professional Bowlers Association (PBA) Tour. It was the tour's 18th season, and consisted of 35 events. Earl Anthony added another "first" to his résumé, becoming the first player to win three PBA Player of the Year awards. Anthony again dominated the tour with six victories and topped the $100,000 season earnings mark for the second straight year (topping his previous record by cashing $110,808).

Anthony, however, did not win a major title in 1976. Those titles went to Paul Moser (BPAA U.S. Open), Marshall Holman (Firestone Tournament of Champions) and Paul Colwell (Brunswick PBA National Championship). Holman (21) became the youngest Tournament of Champions winner ever with his victory, a distinction he would hold until 2016 when Swede Jesper Svensson won the ToC at age 20.

The lead for career PBA titles changed hands a few times during the season. Dick Weber collected his 25th career title in February to hold the lead until July, when Don Johnson also won his 25th. By the end of the season, Earl Anthony had reached 26 titles to pass both. (Weber, however, had also won four BPAA All-Star events earlier in his career. These were not counted as PBA titles at the time, but were added as titles in 2008 when the PBA amended its rules.)

== Tournament schedule ==
Event	Bowling center	City	Dates	Winner
Ford Open	Bowling Square	Arcadia, California	Dec 31 – Jan 3	Johnny Guenther (11)
ARC Alameda Open	Mel's Southshore Bowl	Alameda, California	Jan 6–10	Roy Buckley (4)
Showboat Invitational	Showboat Hotel Lanes	Las Vegas, Nevada	Jan 11–17	Wayne Zahn (14)
Denver Open	Colorado Bowl	Denver, Colorado	Jan 20–24	Jim Stefanich (13)
King Louie Open	King Louie West Lanes	Overland Park, Kansas	Jan 27–31	George Pappas (4)
Cleveland Open	Buckeye Lanes	North Olmsted, Ohio	Feb 3–7	Tommy Hudson (3)
Fair Lanes Open	Fair Lanes	Towson, Maryland	Feb 10–14	Curt Schmidt (3)
AMF Pro Classic	Garden City Bowl	Garden City, New York	Feb 17–21	Dick Weber (25)
Midas Open	Bradley Bowl	Windsor Locks, Connecticut	Feb 24–28	Earl Anthony (21)
AMF Dick Weber Five-Star Open	Don Carter's Tamarac Lanes	Tamarac, Florida	Mar 2–6	Earl Anthony (22)
New Orleans Lions Open	Pelican Lanes	Metarie, Louisiana	Mar 9–13	Louie Moore (2)
BPAA U.S. Open	Forum Bowl	Grand Prairie, Texas	Mar 14–20	Paul Moser (1)
Rolaids Open	Dick Weber Lanes	Florissant, Missouri	Mar 23–27	Mark Roth (2)
Miller High Life Open	Red Carpet Celebrity Lanes	Milwaukee, Wisconsin	Mar 30 – Apr 3	Dave Soutar (15)
Monro-Matic Open	Imperial Lanes	Toledo, Ohio	Apr 6–10	Billy Hardwick (17)
Firestone Tournament of Champions	Riviera Lanes	Akron, Ohio	Apr 13–17	Marshall Holman (3)
Fresno HBO Open	Cedar Lanes	Fresno, California	Jun 6–10	Earl Anthony (23)
Brunswick PBA National Championship	Leilani Lanes	Seattle, Washington	Jun 13–20	Paul Colwell (7)
Portland HBO Open	Valley Lanes	Beaverton, Oregon	Jun 26–30	Larry Laub (8)
PBA Doubles Classic	Saratoga Lanes	San Jose, California	Jul 7–11	Paul Colwell (8), Don Johnson (25)
Tucson HBO Open	Golden Pin Lanes	Tucson, Arizona	Jul 16–20	Barry Asher (10)
Showboat Best-Ball Doubles	Showboat Hotel Lanes	Las Vegas, Nevada	Jul 21–25	Bill Straub (1), Tom Warren (1)
Quad Cities Open	Suburban Lanes	Davenport, Iowa	Jul 30 – Aug 3	Carmen Salvino (14)
Buffalo Open	Thruway Lanes	Cheektowaga, New York	Aug 6–10	Dave Frame (1)
New England Open	Lang's Bowlarama	Cranston, Rhode Island	Aug 13–17	Jim Frazier (1)
Great Adventure Open	Curtis Suburban Lanes	Trenton, New Jersey	Aug 20–24	Jay Robinson (2)
Waukegan Open	Bertrand Lanes	Waukegan, Illinois	Aug 26–30	Earl Anthony (24)
Columbia 300 Open	N. Versailles Bowl	Pittsburgh, Pennsylvania	Sep 3–7	Mark Roth (3)
AMF Regional Champions Classic	North Hill Bowl	Minot, North Dakota	Oct 12–16	Mike Berlin (1)
Buzz Fazio Open	Ken Nottke's Bowl	Battle Creek, Michigan	Oct 22–25	Earl Anthony (25)
Northern Ohio Open	Westgate Lanes	Fairview Park, Ohio	Oct 29 – Nov 1	Mark Roth (4)
Syracuse Open	Strike 'n Spare Lanes	Syracuse, New York	Nov 5–8	Louie Moore (3)
Brunswick World Open	Brunswick Northern Bowl	Glendale Heights, Illinois	Nov 14–20	Gary Dickinson (5)
AMF Grand Prix of Bowling	Thunderbowl	Allen Park, Michigan	Nov 30 – Dec 4	Earl Anthony (26)
Hawaiian Invitational	(Multiple Centers)	Honolulu, Hawaii	Dec 6–16	Larry Laub (9)
