= 1974 PBA Tour season =

PBA Bowling Tour: 1974 Season
- League: Professional Bowlers Association
- Sport: Ten-pin bowling
- Duration: January 1 – December 12, 1974

PBA Tour
- Season MVP: Earl Anthony

PBA Tour seasons
- ← 1973 1975 →

This is a recap of the 1974 season for the Professional Bowlers Association (PBA) Tour. It was the tour's 16th season, and consisted of 31 events. Earl Anthony won back-to-back majors (in the Firestone Tournament of Champions and Brunswick PBA National Championship) among his six victories during the year, easily winning PBA Player of the Year honors. Anthony also joined Mike McGrath as the only PBA players to successfully defend a PBA National Championship.

The other major title of the season, the BPAA U.S. Open, was won by Larry Laub for his first major and sixth title overall.

In the 1974 season opener in Alameda, CA, a live national TV audience witnessed the PBA Tour's third televised 300 game, rolled by Jim Stefanich in a semi-final match. Earl Anthony nearly duplicated the feat when he fired a 299 game in the final match of the season-ending Winston-Salem Hawaiian Invitational.

== Tournament schedule ==
Event	Bowling center	City	Dates	Winner
Midas Open	Mel's Bowl	Alameda, California	Jan 1–5	Dick Ritger (14)
Don Carter Classic	Bowling Square	Arcadia, California	Jan 8–12	Larry Laub (4)
Showboat Invitational	Showboat Lanes	Las Vegas, Nevada	Jan 16–19	Jim Stefanich (12)
King Louie Open	King Louie West Lanes	Overland Park, Kansas	Jan 22–26	George Pappas (3)
Cleveland Open	Buckeye Lanes	North Olmsted, Ohio	Jan 29 – Feb 2	Larry Laub (5)
Fair Lanes Open	Fair Lanes	Towson, Maryland	Feb 5–9	Dick Ritger (15)
BPAA U.S. Open	Madison Square Garden	New York, New York	Feb 10–16	Larry Laub (6)
Winston-Salem Classic	Major League Lanes	Winston-Salem, North Carolina	Feb 19–23	Ed Ressler (1)
STP Classic	Bird Bowl	Miami, Florida	Feb 28 – Mar 2	Alex Seymore (1)
New Orleans Open	Pelican Lanes	New Orleans, Louisiana	Mar 5–9	Paul Colwell (5)
Lincoln-Mercury Open	Colorado Bowl	Denver, Colorado	Mar 12–16	Johnny Guenther (8)
Miller High Life Open	Red Carpet-Bowlero	Milwaukee, Wisconsin	Mar 19–23	Johnny Guenther (9)
Ebonite Open	Imperial Lanes	Toledo, Ohio	Mar 26–30	Wayne Zahn (13)
Firestone Tournament of Champions	Riviera Lanes	Akron, Ohio	Apr 2–6	Earl Anthony (8)
Brunswick PBA National Championship	Brunswick Wonderbowl	Downey, California	Jun 2–9	Earl Anthony (9)
Seattle Open	Ballinger Bowl	Seattle, Washington	Jun 14–18	Ed Bourdase (3)
Winston-Salem Open	Valley Lanes	Portland, Oregon	Jun 22–26	Gary Dickinson (3)
Home Box Office Open	Saratoga Lanes	San Jose, California	Jun 28 – Jul 2	Earl Anthony (10)
Fresno Open	Cedar Lanes	Fresno, California	Jul 5–8	Earl Anthony (11)
Home Box Office Open	Cactus Bowl	Tucson, Arizona	Jul 12–16	Bob Hood (1)
Houston-Sertoma Open	Stadium Bowl	Houston, Texas	Jul 19–23	Tommy Hudson (1)
Home Box Office Open	Bradley Bowl	Windsor Locks, Connecticut	Aug 2–6	Nelson Burton Jr. (11)
New Jersey Open	Edison Bowl	Edison, New Jersey	Aug 9–13	Carmen Salvino (11)
Home Box Office Open	Thruway Lanes	Buffalo, New York	Aug 16–20	Dave Soutar (14)
Starlanes-Ebonite Open	Bertrand Lanes	Waukegan, Illinois	Aug 22–26	Dick Ritger (16)
Canada Dry Open	Hartfield Lanes	Detroit, Michigan	Aug 29 – Sep 2	Steve Neff (1)
Buzz Fazio Open	Nottke Bowl	Battle Creek, Michigan	Oct 18–21	Don Johnson (23)
Canada Dry Open	Westgate Lanes	Cleveland, Ohio	Oct 25–28	Earl Anthony (12)
Columbia 300 Open	Strike 'n Spare Lanes	Syracuse, New York	Nov 1–4	Skee Foremsky (6)
Brunswick World Open	Brunswick Northern Bowl	Glendale Heights, Illinois	Nov 10–16	Johnny Petraglia (9)
Winston-Salem Hawaiian Invitational	(Multiple Centers)	Honolulu, Hawaii	Dec 2–12	Earl Anthony (13)
