= 1969 PBA Tour season =

PBA Bowling Tour: 1969 Season
- League: Professional Bowlers Association
- Sport: Ten-pin bowling
- Duration: January 7 – December 18, 1969

PBA Tour
- Season MVP: Billy Hardwick

PBA Tour seasons
- ← 1968 1970 →

This is a recap of the 1969 season for the Professional Bowlers Association (PBA) Tour. It was the tour's 11th season, and consisted of 35 events. Billy Hardwick won six titles on the 1969 Tour (also adding a seventh in the BPAA All-Star, which was not part of the Tour at the time), and won the Sporting News PBA Player of the Year award. Mike McGrath won the PBA National Championship, while Jim Godman took the title in the Firestone Tournament of Champions.

Johnny Guenther rolled the PBA's second-ever televised 300 game in a semi-final match at the San Jose Open on February 1, 1969, before going on to win the tournament.

== Tournament schedule ==
Event	Bowling center	City	Dates	Winner
West Valley Open	West Valley Lanes	Canoga Park, California	Jan 7–11	Wayne Zahn (11)
Valley of the Sun Open	Tempe Bowl	Tempe, Arizona	Jan 14–18	Don Glover (3)
Showboat Invitational	Showboat Lanes	Las Vegas, Nevada	Jan 21–25	Skee Foremsky (4)
San Jose Open	Saratoga Lanes	San Jose, California	Jan 28 – Feb 1	Johnny Guenther (4)
Denver Open	Broadway Bowl	Denver, Colorado	Feb 4–8	Billy Hardwick (11)
Ebonite Open	King Louie West	Kansas City, Missouri	Feb 11–15	Don Glover (4)
Cougar Open	Paramus Bowl	Paramus, New Jersey	Feb 18–22	Ralph Engan (2)
Greater Buffalo Open	Fairlanes	Buffalo, New York	Feb 25 – Mar 1	Dick Ritger (6)
Miller High Life Open	Bowlero Lanes	Milwaukee, Wisconsin	Mar 4–8	Billy Hardwick (12)
Buckeye Open	Imperial Lanes	Toledo, Ohio	Mar 11–15	Ray Bluth (2)
Portsmouth Open	Portsmouth Bowl	Portsmouth, Virginia	Mar 18–22	Tommy Tuttle (2)
New Orleans Lions Open	Pelican Lanes	New Orleans, Louisiana	Mar 25–29	Dick Weber (18)
Firestone Tournament of Champions	Riviera Lanes	Akron, Ohio	Apr 1–5	Jim Godman (4)
National Pro-Am Bowling Classic	Florida Bowl	Mobile, Alabama	Apr 12–13	Don Helling (2)
Smallcomb Enterprises Classic	Redwood City Bowl	Redwood City, California	Jun 3–8	Billy Hardwick (13)
Seattle Open	Ballinger Bowl	Seattle, Washington	Jun 12–15	Don Johnson (7)
Portland Open	Valley Lanes	Portland, Oregon	Jun 19–22	Allie Clarke (1)
Tucson Open	Cactus Bowl	Tucson, Arizona	Jul 3–6	Terry Booth (1)
Fort Worth Open	Meadowbrook Lanes	Fort Worth, Texas	Jul 10–13	Billy Hardwick (14)
Houston-Sertoma Open	Stadium Bowl	Houston, Texas	Jul 17–20	Marty Piraino (2)
Huntsville Open	Pin Palace Lanes	Hunstville, Alabama	Jul 24–27	Joe Dignam (1)
Five-Star Open	Cranston Bowl	Cranston, Rhode Island	Aug 7–10	Nelson Burton Jr. (3)
Grand Rapids Open	Westgate Bowl	Grand Rapids, Michigan	Aug 14–17	Billy Hardwick (15)
Waukegan Open	Bertrand Bowl	Waukegan, Illinois	Aug 21–24	Les Zikes (1)
Canadian Open	Laurentian Lanes	Montreal, Quebec	Aug 28 – Sep 1	Dave Davis (11)
Altoona Jaycee Open	Holiday Bowl	Altoona, Pennsylvania	Sep 4–7	Dick Weber (19)
Newark Kiwanis Open	Valley Bowl Lanes	Newark, Ohio	Sep 11–14	Butch Gearhart (3)
Japan Gold Cup	Starlanes	Tokyo, Japan	Sep 20 – Oct 5	Dick Ritger (7)
Mercury Open	Dick Weber Lanes	St. Louis, Missouri	Oct 22–25	Jim Godman (5)
American Airlines Open	Hartfield Lanes	Detroit, Michigan	Oct 30 – Nov 2	Dave Soutar (5)
Joliet Open	Town & Country Lanes	Joliet, Illinois	Nov 6–9	Billy Hardwick (16)
Lincoln Open	Hollywood Bowl	Lincoln, Nebraska	Nov 13–16	Don Johnson (8)
Bellows-Valvair Open	Clover Lanes	Rochester, New York	Nov 20–23	Dick Ritger (8)
Tenth Annual PBA National Championship	Garden City Bowl	Garden City, New York	Nov 30 – Dec 6	Mike McGrath (3)
Hawaiian Invitational	Honolulu Bowl	Honolulu, Hawaii	Dec 10–18	Don Johnson (9)
