= 1971 PBA Tour season =

PBA Bowling Tour: 1971 Season
- League: Professional Bowlers Association
- Sport: Ten-pin bowling
- Duration: January 3 – December 13, 1971

PBA Tour
- Season MVP: Don Johnson

PBA Tour seasons
- ← 1970 1972 →

This is a recap of the 1971 season for the Professional Bowlers Association (PBA) Tour. It was the tour's 13th season, and consisted of 32 events. This marked the first season that the BPAA U.S. Open (formerly BPAA All-Star) was recognized as part of the PBA Tour. The event was won by Mike Limongello. Limongello posted a second major tournament win in 1971 when he captured the PBA National Championship.

Don Johnson had six titles on the 1971 Tour and won the PBA Player of the Year award, which was awarded by a player vote for the first time. Johnny Petraglia nearly matched Johnson with five titles, including a run of three in a row that concluded with a victory in the Firestone Tournament of Champions.

== Tournament schedule ==
Event	Bowling center	City	Dates	Winner
BPAA U.S. Open	Drkula's 32 Bowl	St. Paul, Minnesota	Jan 3–9	Mike Limongello (5)
Denver Open	Colorado Bowl	Denver, Colorado	Jan 12–18	Dick Weber (21)
Showboat Invitational	Showboat Lanes	Las Vegas, Nevada	Jan 19–23	Don Johnson (12)
Greater Los Angeles Open	Bowling Square	Arcadia, California	Jan 26–30	Dave Soutar (11)
Ebonite Open	Saratoga Lanes	San Jose, California	Feb 2–6	Larry Lichstein (1)
Andy Granatelli's STP Classic	King Louie West	Kansas City, Missouri	Feb 9–13	Johnny Guenther (5)
Winston-Salem Classic	Major League Lanes	Winston-Salem, North Carolina	Feb 16–20	Johnny Petraglia (3)
Miller High Life Open	Red Carpet Lanes	Milwaukee, Wisconsin	Feb 23–27	Dave Soutar (12)
Buckeye Open	Imperial Lanes	Toledo, Ohio	Mar 2–6	Dick Weber (22)
Cougar Open	Madison Square Garden	New York, New York	Mar 9–13	Earl Anthony (2)
Fair Lanes Open	Fair Lanes	Springfield, Virginia	Mar 18–20	Johnny Petraglia (4)
Don Carter Classic	Pelican Lanes	New Orleans, Louisiana	Mar 23–27	Johnny Petraglia (5)
Firestone Tournament of Champions	Riviera Lanes	Akron, Ohio	Mar 27 – Apr 1	Johnny Petraglia (6)
Bellows-Valvair Open	Brunswick Wonderbowl	Anaheim, California	Jun 4–7	Gary Madison (1)
Fresno Open	Cedar Lanes	Fresno, California	Jun 11–14	Ed Bourdase (2)
Seattle Open	Ballinger Bowl	Seattle, Washington	Jun 18–21	Don Johnson (13)
Portland Open	Valley Lanes	Portland, Oregon	Jun 24–27	Don Helling (3)
Winston-Salem Open	Mel's Bowl	Redwood City, California	Jul 2–5	Don Johnson (14)
Tucson Open	Cactus Bowl	Tucson, Arizona	Jul 5–12	Jim Godman (6)
El Paso Open	Freeway Lanes	El Paso, Texas	Jul 16–19	J. B. Blaylock (1)
Houston-Sertoma Open	Stadium Bowl	Houston, Texas	Jul 23–26	Johnny Petraglia (7)
Grand Rapids Open	Westgate Bowl	Grand Rapids, Michigan	Aug 13–16	Tommy Tuttle (3)
Waukegan Open	Bertrand Lanes	Waukegan, Illinois	Aug 19–22	Don Johnson (15)
South Bend Open	Chippewa Bowl	South Bend, Indiana	Aug 27–30	Barry Asher (3)
Winston-Salem Open	Cranston Bowl	Cranston, Rhode Island	Sep 3–6	Roy Buckley (1)
12th Annual PBA National Championship	Paramus Bowl	Paramus, New Jersey	Oct 9–16	Mike Limongello (6)
Lincoln Open	Hollywood Bowl	Lincoln, Nebraska	Oct 22–25	Larry Laub (2)
850,000 American Airlines Open	Ellisville Bowl	Ellisville, Missouri	Oct 29 – Nov 1	Barry Asher (4)
Mercury Open	Henrietta Lanes	Rochester, New York	Nov 5–8	Johnny Guenther (6)
Bellows-Valvair Open	Hartfield Lanes	Detroit, Michigan	Nov 12–15	Don Johnson (16)
Brunswick World Open	Northern Bowl	Glendale Heights, Illinois	Nov 21–27	Don Johnson (17)
Hawaiian Invitational	Honolulu Bowl	Honolulu, Hawaii	Dec 3–13	Dick Weber (23)
