= 1966 PBA Tour season =

PBA Bowling Tour: 1966 Season
- League: Professional Bowlers Association
- Sport: Ten-pin bowling
- Duration: December 2, 1965 – November 20, 1966

PBA Tour
- Season MVP: Wayne Zahn

PBA Tour seasons
- ← 1965 1967 →

This is a recap of the 1966 season for the Professional Bowlers Association (PBA) Tour. It was the tour's eighth season, and consisted of 29 events. Wayne Zahn won three titles, including the Firestone Tournament of Champions and the seventh PBA National Championship, making him an easy choice for the Sporting News PBA Player of the Year award.

== Tournament schedule ==
| Event | Bowling center | City | Dates | Winner |
|---|---|---|---|---|
| Eastern Open | Edison Lanes | Edison, New Jersey | Dec 2–6 | Dennis Chapis (2) |
| Charlotte Open | Freedom Lanes | Charlotte, North Carolina | Dec 9–13 | Gene Rhoda (3) |
| Western Open | Saratoga Lanes | San Jose, California | Jan 4–8 | Jim Godman (1) |
| Denver Open | Broadway Bowl | Denver, Colorado | Jan 11–15 | Dick Weber (16) |
| Hialeah-Miami Open | Hialeah Lanes | Hialeah, Florida | Feb 1–5 | Les Schissler (3) |
| Mobile-Sertoma Open | Florida Lanes | Mobile, Alabama | Feb 8–12 | Mike Limongello (2) |
| Fresno Open | Sunnyside Bowl | Fresno, California | Feb 15–19 | Dick Weber (17) |
| Las Vegas Open | Showboat Lanes | Las Vegas, Nevada | Feb 22–26 | Skee Foremsky (1) |
| Miller High Life Open | Bowlero Lanes | Milwaukee, Wisconsin | Mar 1–5 | Bill Lillard (1) |
| St. Paul Open | All-Star Bowl | St. Paul, Minnesota | Mar 8–12 | Gene Rhoda (4) |
| Buckeye Open | Imperial Lanes | Toledo, Ohio | Mar 15–19 | Pete Tountas (2) |
| Greater Buffalo Open | Fairlanes | Depew, New York | Mar 22–26 | Bobby Jacks (1) |
| Firestone Tournament of Champions | Riviera Lanes | Akron, Ohio | Mar 29 – Apr 2 | Wayne Zahn (4) |
| Seattle Open | Ballinger Bowl | Seattle, Washington | Jun 9–12 | Wayne Zahn (5) |
| Portland Open | Valley Lanes | Portland, Oregon | Jun 16–19 | Don Johnson (2) |
| Fresno Open | Cedar Lanes | Fresno, California | Jun 22–26 | Les Schissler (4) |
| Tucson Squirt Open | Cactus Bowl | Tucson, Arizona | Jul 1–4 | Johnny Guenther (2) |
| Southern California Open | Encino Bowl | Encino, California | Jul 7–10 | Barry Asher (1) |
| Fort Worth Open | Meadowbrook Lanes | Fort Worth, Texas | Jul 14–17 | Dick Ritger (1) |
| Reading Open | Hiester Lanes | Reading, Pennsylvania | Jul 28–31 | Dick Ritger (2) |
| U.S. Coast Guard Open | Starlite Lanes | Grand Haven, Michigan | Aug 2–5 | George Howard (4) |
| Brockton Open | Westgate Lanes | Brockton, Massachusetts | Aug 11–14 | Bobby Jacks (2) |
| Waukegan Open | Bertrand Bowl | Waukegan, Illinois | Aug 18–21 | Bobby Jacks (3) |
| Fort Smith Open | Midland Bowl | Fort Smith, Arkansas | Aug 25–28 | Johnny Petraglia (1) |
| Labor Day Classic | Hart Bowl | Dallas, Texas | Sep 2–5 | Bud Horn (1) |
| Crescent City Open | Mardi Gras Bowl | New Orleans, Louisiana | Sep 8–12 | Barry Asher (2) |
| Seventh Annual PBA National Championship | Garden City Bowl | Garden City, New York | Nov 1–6 | Wayne Zahn (6) |
| Camden PBA Open | Camden Lanes | Camden, New Jersey | Nov 9–12 | Ralph Engan (1) |
| Baltimore Open | Fair Lanes-Colt | Baltimore, Maryland | Nov 17–20 | Jim Stefanich (1) |
