= 2004–05 PBA Tour season =

PBA Bowling Tour: 2004–05 Season
- League: Professional Bowlers Association
- Sport: Ten-pin bowling
- Duration: September 14, 2004 – April 10, 2005

PBA Tour
- Season MVP: Patrick Allen

PBA Tour seasons
- ← 2003–04 2005–06 →

This is a recap of the 2004–05 season of the Professional Bowlers Association (PBA) Tour. It was the tour's 46th season and consisted of 21 events. A major change to the tour this season was the move to an "exempt" format for most standard events. In this format, 58 players (previous season titlists, winners of PBA majors who gained multi-year exemptions, or those finishing high enough on the previous season's points list) automatically qualified for the top 64 each week. The other six spots were filled from a Tour Qualifying Round (TQR) held on the first day of the tournament.

Patrick Allen won three titles, including a major at the Denny's World Championship, made the top five at all four majors, and captured PBA Player of the Year honors. Danny Wiseman won his first major title and 11th title overall at the Miller High Life ABC Masters. Chris Barnes was victorious at the 62nd U.S. Open, while Steve Jaros won the season-ending Dexter Tournament of Champions.

After the Professional Women's Bowling Association (PWBA) folded in 2003, the PBA opened its membership to women for the first time this season. Missy Bellinder (now Missy Parkin) was the first woman to become a PBA member. Liz Johnson became the first woman to qualify for a PBA Tournament when she made match play at the Uniroyal Tire Classic. Later in the season at the Banquet Open, she became the first woman to make the TV finals of a PBA event, and the first woman to defeat a man (Wes Malott) in a televised PBA Tour event. Liz was then defeated by Tommy Jones in the championship match, finishing second.

Also during the season, Walter Ray Williams, Jr. became the second bowler in history to reach 40 career PBA titles (joining Earl Anthony), while Parker Bohn III became the fifth bowler to reach 30 career titles.

== Tournament schedule ==
Event	City	Dates	Winner
Dydo Japan Cup	Yokohama, Japan	Sep 14–20	Tommy Jones (1)
Miller High Life ABC Masters	Milwaukee, Wisconsin	Oct 24–31	Danny Wiseman (11)
PBA Chicago Open	Vernon Hills, Illinois	Nov 3–7	Brian Himmler (3)
PBA Uniroyal Tire Classic	Wickliffe, Ohio	Nov 10–14	Walter Ray Williams, Jr. (40)
PBA BowlersParadise.com Open	Valley Park, Missouri	Nov 17–21	Rick Lawrence (2)
PBA Pepsi Open	Wichita, Kansas	Nov 23–28	Jason Hurd (2)
PBA Denver Open	Lakewood, Colorado	Dec 1–5	Tommy Jones (2)
PBA Earl Anthony Medford Classic	Medford, Oregon	Dec 8–12	Mike Wolfe (1)
PBA Storm Orange County Classic	Fountain Valley, California	Dec 15–19	Brian Voss (23)
PBA GEICO Open	Mesa, Arizona	Jan 5–9	Mika Koivuniemi (5)
PBA El Paso Classic	El Paso, Texas	Jan 12–16	Parker Bohn III (30)
PBA Dallas Open	Dallas, Texas	Jan 19–23	Patrick Allen (3)
PBA Birmingham Open	Trussville, Alabama	Jan 26–30	Patrick Allen (4)
PBA Atlanta Classic	Norcross, Georgia	Feb 2–6	Norm Duke (22)
PBA Jackson-Hewitt Tax Service Open	Fairlawn, Ohio	Feb 9–13	Amleto Monacelli (19)
62nd U.S. Open	North Brunswick, New Jersey	Feb 13–20	Chris Barnes (6)
PBA Cambridge Credit Classic	West Babylon, New York	Feb 23–27	Tommy Jones (3)
PBA Baby Ruth Real Deal Classic	Indianapolis, Indiana	Mar 2–6	Mika Koivuniemi (6)
PBA Banquet Open	Wyoming, Michigan	Mar 16–20	Tommy Jones (4)
Denny's World Championship	Taylor, Michigan	Mar 26 – Apr 3	Patrick Allen (5)
Dexter Tournament of Champions	Uncasville, Connecticut	Apr 6–10	Steve Jaros (7)
