= 2001–02 PBA Tour season =

PBA Bowling Tour: 2001–02 Season
- League: Professional Bowlers Association
- Sport: Ten-pin bowling
- Duration: January 9, 2001 – March 17, 2002

PBA Tour
- Season MVP: Parker Bohn III

PBA Tour seasons
- ← 2000 2002–03 →

This is a recap of the 2001–02 season for the Professional Bowlers Association (PBA) tour. It was the tour's 43rd season. This was a transitional season for the PBA Tour following its sale in April 2000. After holding nine events in the early part of 2001, the PBA announced it was moving to a "seasonal" (September–March) National Tour format. The first event under this new format would have been the Wichita Open on September 13, but it was cancelled due to the September 11th attacks. An additional 21 events were held in this time frame, for a total of 30 events in 2001–02.

Parker Bohn III won his second PBA Player of the Year award in three seasons, after posting five titles on the season. The season featured two PBA World Championship events. The first, in 2001, was won by Walter Ray Williams, Jr. The second, in 2002, offered an unprecedented $120,000 first prize and was won by Doug Kent. There were also two ABC Masters events, one in each calendar year. Parker Bohn III won the 2001 event, while amateur Brett Wolfe won the 2002 event.

The season's other major, the U.S. Open was won by Mika Koivuniemi.

With his win in the Silicon Valley Open, Mike Aulby became the only bowler in history to win at least one standard PBA Tour title in four different decades.

== Tournament schedule ==
Event	City	Dates	Winner
NBS National/Senior Doubles	Reno, Nevada	Jan 9–14	Parker Bohn III (25), Rohn Morton
Silicon Valley Open	Daly City, California	Jan 16–21	Mike Aulby (27)
The Orleans Casino Open	Las Vegas, Nevada	Jan 21–25	Ryan Shafer (3)
PBA World Championship	Toledo, Ohio	Jan 28 – Feb 4	Walter Ray Williams, Jr. (33)
Parker Bohn III Empire State Open	Latham, New York	Feb 7–11	Parker Bohn III (26)
Tar Heel Open	Burlington, North Carolina	Feb 13–18	Ricky Ward (5)
The Villages PBA Open	The Villages, Florida	Feb 20–24	Jason Couch (9)
The Battle at Little Creek	Virginia Beach, Virginia	Mar 1–4	Steve Wilson (3)
ABC Masters	Reno, Nevada	Jun 11–16	Parker Bohn III (27)
Japan Cup	Tokyo, Japan	Sep 5–9	Bob Learn, Jr. (5)
PBA Peoria Open	Peoria, Illinois	Sep 20–25	Kurt Pilon (1)
PBA Greater Nashville Open	Hendersonville, Tennessee	Sep 27 – Oct 2	Chris Barnes (3)
PBA Miller High Life Open	Indianapolis, Indiana	Oct 4–9	Dave Arnold (3)
PBA Great Lakes Classic	Grand Rapids, Michigan	Oct 11–16	Pete Weber (26)
PBA Greater Detroit Classic	Taylor, Michigan	Oct 18–23	Patrick Allen (1)
PBA Johnny Petraglia Open	North Brunswick, New Jersey	Oct 25–30	Danny Wiseman (9)
PBA Greater Cincinnati Classic	Erlanger, Kentucky	Nov 6–11	Walter Ray Williams, Jr. (34)
PBA Long Island Open	Syosset, New York; Uncasville, Connecticut	Nov 13–18	Tommy Delutz, Jr. (2)
PBA Greater Louisville Open	Louisville, Kentucky	Nov 21–25	Pete Weber (27)
Bowling's U.S. Open	Fountain Valley, California	Dec 2–9	Mika Koivuniemi (2)
PBA Earl Anthony Memorial Classic	Kirkland, Washington	Jan 1–6	Parker Bohn III (28)
PBA Medford Open	Medford, Oregon	Jan 8–13	Ricky Ward (6)
ABC Masters	Reno, Nevada	Jan 15–20	Brett Wolfe (amateur)
PBA Las Vegas Open	Las Vegas, Nevada	Jan 19–24	Brian Voss (21)
PBA Dallas Open	Dallas, Texas	Jan 29 – Feb 3	Ritchie Allen (1)
PBA Columbia 300 Tar Heel Open	Burlington, North Carolina	Feb 5–9	Pete Weber (28)
PBA Empire State Open	Latham, New York	Feb 13–17	Robert Smith (3)
PBA Flagship Open	Erie, Pennsylvania	Feb 20–24	Steve Wilson (4)
PBA World Championship	Toledo, Ohio	Feb 24 – Mar 3	Doug Kent (5)
The Battle at Little Creek	Virginia Beach, Virginia	Mar 13–17	Parker Bohn III (29)
