= 2003–04 PBA Tour season =

PBA Bowling Tour: 2003–04 Season
- League: Professional Bowlers Association
- Sport: Ten-pin bowling
- Duration: September 19, 2003 – March 21, 2004

PBA Tour
- Season MVP: Mika Koivuniemi

PBA Tour seasons
- ← 2002–03 2004–05 →

This is a recap of the 2003–04 season for the Professional Bowlers Association (PBA) Tour. It was the tour's 45th season and consisted of 21 events.

Finland's Mika Koivuniemi made seven TV finals, won twice on the season, and joined Venezuela's Amleto Monacelli as the only international players to ever win the PBA Player of the Year award. Mika also rolled the PBA's 16th televised 300 game this season.

Patrick Healey Jr. ended the three-event run by Jason Couch at the Tournament of Champions, one of two titles that Healey won on the season. Walter Ray Williams, Jr. was victorious at the ABC Masters.

After becoming just the fourth bowler to reach 30 career PBA titles earlier in the year, Pete Weber won his 31st at the 61st U.S. Open. It was Weber's third career U.S. Open crown. The final major of the season, the PBA World Championship, was won by 49-year-old Tom Baker for his first win in seven years.

== Tournament schedule ==
Event	City	Dates	Winner
Oranamin C Japan Cup	Tokyo, Japan	Sep 19–21	Chris Barnes (5)
PBA Banquet Open	Council Bluffs, Iowa	Oct 8–12	Robert Smith (5)
PBA Greater Kansas City Classic	Blue Springs, Missouri	Oct 15–19	Norm Duke (21)
PBA Miller High Life Open	Vernon Hills, Illinois	Oct 22–26	Brian Himmler (2)
PBA Pepsi Open	Grand Rapids, Michigan	Oct 29 – Nov 2	Jason Couch (11)
PBA Toledo Open	Toledo, Ohio	Nov 5–9	Steve Jaros (4)
PBA Greater Philadelphia Open	Springfield Twp., Pennsylvania	Nov 12–16	Patrick Allen (2)
PBA Empire State Open	Latham, New York	Nov 19–23	Ryan Shafer (4)
PBA GEICO Open	West Babylon, New York	Nov 26–30	Patrick Healey Jr. (2)
PBA Cambridge Credit Classic	Windsor Locks, Connecticut	Dec 3–7	Mika Koivuniemi (3)
Dexter Tournament of Champions at Mohegan Sun	Uncasville, Connecticut	Dec 11–14	Patrick Healey Jr. (3)
PBA Storm Earl Anthony Classic	Tacoma, Washington	Jan 7–11	Walter Ray Williams, Jr. (38)
PBA Medford Open	Medford, Oregon	Jan 14–18	Pete Weber (30)
ABC Masters	Reno, Nevada	Jan 20–25	Walter Ray Williams, Jr. (39)
PBA Reno Open	Reno, Nevada	Jan 25–29	Mika Koivuniemi (4)
61st U.S. Open	Fountain Valley, California	Feb 2–8	Pete Weber (31)
Odor Eaters Open	Tucson, Arizona	Feb 11–15	Robert Smith (6)
Days Inn Open	Dallas, Texas	Feb 18–22	Steve Jaros (5)
Baby Ruth Real Deal Classic	Belleville, Illinois	Feb 25–29	Mike Scroggins (2)
Uniroyal Tire Classic	Indianapolis, Indiana	Mar 3–7	Steve Jaros (6)
PBA World Championship	Taylor, Michigan	Mar 15–21	Tom Baker (10)
