= 1997 PBA Tour season =

PBA Bowling Tour: 1997 Season
- League: Professional Bowlers Association
- Sport: Ten-pin bowling
- Duration: January 21 – December 14, 1997

PBA Tour
- Season MVP: Walter Ray Williams, Jr.

PBA Tour seasons
- ← 1996 1998 →

This is a recap of the 1997 season for the Professional Bowlers Association (PBA) Tour. It was the tour's 39th season, and consisted of 28 events.

John Gant won the season-opening Brunswick World Tournament of Champions for his first major title, while Rick Steelsmith was victorious at the PBA National Championship.

Walter Ray Williams, Jr. won three titles on the season, and was honored with his second consecutive PBA Player of the Year award and fourth overall.

At the Ebonite Challenge in Rochester, New York, Steve Hoskins rolled the PBA's 12th televised 300 game, and also went on to win the tournament.

1997 also marked the end of ABC-TV's affiliation with the PBA Tour, as its Professional Bowlers Tour series came to a close after 36 years.

== Tournament schedule ==
Event	Bowling center	City	Dates	Winner
Brunswick World Tournament of Champions	National Bowling Stadium	Reno, Nevada	Jan 21–25	John Gant (4)
Columbia 300 Open	Highland Lanes	Austin, Texas	Jan 28 – Feb 1	Walter Ray Williams, Jr. (22)
Tucson Open	Golden Pin Lanes	Tucson, Arizona	Feb 4–8	Pete Weber (22)
Brentwood Classic	Harvest Park Bowl	Brentwood, California	Feb 11–15	John Mazza (7)
Northwest Classic	Fiesta Bowl	Richland, Washington	Feb 18–22	Brian Voss (17)
Oregon Open	Hollywood Bowl	Portland, Oregon	Feb 24–28	Jim Johnson Jr. (1)
AC-Delco Classic	Cal Bowl	Lakewood, California	Mar 4–8	Parker Bohn III (12)
Showboat Invitational	Showboat Bowling Center	Las Vegas, Nevada	Mar 9–15	Parker Bohn III (13)
Peoria Open	Landmark Recreation Center	Peoria, Illinois	Mar 18–22	Wayne Webb (19)
PBA National Championship	Ducat's Imperial Lanes	Toledo, Ohio	Mar 22–29	Rick Steelsmith (2)
Flagship Open	Eastway Lanes/Erie Civic Center	Erie, Pennsylvania	Apr 1–5	Tim Criss (1)
Bud Light Championship	Sports Plus	Lake Grove, New York	Apr 8–12	Wayne Webb (20)
Comfort Inn Classic	Crown Lanes	Tampa, Florida	Apr 15–19	Pete Weber (23)
Greater Sebring Open	Kegel Bowling Center	Sebring, Florida	Apr 21–26	Tim Criss (2)
Brunswick Johnny Petraglia Open	Carolier Lanes	North Brunswick, New Jersey	May 6–10	Walter Ray Williams, Jr. (23)
IOF Foresters Open	Classic Bowl	Mississauga, Ontario	May 13–17	Norm Duke (12)
Harrisburg Open	ABC North Lanes	Harrisburg, Pennsylvania	May 27–31	Tom Baker (9)
Greater Detroit Open	Taylor Lanes	Taylor, Michigan	Jun 3–7	Ricky Ward (2)
Wichita Open	Northrock Lanes	Wichita, Kansas	Jun 10–14	Brian Voss (18)
St. Clair Classic	St. Clair Bowl	Fairview Heights, Illinois	Jun 17–21	Walter Ray Williams, Jr. (24)
Oronamin C Japan Cup	Tokyo Port Bowl	Tokyo, Japan	Sep 18–21	Doug Kent (2)
Ebonite Challenge 1	Bradley Bowl	Windsor Locks, Connecticut	Oct 4–8	Norm Duke (13)
Ebonite Challenge 2	Marcel's Olympic Bowl	Rochester, New York	Oct 11–15	Steve Hoskins (5)
Mobil 1 Classic	Bay Lanes	Bay City, Michigan	Oct 18–22	Amleto Monacelli (17)
Ebonite Challenge 3	Woodland Bowl	Indianapolis, Indiana	Oct 25–29	John Mazza (8)
Ebonite Classic	Pinboys of Western Branch	Chesapeake, Virginia	Nov 1–5	Amleto Monacelli (18)
Bayer/Brunswick Touring Players Championship	Funfest Entertainment Center	Pittsburgh, Pennsylvania	Nov 8–12	Steve Hoskins (6)
Merit Mixed Doubles Championship	Orleans Bowling Center	Las Vegas, Nevada	Dec 12–14	Tim Criss (3), Carol Gianotti-Block
