= 1965 PBA Tour season =

PBA Bowling Tour: 1965 Season
- League: Professional Bowlers Association
- Sport: Ten-pin bowling
- Duration: December 10, 1964 – November 27, 1965

PBA Tour
- Season MVP: Dick Weber

PBA Tour seasons
- ← 1964 1966 →

This is a recap of the 1965 season for the Professional Bowlers Association (PBA) Tour. It was the tour's seventh season, and consisted of 32 events. Dave Davis won the first two titles of his career, including the sixth PBA National Championship, but it was PBA legend Dick Weber who was honored with the Sporting News PBA Player of the Year award. The second-ever PBA Firestone Tournament of Champions was held this season, and featured all PBA titlists since the inaugural 1962 event. The tournament offered a then-PBA record $25,000 first prize, and was won by Billy Hardwick. Following this season, the PBA announced that the Tournament of Champions would be an annual event.

Buzz Fazio won the season-opening tournament on December 14, 1964 for his second PBA title. His victory made him the oldest player (56 years, 307 days) to capture a standard PBA Tour title—a record that would not be broken until 1995 (by 57-year-old John Handegard).

== Tournament schedule ==
Event	Bowling center	City	Dates	Winner
Northern California PBA Open	Country Club Lanes	Sacramento, California	Dec 10–14	Buzz Fazio (2)
Southern California PBA Open	Kona Lanes	Costa Mesa, California	Dec 17–21	Jerry Hale (1)
Hialeah-Miami PBA Open	Hialeah Lanes	Hialeah, Florida	Jan 26–30	Billy Golembiewski (3)
Mobile Sertoma PBA Open	Florida Bowl	Mobile, Alabama	Feb 2–6	Billy Golembiewski (4)
Parkersburg PBA Open	Emerson Lanes	Parkersburg, West Virginia	Feb 8–12	Fred Lening (2)
Thunderbird PBA Open	Thunderbird Lanes	Wichita, Kansas	Feb 16–20	Dick Weber (14)
Pikes Peak PBA Open	Classic Lanes	Colorado Springs, Colorado	Feb 22–26	Dave Soutar (2)
Oklahoma City PBA Open	66 Bowl	Oklahoma City, Oklahoma	Mar 2–6	Mike Limongello (1)
Madison PBA Open	North Gate Bowl	Madison, Wisconsin	Mar 9–13	Earl Johnson (5)
Continental Open	Continental Lanes	Roseville, Michigan	Mar 16–20	Bob Strampe (2)
Fair Lanes PBA Open	Fairanes	Buffalo, New York	Mar 23–27	Bill Allen (8)
Insurance City PBA Classic	Meadow Lanes	Hartford, Connecticut	Mar 30 – Apr 3	Bill Allen (9)
PBA Firestone Tournament of Champions	Firestone Bowlarama	Akron, Ohio	Apr 5–10	Billy Hardwick (8)
Venezuelan PBA Open	Pin Cinco Lanes	Caracas, Venezuela	May 3–9	Harry Smith (8)
Seattle PBA Open	Robin Hood Lanes	Seattle, Washington	Jun 3–6	Gene Rhoda (1)
Portland PBA Open	Valley Lanes	Portland, Oregon	Jun 10–13	Mike McGrath (1)
San Jose PBA Open	Saratoga Lanes	San Jose, California	Jun 17–20	Bill Tucker (1)
Tucson Squirt PBA Open	Cactus Bowl	Tucson, Arizona	Jul 1–4	Harry Smith (9)
Salt Lake City PBA Open	Ritz Classic Bowl	Salt Lake City, Utah	Jul 8–11	Dave Davis (1)
Denver PBA Open	Broadmoor Bowl	Denver, Colorado	Jul 15–18	Harry Smith (10)
Louisville PBA Open	Thelmal Lanes	Louisville, Kentucky	Jul 22–25	Gene Rhoda (2)
Boston PBA Open	Westgate Lanes	Brockton, Massachusetts	Aug 12–15	Johnny Meyer (2)
Bergen Mall PBA Open	Tenpin-on-the-Mall	Paramus, New Jersey	Aug 19–22	Carmen Salvino (6)
Bertrand PBA Open	Bertrand Bowl	Waukegan, Illinois	Aug 26–29	Tom Harnisch (1)
PBA Labor Day Classic	Hart Bowl	Dallas, Texas	Sep 3–6	Sam Baca (1)
Birmingham PBA Open	Roebuck Lanes	Birmingham, Alabama	Sep 9–12	Carmen Salvino (7)
Nashville-Kiwanis PBA Open	Tusculum Lanes	Nashville, Tennessee	Sep 16–19	Gary Martineau (1)
Houston PBA Open	Lamar Lanes	Houston, Texas	Sep 23–26	Dick Weber (15)
Northern California PBA Open	L&I Castle Lanes	San Francisco, California	Sep 30 – Oct 3	Bob Strampe (3)
Oxnard PBA Open	Tournament Bowl	Oxnard, California	Oct 7–10	Johnny Guenther (1)
Las Vegas PBA Open	Showboat Lanes	Las Vegas, Nevada	Oct 12–15	Bob Collatos (1)
Sixth Annual PBA National Championship	Continental Lanes	Roseville, Michigan	Nov 21–27	Dave Davis (2)
