= Jack Biondolillo =

American professional ten-pin bowler (1940–2021)

- Born: August 30, 1940; Houston, Texas, U.S.
- Died: October 2, 2021 (aged 81); Houston, Texas, U.S.
- Occupation: Professional ten-pin bowler
- Years active: 1959–1972

Jack Joseph Biondolillo (August 30, 1940 – October 2, 2021) was an American professional bowler and member of the Professional Bowlers Association (PBA).

Biondolillo won two PBA titles in his career, both in 1963, and he finished runner-up in a PBA tournament six times. His first title at the Birmingham Coca-Cola PBA Open featured a win over Don Carter in the final match.

Biondolillo became most famous for rolling the first-ever televised perfect 300 game in PBA Tour history, which was also the first 300 game to be broadcast live on national television in the U.S. This occurred April 1, 1967 against Les Schissler in the opening match of the Firestone Tournament of Champions finals, with an estimated 15 million viewers watching on ABC-TV. Biondolillo did not go on to win the tournament; he defeated Mike Durbin in the next match before losing to Don Johnson in the semifinal round. He won $5,000 for his third-place finish, but earned a $10,000 bonus for the perfect game.

Hampered by an ankle injury that occurred in 1968, Biondolillo retired from the PBA in 1972. He won the 1971 Japan Gold Cup, the predecessor to the later Round1 Japan Cup, then on the Japan Professional Bowling Association (JPBA) Tour. A Houston, Texas native, Biondolillo was inducted into the Greater Houston USBC Hall of Fame in 1981, and the Texas State Bowling Hall of Fame in 1988.

Biondolillo died on October 2, 2021, from dementia and complicating kidney failure at the age of 81.
