= 1998 PBA Tour season =

PBA Bowling Tour: 1998 Season
- League: Professional Bowlers Association
- Sport: Ten-pin bowling
- Duration: January 20 – December 13, 1998

PBA Tour
- Season MVP: Walter Ray Williams, Jr.

PBA Tour seasons
- ← 1997 1999 →

This is a recap of the 1998 season for the Professional Bowlers Association (PBA) Tour. It was the tour's 40th season, and consisted of 26 events.

Walter Ray Williams, Jr. joined Earl Anthony and Mark Roth as the only PBA players to win three consecutive PBA Player of the Year awards. Williams won five titles on the season, including a victory at the BPAA U.S. Open. The POY award was his fifth overall, one behind Anthony's record of six.

Pete Weber captured his fifth major title and second PBA National Championship of his career. Bryan Goebel won the Brunswick World Tournament of Champions for his first major title.

For the first time, the ABC Masters was recognized as an official stop on the PBA Tour. Parker Bohn III shot the PBA's 12th televised 300 game in the opening match of the championship round, but it was Mike Aulby who won the event. It was Aulby's third ABC Masters title, and 26th PBA title.

== Tournament schedule ==
Event	Bowling center	City	Dates	Winner
Brentwood Classic	Harvest Park Bowl	Brentwood, California	Jan 20–24	Parker Bohn III (14)
Long John Silver's Classic	Leisure Lanes	Albuquerque, New Mexico	Jan 27–31	Ricky Ward (3)
Columbia 300 Open	Highland Lanes	Austin, Texas	Feb 3–7	Roger Bowker (5)
Peoria Open	Landmark Recreation Center	Peoria, Illinois	Feb 10–14	David Traber (4)
PBA National Championship	Ducat's Imperial Lanes	Toledo, Ohio	Feb 16–21	Pete Weber (24)
Storm Flagship Open	Eastway Lanes/Erie Civic Center	Erie, Pennsylvania	Feb 24–28	Walter Ray Williams, Jr. (25)
BPAA U.S. Open	AMF Milford Lanes	Milford, Connecticut	Apr 3–11	Walter Ray Williams, Jr. (26)
Bayer/Brunswick Touring Players Championship	Stonehenge Family Fun Center	Akron, Ohio	Apr 13–18	Dennis Horan (3)
Tucson Open	Golden Pin Lanes	Tucson, Arizona	Apr 28 – May 2	Norm Duke (14)
ABC Masters	National Bowling Stadium	Reno, Nevada	May 4–9	Mike Aulby (26)
Greater Detroit Open	Taylor Lanes	Taylor, Michigan	May 12–16	Parker Bohn III (15)
Brunswick Johnny Petraglia Open	Carolier Lanes	North Brunswick, New Jersey	May 19–23	Brian Voss (19)
Greater Harrisburg Open	ABC West Lanes	Mechanicsburg, Pennsylvania	May 26–30	Parker Bohn III (16)
Showboat Invitational	Showboat Bowling Center	Las Vegas, Nevada	Jun 7–13	Jason Couch (5)
AC-Delco Classic	Cal Bowl	Lakewood, California	Jun 16–20	Steve Hoskins (7)
PBA Oregon Open	Hollywood Bowl	Portland, Oregon	Jun 23–27	Danny Wiseman (7)
PBA Northwest Classic	Fiesta Bowl	Richland, Washington	Jun 28 – Jul 1	Tim Criss (4)
Oronamin C Japan Cup	Tokyo Port Bowl	Tokyo, Japan	Sep 17–20	Parker Bohn III (17)
National Finance Championship	Virginia Beach Pavilion	Virginia Beach, Virginia	Oct 3–7	Brian Voss (20)
Brunswick Long Island Open	Coram Country Lanes	Coram, New York	Oct 10–14	Walter Ray Williams, Jr. (27)
Rochester Open	Marcel's Olympic Bowl	Rochester, New York	Oct 17–21	Norm Duke (15)
Bay City Classic	Bay Lanes	Bay City, Michigan	Oct 24–28	Walter Ray Williams, Jr. (28)
National Finance Challenge	Woodland Bowl	Indianapolis, Indiana	Oct 31 – Nov 4	Walter Ray Williams, Jr. (29)
Brunswick Circuit Pro Bowling Classic	Northrock Lanes	Wichita, Kansas	Nov 7–11	Norm Duke (16)
Brunswick World Tournament of Champions	Incred-A-Bowl	Overland Park, Kansas	Nov 14–21	Bryan Goebel (9)
Philip Morris Mixed Doubles	Orleans Bowling Center	Las Vegas, Nevada	Dec 11–13	Steve Hoskins (8), Kim Canady
