= John Gant (bowler) =

American professional ten-pin bowler

Personal information
- Nickname: Buzzsaw
- Born: Independence, KY, U.S.
- Education: University of Cincinnati
- Years active: 1984–2018
- Height: 6 ft 3 in (191 cm)

Bowling Information
- Affiliation: PBA
- Rookie year: 1984
- Dominant hand: Left
- Wins: 4 PBA Tour (1 major); 1984 PBA Rookie of the Year
- 300-games: 8

John Gant of Medford, Massachusetts is a former professional 10-pin bowler who was a member of the Professional Bowlers Association, bowling on the PBA Tour. During his time on tour, John won four titles (including one major), along with two runner-up finishes and an additional thirteen appearances in the top-five.

Before joining the PBA Tour, Gant was a 4-year member of the Cincinnati Bearcats baseball team as a pitcher from 1977 to 1980.

During the 1984 Tour season, Gant won the Denver Open with a 223–173 victory over Steve Cook in the championship match. Additionally in 1984, John finished fifth at the Miller High Life Classic in Miami. These accomplishments helped Gant win the PBA Rookie of the Year award.

For the 1986 Tour season, Gant reached the televised finals in seven tournaments, including one runner-up finish at the Budweiser Classic (defeated by Dave Ferraro in the championship match 254–221). In addition, John became just the second left-hander to win the George Young High Average award with a 214.38 average over 751 tournament games.

Going more than two years absent from the winners' circle, Gant won the 1987 True Value Open in Peoria, Illinois. Qualified as the top seed in the final rounds, John defeated Parker Bohn III 223–190 in the championship match.

Gant returned to the tour in 1995 after taking a six-year leave. On March 11, John claimed his third career title by winning the Brunswick Johnny Petraglia Open. Earning the #4 seed for the finals, he defeated #5 seed Randy Pedersen in the first match 224–219, #3 seed Bob Belmont in the second 236–227, Billy Myers Jr. in the semifinals 236–217, and top-seeded Ken McNeely in the championship match 234–216.

John's last tour title and lone major was earned at the 1997 PBA Tournament of Champions. As the final round's #2 qualifier, he defeated Parker Bohn III 238–224 in the semifinal match and Mike Aulby 208–187 in the title match.

== PBA Tour titles ==
Major championships are in bold type.

1. 1984 Denver Open (Denver, CO)
2. 1987 True Value Open (Peoria, IL)
3. 1995 Brunswick Johnny Petraglia Open (North Brunswick, NJ)
4. **1997 Brunswick World Tournament of Champions** (Reno, NV)
