= 2000 PBA Tour season =

PBA Bowling Tour: 2000 Season
- League: Professional Bowlers Association
- Sport: Ten-pin bowling
- Duration: January 11 – November 21, 2000

PBA Tour
- Season MVP: Norm Duke

PBA Tour seasons
- ← 1999 2001–02 →

This is a recap of the 2000 season for the Professional Bowlers Association (PBA) Tour. It was the tour's 42nd season, and consisted of 19 events.

Norm Duke had three titles in the shortened season, including a major at the PBA National Championship, helping him win PBA Player of the Year honors.

Bowling's U.S. Open was won by Robert Smith for his first-ever title. The ABC Masters title went to Finnish bowler Mika Koivuniemi, while Jason Couch captured his second straight Brunswick World Tournament of Champions title.

An oddity of the season saw Chris Barnes lead every statistical category except earnings, despite setting a record by making 12 final-round appearances without a win. In other news this season, the PBA was sold to three former Microsoft executives in April, who planned to make the PBA a for-profit business. Former Nike marketing executives Steve Miller and Ian Hamilton were named President and Commissioner, respectively.

== Tournament schedule ==
Event	City	Dates	Winner
NBS National/Senior Doubles	Reno, Nevada	Jan 11–15	Dave Husted (14), Pete Couture (6)
The Orleans Casino Open	Las Vegas, Nevada	Jan 16–21	Ryan Shafer (1)
Brunswick Pro Source Don Carter Classic	Dallas, Texas	Jan 25–30	Norm Duke (17)
Chattanooga Open	Chattanooga, Tennessee	Feb 1–5	Parker Bohn III (23)
Parker Bohn III Empire State Open	Latham, New York	Feb 8–12	Pete Weber (25)
PBA National Championship	Toledo, Ohio	Feb 13–19	Norm Duke (18)
Bayer/Brunswick Touring Players Championship	Akron, Ohio	Feb 23–27	Dennis Horan Jr. (4)
ABC Masters	Albuquerque, New Mexico	Jun 12–17	Mika Koivuniemi (1)
Wichita Open	Wichita, Kansas	Jun 27 – Jul 1	Ryan Shafer (2)
MSN Open	Tucson, Arizona	Jul 4–8	Norm Duke (19)
Bowling's U.S. Open	Phoenix, Arizona	Jul 10–15	Robert Smith (1)
Oronamin C Japan Cup	Tokyo, Japan	Aug 13–17	Parker Bohn III (24)
Track Canandaigua Open	Canandaigua, New York	Oct 7–10	Walter Ray Williams, Jr. (31)
Brunswick Johnny Petraglia Open	North Brunswick, New Jersey	Oct 14–17	Walter Ray Williams, Jr. (32)
Flagship Open	Erie, Pennsylvania	Oct 21–24	Robert Smith (2)
Indianapolis Open	Indianapolis, Indiana	Oct 28–31	Doug Kent (4)
Brunswick World Tournament of Champions	Lake Zurich, Illinois	Nov 3–7	Jason Couch (8)
Columbia 300 Open	Austin, Texas	Nov 11–15	Danny Wiseman (8)
Lone Star Open	Pasadena, Texas	Nov 17–21	Steve Hoskins (10)
