= Teata Semiz =

American bowler (1934–2021)

Anthony "Teata" Semiz (April 16, 1934 – November 23, 2021) was an American professional bowler who participated on the PBA Tour and PBA Senior Tour. He was inducted into the United States Bowling Congress (USBC) Hall of Fame (Performance category) in 1991, and the Professional Bowlers Association (PBA) Hall of Fame (Veterans/Senior category) in 1998.

A resident of River Edge, New Jersey, Semiz started bowling at the age of 13 in Bergenfield, New Jersey. He became a PBA member in 1960, but did not start bowling regularly on the PBA Tour until 1968.

== Professional career ==
Semiz won 11 PBA titles (three on the PBA Tour and eight on the PBA Senior Tour), and also won both the Classic Singles and Classic All-Events titles at the 1972 ABC Open Championships. Competing in the ABC Masters, Semiz finished the 1973 event in fourth place. At the 1983 Masters, Semiz finished in seventh place and had a 300 game during the match play round. At the 1987 Masters, the 53-year old Semiz finished the tournament in fifth place.

Semiz's three PBA Tour titles were all earned by beating a future PBA Hall of Famer in the title match:

- 1968 Ebonite Open (defeated Don Johnson)
- 1970 Bellows-Valvair Open (defeated Nelson Burton Jr.)
- 1977 Burger King Open (defeated Marshall Holman)

In 1997, Semiz become the oldest player (aged 63) to win an event on the PBA Senior Tour. At that time, Semiz's 8 Senior Tour titles were the most by any player; it has since been surpassed by several bowlers. One of Semiz's most remarkable accomplishments came in 1993 in O'Fallon, Illinois when he carried journeyman pro Rich Abboud to a PBA Senior/Touring Pro Doubles victory, defeating Pete Weber and Tom Carbone in the final match.

== Personal ==
Semiz was a veteran of the U.S. Navy. Throughout his career, he divided his time between bowling tournaments, running his pro shop, and his other favorite sport – golf. After retiring from the PBA Senior Tour, Semiz continued to bowl well in league play, once rolling an 803 three-game series at the age of 80.

Semiz died in hospice care in Andover, New Jersey on November, 23, 2021 at age 87, after suffering a broken hip that led to other health issues.
