= Jim Stefanich =

American professional ten-pin bowler

Personal information
- Born: November 1, 1941 (age 84) Joliet, Illinois, U.S.
- Years active: 1965–1988
- Height: 5 ft 11 in (180 cm)

Bowling Information
- Affiliation: PBA
- Rookie year: 1965
- Dominant hand: Right (stroker delivery)
- Wins: 14 PBA Tour (2 majors)
- 300-games: 13

Jim Stefanich (born November 1, 1941) is a retired American right-handed ten-pin bowler most known for his years in the Professional Bowlers Association (PBA). Stefanich won 14 PBA Tour titles, including two major championships, and rolled the third-ever televised perfect 300 game in a PBA Tour event. He is a member of the PBA and USBC Halls of Fame.

== PBA career ==
Stefanich joined the PBA Tour in 1965, and won his first PBA title at the 1966 Baltimore Open. The next season, he qualified as the top seed in the 1967 Firestone Tournament of Champions. After witnessing the historic televised 300 game by Jack Biondolillo in the opening match of that event's final round, it was Stefanich who won the championship for his second PBA title and first major. In the title match, Stefanich and opponent Don Johnson were tied after the regulation ten frames, 227–227, with Stefanich winning 48–36 in a 9th/10th frame roll-off. He would win two more titles later in the 1967 season.

1968 was a career year for Stefanich. After winning titles in back-to-back weeks in February and a third title in April, he again won titles in consecutive weeks in June. His five titles and $67,375 in winnings (a PBA record at the time and equal to about $627,000 in 2025 dollars) earned him 1968 PBA Player of the Year honors. He also won the prestigious BPAA All-Star (predecessor to the U.S. Open) in May 1968. This was not considered a PBA title at the time, but the PBA voted in 2008 to credit BPAA All-Star events as both a PBA title and a major championship if won by a PBA member. This retroactively gave Stefanich six titles during the 1968 season.

Stefanich would win only four more PBA titles between 1970 and 1976, but he made history in the opening event of the 1974 season when he rolled the PBA’s third-ever televised 300 game (following Biondolillo in 1967 and Johnny Guenther in 1969).

Stefanich was inducted into the PBA Hall of Fame in 1980, and the USBC Hall of Fame in 1983. He was a standout in USBC Open Championships, winning seven events – one short of the record. He retired from full-time touring after the 1988 season, having officially won 13 PBA titles at the time. The total was amended to 14 titles when his 1968 BPAA All-Star win was credited.

=== PBA Tour titles ===
Major championships in bold type.

1. 1966 Baltimore Open (Baltimore, Maryland)
2. **1967 Firestone Tournament of Champions** (Akron, Ohio)
3. 1967 Fort Smith Open (Fort Smith, Arkansas)
4. 1967 U.S. Coast Guard Festival (Grand Haven, Michigan)
5. 1968 Tampa Bay-Sertoma Open (Tampa, Florida)
6. 1968 Buckeye Open (Toledo, Ohio)
7. 1968 Mobile-Sertoma Open (Mobile, Alabama)
8. **1968 BPAA All-Star** (Garden City, New York)
9. 1968 Portland Open (Portland, Oregon)
10. 1968 Fresno Open (Fresno, California)
11. 1970 Ebonite Open (Kansas City, Missouri)
12. 1970 Gansett Open (Cranston, Rhode Island)
13. 1974 Showboat Invitational (Las Vegas, Nevada)
14. 1976 Denver Open (Denver, Colorado)

== Personal ==
Stefanich was a 1959 graduate of Joliet Catholic Academy in Joliet, Illinois. He was a high-level golfer in high school, but took up bowling as a method of therapy for a broken wrist. Having decided to bowl professionally, he did not get back into golf as a serious endeavor until joining the Senior PGA Tour as a 50-year old in 1992.

== Awards and recognition ==
- PBA Player of the Year (1968)
- Inducted into PBA Hall of Fame, 1980
- Inducted into USBC Hall of Fame (Performance Category), 1983
- Inducted into Joliet Area Sports Hall of Fame, 2006
- Ranked #27 on the PBA's 2008 list of "50 Greatest Players of the Last 50 Years"
