= Gary Dickinson (bowler) =

American professional ten-pin bowler

Personal information
- Born: March 26, 1943 (age 83) Durant, Oklahoma, U.S.
- Years active: 1969–2013
- Height: 6 ft 4 in (193 cm)

Bowling Information
- Affiliation: PBA
- Rookie year: 1969
- Dominant hand: Right (stroker delivery)
- Wins: 8 PBA Tour (1 major); 12 PBA Senior Tour (2 majors)
- Sponsors: Columbia 300

Gary Dickinson of Edmond, Oklahoma, was a professional ten-pin bowler and member of the Professional Bowlers Association (PBA). He was inducted into the PBA Hall of Fame in 1988 and the USBC Hall of Fame in 1992.

During Gary's stint on the PBA Tour, he reached the top-five in more than 50 tournaments, with 19 runner-up finishes and winning 8 titles. His most notable tour victory is the 1983 U.S. Open, defeating Steve Neff 214–202 in the title match.

At the start of the PBA's 50th tour season (2008–09), Gary was recognized as one the "50 Greatest Players of the Last 50 Years" by a panel of bowling experts commissioned by the PBA. He ranked at #46, ahead of #47 Barry Asher and behind #45 Johnny Guenther.

While on the PBA Senior Tour (now called the PBA50 Tour), Gary won 12 tournament titles including 2 Senior Masters titles in 1997 and 2004. He is currently tied with three other players (Tom Baker, Dale Eagle and Tom Hess) for fourth place on the all-time PBA50 titles list. In addition, Gary won Senior Bowler of the Year honors in 1993, 1994, and 1997.

== Dickinson's PBA Titles ==
Major championships are in bold type.

=== PBA Tour ===
1. 1973 Don Carter Classic (Arcadia, CA)
2. 1973 Fort Worth Open (Fort Worth, TX)
3. 1974 Winston-Salem Open (Portland, OR)
4. 1975 Fair Lanes Open (Springfield, VA)
5. 1976 Brunswick World Open (Glendale Heights, IL)
6. 1979 Amarillo Open (Amarillo, TX)
7. 1980 Miller High Life Classic (Anaheim, CA)
8. **1983 BPAA U.S. Open** (Oak Lawn, IL)

=== Senior PBA Tour ===
1. 1993 Showboat Senior Invitational (Las Vegas, NV)
2. 1993 Hammer Senior Open (Naples, FL)
3. 1994 PBA St. Petersburg-Clearwater Senior Championship (Seminole, FL)
4. 1995 Greater Providence Senior PBA Open (East Providence, RI)
5. 1996 Tri-Cities PBA Senior Open (Richland, WA)
6. 1996 Pontiac Senior Open (Waterford, MI)
7. 1997 Northwest Senior Classic (Beaverton, OR)
8. 1997 Seattle Senior Open
9. **1997 ABC Senior Masters** (Akron, OH)
10. 1998 Glass City Senior Open (Toledo, OH)
11. **2004 ABC Senior Masters** (Las Vegas, NV)
12. 2006 Senior Northern California Classic (Brentwood, CA)

=== Additional Awards ===
- 1972, 1973 and 1974 PBA Steve Nagy Sportsmanship Award
- 1993, 1994, 1997 PBA Senior Bowler of the Year
