= Patrick Allen (bowler) =

American bowler

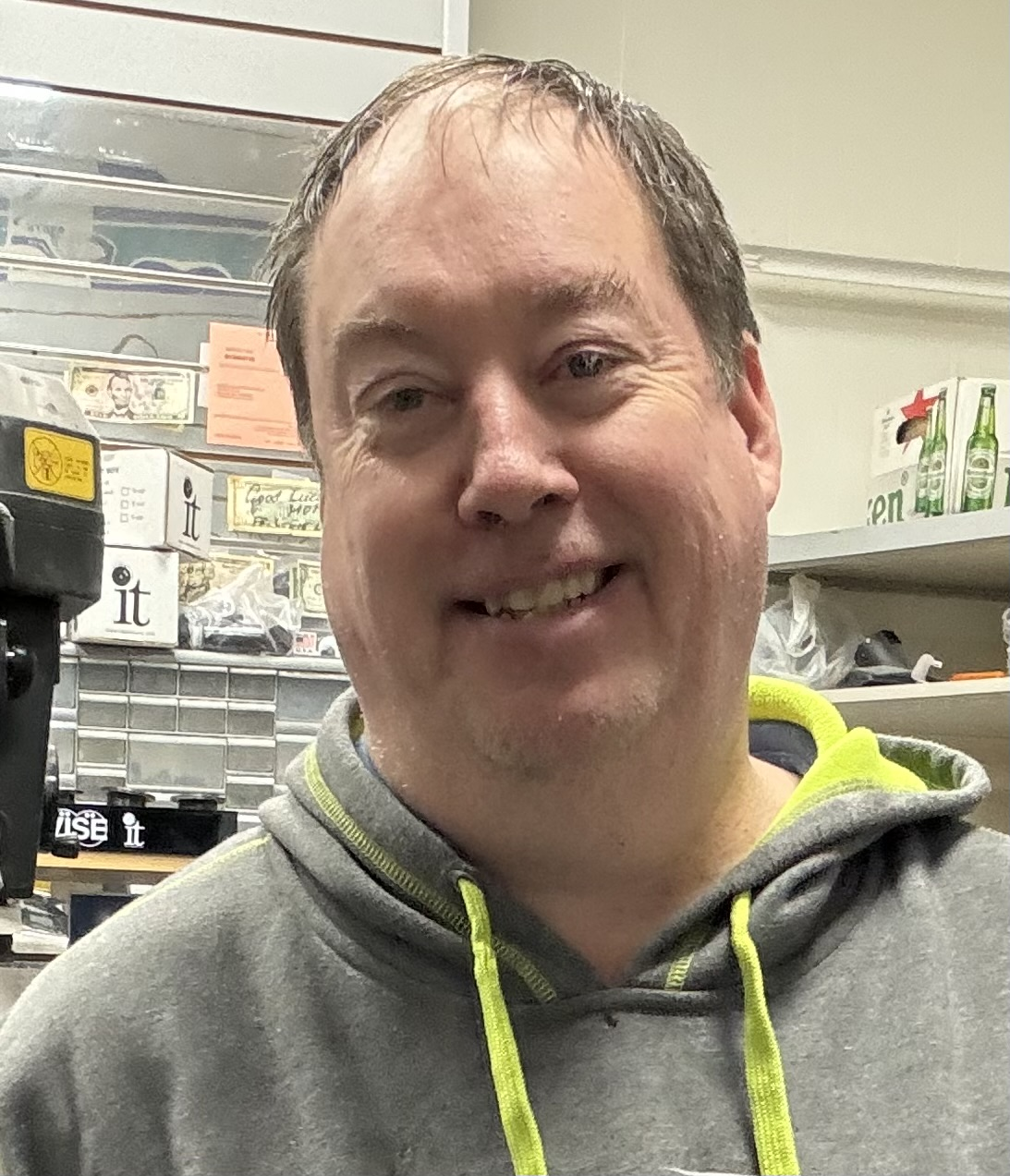

Personal information
- Born: September 23, 1970 (age 55)

Bowling Information
- Affiliation: PBA
- Rookie year: 2000
- Dominant hand: Left
- Wins: 13 PBA Tour (2 majors); 30 PBA Regional Tour
- Sponsors: Hammer Bowling

Patrick Allen (born September 23, 1970) is a left-handed ten-pin bowler on the Professional Bowlers Association (PBA) Tour. He has won 13 PBA titles, including two majors (2005 Denny's PBA World Championship and 2009 H&R Block Tournament of Champions), and is a member of the PBA Hall of Fame.

== Personal ==
A long-time resident of Tarrytown, New York, Allen relocated to Wesley Chapel, Florida for several years before returning to his home state. He now resides in Mount Kisco, New York. He owns a pro shop in Yonkers, New York at Homefield Bowl.

== PBA career ==
Allen joined the PBA in 1999, and became a full-time PBA Tour player the following year. He won his first PBA title in 2001 at the Greater Detroit Classic. His finest season as a pro came in 2004–05, when he earned PBA Player of the Year honors and led the Tour in points. That season, he made match play in 19 of 21 events, made five TV finals appearances, won three titles (including his first major) and cashed a career-high $350,740 in earnings. Allen also made the top-five in all four major tournaments in 2004–05, the only time that had been accomplished since the ABC/USBC Masters became an official PBA event in 1998. Allen is currently the last left-hander to win a PBA Player of the Year award (as of 2025).

Allen added three titles in the 2008–09 season, at the National Bowling Stadium Championship, Tournament of Champions and Dydo Japan Cup. He has not won a title since that season.

In the 2009 Pepsi Red, White and Blue Open, Allen set a PBA record for total pinfall in a 48-game qualifying block, both scratch (11,888) and with bonus pins (12,308). The record still stands as of the conclusion of the 2017 season.

Known to his fans and fellow pro bowlers as "P.A." or "Hoss," Allen became the PBA's 36th career millionaire in 2007. He was ranked #44 on the PBA's 2008 list of "50 Greatest Players of the Last 50 Years." Through the 2016 season, he had recorded 41 perfect 300 games in PBA events.

Allen also has won 30 PBA Regional Tour titles. He represented the PBA East Region and won the 2015 PBA Regional Challenge finals, a non-title event held at the PBA World Series of Bowling in Reno, NV. In the victory over defending PBA Regional Challenge champion Josh Blanchard, Allen rolled the first ten strikes of the game before leaving a 6-pin on the eleventh shot and settling for a 289 game.

In November 2025, Allen was ranked #14 on the PBA's "Best 25 Players of the Last 25 Seasons" list. His caption read: "Allen captured 11 of his 13 career titles during a dominant half-decade in the late aughts that alone would've placed him on this list. Allen is one of two southpaws (and the most recent) to have been named PBA Player of the Year of this era."

=== Hall of Fame ===
On October 1, 2018, Allen was elected to the PBA Hall of Fame. He was officially inducted at a ceremony in Arlington, Texas on January 5, 2019.

He has won over $1.5 million in his PBA career.

== Allen's PBA titles ==
Major championships are in bold type.

1. 2001 PBA Greater Detroit Classic (Taylor, Michigan)
2. 2003 PBA Greater Philadelphia Open (Springfield Twp., Pennsylvania)
3. 2005 PBA Dallas Open (Dallas, Texas)
4. 2005 PBA Birmingham Open (Trussville, Alabama)
5. **2005 Denny's PBA World Championship** (Taylor, Michigan)
6. 2005 Keystone State Championship (Mechanicsburg, Pennsylvania)
7. 2006 Great Lakes Championship (Wyoming, Michigan)
8. 2007 H&R Block Classic (Reno, Nevada)
9. 2007 Go RV’ing Classic (Council Bluffs, Iowa)
10. 2007 Lumber Liquidators Championship (Baltimore, Maryland)
11. 2009 National Bowling Stadium Championship (Reno, Nevada)
12. **2009 H&R Block Tournament of Champions** (Las Vegas, Nevada)
13. 2009 Dydo Japan Cup (Tokyo)
