= Johnny Guenther =

American professional ten-pin bowler

- Born: John Guenther; January 13, 1936
- Died: June 27, 2018 (aged 82)
- Occupation: Ten Pin Bowler
- Years active: 1962–1979

Johnny Guenther (January 13, 1936 – June 27, 2018) was an American professional ten-pin bowler from Edmonds, Washington, and a member of the Professional Bowlers Association (PBA). He is a member of both the PBA and USBC Halls of Fame. Guenther had 11 PBA Tour titles in his career, including one major championship, and rolled the PBA’s second-ever televised 300 game.

== PBA career ==
Guenther won his first PBA title on October 10, 1965 at the PBA Oxnard Open. On the way to his fourth title in San Jose, California, on February 1, 1969, Guenther rolled the PBA’s second-ever televised 300 game (the first having been accomplished by Jack Biondolillo in 1967). The feat occurred during the second of Guenther's four matches broadcast live that day. Guenther defeated future PBA Hall of Famer Don Johnson in that match, 300–189, then went on to defeat two other future Hall of Famers (Billy Hardwick and Wayne Zahn) for the title. Guenther won his lone PBA major in the 1972 PBA National Championship, topping Dick Ritger in the final match for his seventh title overall. He won his eighth and ninth titles in back-to-back weeks during the 1974 PBA season (on March 16 and March 23). His 11th and final title was earned just shy of his 40th birthday, on January 3, 1976 at the Ford Open in Arcadia, California.

While Guenther was feared on the lanes, he was well-liked off of them, winning the PBA’s Steve Nagy Sportsmanship Award three times. He was inducted into the PBA Hall of Fame in 1986, and the USBC Hall of Fame in 1988. He was ranked #45 on the PBA’s 2008 list of "50 Greatest Players of the Last 50 Years".

=== PBA Tour Titles ===
Major titles in bold type.

1. 1965 PBA Oxnard Open (Oxnard, CA)
2. 1966 Tucson Squirt Open (Tucson, AZ)
3. 1968 Miller High Life Open (Milwaukee, WI)
4. 1969 San Jose Open (San Jose, CA)
5. 1971 Andy Granatelli’s STP Classic (Kansas City, MO)
6. 1971 Mercury Open (Rochester, NY)
7. **1972 PBA National Championship** (Rochester, NY)
8. 1974 Lincoln-Mercury Open (Denver, CO)
9. 1974 Miller High Life Open (Milwaukee, WI)
10. 1975 Seattle Open (Seattle, WA)
11. 1976 Ford Open (Arcadia, CA)

== Death ==
Guenther died on June 27, 2018, following a brief illness. He was 82 years old.
