= Wayne Zahn =

American bowling player (1941–2025)

Personal information
- Born: January 20, 1941 Milwaukee, Wisconsin, U.S.
- Died: August 20, 2025 (aged 84)
- Years active: 1961–1980
- Height: 6 ft 0 in (183 cm)

Bowling Information
- Affiliation: PBA
- Dominant hand: Right
- Wins: 14 PBA Tour (3 Majors); 1966 PBA Player of the Year; 1966 BWAA Male Bowler of the Year
- 300-games: 9
- Sponsors: AMF (Staff of Champions)

Wayne Earl Zahn (January 20, 1941 – August 20, 2025) was an American professional tenpin bowler and charter member of the Professional Bowlers Association (PBA). Originally from Milwaukee, Zahn bowled out of Tempe, Arizona.

== Biography ==
Zahn began his PBA career in 1961. While on the tour, he captured 14 tournament victories (including three majors), was a runner-up seven times, and reached the top-five another 30 times.

Among Zahn's three major tournament victories, two of them were captured in 1966, the Firestone Tournament of Champions and the PBA National Championship, making him the first-ever bowler to win those two majors in the same season. On the strength of winning two majors plus the Seattle Open and taking the Tour's George Young High Average award (208.66) during the 1966 season, Zahn was tabbed the Consensus Player of the Year (earning both The Sporting News PBA Player of the Year and Bowling Writers Association of America (BWAA) Male Bowler of the Year awards).

Wayne's third major win was captured at the 1968 PBA National Championship, becoming that major's first two-time winner before Mike McGrath shortly joining him via his back-to-back titles in 1969 and 1970.

In 1980, Zahn became the youngest bowler (aged 39) to be inducted into the USBC Hall of Fame Superior Performance category. In addition, Zahn was inducted into the PBA Hall of Fame in 1981.

During the PBA's 50th season in 2008–09, Zahn was named one of the "PBA’s 50 Greatest Players of the Last 50 Years" by a panel of bowling experts commissioned by the PBA, ranking at #31, just ahead of #32 Jim Godman and behind #30 Tommy Jones.

Following a similar path of other professional bowlers, Wayne (along with Christine Zahn) became a proprietor of Zahn's Tempe Bowl in Tempe, AZ.

Zahn died on August 20, 2025, at the age of 84, having spent his final years with his family in Tempe.

== PBA Tour titles ==
Major championships are in bold type.

1. 1963 Chicago Coca-Cola PBA Open (Chicago, IL)
2. 1964 Buffalo PBA Open (Depew, NY)
3. 1964 North California PBA Open (Lodi, CA)
4. **1966 Firestone Tournament of Champions** (Akron, OH)
5. 1966 Seattle Open (Seattle, WA)
6. **1966 PBA National Championship** (Long Island, NY)
7. 1967 Durham Open (Durham, NC)
8. 1968 Houston-Sertoma Open (Houston, TX)
9. 1968 Mercury Open (Edison, NJ)
10. **1968 PBA National Championship** (New York, NY)
11. 1969 West Valley Open (Canoga Park, CA)
12. 1970 National Pro-Am Classic (Atlanta, GA)
13. 1974 Ebonite Open (Toledo, OH)
14. 1976 Showboat Invitational (Las Vegas, NV)
