= Jim Godman =

American bowling player

Personal information
- Born: James William Godman; January 5, 1946 Oakland, California, U.S.
- Died: May 3, 2001 (aged 55) Melbourne, Florida, U.S.
- Education: Tennyson High School (Hayward, California)
- Years active: 1965–1981
- Height: 6 ft 0 in (183 cm)

Sport
- Country: United States
- Sport: Ten-pin bowling
- League: PBA
- Turned pro: 1965
- Retired: 1981

Achievements and titles
- National finals: 11 PBA Tour (3 majors); PBA Rookie of the Year (1965); USBC Hall of Fame (1987); PBA Hall of Fame (1987); PBA’s 50 Greatest Players (2008 poll)

James William Godman (January 5, 1946 – May 3, 2001) was an American professional bowler who won eleven titles on the Professional Bowlers Tour, and was the first bowler to win the prestigious Tournament of Champions (then sponsored by Firestone) twice, winning in 1969 and 1973. Godman was ranked 32nd in a 2008 poll of the 50 Greatest PBA Bowlers of all-time. He is a member of the PBA and United States Bowling Congress (USBC) Halls of Fame.

He won the 1971 ABC (now USBC) Masters tournament and was also the first bowler in USBC Open Championships history to record three 700 series in one tournament.

The right-handed Godman was an early adopter of the "cranker" style of bowling, using a cupped wrist to create more ball revolutions and greater power compared to his contemporaries.

== Early life ==
Godman was born to James Richard Godman, a civil engineer, and Marian (née Neil) Godman, in Oakland, California and graduated from Tennyson High School in Hayward, California. Godman's grandfather, James Henry Godman, was a Kentucky-born Army veteran who had served in the Philippines during the Spanish-American War and settled in the San Francisco Bay Area upon his military discharge and who later became a county supervisor in Lassen County, California.

As a youth, Godman was a successful bowler in local leagues and regional events in Northern California before joining the PBA Tour in 1965.

== Professional career ==
Godman finished in the top five once in his rookie season, finishing third at the 1965 Southern California Open in Oxnard, California behind Dave Soutar and Johnny Guenther, good enough to earn PBA Rookie of the Year honors.

The following year, a 20-year old Godman won his first PBA title at the PBA Western Open in San Jose, California, advancing through the stepladder finals from the third position, defeating Bill Allen 255–207, Earl Johnson 197–151, before beating Les Schissler 208–191 for the $5,000 first prize. He would reach the finals once more in 1966, losing to Barry Asher at the Crescent City Open in New Orleans in September.

Godman won once in each of 1967 and 1968, and entered the 1969 Tournament of Champions field as a comparative underdog to tour money leader Billy Hardwick, defending champion Dave Davis (bowler), and 1967 winner Jim Stefanich. Godman, who finished sixth in the 1968 Firestone, was third behind Johnny Guenther and Dick Weber after the second eight-game block. The next day, however, he won 13 consecutive match play games, going 20–4–0 overall in the match play round, to move past Stefanich and claim the No. 1 seed for the stepladder finals. In the championship match, Godman would face off with Stefanich for the $25,000 prize. Godman started the match with seven straight strikes, building a dominant lead he would not relinquish on his way to a 266–228 victory, becoming the youngest champion in the event's five-year history. The prize money he earned in Akron, Ohio that day was more than he had earned in his entire four-year career combined up until then. Godman closed out 1969 with a win in November over Ray Bluth in the PBA Mercury Open in St. Louis to finish the season second to Billy Hardwick on the money list.

The next year was a difficult one for Godman professionally as he only reached the top 5 once, finishing third in Kansas City, Kansas at the Ebonite Open. Godman rallied in 1971, winning the ABC Masters in May and finishing in the top 5 six times, beating Terry Booth for the PBA Tucson Open in July. The next year was again a struggle. Though he did win in Grand Rapids, Michigan in August, he only made two top-5 appearances.

Godman qualified second for the 1973 Tournament of Champions, behind tournament leader Barry Asher. In the semi-final match against Dick Weber, Godman held strong for a 227–192 victory as Weber struggled on the right lane of the televised pair. Godman was clean in the championship match, striking in the fourth, fifth, and sixth frames while Asher opened in his fifth frame. A double in the ninth and tenth frames clinched the title for Godman. The final score was 224–200 and Godman became the first bowler to win the Tournament of Champions twice. Godman closed out 1973 with a win over Roy Buckley in the Brunswick World Open in Glendale Heights, Illinois.

Godman would never again be able to duplicate his 1973 season. He struggled on the PBA Tour through of the remainder of the decade, reaching a championship game just three times over the next six seasons, two of which came in the 1976 season. Outside the tour, Godman bowled well in the ABC Open Championships, winning both a singles and doubles title in 1974.

Godman made a bid for his second ABC Masters title in 1977, but lost in the title match to Earl Anthony.

His final tour victory came in 1980 at the PBA Quad Cities Open in Davenport, Iowa, where he climbed the ladder from the fifth seed to eventually defeat Pete Couture, 201–167, ending a seven-year title drought.

=== PBA Tour titles ===
Major championships are in bold type.

1. 1966 Western Open (San Jose, California)
2. 1967 Waukegan Open (Waukegan, Illinois)
3. 1968 Altoona Open (Altoona, Pennsylvania)
4. **1969 Firestone Tournament of Champions** (Akron, Ohio)
5. 1969 Mercury Open (St. Louis, Missouri)
6. **1971 ABC Masters*** (Detroit, Michigan)
7. 1971 Tucson Open (Tucson, Arizona)
8. 1972 Grand Rapids Open (Grand Rapids, Michigan)
9. **1973 Firestone Tournament of Champions** (Akron, Ohio)
10. 1973 Brunswick World Open (Glendale Heights, Illinois)
11. 1980 Quad Cities Open (Davenport, Iowa)
- *Retroactively added as both a PBA title and a major title in 2008.

== Later life ==
Godman, worn down by his years on the road, mostly retired from professional competition in 1981 at 35, saying, "I couldn't find any fun in it. That's all." At the time of his election to the USBC Hall of Fame, Godman was working as a bowling proprietor in Ohio and Florida.

Godman died on May 3, 2001, in Melbourne, Florida at the age of 55.

== Legacy ==
Godman was voted into the PBA Hall of Fame and ABC (now USBC) Halls of Fame in 1987.

== Awards and recognition ==
- PBA Rookie of the Year (1965)
- Two-time First Team All-American (1968–69, 1972–73)
- First bowler to win two Firestone Tournament of Champions titles (1969, 1973)
- Two ABC/USBC Open Championships (1974)
- 10 PBA Tour championships (amended to 11 when his ABC Masters victory was retroactively counted due to a 2008 rule change)
- Inducted into PBA Hall of Fame, 1987
- Inducted into ABC (now USBC) Hall of Fame, 1987
- Ranked No. 32 among the PBA's "50 Greatest Players of the Last 50 Years" poll in 2008
