= Mike Durbin =

American ten-pin bowler

Personal information
- Born: May 3, 1941 (age 85) Hollywood, California, U.S.

Bowling Information
- Affiliation: PBA
- Rookie year: 1966
- Dominant hand: Right (stroker delivery)
- Wins: 14 PBA Tour (3 majors)

Michael William Durbin (born May 3, 1941, in Hollywood, California) is an American retired professional bowler and bowling broadcaster, and is a member of both the Professional Bowlers Association (PBA) and United States Bowling Congress (USBC) Halls of Fame. Durbin won 14 PBA Tour titles in his career, including three major championships (all three in the Firestone Tournament of Champions).

== Career ==
Durbin became a member of the PBA in 1966. While living in Costa Mesa, California as a rookie in 1967, Durbin won two tournaments and was named PBA Rookie of the Year by Sporting News. He captured his fifth PBA Tour victory and first major title at the 1972 Firestone Tournament of Champions. He then went on a seven-year title drought before returning to the winner's circle at the 1979 Syracuse Open. Durbin won eight more titles in the 1980s, including his second and third Tournament of Champions majors in 1982 and 1984. His three Tournament of Champions titles established a PBA record, which has since been matched by Jason Couch (1999, 2000 and 2002) and Jason Belmonte (2014, 2015 and 2019). Durbin also finished runner-up at the 1977 Tournament of Champions and also finished fourth in 1967, third in 1970, fifth in 1980, and fourth in 1983, and had numerous achievements in other tournaments as well. He earned over $800,000 in his PBA career.

Durbin was inducted into the PBA Hall of Fame in 1984. During the 1983-84 season, Durbin served as the president of the PBA.

From the early 1980s to 1995, Durbin worked as a color analyst for ESPN alongside play-by-play man Dennis Schreiner. The two called tournaments in the summer and fall, along with senior tour events, while ABC Sports would cover the winter-spring events on the Professional Bowlers Tour, occasionally with Durbin alongside Chris Schenkel. Durbin would occasionally call the ESPN action himself with another analyst, such as Earl Anthony, if Schreiner was out on assignment. Durbin also worked as a commentator for USA Network's occasional bowling telecasts in the 1980s. In 1996, Marshall Holman became the new color analyst for ESPN's coverage, while Durbin took over play-by-play duties. Durbin retired from broadcasting in 1997. Durbin co-authored with Dan Herbst a self-help bowling book called From Gutterballs to Strikes published in 1998.

Durbin was ranked #22 on the PBA's 2008 list of "50 Greatest Players of the Last 50 Years." In late 2015, Durbin was voted into the USBC Hall of Fame, Superior Performance category, and was inducted with the 2016 class on April 28.

=== PBA Tour titles ===
Major championships are in bold text.

1. 1967 Tampa Bay-Sertoma Open (Tampa, Florida)
2. 1967 Youngstown Open (Youngstown, Ohio)
3. 1968 El Paso Open (El Paso, Texas)
4. 1970 Bellows-Valvair Open (Redwood City, California)
5. **1972 Firestone Tournament of Champions** (Akron, Ohio)
6. 1979 Syracuse Open (Syracuse, New York)
7. 1980 Northern Ohio Open (Fairview Park, Ohio)
8. 1981 Miller High Life Open (Milwaukee, Wisconsin)
9. 1981 Sarasota Open (Sarasota, Florida)
10. **1982 Firestone Tournament of Champions** (Akron, Ohio)
11. 1982 Tucson Open (Tucson, Arizona)
12. 1983 Showboat Doubles Classic w/Gil Sliker (Las Vegas, Nevada)
13. **1984 Firestone Tournament of Champions** (Akron, Ohio)
14. 1985 Quaker State Open (Grand Prairie, Texas)

== Personal ==
Durbin lived in Dayton, Ohio, in the early 1970s. A long-time resident of Chagrin Falls, Ohio, Durbin also lived in Boulder City, Nevada; Henderson, Nevada; and then in several communities in Texas, most recently Livingston. Durbin and his wife Debra have three children, Mike Jr., Matthew, and Christine (mentioned by Chris Schenkel on the 26 January 1985 ABC telecast of the Pro Bowlers Tour, 1985 Quaker State Open, wherein Durbin won his final PBA Tour title, over Mike Edwards, who failed to convert a 4-9 split in the final frame). Durbin is a Christian.

== Sources ==
- www.pba.com, official site of the Professional Bowlers Association and the Denny's PBA Tour
