= Dick Ritger =

American ten-pin bowler (1938–2020)

Personal information
- Full name: Richard A. Ritger
- Born: November 8, 1938 River Falls, Wisconsin, U.S.
- Died: August 27, 2020 (aged 81)
- Years active: 1964–1980

Bowling Information
- Affiliation: PBA
- Rookie year: 1964
- Dominant hand: Right (stroker delivery)
- Wins: 20 PBA Tour

Richard A. Ritger (November 8, 1938 – August 27, 2020) was a right-handed ten-pin bowler in the Professional Bowlers Association (PBA), who spent his later years as a bowling instructor and proprietor of Dick Ritger's Bowling Camp. Known for his smooth stroker delivery, he is one of only 17 players in history to have won at least 20 career PBA Tour titles.

== PBA career ==
Ritger grew up in River Falls, Wisconsin. He joined the PBA Tour in 1964, and won his first two PBA titles in successive weeks in 1966. He won his 20th and final PBA title in 1979. The 20 titles put him in a 14th-place tie with Wayne Webb, Amleto Monacelli and Tommy Jones on the all-time list. He won multiple titles in five different seasons on tour, including three titles each in the 1969, 1973 and 1974 seasons. Ritger also won two titles in the Classic Division at the National USBC Championships, in Team (1967) and All-Events (1977).

A gentleman on the lanes and off, Ritger won the PBA's Steve Nagy Sportsmanship award on two occasions. His status among the all-time greats was solidified with his election to the PBA Hall of Fame in 1978.

Ritger's best chance at a major title came in 1970, when he made the televised final of the Tournament of Champions and shot 268 in the final match. But he was on the wrong end of 26-time titlist Don Johnson's legendary 299 game. He also finished runner-up in the 1972 PBA National Championship and 1979 Tournament of Champions.

=== PBA Tour titles ===
1. 1966 Fort Worth Open (Fort Worth, Texas)
2. 1966 Reading Open (Reading, Pennsylvania)
3. 1967 Fresno Open (Fresno, California)
4. 1968 North Phoenix Open (Phoenix, Arizona)
5. 1968 New Orleans Lions Open (New Orleans, Louisiana)
6. 1969 Greater Buffalo Open (Buffalo, New York)
7. 1969 Japan Gold Cup (Tokyo, Japan)
8. 1969 Bellows-Valvair Open (Rochester, New York)
9. 1970 Japan Gold Cup (Tokyo, Japan)
10. 1972 Bay City Open (Bay City, Michigan)
11. 1973 Fair Lanes Open (Towson, Maryland)
12. 1973 STP Classic (Miami, Florida)
13. 1973 Canada Dry Open (Detroit, Michigan)
14. 1974 Midas Open (Alameda, California)
15. 1974 Fair Lanes Open (Towson, Maryland)
16. 1974 Star Lanes-Ebonite Open (Waukegan, Illinois)
17. 1975 Ebonite Don Carter Classic (Miami, Florida)
18. 1977 AMF Pro Classic (Garden City, New York)
19. 1978 Dutch Masters Open (North Olmsted, Ohio)
20. 1979 AMF Magicscore Open (San Antonio, Texas)

== Bowling instructor career ==
In the 1980s, Ritger started a bowling pro shop business and went into the instructional field, working as a coach for AMF and his own Dick Ritger's Bowling Camps. He became recognized as one of the most effective bowling instructors in the world, running over 500 clinics in 24 countries covering five continents.

Already a member of the USBC Hall of Fame in the Performance category, Ritger was the first person inducted into the USBC's new Bowling Coaches Hall of Fame in June 2008.

== Personal ==
Ritger began bowling regularly at age 9 in his family's 10-lane center in Hartford, Wisconsin. In his teens, he often competed in adult leagues. He graduated from the University of Wisconsin–La Crosse with a double major in Physical Education and Recreation.

=== Death ===
Ritger died in his home on August 27, 2020, at the age of 81. He is survived by Judy Ritger (his wife of 60 years), three children, 13 grandchildren and 14 great-grandchildren.

== Awards and recognition ==
- One of only 17 players in history to reach the 20-title plateau on the PBA Tour
- PBA Steve Nagy Sportsmanship award (1970, 1973)
- PBA President, 1977–78
- Inducted into PBA Hall of Fame, 1978
- Inducted into USBC Hall of Fame (Performance Category), 1984
- World Bowling Writers Distinguished Service Award, 1995
- John Martino Award for "Outstanding Contribution to the Sport of Bowling," 1998
- BPAA Dick Weber Bowling Ambassador Award, 2006 (inaugural award)
- Inducted into USBC Bowling Coaches Hall of Fame, 2008
- Was ranked #14 on the PBA's 2008 list of "50 Greatest Players of the Last 50 Years"
- Inducted into Wisconsin State USBC Hall of Fame (Skills Category), 2009

== Other sources ==
- PBA.com, official site of the Professional Bowlers Association and the Lumber Liquidator's PBA Tour
- wibowl.com, Official site of the Wisconsin State USBC Bowling Association
