= Mike McGrath (bowler) =

American bowling player

Personal information
- Nationality: American
- Born: Michael John McGrath; May 13, 1946 Berkeley, California, U.S.
- Died: July 30, 2017 (aged 71) Petaluma, California, U.S.
- Education: El Cerrito High School (El Cerrito, CA); Chico State College (Chico, CA)
- Years active: 1965-1975
- Height: 5 ft 11 in (180 cm)

Bowling Information
- Affiliation: PBA
- Rookie year: 1965
- Dominant hand: Left
- Wins: 10 PBA Tour (3 majors)

Mike McGrath (May 13, 1946 – July 30, 2017) was an American professional bowler and member of the Professional Bowlers Association. While on tour, McGrath won ten tournament titles (including three majors), was a six-time runner-up, and finished in the top-five an additional twenty-two times.

At the 1965 Portland PBA Open, McGrath became the first bowler to win a title in their first tour event.

Among McGrath's PBA major titles, he became the first bowler to win back-to-back PBA National Championships in 1969 and 1970. The 1973 U.S. Open at Madison Square Garden was the last of Mike's three major victories, where he outlasted Earl Anthony 234‐222 in the championship match.

At the 1969 Cougar Open in Paramus, New Jersey, McGrath became the first and still PBA bowler to go undefeated in a 16-game match play format.

1975 was a transition year for McGrath, bowling in his last PBA season and then becoming a long-time writer and columnist for Bowlers Journal magazine.

Mike was inducted into the PBA Hall of Fame in 1988 and the United States Bowling Congress Hall of Fame in 1993.

During the PBA's 50th season in 2008–09, McGrath was named one of the "PBA’s 50 Greatest Players of the Last 50 Years" by a panel of bowling experts commissioned by the PBA, ranking at #39, just ahead of Tom Baker and Joe Berardi (tied at #40) and behind #38 Bill Allen.

On the evening of July 30, 2017, McGrath died at his home at age 71, after a battle with cancer. McGrath was honored posthumously into the California USBC Hall of Fame in 2023 by Barry Asher.

== PBA Tour titles ==
Major championships are in bold type.

1. 1965 Portland PBA Open (Portland, OR)
2. 1968 Green Bay Open (Green Bay, WI)
3. **1969 PBA National Championship** (Long Island, NY)
4. 1970 Cougar Open (Coral Gables, FL)
5. **1970 PBA National Championship** (Garden City, NY)
6. 1972 Winston-Salem Open (Anaheim, CA)
7. 1972 Winston-Salem Invitational (Honolulu, HI)
8. **1973 BPAA U.S. Open** (New York City, NY)
9. 1973 Home Box Office Open (Pennsville, NJ)
10. 1973 Winston-Salem Invitational (Honolulu, HI)
