= Barry Asher =

American bowler (born 1946)

Personal information
- Born: July 14, 1946 (age 80) Los Angeles, California, U.S.
- Years active: 1966–1976
- Height: 6 ft 1 in (185 cm)

Bowling Information
- Affiliation: PBA
- Rookie year: 1966
- Dominant hand: Right (stroker delivery)
- Wins: 10 PBA Tour
- 300-games: 4

Barry Asher (born July 14, 1946) is an American retired professional bowler on the PBA Tour (1966–76). During his time on the tour, Asher won 10 titles along with 6 runner-up finishes, 2 of which were in the Firestone PBA Tournament of Champions in 1973 and 1975. He is a member of the PBA and USBC Halls of Fame.

== Biography ==
Barry, who is Jewish, was born in Los Angeles, California. His bowling average was 170 when he was 10 years old, 180 the next year, and over 200 at age 14. He attended Santa Ana High School and Santa Ana Junior College, and was an All-American in 1972–73. He won his first Professional Bowlers Association (PBA) title at the age of 19 in 1966.

He averaged 247 on his way to winning the 1971 South Bend (Indiana) Open, setting a new PBA scoring record. In 1976, his final year on the tour, Asher became the 15th bowler to win 10 PBA titles. He also won four titles in the American Bowling Congress (ABC) national tournament. He was named Senior Bowler of the Year three times.

He was the bowling technical advisor for the film The Big Lebowski (1998) and bowled in the final scene.

In 2008, the PBA announced the 50 Greatest Players in association's history, Asher was one of the 50.

Today, Asher is owner and operator of Champions Bowling & Embroidery, located inside of Fountain Bowl in Fountain Valley, CA.

== PBA career ==
=== PBA Tour titles ===
Major championships are in bold type.

1. 1966 Southern California Open (Encino, California)
2. 1966 Crescent City Open (New Orleans, Louisiana)
3. 1971 South Bend Open (South Bend, Indiana)
4. 1971 850,000 American Airlines Open (Ellisville, Missouri)
5. 1972 Columbia 300 Open (Cranston, Rhode Island)
6. 1972 Japan Gold Cup (Tokyo, Japan)
7. 1973 Showboat Invitational (Las Vegas, Nevada)
8. 1973 Home Box Office Open (Tucson, Arizona)
9. 1975 ARC Alameda Open (Alameda, California)
10. 1976 Tucson HBO Open (Tucson, Arizona)

== Halls of Fame ==
Asher was inducted into the USBC Hall of Fame in 1998, Asher was inducted into the PBA Hall of Fame in 1988, and into the Orange County Bowling Hall of Fame and the Southern California Bowling Hall of Fame. He is also a member of the Jewish Sports Hall of Fame (1990) and the Southern California Jewish Sports Hall of Fame (2000).

== See also ==
- List of select Jewish bowlers
