= 2009–10 PBA Tour season =

PBA Bowling Tour: 2009–10 Season
- League: Professional Bowlers Association
- Sport: Ten-pin bowling
- Duration: August 2, 2009 – April 25, 2010

PBA Tour
- Season MVP: Walter Ray Williams, Jr.

PBA Tour seasons
- ← 2008–09 2010–11 →

This is a recap of the 2009–10 season for the Professional Bowlers Association (PBA) tour. It was the Tour's 51st season and consisted of 19 title events.

== Tournament schedule and recaps ==
In a cost-cutting move, the PBA held the first half of the 2009–10 season in Allen Park, Michigan (just outside Detroit) under the name "PBA World Series of Bowling". Preliminary rounds of the televised tournaments were held in August, with television tapings on Labor Day weekend (September 5–7). Qualifying for the first of the PBA's four majors, the PBA World Championship, was part of the World Series. The television finals for this event took place live in Wichita, Kansas, three months after the preliminary rounds.

With one exception, the singles events of the 2009 PBA Women's Series were all contested at the World Series.

The second half of the season followed a traditional touring format, and included a total of 14 telecasts (11 title events and 3 special non-title events). The three remaining major tournaments (PBA Tournament of Champions, USBC Masters and 67th U.S. Open) were all contested in the second half. The 2010 Japan Cup, contested April 22–25, was also a PBA title event. The final eight for this tournament competed live on Japanese television, but no U.S. TV broadcast was aired.

=== World Series of Bowling (first-half) highlights ===
- Walter Ray Williams Jr. added to his incredible streak of consecutive seasons winning at least one tournament, as he captured the Motor City Open for his PBA-best 46th title overall. Williams, who turned 50 in October, has now won a PBA tournament in 17 straight seasons.
- Norm Duke took sole possession of 5th place on the PBA's all-time titles list, picking up his 33rd win in the Cheetah Championship.
- Bill O'Neill, a non-winner on tour despite seven TV Finals appearances in 2008–09, earned his first-ever PBA title in the Chameleon Championship.
- 46-year-old tour veteran Jack Jurek set a record for the longest drought between PBA titles when he captured his second tour win in the Shark Championship. Jurek's lone previous title had come 14 years, 175 days prior, when he won the 1995 Tums Classic. It took a sudden-death rolloff for Jurek to earn title #2, after he and Mike Fagan had tied 218–218 to end the regulation game.
- In the feel-good story of the half, rookie Tom Smallwood made the TV finals in two World Series of Bowling events, winning his first title and first major at the PBA World Championship on December 13. He defeated reigning PBA Player of the Year Wes Malott, 244–228, in the final match. Smallwood attended the PBA Tour Trials in May, 2009, only because he had been laid off from his auto plant job in December, 2008. The Saginaw, Michigan resident finished in the Top 8 at the Tour Trials to earn a PBA Tour exemption.
- Kelly Kulick, who did not qualify for the PBA Women's Series in 2008–09, picked up two Women's Series titles—including the inaugural PBA Women's World Championship. The major championship rewarded her with a spot in the 2010 PBA Tournament of Champions, where she was the first-ever female competitor in the event.
- Shannon Pluhowsky also won two Women's Series tournaments, giving her three total victories in the series.

=== Second-half highlights ===
- The half featured four first-time PBA Tour winners: Kelly Kulick, Anthony Lacaze, Brian Kretzer and Brian Ziesig. Kulick's momentous victory in the January 24 Tournament of Champions finals over Chris Barnes, 265–195, made her the first female bowler ever to win a regular PBA Tour event. In addition, Mike Fagan won his first career singles title.
- 50-year-old Walter Ray Williams Jr. won his eighth career major, and 47th title overall, at the USBC Masters. He also picked up his seventh career PBA Player of the Year award.
- The final major of the year, the 67th U.S. Open, was won by Bill O'Neill over defending champ Mike Scroggins.
- Pete Weber ended a three-year title drought with his 35th career win at the season-ending Lumber Liquidators Marathon Open, denying top seed Mike Scroggins a Player of the Year award in the process.

=== Awards ===
The following awards were given:

- Chris Schenkel Player of the Year: Walter Ray Williams, Jr.
- Harry Smith PBA Points Leader Award: Walter Ray Williams, Jr. (229,124)
- George Young High Average Award: Walter Ray Williams, Jr. (222.89)
- Tour Earnings Leader: Walter Ray Williams, Jr. ($152,670)
- Steve Nagy Sportsmanship Award: George Lambert IV

=== Tournaments ===
Below is a summary of the 2009–10 season. Career titles for tournament winners are shown in parentheses. (Titles shown for women are for PBA Women's Series events only.)

Event	ESPN airdate	City	Preliminary rounds	Final round	Oil pattern	Winner	Notes
PBA Women's World Championship	Oct 25	Allen Park, MI	Aug 31 – Sep 4	Sep 6		Kelly Kulick (1)	First women's World Championship under PBA sanction.
PBA Senior World Championship	Oct 25	Allen Park, MI	Aug 31 – Sep 4	Sep 6		Harry Sullins	
Motor City Open	Nov 1	Allen Park, MI	Aug 2–6 (Taylor, MI)	Sep 5		Walter Ray Williams, Jr. (46)	Non-exempt (open) event.
Cheetah Championship	Nov 8	Allen Park, MI	Aug 11–12	Aug 13	Cheetah	Norm Duke (33)	Exempt event. Match-play format (best 4-of-7 through final head-to-head match).
Viper Championship	Nov 15	Allen Park, MI	Aug 14–16	Sep 5	Viper	Men's: Rhino Page (3); Women's: Liz Johnson (2)	Exempt event. Women's Series event.
Chameleon Championship	Nov 22	Allen Park, MI	Aug 18–20	Sep 6	Chameleon	Men's: Bill O'Neill (1); Women's: Shannon Pluhowsky (2)	Exempt event. Women's Series event.
Scorpion Championship	Nov 29	Allen Park, MI	Aug 23–25	Sep 6	Scorpion	Men's: Mike Devaney (2); Women's: Shannon Pluhowsky (3)	Exempt event. Women's Series event.
Shark Championship	Dec 6	Allen Park, MI	Aug 27–29	Sep 6	Shark	Men's: Jack Jurek (2); Women's: Kelly Kulick (2)	Exempt event. Women's Series event.
PBA World Championship	Dec 13	Wichita, KS	Aug 30 – Sep (Allen Park, MI)	Live		Tom Smallwood (1)	Non-exempt (open) event. First major of the season.
Holiday break
Pepsi Red, White and Blue Open	Jan 10	Wichita, KS	Dec 7–12	Dec 13	Red, White, Blue	Mike Scroggins (7)	Non-exempt (open) event.
Earl Anthony Memorial	Jan 17	Dublin, CA	Jan 12–16	Live	Earl Anthony	Men's: Anthony Lacaze (1); Women's: Stefanie Nation (2)	Exempt event. Women's Series event.
PBA Tournament of Champions	Jan 24	Las Vegas, NV	Jan 19–23	Live	T of C	Kelly Kulick (1)	Invitational event. Second major of the season.
One-A-Day Dick Weber Open	Jan 31	Fountain Valley, CA	Jan 26–30	Live	Dick Weber	Mike Fagan (2)	Non-exempt (open) event.
Chris Paul PBA Celebrity Invitational	Feb 7	Kenner, LA	Sep 25	Sep 25	Cheetah	Chris Paul and Jason Belmonte	Invitational event (non-title event).
USBC Masters	Feb 14	Reno, NV	Feb 9–13	Live	Masters	Walter Ray Williams, Jr. (47)	Open event administered by the PBA for the USBC. Third major of the season.
Bayer Don & Paula Carter Mixed Doubles	Feb 21	Wheat Ridge, CO	Feb 16–20	Live	Scorpion	Brian Voss (25) and Diandra Asbaty (2)	Mixed PBA and PBA Women's Series event.
Lumber Liquidators 67th U.S. Open	Feb 28	Indianapolis, IN	Feb 22–27	Live		Bill O'Neill (2)	Non-exempt (open) event. Fourth major of the season.
Etonic Don Johnson Eliminator	Mar 7	Columbus, OH	Mar 2–6	Live	Chameleon	Mike Scroggins (8)	Exempt event.
Go RVing Match Play Championship	Mar 21	Norwich, CT	Mar 17–20	Live	Shark/Cheetah	Brian Kretzer (1)	Exempt event.
Geico Mark Roth Plastic Ball Championship	Mar 28	West Babylon, NY	Mar 24–27	Live	Shark, 1/3 volume	Brian Ziesig (amateur) (1)	Exempt event. Bowlers must bowl with PBA-supplied plastic bowling balls.
Lumber Liquidators Marathon Open	Apr 4	Baltimore, MD	Mar 29 – Apr 3	Live	Multiple patterns	Pete Weber (35)	Non-exempt (open) event. Players bowl on 7 patterns during qualifying. Top seed chooses pattern for TV finals (Dick Weber).
PBA Experience Showdown	Apr 11	Arlington, TX	Apr 6–8	Apr 8		Rhino Page	Postseason special (non-title) event for five winners of the PBA oil-pattern championships, plus one amateur qualifier from a PBA Experience league.
PBA Women's Series Showdown	Apr 18	Arlington, TX	Apr 6–8	Apr 8		Michelle Feldman	Postseason special event for winners of the Women's Series championships.
Japan Cup 2010		Tokyo, Japan	Apr 22–25			Tommy Jones (13)	Annual combination event with Japan PBA.

=== PBA Xtra Frame League ===
During the touring schedule (January – April 2010), 32 exempt bowlers competed in a traveling singles league. All matches were taped for airing on the PBA's Xtra Frame pay-per-view web video service.

=== 2009-10 PBA Tour Trials ===
The PBA Tour Trials, which determined the eight additional exempt bowlers for the upcoming season, concluded May 31, 2009 in Allen Park, Michigan. The trials consisted of 45 games bowled over nine days on various PBA oil patterns. The eight qualifiers include:

- Joe Ciccone
- George Lambert IV
- Tom Smallwood
- Cassidy Schaub
- Mitch Beasley
- Stuart Williams
- Stevie Weber
- Tim Mack

Both Ciccone and Beasley regained exemptions they had lost by not earning enough points during the 2008–09 season. Schaub is now the second two-handed bowler (joining Jason Belmonte) to earn a PBA Tour exemption. Williams becomes the first British ten-pin bowler ever to bowl full-time on the PBA Tour.
