= 2008–09 PBA Tour season =

PBA Bowling Tour: 2008–09 Season
- League: Professional Bowlers Association
- Sport: Ten-pin bowling
- Duration: October 19, 2008 – April 26, 2009

PBA Tour
- Season MVP: Wes Malott

PBA Tour seasons
- ← 2007–08 2009–10 →

This is a recap of the 2008–09 season for the Professional Bowlers Association (PBA) Tour. It was the Tour's 50th season and consisted of 21 events.

== Season highlights ==
On October 1, 2008, the PBA began a three-year sponsorship deal with Lumber Liquidators, making the American hardwood flooring retailer the tour's title sponsor through the 2010–11 season. Denny's, the title sponsor from 2005 to 2008, remained a PBA sponsor and continued as the title sponsor of the Denny's Dick Weber Open tour stop.

The PBA kicked off its 50th season with a major tournament: the PBA World Championship was moved to the front of the PBA schedule for the first time in history. The tournament was contested October 19–25, 2008 at Northrock Lanes in Wichita, Kansas, with the live televised finals airing Sunday, October 26 on ESPN. The 20-event 2008–09 season concluded with the 66th U.S. Open, March 29 – April 5 in North Brunswick, New Jersey. Other majors in 2008–09 included the H&R Block Tournament of Champions (January 19–26 at Red Rock Lanes in Las Vegas, Nevada) and USBC Masters (February 8–16 at the Cashman Center in Las Vegas).

The Dydo Japan Cup, which typically kicks off the PBA Tour season on ESPN, was delayed until late April, 2009, due to arena issues.

A special "Golden Anniversary Championship" featured 16 Senior PBA bowlers (age 50 or older) who earned entry through a dedicated qualifying round at the Hammond, Indiana tour stop. The eventual top two Senior bowlers squared off in a live televised final, airing after the final match for the regular touring pros on November 9.

The PBA Women's Series, which began on a limited basis in the 2007–08 season, continued this season with seven events (see article: PBA Women's Series). The series featured head-to-head women's matches airing jointly with six PBA telecasts, plus a mixed doubles event with PBA professionals that aired February 1, 2009.

=== First-half highlights ===
- Norm Duke won the season-opening PBA World Championship in Wichita, Kansas. The major title earned Duke the distinction of being the only PBA bowler in history to win three consecutive majors. (He won the Denny's PBA World Championship and the 65th U.S. Open at the end of the 2007–08 season.)
- Walter Ray Williams Jr. extended his all-time titles lead, winning his 45th at the Lake County Indiana Golden Anniversary Championship. The victory extended his streak of seasons winning at least one title to 16, also a PBA record.
- Brad Angelo, thought by many to be the best bowler on tour without a title, ended six years of frustration with his first title at the Pepsi Viper Championship. He had been in 13 previous TV finals without winning.
- Wes Malott made the TV finals in four of the first eight events, but came away with only one title (Carmen Salvino Scorpion Championship).

=== Second-half highlights ===
- Wes Malott continued his dominance in the second half, making four more TV finals (eight total in 2008-09), and picking up his second and third titles of the season (Bayer Earl Anthony Medford Classic and Etonic Marathon Open).
- Patrick Allen made the TV finals in the first three singles events of the half, winning titles in two of the appearances. The second title was a major at the Tournament of Champions, where he defeated friend and Tour roommate Rhino Page in the final match, 267–263. The victory also snapped Norm Duke's string of three consecutive major titles.
- In the first PBA mixed doubles tournament since 1998, Liz Johnson and Norm Duke defeated Jennifer Petrick and Steve Harman, 274–180, to claim the title in the Don and Paula Carter Mixed Doubles Championship.
- John Nolen, winner of the Regional Players Invitational (RPI) tournament in December, 2008, but otherwise a relative unknown, won the third major of the season at the USBC Masters.
- 2007–08 Player of the Year Chris Barnes won back-to-back titles for the first time in his career, capturing both the Don Johnson Buckeye State Eliminator Championship and the Go RVing Match Play Championship.
- Mike Scroggins won his second career major title at the season-ending Lumber Liquidators 66th U.S. Open, defeating top seed Norm Duke in the final. Duke was aiming to become just the fifth bowler in history to repeat as U.S. Open champion, and would have surpassed Wes Malott in Player of the Year points had he won.

== Awards and Leaders ==
- Player Of The Year: Wes Malott
- Rookie Of The Year: Jason Belmonte
- High Average Award: Wes Malott (222.98)
- Money Leader: Norm Duke ($199,630)
- Steve Nagy Sportsmanship Award: Ryan Shafer

== Tournament schedule and recap ==
Majors are noted in bold text. The number of titles for tournament winners is noted in parentheses. The women's title count is for PBA Women's Series events only.

| Dates | Event | City | Oil pattern | Swing | Winner | Notes / Concurrent event |
|---|---|---|---|---|---|---|
| Sep 20 | Chris Paul Celebrity Invitational | Winston-Salem, NC | Scorpion | n/a | Jason Couch and LeBron James | Exhibition event - 5 NBA and 5 PBA players in Baker doubles airdate Oct 19 |
| Oct 19–26 | **PBA World Championship** | Wichita, KS | World Championship | Grand Slam | Norm Duke (29) | First time held at start of season (open event) |
| Oct 29 – Nov 2 | Pepsi Viper Championship | Omaha, NE | Viper | Versatility | Men's: Brad Angelo (1); Women's: Stefanie Nation (1) | Women's Series |
| Nov 4–9 | Lake County Indiana Golden Anniversary Championship | Hammond, IN | Dick Weber | n/a | Walter Ray Williams, Jr. (45); PBA Senior: Timothy Kauble | Senior Division Golden Anniversary Championship |
| Nov 9–11 | Ultimate Scoring Championship | Taylor, MI | | Extreme | Mike Wolfe (4) | Bowling on standard house conditions to demonstrate its scoring potential airdate Nov 23 |
| Nov 12–16 | Chameleon Championship | Taylor, MI | Chameleon | Versatility | Men's: Mike Machuga (2); Women's: Michelle Feldman (1) | Women's Series |
| Nov 26–30 | CLR Carmen Salvino Scorpion Championship | Vernon Hills, IL | Scorpion | Versatility | Men's: Wes Malott (4); Women's: Michelle Feldman (2) | Women's Series |
| Dec 3–7 | Cheetah Championship | Cheektowaga, NY | Cheetah | Versatility | Men's: Parker Bohn III (32); Women's: Carolyn Dorin-Ballard (2) | Women's Series |
| Dec 10–14 | Lumber Liquidators Shark Championship | Baltimore, MD | Shark | Versatility | Men's: Rhino Page (2); Women's: Jodi Woessner (1) | Women's Series |
Holiday break
| Jan 4–6 | Don and Paula Carter Mixed Doubles Championship | Reno, NV | Shark | n/a | Norm Duke (30) and Liz Johnson (1) | Companion event with Women's Series airdate Feb 1 |
| Jan 7–11 | National Bowling Stadium Championship | Reno, NV | Cheetah/Shark | n/a | Patrick Allen (11) | |
| Jan 14–18 | Bayer Earl Anthony Medford Classic | Medford, OR | Earl | Versatility | Men's: Wes Malott (5); Women's: Wendy Macpherson (1) | Debut of "Earl" pattern; Women's Series |
| Jan 21–25 | **H&R Block Tournament of Champions** | Las Vegas, NV | T of C | Grand Slam | Patrick Allen (12) | Invitational event |
| Feb 3–8 | Denny's Dick Weber Open | Fountain Valley, CA | Dick Weber | n/a | Norm Duke (31) | Open event |
| Feb 10–15 | **USBC Masters** | Las Vegas, NV | Masters | Grand Slam | John Nolen (1) | Open event |
| Feb 18–22 | GEICO Plastic Ball Championship | Wheat Ridge, CO | Cheetah | Extreme | Jeff Carter (1) | PBA assigns two plastic balls to each player to equalize competition |
| Feb 25 – Mar 1 | Etonic Marathon Championship | Indianapolis, IN | All Tour patterns | Extreme | Wes Malott (6) | Open event; 54 games in 5 days including two 18-game days; different oil pattern each day; top qualifier chooses pattern for finals |
| Mar 2–8 | Don Johnson Buckeye State Eliminator Championship | Columbus, OH | Viper/Scorpion | Extreme | Chris Barnes (11) | Semifinals and TV use Eliminator format |
| Mar 18–22 | Go RVing Match Play Championship | Norwich, CT | Chameleon/Cheetah | Extreme | Chris Barnes (12) | 64-bowler match play event seeded by Tour Points |
| Mar 25–29 | The Bowling Foundation Long Island Classic | West Babylon, NY | Viper/Shark | n/a | Jason Belmonte (1) | Winner can earn a bonus for also winning the U.S. Open |
| Mar 29 – Apr 5 | **Lunber LIquidators 66th U.S. Open** | North Brunswick, NJ | U.S. Open | Grand Slam | Mike Scroggins (6) | Open field |
| Apr 23–26 | Dydo Japan Cup | Tokyo, Japan | Custom | n/a | Patrick Allen (13) | Field included Japanese, Korean and American bowlers aired on PBA.com Xtra Frame only |

== Exemptions for 2008–09 ==
The following is a breakdown of the 58 bowlers who received a PBA exemption for most tournaments in the 2008–09 season:

- 40 – Current Lumber Liquidators PBA Tour (previous season champions and 2007–08 point leaders among non-champions)
- 6 – Point leaders from PBA regions
- 7 – 2008 Lake County Indiana Lumber Liquidators PBA Tour Trials
- 1 – Non-exempt Points Leader from the 2007–08 Denny's PBA Tour (+)
- 4 – Deferred Exemptions from the 2007–08 Denny's PBA Tour

(+) Rhino Page topped all non-exempt bowlers during the 2007–08 season. But because Page also won a title, this exemption went to the next-highest non-exempt bowler, Edward VanDaniker Jr.

This leaves six spots that can be earned each week through the Lumber Liquidators PBA Tour Qualifying Round (TQR), for a total starting field of 64 bowlers. If a bowler from any of the aforementioned categories does not take his or her spot in a given week, the next-place bowler beyond 6th place in the TQR will take the spot.

There are some exceptions to this breakdown. The PBA World Championship, Dick Weber Open and PBA Marathon Championship events are open to the entire PBA membership in 2008–09. The U.S. Open and USBC Masters events are open to the entire PBA membership plus qualifying USBC amateurs.

=== Newly-exempt bowlers for 2008–09 ===
The following six bowlers received 2008–09 tour exemptions by finishing with the most points in their respective PBA Regions (the East Region points leader declined his exemption). This is the last year that points alone will qualify a Regional bowler for an exemption (see main article, Professional Bowlers Association).

- Ken Abner (Central Region)
- Nathan Bohr (Southwest Region)
- Andrew Cain (West Region)
- Chester Rogers Jr. (Northwest Region)
- Jason Sterner (South Region)
- David Traber (Midwest Region)

In late May 2008, the PBA held the 2008 Lumber Liquidators PBA Tour Trials to determine the final seven bowlers who would attain exempt status for the 2008–09 season. At the Tour Trials, six-time PBA titlist Dave D'Entremont led the field with a 45-game pinfall of 10,051 (223.4 average) to regain the tour exemption he lost following the 2007–08 season. Below are the seven bowlers with the largest pin totals, who received exempt status for the 2008–09 season:

- Dave D'Entremont
- Craig Tuholski
- Chad Kloss
- Joe Bailey
- Jason Lundquist
- Randy Weiss
- Terrance Reeves

== 2008–09 Finals formats ==
The 2008–09 season used a combination of bracketed and stepladder finals, plus some newly introduced finals formats. The four-player bracketed format was used four times during the season, a four-player stepladder format was used nine times, and a five-player stepladder format was used five times. In addition:

- The Don Johnson Buckeye State Classic (March 8) featured an "Eliminator" format. In the opening match, the top four bowlers from match play competed with the low bowler being eliminated. In the next match, the low bowler was again eliminated from the remaining three. The final match was standard: two bowlers faced each other, with the winner crowned champion.
- Inspired by NCAA Basketball's "March Madness," the PBA Match Play Championship (March 22) started by ranking the Top 64 bowlers in points through this point of the season. The first round paired the 1st-ranked bowler against the 64th-ranked, 2nd-ranked versus 63rd-ranked, and so on in single-game match play to cut the field to 32. Using the same seedings, the field was cut from 32 to 16, from 16 to 8, from 8 to 4, and from 4 to 2. Only two bowlers remained for the televised final. These two bowled three games each, with total pinfall deciding the champion.
