= 2007–08 PBA Tour season =

PBA Bowling Tour: 2007–08 Season
- League: Professional Bowlers Association
- Sport: Ten-pin bowling
- Duration: September 23, 2007 – March 30, 2008

PBA Tour
- Season MVP: Chris Barnes

PBA Tour seasons
- ← 2006–07 2008–09 →

This is the 2007–08 season in review for the Professional Bowlers Association (PBA). It was the Tour's 49th season and consisted of 21 events.

== Season highlights ==
- Chris Barnes made the final match in four tournaments, winning two titles en route to PBA Player of the Year honors. This marked the first PBA season that a points system (not a player vote) determined Player of the Year.
- Sean Rash became the second bowler (Hugh Miller was the other) to win titles in his first four televised appearances, as he captured his first major title at the USBC Masters in November.
- Walter Ray Williams, Jr. won two titles early in the season, raising his all-time PBA leading total to 44. This gave Williams a title in 15 straight seasons, tying Earl Anthony's 1970–84 streak. Williams also led the tour in average, setting the second-highest season mark in history at 228.34.
- Norm Duke completed a stunning comeback from an injury-marred first half (which put him in danger of losing his tour exemption) to win the last two majors of the season (PBA World Championship and 65th U.S. Open).
- Rookie Rhino Page set a record by making five televised finals while starting from the Tour Qualifying Round (TQR). He won his first PBA title in the Go RVing Classic – his fifth trip to the finals.
- Michael Haugen Jr. overcame a 53-pin sixth-frame deficit against Chris Barnes to win the H&R Block Tournament of Champions.
- Rob Stone took over play-by-play duties from Dave Ryan on ESPN broadcasts of the PBA Tour. 13-time PBA titleist Randy Pedersen continued as the on-air analyst.

== Awards and leaders ==
- Player Of The Year: Chris Barnes
- Rookie Of The Year: Rhino Page
- High Average Award: Walter Ray Williams, Jr. (228.34)
- Money Leader: Norm Duke ($176,855)

== Tournament results ==
- Majors are noted in **boldface**.

Date	Event	City	Oil pattern	Winner (title #)	Runner-up	Score
Sep 23	Dydo Japan Cup	Tokyo, Japan	Standard	Mika Koivuniemi (8)	Mike Wolfe	200–178
Oct 28	**USBC Masters**	Milwaukee, WI	Standard	Sean Rash (4)	Steve Jaros	269–245
Nov 4	Motor City Classic	Taylor, MI	Viper	Walter Ray Williams Jr. (43)	Eugene McCune	214–194
Nov 11	Etonic Championship	Cheektowaga, NY	Scorpion	Mike Wolfe (3)	Walter Ray Williams Jr.	256–225
Nov 18	Lake County Indiana Classic	Merrillville, IN	Chameleon	Michael Haugen Jr. (1)	Wes Malott	247–239
Nov 25	CLR Windy City Classic	Vernon Hills, IL	Shark	Robert Smith (7)	Brad Angelo	223–205
Dec 2	Great Lakes Classic	Wyoming, MI	Cheetah	Walter Ray Williams, Jr. (44)	Chris Loschetter	276–204
Dec 9	Lumber Liquidators Championship	Baltimore, MD	Scorpion	Patrick Allen (10)	Wes Malott	247–217
Dec 16	Spartanburg Classic	Spartanburg, SC	Viper	Parker Bohn III (31)	Rhino Page	267–257
Jan 6	ConstructionJobs.com Classic	Reno, NV	Shark	Tommy Jones (11)	Patrick Allen	254–214
Jan 13	Earl Anthony Medford Classic	Medford, OR	Cheetah	Wes Malott (3)	Rhino Page	255–193
Jan 20	Motel 6 Dick Weber Open	Fountain Valley, CA	Standard	Mike Scroggins (4)	Chris Barnes	226–171
Jan 27	**H&R Block Tournament of Champions**	Las Vegas, NV	T of C	Michael Haugen Jr. (2)	Chris Barnes	215-214
Feb 3	PBA Exempt Doubles Classic	Las Vegas, NV	T of C	Danny Wiseman (12) and Mike Fagan (1)	Joe Ciccone and Ronnie Russell	210–208
Feb 10	Bayer Classic	El Paso, TX	Shark	Chris Barnes (9)	Tommy Jones	241–158
Feb 17	Pepsi Championship	Elkhorn, NE	Scorpion	Mike Scroggins (5)	Walter Ray Williams Jr.	214–194
Feb 24	**Denny's World Championship**	Indianapolis, IN	World Championship	Norm Duke (27)	Ryan Shafer	202–165
Mar 2	Don Johnson Buckeye St. Classic	Columbus, OH	Viper	Chris Barnes (10)	Ken Simard	209–197
Mar 9	Go RVing Classic	Norwich, CT	Chameleon	Rhino Page (1)	Jack Jurek	244–220
Mar 23	GEICO Classic	West Babylon, NY	Cheetah	Tommy Jones (12)	Pete Weber	257–191
Mar 30	**65th U.S. Open**	North Brunswick, NJ	U.S. Open	Norm Duke (28)	Mika Koivuniemi	224–216

Marking the end of the 2007–08 PBA season on ESPN, the fourth annual Motel 6 Roll To Riches was contested on April 13, 2008 in Orlando. In a unique format, six bowlers (Doug Kent, Sean Rash, Michael Haugen Jr., Norm Duke, Parker Bohn III and Chris Barnes) battled for a $150,000 winner-take-all prize. Parker Bohn III won the final "race to six strikes" against Norm Duke to take home the prize. (Earnings in this event do not count toward PBA career totals.)
