= Bill O'Neill (bowler) =

American professional ten-pin bowler

Personal information
- Born: October 21, 1981 (age 44)
- Years active: 2001–present

Bowling Information
- Affiliation: PBA
- Rookie year: 2005
- Dominant hand: Right (cranker delivery)
- Wins: 15 PBA Tour (3 majors) 10 PBA Regional Tour 2 WTBA
- 300-games: 30
- Sponsors: Hammer Bowling, Dexter shoes, Vise Grips

William O'Neill (born October 21, 1981) is a right-handed professional ten-pin bowler who competes on the PBA Tour in North America. A resident of Langhorne, Pennsylvania, his nickname on tour is "The Real Deal". O'Neill has won 15 PBA Tour titles, including three major championships. He won the 2009–10 U.S. Open, and has won the PBA Players Championship twice (2020 and 2024). He has finished runner-up in two other major championships.

On January 31, 2025, O'Neill was elected to the PBA Hall of Fame in his first year of eligibility. He was officially inducted with the 2025 class in April.

O'Neill has also bowled internationally as a member of Team USA. He was the first person to be a two time World Champion after winning the WTBA singles titles (gold medals) in 2010 and 2013.

Bill is a pro staff member for Hammer Bowling, Dexter shoes and Vise Grips.

== Amateur career ==
O'Neill bowled collegiately for Saginaw Valley State University where he was a member of Sigma Pi fraternity. He earned first-team All American honors all four years he competed. He was named Bowling Writers Association of America's Collegiate Bowler of the Year in 2001, 2003 and 2004. He was also honored as the Most Valuable Player by the National Collegiate Bowling Coaches Association in 2003 and 2004.

In the 2020 Weber Cup, O'Neill and his Team USA teammates defeated Team Europe, 23–18. Overall in the event, O'Neill participated in 12 of 41 matches, going 3–2 in singles, 3–2 in doubles, and 1–1 in team.

== PBA career ==
O'Neill was named PBA Rookie of the Year in his first full PBA season (2005–06), after making match play 11 times in 18 tournaments and appearing once in the TV finals.

Despite not winning a tournament, O'Neill had an excellent season in 2008–09. He qualified for match play in a career-high 18 of 20 tournaments, made it to the championship round seven times (a career high until being matched in 2019), and narrowly missed winning the PBA's George Young High Average Award (222.96 to Wes Malott's 222.98).

After 83 tournaments and 11 previous finals appearances without winning, O'Neill finally earned his elusive first PBA Tour title in the PBA Chameleon Championship on September 6, 2009, defeating Ronnie Russell in the final match. That same season, O'Neill earned his second PBA Tour title and first major title at the 2009-10 67th Lumber Liquidators U.S. Open. After qualifying as the #2 seed, he defeated Tommy Jones in the semifinal match. He started slowly in the championship match against #1 seed and defending champ Mike Scroggins, converting a spare then leaving an open frame. However, he then rolled the final 10 strikes of the game, for a runaway 267–207 victory.

Bill won a then-career high $147,275 in the 2009–10 season. He finished the season tied with Walter Ray Williams, Jr. and Mike Scroggins in PBA Player of the Year points, but the honor went to Williams in an overall competition points tie-breaker.

At the 2010 PBA World Series of Bowling, Bill won the Pepsi Viper Championship for his third PBA Tour title. O'Neill also had the highest 60-game qualifying scores among all bowlers at the World Series. This earned him the #1 seed for the 2010–11 PBA World Championship, which took place January 14–16, 2011. However, he was defeated in the title match by Chris Barnes.

He won the Alka Seltzer Plus Cold Cheetah Championship on November 10, 2012, beating Mike Wolfe for his fourth PBA Tour title. He then went without a title for all of calendar year 2013.

During the PBA's Summer Swing in 2014, O'Neill defeated Brian Valenta in the Lucas Oil PBA Badger Open to receive his fifth PBA title. O'Neill also won the special "King of the Swing" challenge at this event for an additional $10,000, though this was a non-title match.

At the 2015 Summer Swing, O'Neill qualified as the #1 seed in the PBA Oklahoma Open, and defeated Jason Belmonte in his lone match to win his sixth PBA title. O'Neill repeated his 2014 win in the King of the Swing (non-title) challenge event to earn an additional $10,000. Bill also finished third in two other Summer Swing events, taking home a total of $36,000 during the five-event series. On August 2, 2015, Bill won his seventh PBA title in the Striking Against Breast Cancer Mixed Doubles championship, teaming with PWBA player Shannon O'Keefe to take the top prize. This marked his first season since 2009–10 in which he had multiple titles.

In 2016, O'Neill and O'Keefe repeated as champions at the Striking Against Breast Cancer Mixed Doubles championship, giving O'Neill his eighth PBA title.

O'Neill collected his ninth PBA title on February 25, 2018, winning the Roth/Holman PBA Doubles Championship with partner Jason Belmonte.

On January 6, 2019, O'Neill won his tenth PBA title (and first singles title since 2015) at the season-opening PBA Hall of Fame Classic. At World Series of Bowling X in March, he had top ten finishes in all four events and made two televised finals, but he didn't win a title. O'Neill qualified as the #7 seed for the inaugural PBA Tour Playoffs. He made it all the way to the June 2 finals in this event, but lost to Kristopher Prather. O'Neil cashed $40,000 for his runner-up finish, and surpassed the $1,000,000 mark in career earnings during the 2019 season. On August 11, O'Neill won his 11th PBA Tour title at the PBA Harry O'Neale Chesapeake Open. Having qualified as the top seed, he defeated A.J. Chapman in the championship finals for his second title of the 2019 season. O'Neill also won the $25,000 first prize in the FloBowling PBA ATX invite on September 21, 2019. This was a non-title elimination event featuring the top eight points-earners over the nine FloBowling PBA Summer Swing tournaments. Overall in 2019, O'Neill established career highs in cashes (21) and earnings ($185,148), and tied his career high with seven championship-round appearances.

O'Neill qualified as the #1 seed for the 2020 PBA Tournament of Champions, but lost the championship match to Kristopher Prather. Six days later, on February 15, O'Neill won his twelfth PBA Tour title and second major at the 2020 PBA Players Championship in Columbus, Ohio. He qualified as the #3 seed for the stepladder finals, beating Kris Prather and Jason Belmonte in matches #2 and #3, and defeating E. J. Tackett in the championship match by one pin, 233–232. Based on 2020 points, O'Neill qualified as the #2 seed for the season-ending PBA Tour Playoffs, earning a bye into the Round of 16. On his way through the brackets, he defeated AJ Johnson, Kyle Troup and Tom Smallwood in single-game matches. He then defeated Anthony Simonsen in the double-elimination final match, 235–203 and 249–195. O'Neill was rewarded with his 13th PBA Tour title and the $100,000 first prize. On December 18, 2020, the PBA announced that O'Neill had finished runner-up to Jason Belmonte for 2020 PBA Player of the Year. Despite the 2020 season being shortened by COVID-19, O'Neill cashed a career-high $272,285.

After a three-year title drought, O'Neill won his 14th PBA Tour title and third major championship at the 2024 PBA Players Championship. Qualifying as the #2 seed, O'Neill knocked off Ryan Barnes in the semifinal match before defeating top seed Tom Smallwood in the championship match, 209–178. For the 2024 season, O'Neill finished fourth in Tour points and cashed $198,540.

On February 1, 2025, during an FS1 telecast of the U.S. Open play-in round, O'Neill was being interviewed by Rob Stone and Randy Pedersen to honor the 15th anniversary of his U.S. Open win in 2010. PBA Commissioner Tom Clark then approached the broadcast booth to surprise O'Neill with the announcement that he had been elected to the PBA Hall of Fame in his first year of eligibility. On February 8, 2025 (broadcast March 2 on FS1), O'Neill and partner Jason Belmonte won their second Roth/Holman PBA Doubles Championship, the last one coming in 2018.

O'Neill ranked #10 on the PBA's 2025 "Best 25 PBA Players of the Last 25 Seasons" list. The ranking was based on a points system that took into account standard titles, major titles, top-five finishes and Player of the Year awards.

Through 2019, O'Neill had recorded 30 perfect 300 games in PBA competition. He also has 10 PBA Regional titles.

== Professional wins ==
=== PBA Tour wins (15) ===
Legend
Major championships (3)
Japan Invitational (0)
World Series of Bowling (3)
PBA Tour standard events (9)

No.	Date	Tournament	Championship Match	Runner(s)-up	Money ($)
1	6 Sep, 2009	PBA Chameleon Championship	205–192	(United States) Ronnie Russell	25,000
2	28 Feb, 2010	U.S. Open	267–207	(United States) Mike Scroggins	60,000
3	5 Nov, 2010	PBA Viper Championship	236–203	(Colombia) Andres Gomez	15,000
4	5 Nov, 2012	PBA Cheetah Championship	243–192	(United States) Mike Wolfe	20,000
5	24 May, 2014	PBA Badger Open	243–235	(United States) Brian Valenta	10,000
6	17 May, 2015	PBA Oklahoma Open	247–172	(Australia) Jason Belmonte	18,000
7	2 Aug, 2015	PBA/PWBA Striking Against Breast Cancer Mixed Doubles (with Shannon O'Keefe)	8782–8707	(United States) Chris Barnes & (United States) Lynda Barnes	15,000 (7,500 each)
8	31 Jul, 2016	PBA/PWBA Striking Against Breast Cancer Mixed Doubles (with Shannon O'Keefe)	8902–8860	(Australia) Jason Belmonte & (United States) Diandra Asbaty	16,000 (8,000 each)
9	25 Feb, 2018	Roth/Holman PBA Doubles Championship (with Jason Belmonte)	205–185	(United States) Michael Tang & (United States) Darren Tang	24,000 (12,000 each)
10	6 Jan, 2019	PBA Hall of Fame Classic	199–194	(United States) Jakob Butturff	25,000
11	6 Jan, 2019	PBA Harry O'Neale Chesapeake Open	257–216	(United States) A. J. Chapman	10,000
12	15 Feb, 2020	PBA Players Championship	233–232	(United States) E. J. Tackett	75,000
13	12 Oct, 2020	PBA Playoffs	235–203; 249–195	(United States) Anthony Simonsen	100,000
14	15 Jan, 2024	PBA Players Championship	209–178	(United States) Tom Smallwood	100,000
15	8 Feb, 2025	Roth/Holman PBA Doubles Championship (with Jason Belmonte)	210–169	(United States) Shawn Maldonado & (United States) D. J. Archer	50,000 (25,000 each)

== World Series of Bowling ==
=== Wins (3) ===
O'Neill, Jason Belmonte, and E. J. Tackett are the only three PBA bowlers to have won titles at three different PBA World Series of Bowling events.

Year	Championship	Final score	Runner-up	Earnings ($)
2009	Chameleon Championship	205-192	(United States) Ronnie Russell	25,000
2010	Viper Championship	236-203	(Colombia) Andres Gomez	15,000
2012	Cheetah Championship	243-192	(United States) Mike Wolfe	20,000

=== Results timeline ===
Results not in chronological order.

Tournament	2008	2009	2010	2011	2012	2013	2014	2015	2016	2017	2018	2019	2020	2021	2022	2023	2024	2025	2026
Cheetah Championship	11	39	13	7	1	104	64	41	60	16	NH	8	14	20	47	20	64	NH	9
Viper Championship	8	44	1	6	31	26	25	11	Not Held									18	NH
Chameleon Championship	2	1	10	104	9	9	131	7	62	40	NH	10	9	9	Not Held			28	14
Scorpion Championship	15	35	4	53	72	122	71	85	95	13	NH	3	37	35	25	15	37	34	30
Shark Championship	29	60	23	18	Not Held				19	83	Not Held				75	12	49	73	30
Doubles Championship	Not Held			NI	Not Held			Not Included						6	8	NI	2	Not Included	

Win
Top 10
Did not play

"T" = Tied for a place

== International achievements ==
Bill is a seven-time member of Team USA. He bowled for Team USA at the 2010 WTBA World Men's Championships, where he won the gold medal match in singles over South Korea's Bok Eum Choi, 244–202. He also won a trios gold medal with Chris Barnes and Rhino Page, while helping Team USA to gold medals in team and all-events. In 2012, he became the first non-Finnish winner in the Ballmaster Open held in Helsinki.

== Career statistics ==
Statistics are through the last complete PBA Tour season.

Season	Events	Cashes	Match Play	CRA+	PBA Titles	Average	Earnings ($)
2004–05	3	1	0	0	0	204.80	2,000
2005–06	20	18	11	1	0	215.06	61,080
2006–07	19	19	12	1	0	219.56	48,180
2007–08	19	19	13	1	0	216.92	46,275
2008–09	20	20	18	7	0	222.96	91,680
2009–10	19	18	10	5	2	219.21	147,275
2010–11	12	12	9	4	1	220.24	97,290
2011–12	13	11	7	2	0	225.85	39,510
2012–13	25	20	9	3	1	223.99	79,461
2014	18	14	6	4	1	221.74	85,996
2015	21	16	14	5	2	226.70	100,698
2016	24	15	8	2	1	218.35	55,705
2017	17	12	6	1	0	219.57	58,470
2018	17	13	5	1	1	219.47	65,813
2019	26	21	13	7	2	217.87	185,148
2020	13	11	7	3	2	--	272,285
2021	13	10	7	1	0	219.79	53,755
2022	15	11	11	0	0	216.72	58,775
2023	14	12	4	1	0	219.92	69,905
2024	16	11	9	7	1	224.40	198,540
2025	16	12	6	2	1	222.43	90,080

+CRA = Championship Round Appearances

== Personal ==
Bill married Christi White in May 2010. White is a former NCAA bowler and graduate of Fairleigh Dickinson University. Christi delivered the couple's first child, their son Gavin, in February 2013 and a daughter, Avery, in September 2017.
