= Mike Limongello =

American professional ten-pin bowler

Personal information
- Nickname: Lemon
- Born: October 10, 1944 (age 81) Jersey City, New Jersey, U.S.
- Years active: 1963–1976
- Height: 5 ft 10 in (178 cm)

Bowling Information
- Affiliation: PBA
- Rookie year: 1963
- Dominant hand: Right (stroker delivery)
- Wins: 6 PBA Tour (2 majors)
- 300-games: 10

Mike Limongello of New Jersey is a retired professional ten-pin bowler who was a member of the Professional Bowlers Association and part of the PBA Tour for over twelve years. While on tour, Limongello won a total of six tournaments (including two majors), was a five-time runner-up, and appeared in the top-five an additional twelve times.

Limongello's first major tour victory was at the 1971 U.S. Open, the first modern-day tournament previously known as the BPAA All-Star. Earning the open's second seed heading into the finals, Mike won his semifinal match over Wayne Zahn 203–171 and then defeated Teata Semiz in the championship match 194–186.

Later in 1971, Limongello's second major victory and inevitably his last win on the tour, was at the 12th Annual PBA National Championship. Qualifying as the fourth seed for the final rounds, Mike won the needed three matches to reach the title match, where he narrowly defeated Dave Davis 207–202.

Plagued by recurring back problems from an injury in 1972, Limongello officially retired from the PBA Tour in 1976.

Limongello was inducted into the PBA Hall of Fame in 1994.

== PBA Tour Victories ==
Major championships are in bold text.

1. 1965 Oklahoma City PBA Open (Oklahoma City, OK)
2. 1966 Mobile-Sertoma Open (Mobile, AL)
3. 1968 Cougar Open (Kansas City, KS)
4. 1970 Don Carter Classic (New York City, NY)
5. **1971 BPAA U.S. Open** (St. Paul, MN)
6. **1971 PBA National Championship** (Paramus, NJ)
