= Jeff Carter (bowler) =

American professional ten-pin bowler

Jeff Carter (born June 18, 1969) is a retired right-handed American professional ten-pin bowler, member of the Professional Bowlers Association. He joined the PBA in 1999.

== PBA career ==
Carter has one career PBA Tour title. He has made three championship round appearances, the first two of which came in the 2006–07 season, his first as an exempt bowler. Is 3–2 with a 212 average in three career TV singles appearances. One of those finals appearances came in the 64th U.S. Open where he fell to Pete Weber, 267–192. Carter was on the opposite end of history as Ryan Shafer fired the 18th televised 300 game in PBA history against him in the 2007 PBA Pepsi Championship. He was named the 1999 PBA Midwest Region Rookie of the Year and the 2005–06 PBA Midwest Region Player of the Year. Earned his first career exemption by leading the 2005–06 PBA Midwest Region point rankings. Owns 12 career PBA Regional Tour titles and over $125,000 in regional earnings. Total career PBA winnings stand at over $400,000 ($281,605 on the PBA Tour).

2006–07: In his first season as an exempt bowler, did not disappoint by finishing 26th in the PBA World Point Rankings, qualifying for match play nine times and appearing in two TV finals. While surviving as a middle-of-the-pack bowler for most of the season, Carter made a big push at the conclusion of the season to solidify his point ranking and secure a second exemption. Made his first two career TV appearances in back-to-back shows, the 64th U.S. Open and 2007 Pepsi Championship. Defeated Dave D'Entremont, 185–183, in the first stepladder match of the 64th U.S. Open before falling to eventual champion Pete Weber, 267–192, in the second match... Carter had earlier been on top in the prestigious Major, leading the first eight-game block of qualifying... Followed up the performance one week later with a second TV appearance in a stepladder final, this time as the No. 2 seed... Became the victim of the Denny's PBA Tour's 18th televised perfect game, falling to Ryan Shafer, 300–228. Made match play the following week in the 2007 Denny's World Championship before bowing out in the Round of 32... Advanced to the Round of 8 in the 2007 Earl Anthony Medford Classic before falling, 4–2, to Patrick Healey Jr. Ranked 12th on Tour in single elimination match play multi-pin conversion rate (83.33).

2007–08: Competed in the first four events of the season before filing for an injury deferment... Had surgery on his right hand and was granted a deferment of his exemption to the 2008–09 season by PBA Commissioner and CEO Fred Schreyer... Competed in his first career Japan Cup to open the season, finishing 58th... Missed match play in the first three events to start the regular season and withdrew from the next few events before receiving his deferment... Came back toward the end of the season to compete in the Denny's World Championship and 65th Denny's U.S. Open... Finished 67th in the World Championship and just missed match play in the U.S. Open, finishing 30th.

2008–09: Carter ended his 122-tournament quest for his first Lumber Liquidators PBA Tour title February 22, 2009, defeating his idol Pete Weber, 235–213, to win the GEICO Plastic Ball Championship at Brunswick Zone-Wheat Ridge.

2009–10: Despite nagging injuries, Carter cashed in 17 of 18 events, and made match play seven times. He had an eighth-place finish in the 2009 PBA World Championship.

== Records and milestones ==
Carter holds the USBC record for the highest sanctioned league average, when he averaged 261.74 in 2000-2001. This record still stands today. Carter was using Ebonite Vortex bowling balls for that league.

Carter has also bowled 112 sanctioned 300 games. In PBA events, he has recorded 24 perfect games through the 2009–10 season.

== Personal ==
Carter resides in Springfield, Illinois with his children.

== Mary Teubner Memorial Classic ==
On the PBA Midwest Regional Tour, Carter hosts the Mary Teubner Memorial Classic, which is named in memory of close and longtime friend Mary Teubner who died of intestinal cancer in 2001. Carter is very active in devoting his time to raising money to help find a cure for the devastating disease.

== Sources ==
- https://www.jeffcarterbowling.com
- http://www.pba.com/players/singlebio03.asp?ID=6673
