= Ron Palombi Jr. =

American professional ten-pin bowler

Ron Palombi, Jr.
Personal information
- Born: June 27, 1962 (age 64) Erie, Pennsylvania, U.S.
- Education: Mercyhurst Preparatory School (Erie, PA)
- Years active: 1983–1996
- Height: 6 ft 3 in (191 cm)

Bowling Information
- Affiliation: PBA
- Rookie year: 1983
- Dominant hand: Right
- Wins: 6 PBA Tour (2 majors)

Ron Palombi, Jr. of Erie, Pennsylvania is a retired professional 10-pin bowler who was a member of the Professional Bowlers Association, bowling on the PBA Tour. During his thirteen years on tour, Ron collected six titles (including two PBA majors), four time runner-up finishes, and made an additional fifteen appearances in the top-five.

Palombi, Jr. conquered his first tour victory at the 1984 Tucson Open. As the final round's top seed, he defeated Mark Fahy 208–207 in the title match by striking out in the 10th frame.

Ron's first PBA major win was captured at the 1990 U.S. Open. Qualifying for the final round as a top seed, Ron defeated Amleto Monacelli 269–205 in the championship match, on the strength of rolling eight consecutive strikes.

Ron's second PBA major, also his sixth and (eventual) last win on the tour, was secured at the 1993 PBA National Championship. Going into the finals as the top seed, Ron defeated Eugene McCune 237–224 in the championship match.

Ron is an inductee of the Erie Pennsylvania Sports Hall of Fame and the Pennsylvania USBC Hall of Fame.

== PBA Tour titles ==
Major championships are in bold type.

1. 1984 Tucson Open (Tucson, AZ)
2. 1987 True Value Open (Indianapolis, IN)
3. 1988 Kodak Invitational (Rochester, NY)
4. **1990 Seagram's Coolers U.S. Open** (Indianapolis, IN)
5. 1990 Fair Lanes Phoenix Classic (Phoenix, AZ)
6. **1993 Bud Light PBA National Championship** (Toledo, OH)
