= Mike Scroggins =

American bowling player (born 1964)

Personal information
- Born: March 12, 1964 (age 62)
- Years active: 1989-present

Bowling Information
- Affiliation: PBA
- Rookie year: 1992
- Dominant hand: Left
- Wins: 8 PBA Tour (2 majors); 3 PBA50 Tour; 40 PBA Regional Tour; 4 PBA50 Regional Tour
- 300-games: 39
- Sponsors: Storm Products

Mike Scroggins (born March 12, 1964) is a left-handed professional ten-pin bowler and member of the Professional Bowlers Association (PBA), having joined in 1989. He resides in Amarillo, TX. He has won eight PBA Tour titles in his career, including two majors. He won the USBC Masters in 2005 and the Lumber Liquidators 66th U.S. Open in 2009. He has 39 career PBA 300 games, and stood at over $1.45 million in career PBA earnings following the 2017 PBA50 season. He also has three PBA50 Tour titles. Scroggins was elected to the PBA Hall of Fame in 2016, and was officially inducted with the 2017 class.

== Career ==
After bowling collegiately at West Texas State University, Scroggins joined the PBA tour in 1989. His first title was the 1992 Sacramento Open, in his television debut. He then went 12 years without a title until he won the Baby Ruth Real Deal Classic in the 2003–04 season. In the 2005–06 season he won his first career major, the 2005 USBC Masters. He cashed a career-high $205,270 in 2005–06 and set a PBA record this season by rolling 79 straight games of 200 or higher over a two-tournament span, breaking the previous record of 61 games set by Walter Ray Williams Jr.

In the 2007–08 season, he won multiple titles in one season for the first time in his career: in Fountain Valley, CA and Omaha, NE.

In 2009, he won the 66th Lumber Liquidators U.S. Open, the second major of his career. As the #2 seed, he defeated Chris Barnes 200–199 in the semifinal. Barnes, who was aiming to win Player of the Year with the U.S. Open title, needed a strike and six pins to win the match. However, he suffered from possibly the worst break in bowling, leaving a solid 8 pin on his first shot of the 10th frame. Then, needing a strike to tie, he left the flat 10 pin on nearly the exact same shot line, which gave Scroggins the win. Scroggins moved on to play defending champion and top seed Norm Duke in the final. Duke, like Barnes, also had a chance to win Player of the Year with a U.S. Open title. But Scroggins defeated Duke 191–173 to win his second career major. In winning the title he earned $100,000 in prize money and a three-year tour exemption.

He had a chance to repeat as U.S. Open champion when he qualified as the #1 seed for the February 28, 2010 TV finals. However, he lost in the final match to Bill O'Neill, 267–207. Scroggins would rebound the very next week, winning his 8th PBA title at the Etonic Don Johnson Eliminator Championship. This was his second title of the 2009–10 season, following his earlier win at the Pepsi Red, White & Blue Open. He finished the 2009–10 season tied with Walter Ray Williams Jr. and Bill O'Neill in PBA Player of the Year points, but the honor went to Williams in an overall competition points tie-breaker.

Scroggins has 40 PBA Regional titles (fourth most all-time), four PBA50 Regional titles, and is a four-time PBA Southwest Region Player of the Year. He also currently holds the second-highest league average ever recorded in USBC history—256.8 in a 1999-2000 Amarillo, TX trio league. It was the highest league average until Jeff Carter established a new record the following season with a 261.7 average. Scroggins also holds the USBC record for most sanctioned 800 series in a season (15).

Scroggins ranked #20 on the PBA's 2025 "Best 25 PBA Players of the Last 25 Seasons" list. The ranking was based on a points system that took into account standard titles, major titles, top-five finishes and Player of the Year awards.

== PBA Tour titles ==
=== National PBA Tour ===
Major titles in bold type.

1. 1992 ARC Sacramento Open (Pinole, CA)
2. 2003–04 Baby Ruth Real Deal Classic (Belleville, IL)
3. **2005–06 USBC Masters** (Wauwatosa, WI)
4. 2007–08 Motel 6 Dick Weber Open (Fountain Valley, CA)
5. 2007–08 Pepsi Championship (Elkhorn, NE)
6. **2008–09 Lumber Liquidators U.S. Open** (North Brunswick, NJ)
7. 2009–10 Pepsi Red, White and Blue Open (Wichita, KS)
8. 2009–10 Etonic Don Johnson Eliminator Championship (Columbus, OH)

=== PBA50 Tour ===
1. 2015 UnitedHealthcare Sun Bowl (The Villages, FL)
2. 2015 Johnny Petraglia BVL Open (Farmingdale, NY)
3. 2015 DeHayes Insurance Group Championship (Fort Wayne, IN)

== Personal ==
Scroggins lives in Amarillo, TX with his wife Melanie. The couple has three children. He has a twin brother, Mark, a 12-time PBA Regional Tour champion who was the 1993 PBA Rookie of the Year and was exempt for the 2007-08 PBA season.
