= Tim Criss =

American professional ten-pin bowler

Personal information
- Nickname: Turtle
- Born: Bel Air, Maryland, U.S.
- Education: C. Milton Wright High School (Bel Air, MD)
- Years active: 1991–2007
- Height: 5 ft 10 in (178 cm)

Bowling Information
- Affiliation: PBA
- Rookie year: 1991
- Dominant hand: Right
- Wins: 5 PBA Tour (1 major); 22 Regional Tour

Tim Criss of Bel Air, Maryland is a retired professional ten-pin bowler who was a member of the Professional Bowlers Association, bowling on both the regional (eastern) and national PBA Tour. On the national tour, Tim captured five victories (including 1 major), four runner-up finishes, and made an additional nineteen top-five appearances.

Criss' run of national tour victories and runner-up finishes all happened between 1997 and 1999.

Tim's major tour win was at the 1999 PBA National Championship, qualifying as the #1 seed and then defeating Dave Arnold 238–161 in the title match. Tim also has twenty-two wins on the regional tour.

Criss earned the nickname "Turtle" for his slow and deliberate delivery.

Criss won the PBA's Steve Nagy Sportsmanship award in 1998 (co-winner with Butch Soper) and 2004.

In 2002, Criss was inducted into the Cecil Harford USBC Hall of Fame for Superior Performance.

== PBA Tour titles ==
Major championships are in bold type.

1. 1997 Flagship Open (Erie, PA)
2. 1997 Greater Sebring Open (Sebring, FL)
3. 1997 Merit Mixed Doubles Championship (with Carol Gianotti-Block) (Las Vegas, NV)
4. 1998 PBA Northwest Classic (Richland, WA)
5. **1999 PBA National Championship** (Toledo, OH)
