= Calcium Lime Rust =

Brand of household cleaning product

Calcium Lime Rust, more commonly known as CLR, is a household cleaning product used for dissolving stains, such as calcium, lime, and iron oxide deposits. It is made by American company Jelmar LLC.

== Ingredients ==
CLR's ingredients may include various compounds:

- Water
- Lactic acid
- gluconic acid
- Lauramine oxide
- Propylene glycol
- n-Butyl ether
- Glycolic acid
- Sulfamic acid
- Disodium capryloamphodipropionate
- ethylene glycol n-butyl ether
- Citric acid

One formulation is (by weight) lactic acid 12–18%, gluconic acid 2.50–3.75%, lauramine oxide 1.50–3.25%, with the remainder being water. The product also contained phosphoric acid at one time, but it is now phosphate-free.

== Mechanism of action ==
Weak acids, such as lactic acid, citric acid, and phosphoric acid, are commonly used in cleaning products like CLR to effectively dissolve calcium deposits and rust. These acids work by reacting with the calcium carbonate and iron oxide present in the stains. The chemical reaction results in the formation of soluble salts, which can be easily rinsed away with water.

=== Dissolution of calcium deposits ===
Calcium deposits, primarily composed of calcium carbonate (CaCO_{3}), react with weak acids to form calcium salts that are soluble in water. The general reaction can be represented as follows:

CaCO_{3} + 2H^{+} → Ca^{2+} + CO_{2} + H_{2}O

Here, H^{+} represents the hydrogen ions provided by the acid. The calcium ions (Ca^{2+}) and carbon dioxide (CO_{2}) are formed, which helps in the easy removal of the deposit.

=== Removal of rust ===
Rust, which is primarily composed of iron oxides (Fe_{2}O_{3}), also reacts with weak acids to form soluble iron salts. The reaction can be simplified as:

Fe_{2}O_{3} + 6H^{+} → 2Fe^{3+} + 3H_{2}O

In this process, iron ions (Fe^{3+}) are produced along with water, making the rust easier to remove without causing damage to the underlying metal or surrounding materials.

== Maker ==
CLR is made by Jelmar LLC, an American company located in Skokie, Illinois. The company was founded in 1967 by Manny Gutterman. As of 2019, the company was still owned and operated by Gutterman's family.

== See also ==
- List of cleaning agents
