= Norm Duke =

American professional bowler

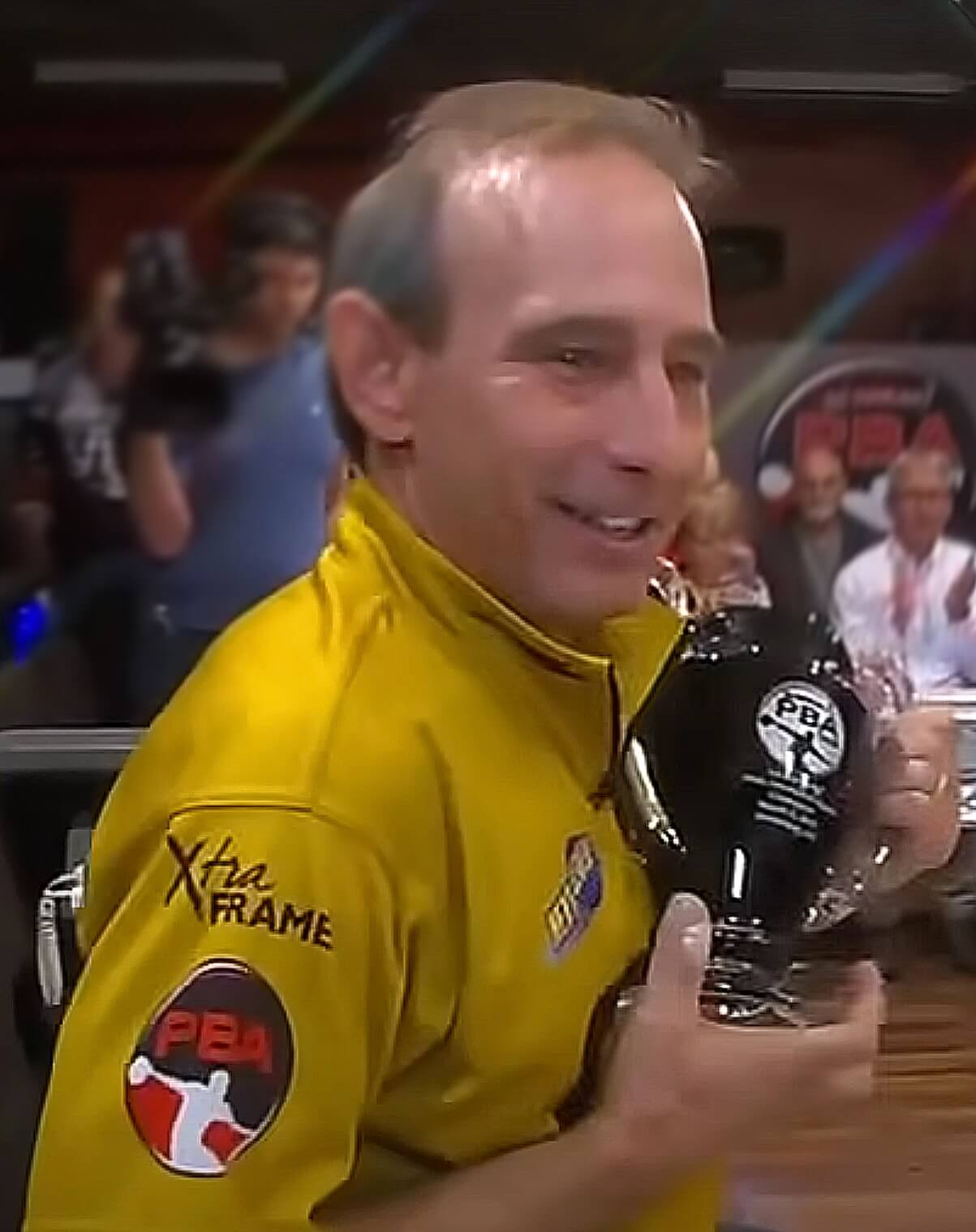
- Duke in 2019

Personal information
- Born: March 25, 1964 (age 62) Mount Pleasant, Texas, U.S.
- Years active: 1982–2022
- Height: 5 ft 5 in (165 cm)

Bowling Information
- Affiliation: PBA
- Rookie year: 1983
- Dominant hand: Right (stroker delivery)
- Wins: 40 PBA Tour (7 majors); 6 PBA50 Tour (2 majors)
- 300-games: 73
- Sponsors: Storm Products

Norm Duke (born March 25, 1964) is an American retired professional bowler who previously competed on the Professional Bowlers Association (PBA) Tour and on the PBA50 Tour. He has won 40 titles on the PBA Tour, including seven major championships, and another six titles (two of them majors) on the PBA50 Tour. A member of both the PBA and USBC Halls of Fame, Duke is one of only three players in history to reach 40 career PBA Tour titles. He has bowled 73 perfect 300 games in PBA competition, including the 16th televised 300 game in PBA Tour history on January 5, 2003. Duke is a member of the Storm pro staff.

A native of Mount Pleasant, Texas, Duke resides in Clermont, Florida, with his wife Karen. The two have a son named Branden.

== PBA Tour ==
In 1983, not even one year after becoming a professional, Duke won the Cleveland Open in North Olmsted, Ohio, and became the youngest player ever to win a PBA Tour title, at 18 years and 345 days. On that day, Duke started from the No. 5 seed and worked his way up the stepladder, defeating the other four bowlers to take the championship, including a victory over the legendary Earl Anthony in Duke's first-ever televised match. Duke would not win his second title until 1991, but his career took off from there. He won two titles in the 1993 season, including his first major at the ABC Masters (now known as the USBC Masters).

Norm completed perhaps his best season in 1994, winning five titles including his second career major, at the Tournament of Champions, and also winning PBA Player of the Year honors. He was also the winner of the PBA Player of the Year award in 2000, capturing three titles that year, including his third career major by winning the PBA World Championship. Duke became a member of the USBC Hall of Fame in 2002, and was inducted into the PBA Hall of Fame in January 2009.

Duke currently owns 40 PBA Tour titles, including seven majors: one ABC Masters, one PBA Tournament of Champions, two United States Opens, and three PBA World Championships. By virtue of having won each of these four majors, Duke is one of only three bowlers in Tour history to complete the career Grand Slam, along with fellow Hall-of-Famer Mike Aulby and all-time major titles record holder Jason Belmonte. His 38th title on February 15, 2015 put him in sole possession of third-place on the PBA's all-time titles list. Duke's career PBA Tour earnings eclipsed $3 million in the 2011-12 season, making him just the third PBA bowler at the time (along with Walter Ray Williams Jr. and Pete Weber) to surpass the $3 million mark in career prize money. Parker Bohn III has since also joined the $3 million club. Duke's career earnings have now topped $3.8 million (as of 2022). Duke made multiple TV Finals appearances every season from 1990 through 2015. (He made only one TV finals appearance in 2016.) He has won at least two titles in a season nine times, including a career-best five titles in 1994.

The diminutive Duke (he stands 1.65 meters, or 5-foot-5) is known for his exceptional versatility. He is generally thought of as a stroker, either throwing the ball relatively straight or playing a hook shot from the extreme outside of the lane. But he has also shown the ability (especially earlier in his career) to swing the ball out toward the gutter and bring it back like a cranker when necessary. This gives him the advantage of being able to score well on most of the PBA's multiple oil patterns.

=== 2007–08 season ===
The 2007-08 season started slowly for Duke, as he battled illness on top of a series of injuries through the first half. Standing 51st in points and with his Tour exemption in jeopardy, he put together a furious finish by winning two majors in the final five weeks of the season. On February 24, 2008, he won his second career PBA World Championship to lock up a 2008-09 exemption. Then on March 30, he won the U.S. Open and joined Mike Aulby and Billy Hardwick as the only bowlers to ever complete the coveted PBA "Grand Slam," in which a PBA bowler wins the U.S. Open, World Championship, Tournament of Champions, and USBC Masters at least once in a career. He is also one of only nine bowlers in history to complete the PBA career Triple Crown, in which a player wins the PBA's "original" three majors (U.S. Open, Tournament of Champions, and World Championship).

=== 2008–09 season ===
Duke began the 2008-09 season by, again, winning the PBA World Championship. Continuing on his success from the previous season's sweep of the final two majors, he accomplished something never before done by any professional bowler: win three consecutive major tournaments. The streak ended when he failed to make the TV finals for the 2009 Tournament of Champions. On April 5, 2009, Duke narrowly missed an opportunity to become just the fifth bowler to repeat as champion at the U.S. Open. He qualified as the #1 seed, but was upset in the final by Mike Scroggins, 191–173. Duke eventually did win a second U.S. Open on February 27, 2011.

=== Later career ===
Duke's 37th title on the PBA Tour came in 2012 at the Dick Weber PBA Playoffs. He joined the PBA50 Tour (formerly PBA Senior Tour) in 2014, while continuing to compete in selected events on the standard PBA Tour. His 38th title on the standard PBA Tour came in the 2015 Mark Roth-Marshall Holman PBA Doubles Championship, where he partnered with Wes Malott for the win.

He captured his 39th PBA title on February 24, 2019 at the PBA Indianapolis Open, defeating Jason Belmonte in the title match. A month shy of his 55th birthday, Duke became the third oldest player to win a standard PBA Tour event, behind John Handegard (57) and Buzz Fazio (winner of two titles at age 56). One week later, he won his 40th PBA Tour title at the PBA Jonesboro Open, becoming the third player in history to win 40 PBA Tour titles (after Walter Ray Williams Jr. and Earl Anthony). It was also the first time in Duke's career that he had ever won PBA titles in back-to-back weeks. A testament to Duke's versatility, both victories were on mixed lane conditions, with the left lane and right lane featuring different lengths and layouts of oil. In 2019, Duke posted the most cashes (20) and match-play appearances (17) on the PBA Tour since his 2005 season, and his highest earnings since 2008.

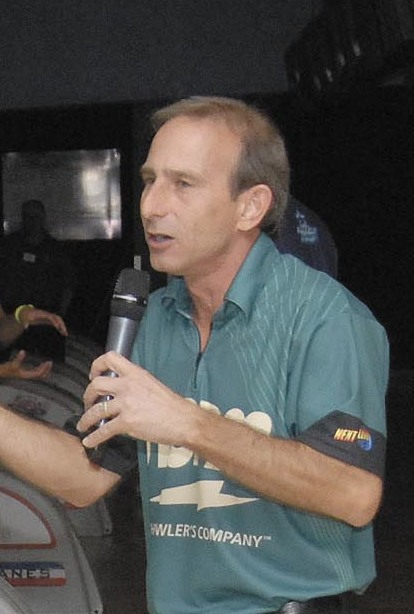
Duke at a bowling exhibition and clinic in 2011

On his longevity, Duke stated in 2020:

"Bowling for a living is so different than most people think. It requires a tremendous commitment to excellence as well as a willingness to expose yourself to failure on a constant basis. Add in a myriad of travel delays and time away from the family; just being happy becomes a chore. The players that mentally manage the grind of the Tour and are able to stay in love with the sport are the ones that have the best chance of sustaining a good career. I have been on the PBA Tour for 38 years and I am as committed now as when I started out in 1982."

On April 2, 2022, the 58-year old Duke claimed the top seed (out of 420 competitors) at the USBC Masters. Seeking to become the oldest player to win a PBA Tour title and oldest to win a major, he was defeated in the April 3 final by Anthony Simonsen, 219–216. Prior to the finals, Duke announced that unless he qualified for the upcoming PBA Tour Playoffs (he needed a win to qualify), he would be retiring from full-time competition on the PBA Tour. He will still bowl in PBA Regional Tour and PBA50 Tour events.

Duke made his final televised PBA Tour appearance at the 2022 PBA League Elias Cup Finals in Portland, Maine on July 10. He reprised his role as the player/manager for the Dallas Strikers, bowling lead-off for the team. The Strikers made it to the final match against the Portland Lumberjacks. After Duke's doubles partner Wes Malott clinched the tournament for Portland with a spare in the 10th frame of the final game, he yielded his fill shot to Duke. Poetically, Duke closed out his full-time PBA Tour career with a strike. Duke's departure from the PBA Tour was met with much emotion from bowlers and fans alike, so much so that the hashtag #ThankYouNorm began trending throughout the community shortly before he made his final TV appearance.

Despite starting the 21st century at age 36, Duke ranked #3 on the PBA's 2025 "Best 25 PBA Players of the Last 25 Seasons" list. The ranking was based on a points system that took into account standard titles, major titles, top-five finishes and Player of the Year awards.

== PBA50 Tour ==
In 2014, Norm won two PBA50 titles, including the Senior U.S. Open, in his first season on the PBA50 Tour. For his efforts, he won both PBA50 Rookie of the Year and PBA50 Player of the Year honors. He is one of only three PBA50 players (with Tom Baker and Tom Hess) to win both awards in the same season. In 2016, he won his third PBA50 title and second PBA50 major at the PBA50 World Championship. He has since won three more standard titles on the PBA50 Tour, in 2017, 2018 and 2021. The latest victory made Duke one of eight players in history to win a PBA Tour or PBA50 Tour title in five different decades, joining Dick Weber, Dave Soutar, Johnny Petraglia, Walter Ray Williams Jr., Pete Weber, Parker Bohn III and Amleto Monacelli.

== Awards and recognition ==
- Two-time U.S. Open winner (2008, 2011) and three-time PBA World Championship winner (2000, 2007–08, 2008–09)
- Two-time PBA Player of the Year (1994, 2000)
- George Young High Average award (1991, 1994, 2005–06, 2006–07)
- Harry Smith PBA Points Leader award (2005–06)
- In his first year on tour (1983), Duke won the tour stop in Cleveland, OH at age 18 years, 345 days, which is still the record for the youngest person to ever capture a PBA title.
- During the 2006-07 Denny's PBA Tour season, Norm broke the tour's average record for a season, averaging 228.47; this record lasted seven years until being topped by Jason Belmonte's 228.81 in the 2012-13 season.
- Inducted into USBC Hall of Fame, 2002
- During qualifying for an April 1996 PBA tournament held in North Brunswick, N.J., Duke bowled three consecutive perfect games (900 total) in two squads.
- 71 career perfect games in PBA events (through mid-2018 season)
- One of three bowlers to have earned the career "Grand Slam" (winning the USBC Masters, PBA World Championship, PBA Tournament of Champions, and US Open)
- 5x ESPY Award winner for Best Bowler (1995, 2007, 2008, 2009, 2019)
- Ranked #7 on the PBA's 2008 list of "50 Greatest Players of the Last 50 Years"
- First bowler in history to win three Major titles in a row
- Inducted into PBA Hall of Fame on January 24, 2009
- BPAA Dick Weber Bowling Ambassador Award winner, 2012
- PBA50 Rookie of the Year, 2014
- PBA50 Player of the Year, 2014
- Ranked #3 on the PBA's 2025 list of "Best 25 Players of the Last 25 Seasons"

== Additional work and honors ==
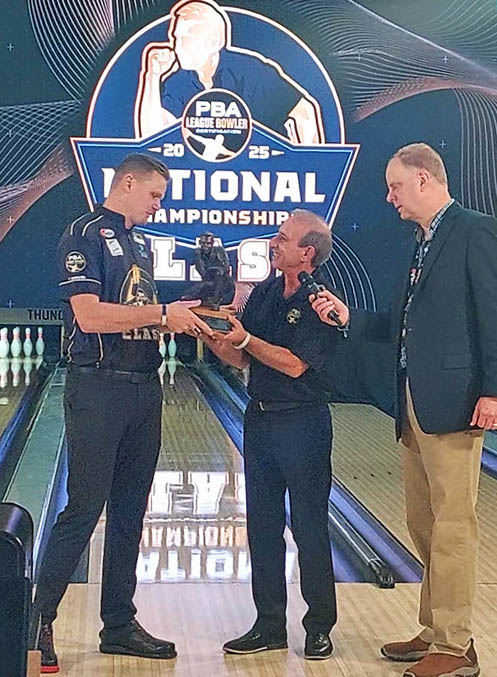
Norm presenting The Duke trophy to Andrew Anderson in 2025

- During the 2006-07 Denny's PBA Tour season, Duke served as a guest commentator on ESPN telecasts for events in which he failed to reach the TV Finals alongside Dave Ryan and Randy Pedersen. During events in which he made the TV Finals, Chris Barnes filled in as the third commentator. He has continued to appear on some PBA telecasts as a third commentator through the present day.
- Since 2023, the PBA has held a PBA League Bowler Certification (LBC) tournament featuring players at all skill levels (amateur-pro, male-female, junior to senior). All division winners meet at the PBA LBC National Champions Clash, with the Clash champion earning "The Duke" trophy, named in honor of Norm.
- In June 2026, the PBA held the inaugural PBA Norm Duke Open in Bethlehem, Pennsylvania. The PBA debuted the "Norm Duke 39" (39 feet) oil pattern in this same tournament.

== Career Tour Titles ==
=== PBA Tour Titles ===
Major championships are in bold text.

1. 1983 Cleveland Open, Cleveland, Ohio.
2. 1991 Bud Light Open, Parma Heights, Ohio.
3. 1991 Tucson Open, Tucson, Ariz.
4. **1993 ABC Masters**, Tulsa, Okla.
5. 1993 Greater Detroit Open, Taylor, Mich.
6. 1994 AC-Delco Classic, Lakewood, Calif.
7. 1994 Choice Hotels Classic, Edmond, Okla.
8. 1994 Brunswick Johnny Petraglia Open, N. Brunswick, N.J.
9. **1994 Tournament of Champions**, Akron, Ohio.
10. 1994 Rochester Open, Rochester, N.Y.
11. 1995 Oregon Open, Portland, Ore.
12. 1995 Cleveland Open, Cleveland, Ohio.
13. 1997 IOF Foresters Open, Mississauga, Canada.
14. 1997 Ebonite Challenge 1, Windsor Locks, Conn.
15. 1998 Tucson Open, Tucson, Ariz.
16. 1998 Rochester Open, Rochester, N.Y.
17. 1998 Brunswick Circuit Pro Bowling Classic, Wichita, Kan.
18. 2000 Brunswick Pro Source Don Carter Classic, Dallas, Texas.
19. **2000 PBA National Championship**, Toledo, Ohio.
20. 2000 MSN Open, Tucson, Ariz.
21. 2002-03 PBA Cambridge Credit Classic, Syosset, N.Y.
22. 2003-04 PBA Greater Kansas City Classic, Blue Springs, Mo.
23. 2004-05 PBA Atlanta Classic, Norcross, Ga.
24. 2005-06 Ace Hardware Championship, Taylor, Mich.
25. 2006-07 Lake County Indiana Classic, Hammond, Ind.
26. 2006-07 Columbia 300 Classic, West Babylon, N.Y.
27. 2006-07 Pepsi Championship, Indianapolis, Ind.
28. **2007-08 PBA World Championship**, Indianapolis, Ind.
29. **2007-08 U.S. Open**, North Brunswick, N.J.
30. **2008-09 PBA World Championship**, Wichita, Kan.
31. 2008-09 Don and Paula Carter Mixed Doubles Championship w/Liz Johnson, Reno, Nev.
32. 2008-09 Denny's Dick Weber Open, Fountain Valley, Calif.
33. 2009-10 PBA Cheetah Championship, Allen Park, Mich.
34. **2010-11 U.S. Open**, North Brunswick, N.J.
35. 2011-12 Detroit Open, Allen Park, Mich.
36. 2011-12 Mark Roth/Marshall Holman Doubles Championship w/Wes Malott, Las Vegas, NV.
37. 2011-12 PBA Dick Weber Playoffs, Indianapolis, Ind.
38. 2015 Mark Roth/Marshall Holman Doubles Championship w/Wes Malott, Indianapolis, Ind.
39. 2019 Go Bowling! PBA Indianapolis Open, Indianapolis, Ind.
40. 2019 Go Bowling! PBA Jonesboro Open, Jonesboro, Ark.

=== PBA50 Tour Titles ===
1. 2014 PBA50 UnitedHealthcare Sun Bowl In The Villages, The Villages, Fla.
2. **2014 Senior U.S. Open**, Las Vegas, NV.
3. **2016 PBA50 World Championship**, Welch, Minn.
4. 2017 PBA50 Race City Open, Mooresville, N.C.
5. 2018 PBA50 Security Federal Savings Bank Championship, Kokomo, Ind.
6. 2021 PBA50 David Small's JAX 60 Open, Jackson, Mich.

== Trick Shots ==
- Duke is also famed for his "trickshots," with his most notable being his well-renowned "Towel Shot." This is where he can sling a ball wrapped in a towel and consistently throw a strike. In September 2009 (broadcast October 25 on ESPN), Duke won the PBA's special Trick Shot Challenge event.
