= PBA World Championship =

Bowling tournament

The PBA World Championship is one of five major PBA (Professional Bowlers Association) bowling events. It is one of three PBA Tour major events that are open only to PBA members. (The U.S. Open and USBC Masters allow qualifying amateurs to enter.)

Prior to 2002, the tournament was called the PBA National Championship. The PBA National Championship was first contested on November 28, 1960, then called the First Annual National Championship; the winner was PBA Hall of Famer Don Carter. Tournament champions currently win the Earl Anthony Trophy, named in honor of the late PBA legend who won this title a record six times with a pair of threepeats (1973–75 and 1981–83). The World Championship has offered a $100,000 top prize in multiple seasons, and as much as $150,000 in 2020.

== Background ==
The National Championship and World Championship have been contested over the years using a variety of formats. Currently, the PBA World Championship format is different from normal PBA Tour events. Since the 2009–10 season, the initial qualifying scores for the World Championship have come from other stand-alone tournaments at the PBA World Series of Bowling, which celebrated its 17th anniversary in 2026. Thus, the current tournament is open to any PBA member who also enters the World Series of Bowling.

For the 2009–10 season, the PBA World Championship was part of the World Series of Bowling held in Allen Park, Michigan, and was contested in a split format. The qualifying rounds of the tournament were contested August 31 – September 4, with the televised finals being broadcast live on ESPN December 13, 2009. The PBA's second World Series of Bowling in 2010 was contested in Las Vegas, Nevada, and was again used as qualifying for the 2010–11 PBA World Championship. This time, the 60-game qualifying scores for the five "animal pattern" championships held at the World Series were used to determine the 8-bowler TV field for the PBA World Championship finals. The World Championship finals were televised live over three consecutive days (January 14–16, 2011), a PBA first.

Currently (as of the 2026 WSOB XVII), combined scores from the 40 games of qualifying (10 games on each of four different "animal" oil patterns) determine the top one-third of the WSOB field that move on to the PBA World Championship Advancers round. After 10 more games on the Earl Anthony 42 oil pattern, which is named after the six-time winner of this event, the top 16 move on to the match play round. These 16 players then bowl 15 games of roundrobin head-to-head match play, plus one position round match. Total pinfall from all 50 qualifying games, plus the 16 match play games (including 30 bonus pins for head-to-head match play wins), determines the nine players that advance to the televised semifinals. The semifinals is a play-in round for the 5–9 seeds to determine the fifth bowler who will join the top four from match play in the televised finals. The Earl Anthony 42 oil pattern is also used for match play, semifinals and finals.

== World Champions ==
=== 2026 event ===
The 2026 PBA World Championship held qualifying and match play May 1–6 in Brooklyn Park, Minnesota. The live televised play-in round and stepladder finals were then held on June 13 in Allen Park, Michigan. The tournament had a $495,450 prize fund. The top 40 players cashed, with the champion earning $100,000.

A five-player stepladder format was used for the final round. Top-seeded E. J. Tackett defeated fifth seed Zach Wilkins in the final match, 188–181, to successfully defend his 2025 PBA World Championship title and gain an unprecedented four-peat in this event. This was Tackett's 28th PBA Tour title, eighth major, and the fifth World Championship title in his career.

Match #1
4	Kris Prather	192 (X, 9)
5	Zach Wilkins*	192 (X, X)

Match #2
3	Bill O'Neill	144
5	Zach Wilkins	205

Match #3
2	Chris Via	217
5	Zach Wilkins	235

Championship Match
1	E. J. Tackett	188
5	Zach Wilkins	181

- Prize Pool:

1. E. J. Tackett (Bluffton, Indiana) – $100,000
2. Zach Wilkins (Barrie, Ontario, Canada) – $60,000
3. Chris Via (Blacklick, Ohio) – $40,000
4. Bill O'Neill (Langhorne, Pennsylvania) – $30,000
5. Kris Prather (Plainfield, Illinois) – $25,000

- *Wilkins qualified as the No. 7 seed, but moved up to the No. 5 seed by winning his three matches in the play-in stepladder. In the 4–5 match, he defeated Kris Prather on the second ball of a sudden death roll-off.

=== Past winners ===
Season	Winner	Runner-up	Championship match score
1960	Don Carter	Ronnie Gaudern	237.17–227.24
1961	Dave Soutar	Morrie Oppenheim	212.02–208.19
1962	Carmen Salvino	Don Carter	193.29–193.10
1963	Billy Hardwick	Ray Bluth	13541–13288
1964	Bob Strampe	Ray Bluth (2)	13979–13721
1965	Dave Davis	Jerry McCoy	681–502
1966	Wayne Zahn	Nelson Burton Jr.	14006–13869
1967	Dave Davis (2)	Pete Tountas	216–191
1968	Wayne Zahn (2)	Nelson Burton Jr. (2)	14182–13741
1969	Mike McGrath	Bill Allen	13670–13605
1970	Mike McGrath (2)	Dave Davis	226–222
1971	Mike Limongello	Dave Davis (2)	207–202
1972	Johnny Guenther	Dick Ritger	12986–12889
1973	Earl Anthony	Sam Flanagan	212–189
1974	Earl Anthony (2)	Mark Roth	218–188
1975	Earl Anthony (3)	Jim Frazier	245–180
1976	Paul Colwell	Dave Davis (3)	191–191 (49-48 roll-off)
1977	Tommy Hudson	Jay Robinson	206–200
1978	Warren Nelson	Joseph Groskind	219–199
1979	Mike Aulby	Earl Anthony	245–217
1980	Johnny Petraglia	Gary Dickinson	235–223
1981	Earl Anthony (4)	Ernie Schlegel	242–237
1982	Earl Anthony (5)	Charlie Tapp	233–191
1983	Earl Anthony (6)	Mike Durbin	210–183
1984	Bob Chamberlain	Dan Eberl	219–191
1985	Mike Aulby (2)	Steve Cook	253–211
1986	Tom Crites	Mike Aulby	190–184
1987	Randy Pedersen	Amleto Monacelli	233–222
1988	Brian Voss	Todd Thompson	246–185
1989	Pete Weber	Dave Ferraro	221–216
1990	Jim Pencak	Chris Warren	223–214
1991	Mike Miller	Norm Duke	218–214
1992	Eric Forkel	Bob Vespi	217–133
1993	Ron Palombi Jr.	Eugene McCune	237–224
1994	Dave Traber	Dale Traber	196–187
1995	Scott Alexander	Wayne Webb	246–210
1996	Butch Soper	Walter Ray Williams Jr.	226–210
1997	Rick Steelsmith	Brian Voss	218–190
1998	Pete Weber (2)	David Ozio	277–236
1999	Tim Criss	Dave Arnold	238–161
2000	Norm Duke	Jason Couch	214–198
2001	Walter Ray Williams Jr.	Jeff Lizzi	258–204
2001–02	Doug Kent	Lonnie Waliczek	215–160
2002–03	Walter Ray Williams Jr. (2)	Brian Kretzer	226–204
2003–04	Tom Baker	Mika Koivuniemi	246–239
2004–05	Patrick Allen	Chris Loschetter	235–210
2005–06	Walter Ray Williams Jr. (3)	Pete Weber	236–213
2006–07	Doug Kent (2)	Chris Barnes	237–216
2007–08	Norm Duke (2)	Ryan Shafer	202–165
2008–09	Norm Duke (3)	Chris Barnes (2)	259–189
2009–10	Tom Smallwood	Wes Malott	244–228
2010–11	Chris Barnes	Bill O'Neill	267–237
2011–12	Osku Palermaa	Ryan Shafer (2)	203–177
2012–13+	Parker Bohn III	Jason Belmonte	254–227
2012–13+	Dominic Barrett	Sean Rash	238–235
2014	Mike Fagan	Wes Malott (2)	252–212
2015	Gary Faulkner Jr.	E. J. Tackett	216–178
2016	E. J. Tackett	Tom Smallwood	246–180
2017	Jason Belmonte	Jesper Svensson	238–225
2018	Tournament not held in 2018		
2019	Jason Belmonte (2)	Jakob Butturff	236–227
2020	Jason Belmonte (3)	Anthony Simonsen	213–190
2021	Tom Daugherty	Jakob Butturff (2)	263–257
2022	Kristopher Prather	Jason Sterner	237–237 (10–6 roll-off)
2023	E. J. Tackett (2)	Jason Belmonte (2)	254–247
2024	E. J. Tackett (3)	Matt Russo	225–194
2025	E. J. Tackett (4)	Jason Belmonte (3)	242–222
2026	E. J. Tackett (5)	Zach Wilkins	188–181

+ Due to the 2012–13 "Super Season" running from November 2012 to December 2013, there were two PBA World Championship events: one in November 2012 and one in November 2013.
