= Wes Malott =

American ten-pin bowler

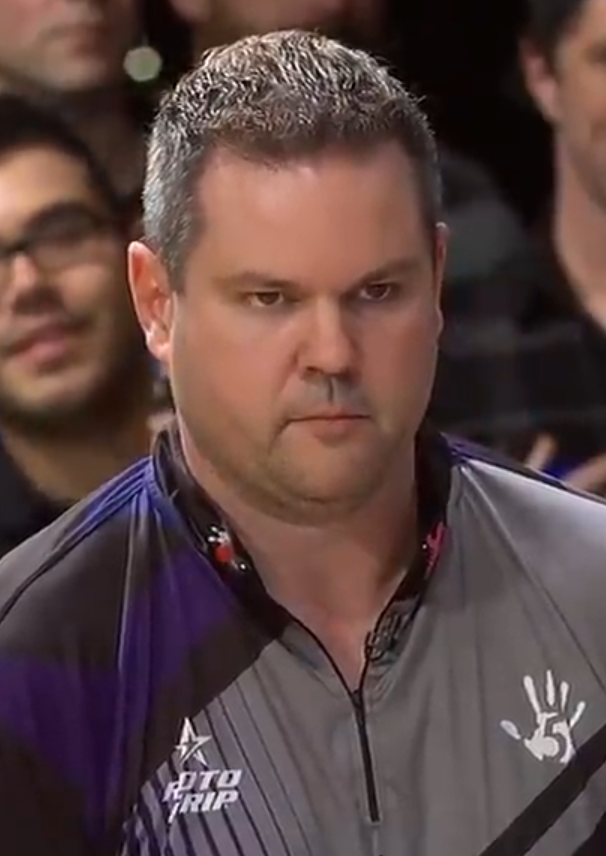
- Malott in 2019

Personal information
- Nickname: Big Nasty
- Born: Wesley Clint Malott; October 26, 1976 (age 49) Austin, Texas, U.S.
- Years active: 2004–present
- Height: 6 ft 5 in (196 cm)

Bowling Information
- Affiliation: PBA
- Rookie year: 2005
- Dominant hand: Right (cranker delivery)
- Wins: 10 PBA Tour (1 major); 18 PBA Regional Tour
- 300-games: 41
- Sponsors: Roto Grip, 3G shoes, Vise Grip inserts

Wesley Clint "Big Nasty" Malott (born October 26, 1976) is an American professional ten-pin bowler and member of the Professional Bowlers Association (PBA). Originally from Pflugerville, Texas, he now resides in Fort Wayne, Indiana. He has won ten PBA Tour titles, and was the 2008–09 Chris Schenkel PBA Player of the Year. He won his lone major championship at the 2012–13 U.S. Open, and has finished runner-up in five other PBA major tournaments. Malott also won the 2006–07 Showplace Lanes Megabucks Shootout, which was not a PBA Tour event. He won the non-title PBA King of Bowling event in 2009, and defended his King position eight consecutive times through 2018.

Malott also owns 18 PBA Regional Tour titles. Through 2019, his career PBA Tour earnings have topped $1.3 million (U.S.). He has rolled 41 perfect 300 games in PBA Tour events, and had two televised 300 games in the 2009 King of Bowling tournament. Wes is a Pro Staff member for Roto Grip bowling balls, 3G shoes and Vise Grips.

In January 2022, Malott was unanimously elected to the PBA Hall of Fame, and was inducted with the 2022 class on February 26.

== PBA career ==
After winning one title each in the 2005–06, 2006–07 and 2007–08 seasons, Malott had his big breakout in the 2008–09 season. In a close race, Malott won the 2008–09 PBA Player of the Year Award over Norm Duke (74 points to Duke's 70). In his finest season to date, Malott made nine TV finals appearances, won three times, and collected a career-high $174,680. He won the PBA's George Young High Average award with a season mark of 222.98.

At the 2009 PBA World Series of Bowling in Allen Park, MI, Malott made the TV finals in two of the seven events: the PBA Shark Championship and PBA World Championship, but failed to win either tournament. In the World Championship, he was denied his first major title when he was upset by newcomer Tom Smallwood, 244–228. Smallwood had been laid off from his automotive plant job in Michigan less than a year before defeating Malott for the championship.

Although Malott failed to win a tournament in the 2009–10 season (the first time he had been shut out since 2004–05), he did finish second on the Tour in average (221.33) and fifth in points, while making five TV finals appearances.

Malott won a title in the 2011–12 season in the Mark Roth-Marshall Holman Exempt Doubles Championship with partner Norm Duke.

In the 2012–13 season, he finished runner-up in the USBC Masters to Jason Belmonte. Later in the season, he got his revenge on Belmonte, defeating him in the final match of Bowling's U.S. Open in Columbus, Ohio for Wes' first major championship. He won his ninth PBA title later in the 2012–13 season, in the Cheetah Championship at the 2013 World Series of Bowling, marking the first time since 2008–09 that he won multiple titles in a single season. He also posted a career-high 228.09 average in Tour events.

Malott and partner Norm Duke won their second Mark Roth-Marshall Holman Doubles Championship in 2015. The win gave Malott ten PBA Tour titles, which qualified him for PBA Hall of Fame consideration.

On April 12, 2017, Malott won the PBA "King of the Hill" competition in Portland, Maine. This was a special, non-title event broadcast live on the PBA's Xtra Frame webcast service, held in conjunction with the PBA League and Mark Roth-Marshall Holman Doubles Championship during the same week in Portland.

Malott was the anchor bowler for the winning Portland Lumberjacks team in the 2019 PBA League tournament, and he won the Mark Roth League MVP award. Excluding a couple of meaningless tenth frame fill balls, Malott rolled 20 of 22 possible strikes over the three-day event (July 16–18). The Lumberjacks won the PBA League competition for a second straight season on September 30, 2020, with Malott winning his second straight Mark Roth MVP award. Since the event's inception in 2013, Malott is the first player to earn MVP honors in back-to-back seasons. At this same event, Malott won the PBA League All-Star Clash, a special event featuring one representative from each of the 12 PBA League teams. In the event broadcast on November 29, Malott won $25,000 for himself and $50,000 for his team.

During an interview by PBA commissioner Tom Clark during the 2022 PBA Players Championship qualifying rounds, Malott learned that Clark only set up the interview to inform Wes he was unanimously elected to the Professional Bowlers Association Hall of Fame. He was inducted as the only member of the 2022 class during a ceremony on February 26, 2022, the night before the PBA Tournament of Champions finals.

Malott ranked #12 on the PBA's 2025 "Best 25 PBA Players of the Last 25 Seasons" list. The ranking was based on a points system that took into account standard titles, major titles, top-five finishes and Player of the Year awards.

=== King of Bowling ===
Malott won all five of his matches to win the crown in ESPN2's made-for-TV "King of Bowling" event, which was broadcast over five weeks on a tape-delay basis in April–May 2009. Malott rolled 300 games in two of his five matches.

Since that inaugural event, the King of Bowling has taken the form of a challenge match, most often a best two-of-three, and has been held in conjunction with a regularly scheduled PBA Tour event. Malott's challenger was chosen via PBA fan vote.

Through 2018, Malott never lost the King of Bowling crown, winning his eighth crown defense against Jason Belmonte on February 6, 2018. This best-of-three match, which Malott won 2–0, was held at AMF Riviera Lanes prior to the start of the PBA Tournament of Champions. In previous King of Bowling events, Malott has beaten Tommy Jones, Belmonte and E. J. Tackett (in a three-way match), Parker Bohn III, Rhino Page, Walter Ray Williams Jr., Patrick Allen and Chris Barnes.

Malott was invited to defend his crown July 20–22, 2020 in Jupiter, Florida, at the PBA's six-episode King of the Lanes event broadcast on Fox Sports 1. He was defeated in his first King match on July 20 by his friend and doubles partner, Norm Duke.

== Career highlights ==
PBA Titles (majors in boldface)

1. 2005–06 – Mile High Classic (Lakewood, Colorado)
2. 2006–07 – Discover Card Windy City Classic (Vernon Hills, Illinois)
3. 2007–08 – Earl Anthony Medford Classic (Medford, Oregon)
4. 2008–09 – Carmen Salvino Scorpion Championship (Vernon Hills, Illinois)
5. 2008–09 – Bayer Earl Anthony Medford Classic (Medford, Oregon)
6. 2008–09 – Etonic Marathon Open (Indianapolis, Indiana)
7. 2011–12 – Mark Roth-Marshall Holman Exempt Doubles Championship w/Norm Duke (Las Vegas, Nevada)
8. **2012–13 – Lipton U.S. Open** (Columbus, Ohio)
9. 2012–13 – WSOB Cheetah Championship (Las Vegas, Nevada)
10. 2015 – Mark Roth-Marshall Holman PBA Doubles Championship w/Norm Duke (Indianapolis, Indiana)

Other top-3 finishes
2003–04 – 3rd, PBA World Championship
2004–05 – 3rd, PBA Banquet Open
2005–06 – 3rd, Greater Omaha Classic
2005–06 – 2nd, Tulsa Championship
2006–07 – 2nd, Motor City Classic
2006–07 – 1st, Showplace Lanes Megabucks Shootout (non-PBA title event)
2006–07 – 2nd, Ace Hardware Championship
2006–07 – 3rd, Earl Anthony Medford Classic
2006–07 – 2nd, U.S. Open
2007–08 – 2nd, Lake Country Indiana Classic
2007–08 – 2nd, Lumber Liquidators Championship
2008–09 – 1st, Dart Bowl ATX Crossover Doubles (non-PBA title event; included a Dutch 200 game)
2008–09 – 2nd, Lumber Liquidators Shark Championship
2008–09 – 3rd, National Bowling Stadium Championship
2008–09 – 3rd, Tournament of Champions
2008–09 – 2nd, Dydo Japan Cup
2008–09 – 1st, PBA King of Bowling (non-PBA title event; included 2 perfect games)
2009–10 – 2nd, PBA World Championship
2009–10 – 3rd, Don and Paula Carter Mixed Doubles Championship (with Shannon O'Keefe)
2010–11 – 3rd, PBA Chameleon Championship
2011–12 – 2nd, Carmen Salvino Classic
2012–13 – 2nd, USBC Masters
2012–13 – 2nd, Don Carter Classic
2014 – 2nd, Barbasol Tournament of Champions
2014 – 2nd, PBA World Championship
2016 – 3rd, USBC Masters
2016 – 2nd, PBA Fall Swing Badger Open
2016 – 3rd, PBA Detroit Open
2017 – 3rd, U.S. Open
2019 – 3rd, Go Bowling! PBA Indianapolis Open

== Career statistics ==
Statistics are through the last complete PBA season.

Season	Events	Cashes	Match Play	CRA+	PBA Titles	Average	Earnings ($)
2002–03	7	6	2	0	0	210.88	9,500
2003–04	18	15	9	1	0	217.53	45,850
2004–05	19	19	13	1	0	219.55	56,675
2005–06	22	22	18	4	1	221.83	130,270
2006–07	20	20	17	6	1	226.49	148,425
2007–08	18	18	15	6	1	223.77	108,900
2008–09	20	18	16	9	3	222.98	174,680
2009–10	18	16	13	5	0	221.33	85,570
2010–11	12	9	5	2	0	215.96	33,690
2011–12	13	10	7	2	1	224.62	39,380
2012–13	19	14	8	6	2	228.09	142,906
2014	12	8	4	2	0	225.15	85,803
2015	18	10	5	1	1	220.28	55,372
2016	22	14	8	3	0	221.19	64,300
2017	15	10	5	2	0	221.59	50,183
2018	15	10	4	1	0	214.55	28,675
2019	24	13	7	4	0	214.70	59,600
2020	12	6	4	0	0	--	58,500

+CRA = Championship Round Appearances

== Personal ==
Wes is married to wife Sarah, and they now reside in Fort Wayne, IN.

Wes has three sons (Jordan, Camden and Graham French) and two daughters (Brooke and Maggie French). Jordan Malott, aged 15, bowled in the PBA Regional Tour Houston Emerald Bowl Southwest Challenge on August 18, 2019, and finished in third place.

== Sources ==
- http://www.pba.com, official website of the Professional Bowlers Association and the PBA Tour
