= Lumber Liquidators =

Hardwood flooring retailer

- Formerly: Lumber Liquidators (1994-2020; 2024-present); LL Flooring (2020–2024)
- Company type: Subsidiary
- Industry: Retailing
- Founded: 1994 (32 years ago) in Stoughton, Massachusetts, U.S.
- Founder: Tom Sullivan
- Headquarters: Lawrenceburg, Tennessee
- Number of locations: 410 (Dec. 2020)
- Area served: United States, Canada
- Key people: Tom Sullivan (Chairman) Jason Delves (CEO)
- Revenue: ▲US$ 1.098 billion (2020)
- Operating income: ▲US$ 56.28 million (2020)
- Net income: ▲US$ 61.43 million (2020)
- Total assets: ▲US$ 674.3 million (2020)
- Total equity: ▲US$ 227.6 million (2020)
- Number of employees: 2,230 (2020)
- Parent: F9 Investments (2024-present)
- Website: www.lumberliquidators.com

Lumber Liquidators is an American retailer of hard-surface flooring including hardwood, laminate, vinyl plank, tile, bamboo and cork, as well as flooring tools and accessories. The company filed for Chapter 11 bankruptcy on August 11, 2024, and was able to avoid liquidation 3 months later after a last minute deal to be acquired by original founder Tom Sullivan.

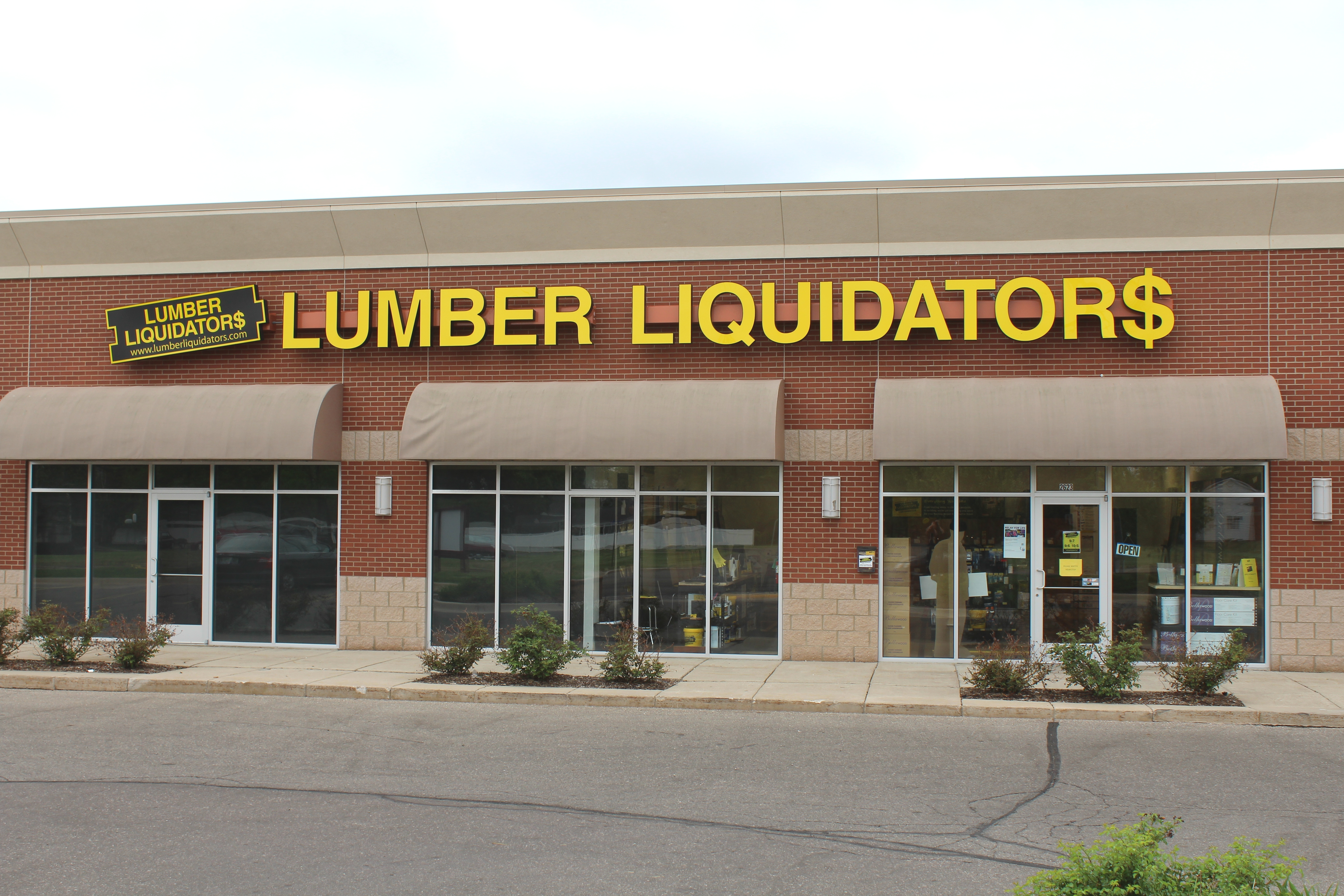
Lumber Liquidators store, Ypsilanti, Michigan

== History ==
=== Founding ===
Lumber Liquidators was started in 1994 by Tom Sullivan, a building contractor who began purchasing excess wood from other companies. He then resold the wood from the back of a trucking firm's yard in Stoughton, Massachusetts. Three years later in 1996, the company found their niche market in hardwood flooring. On January 5, 1996, the company's first store opened in West Roxbury, Massachusetts, and sold 150 square feet of floors on the first day. By August of that year, they opened up a second store in Hartford, Connecticut.

=== Expansion ===
The company has grown to be one of the largest retailers of hardwood flooring in the United States. It expanded to more than 375 Lumber Liquidators stores with over 1,000 employees in 47 states and Canada. It also launched online e-commerce, catalogs, and its Virginia call center. By the end of 2018 the company was operating over 415 stores across North America.

The company's CEO is Jason Delves. Previous CEO was Charles Tyson until F9 Inv purchased LL from bankruptcy court, prior to bankruptcy the firm was listed and traded as LL on the New York Stock Exchange.

In 2009, Lumber Liquidators began sponsoring Scripps' HGTV, DIY Network and ABC's Extreme Makeover: Home Edition.

The company expanded into Canada in the fourth quarter of 2010. The expansion plan was to add 36 to 40 stores.

In April 2020, the company publicly rebranded itself, changing its name to LL Flooring. The corporate entity name was changed to LL Flooring Holdings, Inc. effective January 1, 2022.

=== Bankruptcy, planned liquidation and reverted rebrand ===
In July 2024, LL Flooring warned that it may file for Chapter 11 bankruptcy within the coming weeks due to slow sales and a high decline in home renovation, as the company warned it may run out of money within the third quarter. As a result, the company's stock fell nearly 20% to around 92 cents per share. On August 11, 2024, LL Flooring filed for Chapter 11 bankruptcy protection in Delaware. The company planned to pursue a sale of all of its assets and would close 94 locations as part of the sale.

On September 3, 2024, LL Flooring announced that it would shut down its operations and close all 424 locations nationwide after being unable to come to a stalking horse agreement with bidders. However, on September 9, the company reached a last-minute agreement with F9 Investments, a private-equity firm led by the company's founder Thomas Sullivan. F9 Investments received court approval to acquire the company on September 16. The remaining locations rebranded back to Lumber Liquidators by October 2024.

=== Controversies ===
A 2013 report by the Environmental Investigation Agency revealed that Lumber Liquidators' indiscriminate and poor sourcing practices resulted in the destruction of critically endangered tiger habitats and forests.

Further investigation led to the conviction of a Russian supplier in 2014. Shortly after the conviction, Lumber Liquidators lost about 20% in stock value for potential violation of the Lacey Act.

During 2015, the company was the subject of a 60 Minutes report. The broadcast accused the company of selling an unsafe type of Chinese-made laminate flooring that contained dangerous levels of the carcinogen formaldehyde that exceeded emissions standards. Hedge fund manager Whitney Tilson had shorted the company's stock after it more than doubled in a year, and paid $5,000 to test three pieces of wood; he said that formaldehyde levels in the wood he tested were two to six times the California Air Resources Board limits. Shares of the company dropped 25% the day after the broadcast; eight months later it was down 75%. The company ultimately paid a $33 million penalty.

A number of class action lawsuits were filed by customers, due to the formaldehyde issue and other customer service issues.

On June 16, 2015, Lumber Liquidators announced the "unexpected" resignation of its CEO, Robert Lynch. It also announced the termination of its Chief Merchandising Officer, William Schlegel. It also declared it would discontinue the sale of laminate flooring products manufactured in China.

The company's founder, Tom Sullivan, served as interim CEO following the resignation. He was replaced in November 2015 by John Presley.

On October 22, 2015, Lumber Liquidators pleaded guilty in federal court to the illegal importation of hardwood flooring. In February 2016, a federal judge sentenced the company to $13.15 million in penalties, consisting of $7.8 million in criminal fines, $3.15 million in civil forfeiture, $1 million in criminal forfeiture, and $1.2 million to conservation organizations. It was the largest financial penalty ever issued for violating the Lacey Act of 1900.
