= U.S. Open (bowling) =

Bowling tournament

The U.S. Open is one of the five major tournaments in the Professional Bowlers Association, currently run jointly by the United States Bowling Congress (USBC) and Bowling Proprietors Association of America (BPAA). Despite its status as a PBA Tour major, the tournament is open to qualifying amateurs as well as PBA members. The U.S. Open is considered one of the most difficult tournaments to bowl in today, due to its long format (56 games from opening qualifying through the match play rounds; 64 games if a player from the pre-tournament qualifier makes it through) and demanding oil patterns, which differ from most oil patterns the PBA employs.

== Tournament history ==
With the exception of 1997 and 2014, the U.S. Open has been held in some form every year since 1942 (84 years ago), the first event won by Detroit's John "The General" Crimmins. Prior to 1971, this event was known as the BPAA All-Star. In its early years, the BPAA All-Star was a 100-game tournament. Andy Varipapa is notable for winning back-to-back BPAA All-Star titles in 1947 and 1948, the second coming at age 57, which makes him this tournament's oldest winner. BPAA All-Star winners in the PBA era (1959–1970) were initially not credited with PBA titles for their victories. A rule change in 2008, however, retroactively awarded titles to the winners if they were PBA members at the time of their victories. Because the 1959 BPAA All-Star occurred before the PBA's debut, Harry Smith (1960) earned the first PBA title in a BPAA All-Star event.

The first modern-day U.S. Open tournament in the PBA took place in 1971 and was won by Mike Limongello. With five wins, Pete Weber holds the most U.S. Open trophies of all time, one more than Dick Weber (Pete's father) and Don Carter. Pete Weber is also the only player to win a U.S. Open title in four different decades (1988, 1991, 2003-04, 2006-07 and 2011-12). The only player to successfully defend a modern day U.S. Open title was Dave Husted, who won the event in 1995 and 1996. Since then, only two bowlers have come close to joining Husted. After winning in 2007-08, Norm Duke finished runner-up to Mike Scroggins in 2008-09. Scroggins then finished runner-up to Bill O'Neill in 2009-10. Since 1971, only eight bowlers have won multiple U.S. Open titles:

1. Pete Weber - 5 titles (1988, 1992, 2003-04, 2006-07, 2011-12)
2. Dave Husted - 3 titles (1982, 1995, 1996)
T3. Marshall Holman - 2 titles (1981, 1985)
T3. Del Ballard Jr. - 2 titles (1987, 1993)
T3. Walter Ray Williams Jr. - 2 titles (1998, 2002-03)
T3. Norm Duke - 2 titles (2007-08, 2010-11)
T3. François Lavoie - 2 titles (2016, 2019)
T3. E.J. Tackett - 2 titles (2023, 2025)

There has only been one time in modern-day U.S. Open tournament history that two former U.S. Open champions met in a final. In the 2010-11 U.S. Open Championship match, 2001-02 winner Mika Koivuniemi needed a spare and 9 pins in the tenth frame to defeat 2007-08 winner Norm Duke, but missed the 10-pin to the right and Duke would win 225 to 216. This would also be the only time two bowlers met in multiple U.S. Open Finals as Duke had defeated Koivuniemi 224 to 216 in the 2007-08 Final.

The 1987 U.S. Open, sponsored by Seagram Wine Coolers, offered a then-record total purse of $500,000, and was the first PBA tournament to award a $100,000 first prize (won by Del Ballard Jr.).

Unable to find viable sponsorship, the U.S. Open was canceled for 2014, amid speculation that the tournament may not return at all. However, the USBC and BPAA later reached a three-year agreement that brought the tournament back for 2015, 2016 and 2017. The USBC and BPAA secured Bowlmor AMF, at the time the largest operator of bowling centers in the world, as the title sponsor for 2015. The 2015 tournament took place November 2–8 in Garland, Texas.

Beginning in 2017 with the U.S. Open held at Flamingo Bowl in Liverpool, New York, the tournament instituted a partial invitational field for the first time. Among those invited are top money leaders among PBA members, top performers from a variety of USBC events, members of Team USA and Junior Team USA, winners of the past ten U.S. Opens, the last three winners from each of the PBA's other major championships, and winners of the current year PBA Regional Tour U.S. Open qualifier tournaments. The "open" portion of the tournament is actually a pre-tournament qualifier (PTQ) with a maximum of 80 entries. Top finishers from the eight-game PTQ then join all those who accepted invitations to round out the starting field of 144 players. The 2018 event had 116 invitational entries and only 28 open spots available via the PTQ. In 2019, only 91 invitees entered the tournament, so 53 open spots were filled from the PTQ.

== Format ==
Starting in 2020, the starting field has been limited to only 108 players. After the starting field is determined, players bowl 24 qualifying games in three 8-game blocks on three different oil patterns. The top 36 in pinfall advance to the cashers round for 8 more games on a fourth oil pattern. The top 24 players after the cashers round then bowl 24 round-robin, head-to-head match play games, all on "pattern four" (which was 43 feet in 2026). In the match play round, players are awarded actual pinfall plus 30 bonus pins for every match won (15 bonus pins each in the case of a tie). The top five after the match play round advance to the televised championship finals, which is on the same oil pattern as match play.

== Current champion ==
=== 2026 Event ===
The 2026 U.S. Open was held at Woodland Bowl in Indianapolis, Indiana on March 3–8, with a pre-tournament qualifier (PTQ) on March 1. The tournament had a field of 108 players (after PTQ players added) and a prize fund of $299,750, with a $100,000 top prize. Patrick Dombrowski, the #2 seed, won his first PBA Tour title and first major. After eliminating former U.S. Open winner Chris Via in the semifinal match, Dombrowski defeated top seed Anthony Simonsen, another previous U.S. Open winner, in the final match, 197–195.

Match #1
4	Tim Foy Jr.	226
5	Andrew Anderson	250

Match #2
3	Chris Via	246
5	Andrew Anderson	159

Match #3
2	Patrick Dombrowski	248
3	Chris Via	211

Title match
1	Anthony Simonsen	195
2	Patrick Dombrowski	197

- Prize Pool:

1. Patrick Dombrowski (Parma, Ohio) – $100,000
2. Anthony Simonsen (Las Vegas, Nevada) – $50,000
3. Chris Via (Blacklick, Ohio) – $25,000
4. Andrew Anderson (Holly, Michigan) – $15,000
5. Tim Foy Jr. (Seaford, Delaware) – $10,000

== Past champions ==
=== U.S. Open champions ===
Year	Winner	Runner-up	Championship match score
1971	Mike Limongello	Teata Semiz	194–186
1972	Don Johnson	George Pappas	233–224
1973	Mike McGrath	Earl Anthony	234–222
1974	Larry Laub	Dave Davis	258–237
1975	Steve Neff	Paul Colwell	279–217
1976	Paul Moser	Jim Frazier	226–195
1977	Johnny Petraglia	Bill Spigner	279–232
1978	Nelson Burton Jr.	Jeff Mattingly	204–201
1979	Joe Berardi	Earl Anthony (2)	232–195
1980	Steve Martin	Earl Anthony (3)	248–222
1981	Marshall Holman	Mark Roth	200–179
1982	Dave Husted	Gil Sliker	255–180
1983	Gary Dickinson	Steve Neff	214–202
1984	Mark Roth	Guppy Troup	244–237
1985	Marshall Holman (2)	Wayne Webb	233–205
1986	Steve Cook	Frank Ellenburg	245–211
1987	Del Ballard Jr.	Pete Weber	247–209
1988	Pete Weber	Marshall Holman	203–171
1989	Mike Aulby	Jim Pencak	195–178
1990	Ron Palombi Jr.	Amleto Monacelli	269–205
1991	Pete Weber (2)	Mark Thayer	289–184
1992	Robert Lawrence	Scott Devers	226–221
1993	Del Ballard Jr. (2)	Walter Ray Williams Jr.	237–193
1994	Justin Hromek	Parker Bohn III	267–230
1995	Dave Husted (2)	Paul Koehler	266–245
1996	Dave Husted (3)	George Brooks	216–214
1997	Not held		
1998	Walter Ray Williams Jr.	Tim Criss	221–189
1999	Bob Learn Jr.	Jason Couch	231–215
2000	Robert Smith	Norm Duke	202–201
2001–02	Mika Koivuniemi	Patrick Healey, Jr.	247–182
2002–03	Walter Ray Williams Jr. (2)	Michael Haugen Jr.	236–198
2003–04	Pete Weber (3)	Brian Voss	231–178
2004–05	Chris Barnes	Patrick Allen	213–212
2005–06	Tommy Jones	Ryan Shafer	237–223
2006–07	Pete Weber (4)	Wes Malott	210–204
2007–08	Norm Duke	Mika Koivuniemi	224–216
2008–09	Mike Scroggins	Norm Duke (2)	191–173
2009–10	Bill O'Neill	Mike Scroggins	267–207
2010–11	Norm Duke (2)	Mika Koivuniemi (2)	225–216
2011–12	Pete Weber (5)	Mike Fagan	215–214
2012–13	Wes Malott	Jason Belmonte	214–156
2014	Not held		
2015	Ryan Ciminelli	Dominic Barrett	236–223
2016	François Lavoie	Marshall Kent	228–194
2017	Rhino Page	Jakob Butturff	256–222
2018	Dominic Barrett	Jakob Butturff (2)	207–206
2019	François Lavoie (2)	Sean Rash	221–172
2020	Jason Belmonte	Anthony Simonsen	226–201
2021	Chris Via	Jakob Butturff (3)	214–213
2022	Anthony Simonsen	E. J. Tackett	232–165
2023	E. J. Tackett	Kyle Troup	221–208
2024	Kyle Troup	Anthony Simonsen (2)	223–181
2025	E. J. Tackett (2)	Andrew Anderson	238–184
2026	Patrick Dombrowski	Anthony Simonsen (3)	197–195

=== BPAA All-Star champions ===
- 1942 – John Crimmins
- 1943 – Connie Schwoegler
- 1944 – Ned Day
- 1945 – Buddy Bomar
- 1946 – Joe Wilman
- 1947 – Andy Varipapa
- 1948 – Andy Varipapa (2)
- 1949 – Connie Schwoegler (2)
- 1950 – Junie McMahon
- 1951 – Dick Hoover
- 1952 – Junie McMahon (2)
- 1953 – Don Carter
- 1954 – Don Carter (2)
- 1955 – Steve Nagy
- 1956 – Bill Lilliard
- 1957 – Don Carter (3)
- 1958 – Don Carter (4)
- 1959 – Billy Welu
- 1960 – Harry Smith
- 1961 – Bill Tucker
- 1962 – Dick Weber
- 1963 – Dick Weber (2)
- 1964 – Bob Strampe
- 1965 – Dick Weber (3)
- 1966 – Dick Weber (4)
- 1967 – Les Schissler
- 1968 - Jim Stefanich
- 1969 – Billy Hardwick
- 1970 – Bobby Cooper

== U.S. Open oil pattern ==
The U.S. Open featured what PBA.com describes as "the toughest lane oil design in all of bowling." The pattern is considered "flat," meaning equal amounts of oil are applied to every lane board. (A typical lane condition allows more oil in the middle section of lane boards, and lesser amounts on the outer boards.)

Many claim the oil pattern was responsible for the lack of left-handed winners in this tournament, because there isn't enough ball traffic on the left side to create a "track area." When Mike Scroggins won the 2009 event in North Brunswick, New Jersey, he became the first left-hander in 20 years (Mike Aulby, 1989) to earn a U.S. Open title. Aulby's win was on an oil pattern where oil was applied more heavily on the outer boards (that is, those closest to the gutters), to the point where the outer parts of the lanes were effectively unplayable. In all, left-handers accounted for six victories (McGrath [1973], Moser [1976], Petraglia [1977], Cook [1986], Aulby [1989], and Scroggins [2009-10]) and nine runner-up finishes (Anthony [1973, 1979, 1980], Davis [1974], Devers [1992], Bohn [1994], Couch [1999], Allen [2004-05], Scroggins [2009-10]) at the U.S. Open since 1971. It was also the only major title that left-hander and 43-time titlist Earl Anthony never won in his career, though he did finish runner-up three times. In recent years, lefty Jakob Butturff joined Anthony as the only 3-time runner-ups [2017, 2018, 2021] with no titles. Additionally, Anthony and Butturff are the only two bowlers to finish runner-up and in back-to-back years. The two most recent lefties to win the U.S. Open titles were Ryan Ciminelli [2015] and Rhino Page [2017]. In the 2017 U.S. Open Championship match, Page defeated Butturff, and it was the first time two lefties met in a U.S. Open final since McGrath defeated Anthony in the 1973 U.S. Open Championship match; Butturff and Anthony would both bowl 222.

== See also ==
- U.S. Women's Open
