= Chris Barnes (bowler) =

American professional bowler (born 1970)

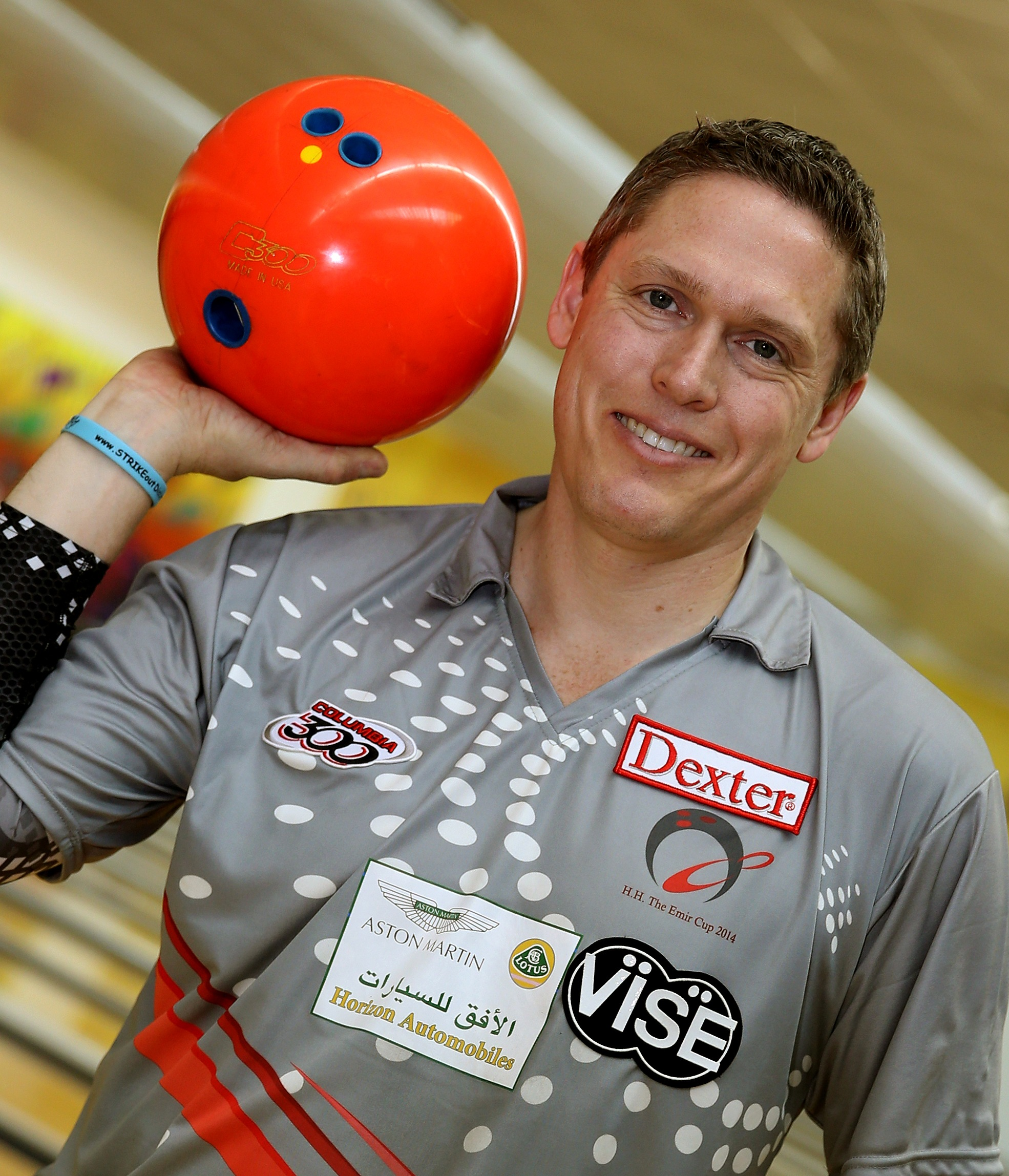
- Barnes in 2014

Personal information
- Born: February 25, 1970 (age 56) Topeka, Kansas, U.S.
- Years active: 1989–present
- Height: 6 ft 0 in (1.83 m)
- Spouse: Lynda Barnes

Bowling Information
- Affiliation: Professional Bowlers Association (PBA)
- Rookie year: 1998
- Dominant hand: Right
- Wins: 19 PBA Tour (3 majors); 10 PBA50 Tour (3 majors); 29 PBA Regional Tour; 6 PBA50 Regional Tour; 2007–08 PBA Player of the Year; 2026 PBA50 Player of the Year
- 300-games: 55
- Sponsors: 900 Global, Vise Grips, 3G

Chris Barnes (born February 25, 1970) is an American professional bowler and member of the Professional Bowlers Association (PBA), who currently competes on the PBA50 Tour while bowling part-time on the regular PBA Tour. He has also competed internationally as a member of Team USA.

Barnes, a right-handed bowler, was one of the leading professionals on the PBA Tour, where he won 19 titles and over $2.5 million (U.S.) in total prize money during his 28-year career. He has earned at least $100,000 in 14 PBA seasons, including 12 consecutive seasons (1999 through 2010–11). He won the PBA Rookie of the Year Award in 1998 and earned PBA Player of the Year honors in the 2007–08 season. At the time, this made him only the third bowler in PBA history to win both Rookie of the Year and Player of the Year honors in a career, after Mike Aulby and Tommy Jones. Jason Belmonte and E. J. Tackett have since joined that group. Barnes is one of only nine players in PBA history to earn a career "triple crown" (accomplished by winning the U.S. Open, PBA World Championship and PBA Tournament of Champions majors). On October 18, 2017, the PBA announced that Barnes had been voted into the PBA Hall of Fame; he was inducted with the 2018 class.

Barnes has rolled multiple perfect 300 games in PBA competition, including the 22nd nationally televised 300 game in a 2012 broadcast of the PBA WSOB Shark Open. He has also won ten PBA50 titles (three majors), 29 PBA Regional Tour titles, and six PBA50 Regional Tour titles. He was named PBA50 Player of the Year for the 2026 season.

Barnes is a pro staffer for 900 Global, Vise Grips and 3G shoes.

== Personal life ==
Chris has been married to USBC Hall of Famer Lynda Barnes (née Norry) since 1999. Lynda is an accomplished professional bowler in her own right who has represented the United States in international competition as a longtime member of Team USA, and has also bowled for Senior Team USA. She is also a two-time winner of the USBC Queens and won the 2008 USBC Clash of the Champions tournament.

The Barnes family lives in Denton, Texas. The Barnes' twin sons, Troy and Ryan, were born in May, 2002. Ryan bowled for his father's alma mater, Wichita State University from 2020 through 2024. In his senior year, Ryan Barnes received a commissioner's exemption to compete in the PBA Players Championship, held that year at Bowlero Northrock in Wichita, Kansas. He made the televised finals as the #4 seed, and finished in third place.

Upon the conclusion of his collegiate career, Ryan joined the PBA and qualified as an exempt player for the 2025 season. He went on to set a PBA rookie earnings record with $113,502 and won the PBA Rookie of the Year award. Chris and Ryan are the only father-and-son duo to each be named PBA Rookie of the Year. In November 2025, Ryan won his first PBA Regional title. Ryan is also a current member of Team USA.

== Career achievements ==
=== Amateur career ===
Barnes attended Topeka High School, and then bowled collegiately at Wichita State University, where he earned a Bachelor of Arts degree in Business Management. He is a 16-time member of Team USA (1994–1998 and 2008–2018), and has also captained the US team in the Weber Cup.

=== PBA and World Bowling Tours ===
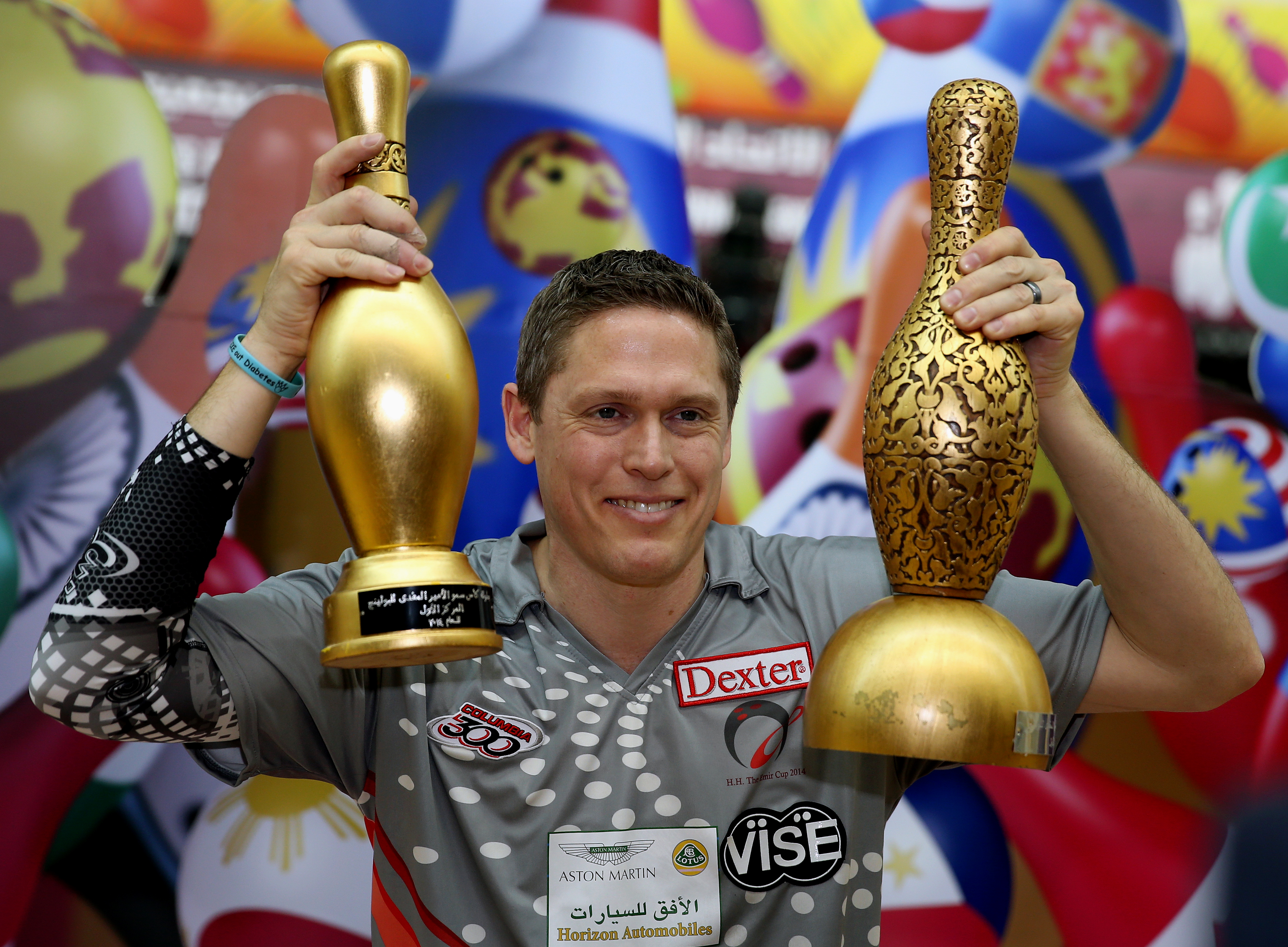
Barnes after winning the 2014 Emir's Cup in Doha

Barnes currently owns 19 career PBA Tour titles, placing him 18th all-time. His titles include the 62nd U.S. Open, the 2006 Dexter Tournament of Champions and the 2011 PBA World Championship. Winning these three majors makes him just one of nine PBA players to have earned a career "triple crown." He had won at least one title in eight consecutive seasons, before being shut out in the 2009–10 season despite four TV Finals appearances. Barnes only needs a USBC Masters title to complete a career "grand slam." He has qualified as the #1 seed in the Masters three times, but has yet to win it. Barnes also owns 29 PBA Regional titles through 2025.

In the 2004–05 season, Barnes posted career highs in average (226.69) and earnings ($194,300) while winning his first major title at the 2005 U.S. Open.

He also won the first two PBA Motel 6 Roll to Riches tournaments in 2005 and 2006, which included a winner-take-all grand prize of $200,000. At the time, these were the two largest prize checks in the history of televised bowling, but the earnings do not count toward PBA totals. The 2006 tournament was held in Lewisville, Texas, a mere eight miles from his residence. Also in 2006, Barnes won the World Tenpin Masters tournament, a non-PBA event that was held in Barnsley, England.

Barnes was the fastest player to reach $1,000,000 in career earnings, reaching that mark in 220 events, easily eclipsing the previous record of 253 events held by Pete Weber and Jason Couch. This record has since been bested by Australian Jason Belmonte, who reached the $1,000,000 earnings mark in only 131 events. Barnes eclipsed the $1.5 million mark in total PBA tour earnings during the 2007–08 season. He was ranked #26 on the PBA's 2008 list of "50 Greatest Players of the last 50 years."

Barnes along with his wife participated in the 2008 and 2009 USBC Clash of Champions, a special televised event on CBS. Lynda won the event in 2008, defeating Sean Rash by a 258–237 score in the championship match. The following year, it was Chris who advanced to the championship finals, winning the tournament over Rebekah Diers, 257–207. He and Lynda are the only two players to win the USBC Clash of Champions.

Barnes bowled the PBA's 22nd-ever televised 300 game in a semifinal match of the 2011 GEICO Shark Open at the PBA World Series of Bowling (broadcast March 4, 2012).

Barnes won the 2014 QubicaAMF World Cup, and he achieved a televised 300 game in the semifinals before defeating Germany's Tobias Börding in the two-game final, 269–248 and 231–216. He would roll another 300 game in the semifinals of the 2015 DHC PBA Japan Invitational, which was broadcast live on Japanese television as well as on the PBA's Xtra Frame webcast service. Barnes won a 5 million Yen ($43,032 USD) bonus for the 300 game in that tournament, in addition to the 5 million Yen he also won for winning the tournament itself.

On September 30, 2015, Barnes announced he would undergo surgery to repair a herniated disc in his back, forcing him to withdraw from the PBA Fall Classic in Las Vegas, NV, and putting his participation in the December 2015 PBA World Series of Bowling in doubt. The surgery is the same procedure that was done to Dallas Cowboys quarterback Tony Romo, and was performed by the same doctor.

On November 20, 2018, Barnes was voted by his peers to receive the PBA Tony Reyes Community Service Award. Since 2005, Chris and wife Lynda have hosted an annual Barnes Thanksgiving Classic youth scholarship tournament in the Dallas area.

Barnes ranked #4 on the PBA's 2025 "Best 25 PBA Players of the Last 25 Seasons" list. The ranking was based on a points system that took into account standard titles, major titles, top-five finishes and Player of the Year awards. Barnes led all bowlers in the 21st century with 81 standard event top-five finishes and 30 runner-up finishes, while ranking second with 100 top-five finishes overall (including major events).

On April 24, 2026, after missing the match play cut at the PBA Tournament of Champions, Barnes wrote on his Facebook page: "Yesterday I threw my last shot as a full time touring member on the 'kids' tour. While somewhat sad in a few ways, I really am just grateful for 28 seasons of experiences that would've been incomparable to any other life I could have had." He will still continue to compete in PBA50 and Regional Tour events.

=== PBA50 Tour ===
Barnes joined the PBA50 Tour (for players 50 years and older) in 2020, but the season was cancelled due to the COVID-19 pandemic. In his fourth event of the 2021 season on June 30, Barnes won his first PBA50 Tour title at the PBA50 Cup major in Lubbock, Texas.

Barnes captured three PBA50 titles in 2022, at the Granville Financial Open in Aberdeen, North Carolina, David Small's Championship Lanes Open in Anderson, Indiana, and David Small's JAX60 Open in Jackson, Michigan.

On July 23, 2023, Barnes won his fifth PBA50 Tour title and second PBA50 major at the PBA50 World Championship, the crowning event of the inaugural PBA50 World Series of Bowling held in Jackson, Michigan. His sixth PBA50 Tour title was again earned in Jackson, MI at the 2024 PBA50 Ballard Championship.

Barnes won two more titles in the 2025 PBA50 Tour season. He won the PBA50 South Shore Classic in (Hammond, Indiana) on July 26, and also won the PBA50 Holman Championship on July 17 at the PBA50 World Series of Bowling III in Jackson, Michigan.

On June 14, 2026, Barnes won the PBA50 FireLake Classic in Shawnee, Oklahoma for his ninth PBA50 Tour title. On August 8, he won the Petraglia BVL PBA50 Tournament of Champions for his second title of the season, tenth PBA50 title overall, and third PBA50 major. By winning, he earned enough points to claim 2026 PBA Player of the Year honors.

=== Hall of Fame ===
On October 18, 2017, the PBA announced that Barnes had been voted into the PBA Hall of Fame. He was officially inducted on February 17, 2018, as part of the PBA's 60th Anniversary festivities in Indianapolis.

== PBA titles ==
=== PBA Tour ===
Major championships are in bold text.

1. 1999 Flagship Open (Erie, Pennsylvania)
2. 1999 PBA Oregon Open (Portland, Oregon)
3. 2001 PBA Greater Nashville Open (Hendersonville, Tennessee)
4. 2003 Days Inn Open (Dallas, Texas)
5. 2003 Oranamin C Japan Cup (Tokyo, Japan)
6. **2005 U.S. Open** (North Brunswick, New Jersey)
7. **2006 Dexter Tournament of Champions** (Uncasville, Connecticut)
8. 2007 GEICO Classic (Irving, Texas)
9. 2008 Bayer Classic (El Paso, Texas)
10. 2008 Don Johnson Buckeye State Classic (Columbus, Ohio)
11. 2009 Don Johnson Buckeye State Eliminator Championship (Columbus, Ohio)
12. 2009 Go RVing Match Play Championship (Norwich, Connecticut)
13. **2010 PBA World Championship** (Las Vegas, Nevada)
14. 2012 Columbia 300 Vienna Open (Vienna, Austria)
15. 2013 Lucas Oil PBA Milwaukee Open (Milwaukee, Wisconsin)
16. 2013 WSOB Viper Championship (Las Vegas, Nevada)
17. 2014 Emir Cup (Doha, Qatar)
18. 2015 DHC Japan Invitational (Tokyo, Japan)
19. 2018 PBA Xtra Frame Lubbock Sports Open (Lubbock, Texas)

=== PBA50 Tour ===
1. **2021 PBA50 Cup** (Lubbock, Texas)
2. 2022 PBA50 Granville Financial Open (Aberdeen, North Carolina)
3. 2022 PBA50 David Small's Championship Lanes Open (Anderson, Indiana)
4. 2022 PBA50 David Small's JAX60 Open (Jackson, Michigan)
5. **2023 PBA50 World Championship** (Jackson, Michigan)
6. 2024 PBA50 Ballard Championship (Jackson, Michigan)
7. 2025 PBA50 South Shore Classic (Hammond, Indiana)
8. 2025 PBA50 Holman Championship (Jackson, Michigan)
9. 2026 PBA50 FireLake Classic (Shawnee, Oklahoma)
10. **2026 Petraglia BVL PBA50 Tournament of Champions** (Morgantown, West Virginia)

=== Non-title wins ===
1. 2005 Motel 6 Roll to Riches
2. 2006 Motel 6 Roll to Riches
3. 2006 World Tenpin Masters
4. 2009 USBC Clash of the Champions
5. 2014 QubicaAMF World Cup

== Difficulties in televised finals ==
Barnes has often struggled or been the victim of bad breaks in the live televised finals of many tournaments. His 19 titles have come in 87 championship round appearances, and he has finished runner-up 30 times. In the 2000 season alone, he made 12 TV finals without winning a title—to date the most season TV finals appearances without a victory in PBA Tour history.

On two occasions, Barnes has lost a match in a PBA major by a single pin:

- In January 2008, he faced Michael Haugen Jr. in the finals of the PBA Tournament of Champions in Las Vegas. Through six frames, Barnes held a 53-pin lead over his competitor, and seemed to have the match well in hand. Up by 41 pins in the ninth, Barnes left the 10-pin standing on his first throw and was expected to make the spare. To everyone’s surprise, Barnes missed the 10 pin leaving an open frame. Haugen, who had strikes in his previous two frames, struck in the ninth to cut the lead to 19. Haugen went on to throw two strikes and 9 pins in the final frame, forcing Barnes to throw two strikes and one pin in the last frame to win. He left the 2-pin and spared in the tenth, and needed a strike on his final throw to force a roll-off. This time he left the 4-pin standing to give Haugen his first career major victory, 215–214.
- In April 2009, Barnes qualified as the #2 seed in the U.S. Open. A title in this tournament would have given him his second straight Player of the Year award. In the semifinal match against Mike Scroggins, Barnes needed a strike on the first ball and six pins on the second ball in the 10th frame to move on to the title match. On what appeared to be a clean pocket hit, however, he left a single 8-pin standing. After making the spare, he still could have forced a sudden-death roll-off by striking on his final shot. This time, he left a single 10-pin, giving Scroggins a 200–199 victory.

In January 2010, Barnes was the #1 seed in the finals of the 2010 PBA Tournament of Champions in Las Vegas, but was defeated by Kelly Kulick, 265–195. Kulick made history in this match by becoming the first woman to win a PBA Tour title.

In February 2010, Barnes again qualified as the #1 seed at the USBC Masters, however he was the victim of a 290 game by Walter Ray Williams Jr. in the televised championship match, losing 290–217.

In April 2011, Barnes had a chance to win the first-ever Dick Weber PBA Playoffs. In the final match against Dick Allen, he had a 25-pin lead after five frames before leaving back-to-back 7–10 splits on pocket hits. From that point forward, Allen cruised to victory.

== Career PBA statistics ==
Statistics are through the last complete PBA Tour season.

Season	Events	Cashes	Match Play	CRA+	PBA Titles	Average	Earnings ($)
1998	23	14	12	0	0	217.32	38,682
1999	26	18	14	6	2	223.86	119,485
2000	19	18	17	12	0	220.93	103,900
2001–02	30	25	19	5	1	219.03	143,165
2002–03	21	21	19	5	1	224.56	181,680
2003–04	21	17	12	7	1	222.37	191,550
2004–05	21	21	19	5	1	226.69	194,300
2005–06	19	18	14	4	1	220.15	174,700
2006–07	21	21	16	6	1	225.22	127,407
2007–08	21	21	18	9	2	225.18	142,410
2008–09	21	21	18	8	2	222.20	156,790
2009–10	19	18	14	4	0	220.73	116,510
2010–11	12	10	7	3	1	219.35	133,260
2011–12	14	10	5	2	1	222.92	60,280
2012–13	29	20	8	5	2	222.97	105,364
2014	17	12	4	1	1	221.52	96,958
2015	14	11	6	1	1	223.84	119,715
2016	20	11	7	2	0	216.39	38,007
2017	17	8	6	3	0	220.21	53,330
2018	15	10	4	1	1	213.65	43,335
2019	28	21	13	2	0	214.60	68,265
2020	16	8	5	2	0	--	40,850
2021	30	21	20	7	0	218.18	73,875
2022	13	2	0	0	0	208.50	16,185
2023	16	4	2	0	0	210.71	22,860
2024	13	4	2	0	0	217.17	25,483
2025	16	5	1	0	0	214.72	17,995
2026	8	3	0	0	0	214.29	9,550

+ Please note: CRA is an abbreviation for Championship Round Appearances.

== Awards and honors ==
- 1998 PBA Rookie of the Year
- 2007–08 Chris Schenkel PBA Player of the Year
- One of nine players in history to earn the PBA triple crown of majors (U.S. Open, PBA World Championship, PBA Tournament of Champions)
- 12 consecutive seasons (1999 through 2010–11) earning at least $100,000
- 64 total PBA titles, including PBA50 and Regional events
- 2018 PBA Hall of Fame inductee (first year of eligibility)
- Ranked #4 on the PBA's 2025 "Best 25 PBA Players of the Last 25 Seasons" list

== In the media ==
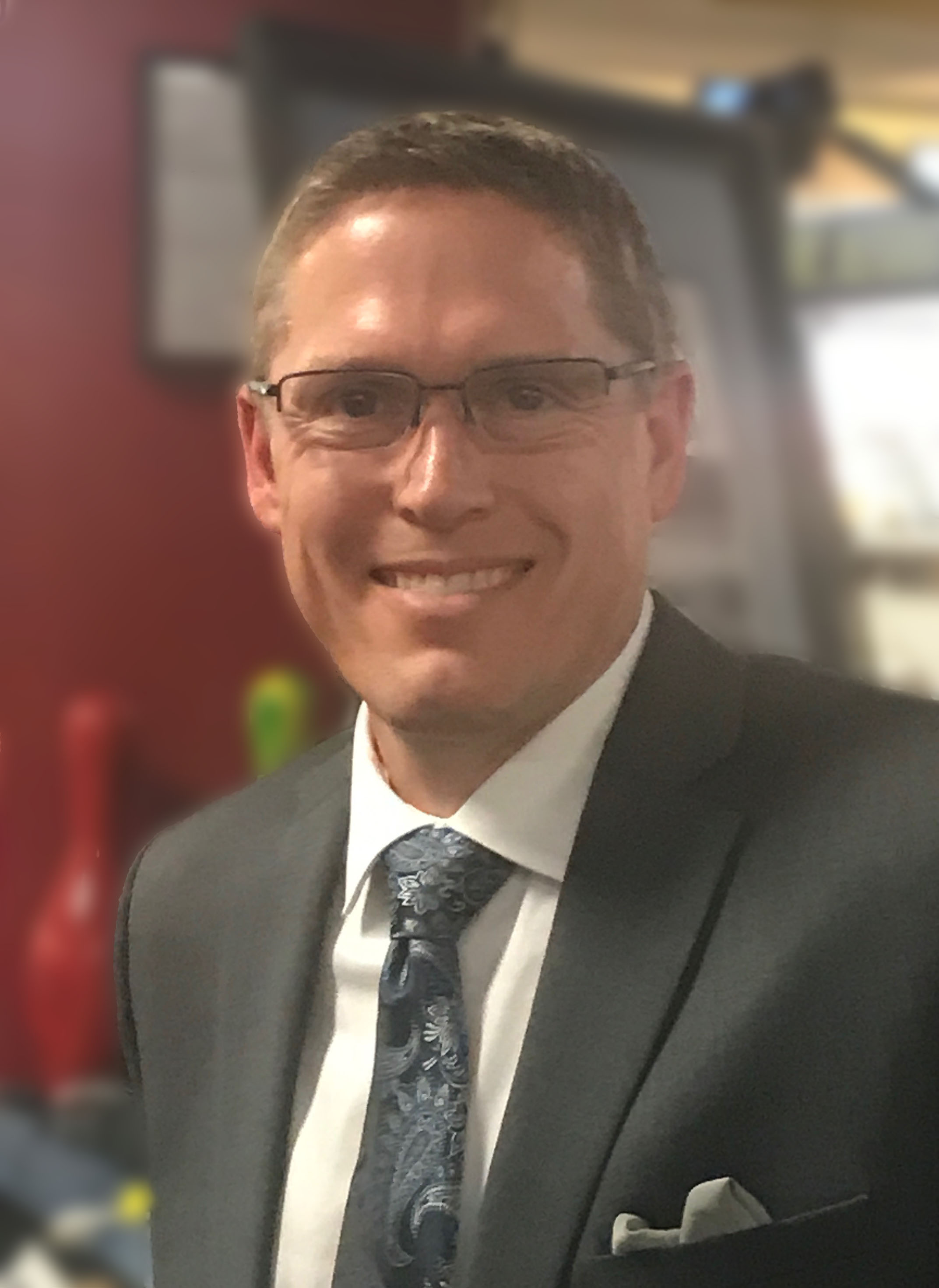
Barnes in a role as color commentator in 2019

During the 2006–07 Denny's PBA Tour season, fellow PBA Tour bowler Norm Duke took part in the ESPN telecasts for events in which he failed to reach the TV Finals. Along with Dave Ryan and Randy Pedersen, he served as a second color commentator. However, during events in which Duke made the TV Finals, Barnes filled in as the third commentator. In the 2011–12 season, Barnes has been the third commentator for several PBA World Series of Bowling finals events, joining Pedersen and Rob Stone. He also served as a lane-side reporter for the 2019 PBA Tour Finals on CBS Sports Network. During the 2026 season, Barnes served as analyst for four PBA50 World Series of Bowling final rounds that were televised in conjunction with PBA World Series of Bowling finals. Barnes also backed up TV analyst Kyle Sherman for two PBA WSOB tournaments where Sherman made the telecast as a player.

Barnes is also an official Sport bowling spokesperson for the United States Bowling Congress (USBC).

=== A League of Ordinary Gentlemen ===
Barnes is featured in the 2006 documentary A League of Ordinary Gentlemen, along with PBA Tour stars Pete Weber and Walter Ray Williams Jr., and 20-time PBA Tour titlist Wayne Webb. The film follows the four bowlers as they take part in the 2002–03 PBA Tour season.

== World Bowling accomplishments ==
In addition to his PBA accomplishments, Chris also won the World Tenpin Masters tournament in 2006 and was a semi-finalist in 2007 (losing to eventual tournament winner, Jason Belmonte of Australia). In 2008, he made the finals of the World Tenpin Masters, but lost to Guy Caminsky of South Africa. At the end of the 2007–08 season, he was ranked second in the PBA World Point rankings to Walter Ray Williams Jr.

Barnes won four gold medals at the American Zone Championships in Costa Rica in 1997. He represented the US at the WTBA Championships in Bangkok, Thailand in 2008. Chris was also chosen (along with female pro Stefanie Nation) to represent Team USA at the 2009 World Games, which took place in Kaohsiung, Taiwan in July, 2009.

In the 2009 Pan American Bowling Confederation (PABCON) Championships, Barnes helped Team USA gain a sweep of all six medals with his gold medal in the Masters singles event.

Barnes captained Team USA in its 2019 Weber Cup win over Team Europe. He participated in 12 of the 32 matches, going 5–2 in singles, and 1–2 in doubles, and 1–1 in team.

== Skills Challenge ==
Barnes is one of the top skill shot bowlers on the tour today. He has made the "Flying Eagle" more than anyone, but perhaps his greatest skills shot is his ability to bowl with his opposite hand, his left hand. PBA commentator Randy Pedersen jokingly stated that Barnes could be "borderline ambidextrous" on a Skills Challenge telecast, after Barnes threw a left-handed strike with the ball rolling under a chair placed on the lane.

His skills paid off in the 2005 Miller High Life Skills Challenge, when he defeated Parker Bohn III for the $20,000 top prize. In the 2006 PBA Skills Challenge, Barnes lost to eventual champion Norm Duke in the semifinals. For the 2006–07 Denny's PBA Tour season, bowlers competed in pairs. Barnes teamed up with 13-time tour titlist Del Ballard Jr. They were defeated in the opening round by Wes Malott and Chris Johnson.

== Professional putting ==
Prior to his bowling career, Barnes was a member of the Professional Putters Association, where he played professional Putt-Putt tournaments. In 1989, Barnes made his first television appearance earning $7,000 in the Putt-Putt SKINS game.
