= 1978 PBA Tour season =

PBA Bowling Tour: 1978 Season
- League: Professional Bowlers Association
- Sport: Ten-pin bowling
- Duration: January 4 – December 2, 1978

PBA Tour
- Season MVP: Mark Roth

PBA Tour seasons
- ← 1977 1979 →

This is a recap of the 1978 season for the Professional Bowlers Association (PBA) Tour. It was the tour's 20th season, and consisted of 35 events. Mark Roth set a PBA record by winning eight titles on the season, doubling his career total to 16. He also shattered Earl Anthony's single-season earnings record, taking home $134,500 in prize money.

Earl Anthony captured the second Firestone Tournament of Champions title of his career, in the process becoming the first PBA Player to reach 30 titles. Nelson Burton Jr. won the BPAA U.S. Open, while Warren Nelson was the surprise winner at the MGM PBA National Championship.

== Tournament schedule ==
Event	Bowling center	City	Dates	Winner
Miller Lite Classic	Gable House Bowl	Torrance, California	Jan 4–7	Mark Roth (9)
Ford Open	Mel's Southshore Bowl	Alameda, California	Jan 10–15	Marshall Holman (6)
Showboat Invitational	Showboat Hotel Lanes	Las Vegas, Nevada	Jan 15–21	Bill Coleman (1)
Quaker State Open	Forum Bowl	Grand Prairie, Texas	Jan 24–28	Mark Roth (10)
King Louie Open	King Louie West Lanes	Overland Park, Kansas	Jan 31 – Feb 4	Mark Roth (11)
Dutch Masters Open	Buckeye Lanes	North Olmsted, Ohio	Feb 7–11	Dick Ritger (19)
Midas Golden Challenge	Expressway Lanes	Gretna, Louisiana	Feb 14–18	Pete Couture (1)
AMF Magicscore Open	Kissimmee Lanes	Kissimmee, Florida	Feb 21–25	Earl Anthony (29)
Burger King Open	Don Carter's Kendall Lanes	Miami, Florida	Mar 1–4	Randy Lightfoot (1)
BPAA U.S. Open	Brunswick Friendly Lanes	Greensboro, North Carolina	Mar 5–11	Nelson Burton Jr. (13)
Rolaids Open	Dick Weber Lanes	Florissant, Missouri	Mar 14–18	Dave Davis (17)
Miller High Life Open	Red Carpet Celebrity Lanes	Milwaukee, Wisconsin	Mar 21–25	Fred Jaskie (1)
Long Island Open	Garden City Bowl	Garden City, New York	Mar 28 – Apr 1	Johnny Petraglia (11)
Greater Hartford Open	Bradley Bowl	Windsor Locks, Connecticut	Apr 4–8	Mark Roth (12)
Fair Lanes Open	Fair Lanes	Towson, Maryland	Apr 11–15	Butch Soper (1)
Firestone Tournament of Champions	Riviera Lanes	Akron, Ohio	Apr 17–22	Earl Anthony (30)
Columbia PBA Doubles Classic	Leilani Lanes	Seattle, Washington	May 31 – Jun 4	Mike Berlin (5), Jimmy Certain (1)
City of Roses Open	Timber Lanes	Portland, Oregon	Jun 8–9	Mark Roth (13)
MGM PBA National Championship	MGM Grand Lanes	Reno, Nevada	Jun 11–18	Warren Nelson (1)
San Jose Open	Saratoga Lanes	San Jose, California	Jun 21–25	Mark Roth (14)
Fresno Open	Cedar Lanes	Fresno, California	Jun 30 – Jul 3	Dave Davis (18)
Salt Lake Open	Bonwood Bowl	Salt Lake City, Utah	Jul 7–10	Wayne Chester (1)
Tucson Open	Golden Pin Lanes	Tucson, Arizona	Jul 14–17	Jeff Mattingly (1)
Amarillo Open	Amarillo Bowl	Amarillo, Texas	Jul 21–24	Steve Westberg (3)
Houston Open	Stadium Bowl	Houston, Texas	Jul 27–31	Steve Neff (4)
Sarasota Open	Galaxy Lanes	Sarasota, Florida	Aug 3–8	Steve Martin (1)
New England Open	Lang's Bowlarama	Cranston, Rhode Island	Aug 11–14	Mark Roth (15)
Buffalo Open	Thruway Lanes	Cheektowaga, New York	Aug 18–21	Larry Laub (10)
Waukegan Open	Bertrand Lanes	Waukegan, Illinois	Aug 24–27	Fred Conner (1)
Quad Cities Open	Plaza Bowl North	Davenport, Iowa	Sep 1–4	Steve Jones (2)
Brunswick Regional Champions Classic	Brunswick Olympic Bowl	Rochester, New York	Oct 27–30	Mark Roth (16)
Kessler Open	Ken Nottke's Bowl	Battle Creek, Michigan	Nov 3–6	Guppy Troup (1)
Northern Ohio Open	Westgate Lanes	Fairview Park, Ohio	Nov 10–13	Marshall Holman (7)
Syracuse Open	Strike 'n Spare Lanes	Mattydale, New York	Nov 17–20	Bill Spigner (2)
Brunswick World Open	Brunswick Northern Bowl	Glendale Heights, Illinois	Nov 25 – Dec 2	Wayne Webb (1)
