= 1980 PBA Tour season =

PBA Bowling Tour: 1980 Season
- League: Professional Bowlers Association
- Sport: Ten-pin bowling
- Duration: December 31, 1979 – November 11, 1980

PBA Tour
- Season MVP: Wayne Webb

PBA Tour seasons
- ← 1979 1981 →

This is a recap of the 1980 season for the Professional Bowlers Association (PBA) Tour. It was the tour's 22nd season, and consisted of 34 events. Wayne Webb broke the six-season Earl Anthony-Mark Roth stranglehold on PBA Player of the Year awards, as he achieved the honor on the strength of three titles, including the Firestone Tournament of Champions major. Webb was also the Tour's leading money winner on the season.

Steve Martin won his second career PBA title and first major at the BPAA U.S. Open. The following week, Johnny Petraglia captured the title at the PBA National Championship to give him his third career major and all three jewels of the PBA's "triple crown." Only Billy Hardwick had achieved this same feat to date.

Mark Roth made PBA Tour history in the finals of the season-opening event in Alameda, California, when he became the first player to convert the 7-10 split on national television.

== Tournament schedule ==
Event	Bowling center	City	Dates	Winner
ARC Alameda Open	Mel's Southshore Bowl	Alameda, California	Dec 31 – Jan 5	Warren Nelson (2)
Showboat Invitational	Showboat Bowling Center	Las Vegas, Nevada	Jan 6–12	Wayne Webb (4)
Miller High Life Classic	Brunswick Wonderbowl	Anaheim, California	Jan 15–19	Gary Dickinson (7)
Quaker State Open	Forum Bowling Lanes	Grand Prairie, Texas	Jan 22–26	Hugh Miller (1)
Rolaids Open	Dick Weber Lanes	Florissant, Missouri	Jan 29 – Feb 2	Alvin Lou (1)
Midas Open	Brunswick Northwest Bowl	Palatine, Illinois	Feb 5–9	Mike Aulby (2)
AMF Magicscore Open	Landmark Lanes	Peoria, Illinois	Feb 12–16	Joe Hutchinson (2)
Ford Open	Buckeye Lanes	North Olmsted, Ohio	Feb 18–23	Kyle Shedd (1)
True Value Open	Don Carter's Kendall Lanes	Miami, Florida	Feb 25 – Mar 1	Palmer Fallgren (2)
Fair Lanes Open	Fair Lanes University	Adelphi, Maryland	Mar 3–8	Nelson Burton Jr. (15)
Long Island Open	Garden City Bowl	Garden City, New York	Mar 11–15	Earl Anthony (32)
BPAA U.S. Open	Bradley Bowl	Windsor Locks, Connecticut	Mar 16–22	Steve Martin (2)
PBA National Championship	Sunnybrook Lanes	Sterling Heights, Michigan	Mar 24–29	Johnny Petraglia (14)
Miller High Life Open	Red Carpet Celebrity Lanes	Milwaukee, Wisconsin	Apr 1–5	Alvin Lou (2)
King Louie Open	King Louie West Lanes	Overland Park, Kansas	Apr 8–12	Ernie Schlegel (1)
Firestone Tournament of Champions	Riviera Lanes	Akron, Ohio	Apr 15–19	Wayne Webb (5)
Showboat PBA Doubles Classic	Showboat Bowling Center	Las Vegas, Nevada	Jun 2–6	Tommy Hudson (9), Pete Couture (2)
Northern California Open	Mowry Lanes	Fremont, California	Jun 13–17	Tom Baker (1)
City of Roses Open	Timber Lanes	Portland, Oregon	Jun 20–24	Ernie Schlegel (2)
Seattle Open	Leilani Lanes	Seattle, Washington	Jun 27 – Jul 1	Dave Beckmann (1)
U.S. Polychemical Open	Cedar Lanes	Fresno, California	Jul 4–8	Steve Cook (2)
Southern California Open	Gable House Bowl	Torrance, California	Jul 11–15	Steve Martin (3)
Tucson Open	Golden Pin Lanes	Tucson, Arizona	Jul 18–22	Mike Aulby (3)
Amarillo Open	Amarillo Bowl	Amarillo, Texas	Jul 25–29	Hugh Miller (2)
Quad Cities Open	Plaza Bowl North	Davenport, Iowa	Aug 1–5	Jim Godman (10)
Waukegan Super Touch Open	Bertrand Lanes	Waukegan, Illinois	Aug 8–12	Guppy Troup (2)
Buffalo Open	Thruway Lanes	Cheektowaga, New York	Aug 15–19	Joe Berardi (3)
Canadian Open	Hamilton Mountain Bowl	Hamilton, Ontario	Aug 22–26	Kevin Gillette (1)
Columbia 300 Open	Galaxy Lanes	Sarasota, Florida	Aug 29 – Sep 2	Bill Coleman (2)
Brunswick PBA Regional Champions Classic	Brunswick Olympic Bowl	Rochester, New York	Oct 10–14	Mark Roth (23)
Kessler Open	Royal Scot Lanes	Lansing, Michigan	Oct 17–21	Joe Berardi (4)
Kessler Classic	Astro Bowl	Greenwood, Indiana	Oct 24–28	Wayne Webb (6)
Northern Ohio Open	Westgate Lanes	Fairview Park, Ohio	Nov 1–4	Mike Durbin (7)
Syracuse Open	Brunswick Holiday Bowl	Syracuse, New York	Nov 7–11	Pete Couture (3)
