= 1977 PBA Tour season =

PBA Bowling Tour: 1977 Season
- League: Professional Bowlers Association
- Sport: Ten-pin bowling
- Duration: January 4 – December 10, 1977

PBA Tour
- Season MVP: Mark Roth

PBA Tour seasons
- ← 1976 1978 →

This is a recap of the 1977 season for the Professional Bowlers Association (PBA) Tour. It was the tour's 19th season, and consisted of 36 events. Earl Anthony's string of three consecutive PBA Player of the Year awards was snapped by Mark Roth. Roth won four titles on the season and made numerous other top-five finishes to lead the Tour in earnings (over $105,000).

Johnny Petraglia captured his second career major championship, winning the BPAA U.S. Open. Additional major titles for 1977 went to Mike Berlin (Firestone Tournament of Champions) and Tommy Hudson (Columbia PBA National Championship). Don Johnson collected his 26th career title, only to be caught and tied by Dick Weber the following week when Weber won his 26th. But both were now in Earl Anthony's rearview mirror, as the legendary lefthander earned his 27th and 28th titles during the season. For Johnson, his victory in Gretna, Louisiana in February gave him at least one title every season for the last 12 seasons – at the time, a PBA record.

== Tournament schedule ==
Event	Bowling center	City	Dates	Winner
Miller Lite Classic	Gable House Bowl	Torrance, California	Jan 4–8	Earl Anthony (27)
Ford Open	Mel's Southshore Bowl	Alameda, California	Jan 11–15	Steve Jones (1)
Showboat Invitational	Showboat Hotel Lanes	Las Vegas, Nevada	Jan 16–22	Mark Roth (5)
Quaker State Open	Forum Bowl	Grand Prairie, Texas	Jan 25–29	Henry Gonzalez (1)
Rolaids Open	Dick Weber Lanes	Florissant, Missouri	Feb 1–5	Steve Neff (3)
Midas Open	Expressway Lanes	Gretna, Louisiana	Feb 8–12	Don Johnson (26)
King Louie Open	King Louie West Lanes	Overland Park, Kansas	Feb 15–19	Dick Weber (26)
Miller High Life Open	Red Carpet Celebrity Lanes	Milwaukee, Wisconsin	Feb 22–26	Ed Ressler (3)
Monro-Matic Open	Bradley Bowl	Windsor Locks, Connecticut	Mar 1–5	Tommy Hudson (4)
AMF Pro Classic	Garden City Bowl	Garden City, New York	Mar 8–12	Dick Ritger (18)
Muriel Cigar Open	Buckeye Lanes	North Olmsted, Ohio	Mar 15–19	Roy Buckley (5)
BPAA U.S. Open	Brunswick Friendly Lanes	Greensboro, North Carolina	Mar 20–26	Johnny Petraglia (10)
Burger King Open	Don Carter's Kendall Lanes	Miami, Florida	Mar 28 – Apr 3	Teata Semiz (3)
Fair Lanes Open	Fair Lanes	Springfield, Virginia	Apr 6–9	Tommy Hudson (5)
Toledo Open	Imperial Lanes	Toledo, Ohio	Apr 12–16	John Denton (1)
Firestone Tournament of Champions	Riviera Lanes	Akron, Ohio	Apr 18–23	Mike Berlin (2)
Portland Open	Valley Lanes	Beaverton, Oregon	Jun 4–7	Dennis Lane (1)
Columbia PBA National Championship	Leilani Lanes	Seattle, Washington	Jun 12–19	Tommy Hudson (6)
PBA Doubles Classic	Saratoga Lanes	San Jose, California	Jun 24–27	Mark Roth (6), Marshall Holman (4)
Fresno Open	Cedar Lanes	Fresno, California	Jul 1–4	Mark Roth (7)
Southern California Open	Keystone Lanes	Norwalk, California	Jul 8–11	Mark Roth (8)
Tucson Open	Golden Pin Lanes	Tucson, Arizona	Jul 15–18	George Pappas (5)
Houston Open	Stadium Bowl	Houston, Texas	Jul 22–25	Carmen Salvino (15)
Quad Cities Open	Plaza Bowl North	Davenport, Iowa	Jul 29 – Aug 1	Mike Berlin (3)
Waukegan Open	Bertrand Lanes	Waukegan, Illinois	Aug 4–7	Earl Anthony (28)
Buffalo Open	Thruway Lanes	Cheektowaga, New York	Aug 12–15	Tom Wright (1)
Great Adventure Open	Curtis Suburban Lanes	Trenton, New Jersey	Aug 19–22	Steve Westberg (1)
New England Open	Lang's Bowlarama	Cranston, Rhode Island	Aug 26–29	Bill Spigner (1)
Sarasota Open	Galaxy Lanes	Sarasota, Florida	Sep 2–5	Steve Westberg (2)
AMF Regional Champions Classic	Berks Lanes	Reading, Pennsylvania	Oct 14–17	Dave Davis (16)
Buzz Fazio Open	Ken Nottke's Bowl	Battle Creek, Michigan	Oct 21–24	Mike Berlin (4)
Northern Ohio Open	Westgate Lanes	Fairview Park, Ohio	Oct 28–31	Joe Hutchinson (1)
Syracuse Open	Strike 'n Spare Lanes	Syracuse, New York	Nov 4–7	Paul Moser (2)
Brunswick World Open	Brunswick Northern Bowl	Glendale Heights, Illinois	Nov 13–19	Marshall Holman (5)
Hawaiian Invitational	(Multiple Centers)	Honolulu, Hawaii	Nov 25 – Dec 4	Tommy Hudson (7)
AMF Grand Prix of Bowling	Thunderbowl	Allen Park, Michigan	Dec 6–10	Jay Robinson (3)
