= 1979 PBA Tour season =

PBA Bowling Tour: 1979 Season
- League: Professional Bowlers Association
- Sport: Ten-pin bowling
- Duration: January 2 – November 17, 1979

PBA Tour
- Season MVP: Mark Roth

PBA Tour seasons
- ← 1978 1980 →

This is a recap of the 1979 season for the Professional Bowlers Association (PBA) Tour. It was the tour's 21st season, and consisted of 34 events. Following up on his eight titles a season ago, Mark Roth captured another six titles in the 1979 season, winning his third straight PBA Player of the Year award to match Earl Anthony's record of three POY crowns. Roth also averaged 221.66 during the 1979 season, to date the highest tour average in PBA history. The record was set before the advent of urethane bowling balls and wouldn’t be broken until 1993, two years after the advent of reactive resin bowling balls.

Joe Berardi won his first career PBA title at the BPAA U.S. Open, while Mike Aulby did the same at the Showboat PBA National Championship. Aulby's victory made him the youngest-ever winner of a PBA major event at 19 years, 83 days. He would hold this distinction until 2016, when Anthony Simonsen won the USBC Masters at age 19 years, 39 days.

George Pappas was the winner of the Firestone Tournament of Champions. Pappas led this major tournament wire-to-wire, from opening match through to the finals.

Marshall Holman won four titles on the season. With his win at the Seattle Open, the 24-year-old became the youngest PBA player to reach the career 10-title plateau (24 years, 274 days). (Pete Weber would take over this distinction by just 27 days when he won his 10th PBA title in 1987.)

== Tournament schedule ==
| Event | Bowling center | City | Dates | Winner |
|---|---|---|---|---|
| Miller High Life Classic | Brunswick Wonderland Bowl | Anaheim, California | Jan 2–6 | Carmen Salvino (16) |
| Showboat Invitational | Showboat Hotel Lanes | Las Vegas, Nevada | Jan 8–13 | Emmett Shutes (1) |
| Ford Open | Mel's Southshore Bowl | Alameda, California | Jan 16–20 | Steve Cook (1) |
| Quaker State Open | Forum Bowl | Grand Prairie, Texas | Jan 23–27 | Marshall Holman (8) |
| AMF Magicscore Open | Wonder Bowl | San Antonio, Texas | Jan 30 – Feb 3 | Dick Ritger (20) |
| Rolaids Open | Dick Weber Lanes | Florissant, Missouri | Feb 8–10 | Mark Roth (17) |
| Dutch Masters Open | Sunnybrook Lanes | Sterling Heights, Michigan | Feb 13–17 | Tommy Hudson (8) |
| Cleveland Open | Buckeye Lanes | North Olmsted, Ohio | Feb 20–24 | Cliff McNealy (1) |
| Firestone '721' Classic | Western Sunset Bowl | Miami, Florida | Feb 27 – Mar 3 | Roy Buckley (6) |
| Fair Lanes Open | Fair Lanes | Adelphi, Maryland | Mar 8–10 | Larry Laub (11) |
| King Louie Open | King Louie West Lanes | Overland Park, Kansas | Mar 13–17 | Mark Roth (18) |
| Miller High Life Open | Red Carpet Celebrity Lanes | Milwaukee, Wisconsin | Mar 20–24 | Johnny Petraglia (12) |
| Long Island Open | Garden City Bowl | Garden City, New York | Mar 27–31 | Earl Anthony (31) |
| BPAA U.S. Open | Bradley Bowl | Windsor Locks, Connecticut | Apr 1–7 | Joe Berardi (1) |
| Midas Golden Challenge | Brunswick Northwest Bowl | Palatine, Illinois | Apr 10–14 | Johnny Petraglia (13) |
| Firestone Tournament of Champions | Riviera Lanes | Akron, Ohio | Apr 18–21 | George Pappas (6) |
| Columbia PBA Doubles Classic | Saratoga Lanes | San Jose, California | May 30 – Jun 3 | Mark Roth (19), Marshall Holman (9) |
| Showboat PBA National Championship | Showboat Bowling Center | Las Vegas, Nevada | Jun 10–16 | Mike Aulby (1) |
| City of Roses Open | Timber Lanes | Portland, Oregon | Jun 19–23 | Mark Roth (20) |
| Seattle Open | Leilani Lanes | Seattle, Washington | Jun 26–30 | Marshall Holman (10) |
| Fresno Open | Cedar Lanes | Fresno, California | Jul 3–7 | Sam Flanagan (2) |
| Southern California Open | Gable House Bowl | Torrance, California | Jul 10–14 | Henry Gonzalez (2) |
| Tucson Open | Golden Pin Lanes | Tucson, Arizona | Jul 17–21 | Joe Berardi (2) |
| Amarillo Open | Amarillo Bowl | Amarillo, Texas | Jul 24–28 | Gary Dickinson (6) |
| Houston Open | Stadium Bowl | Houston, Texas | Jul 31 – Aug 4 | Ed Ressler (4) |
| Waukegan Open | Bertrand Lanes | Waukegan, Illinois | Aug 9–12 | Wayne Webb (2) |
| Buffalo Open | Thruway Lanes | Cheektowaga, New York | Aug 15–18 | Wayne Webb (3) |
| Sarasota Open | Galaxy Lanes | Sarasota, Florida | Aug 22–25 | Nelson Burton Jr. (14) |
| Brunswick Regional Champions Classic | Brunswick Olympic Bowl | Rochester, New York | Oct 5–9 | Fred Jaskie (2) |
| Kessler Open | Ken Nottke's Bowl | Battle Creek, Michigan | Oct 12–16 | Larry Laub (12) |
| Kessler Classic | Astro Bowl | Greenwood, Indiana | Oct 19–23 | Mark Roth (21) |
| Lawsons Open | Westgate Lanes | Fairview Park, Ohio | Oct 28–30 | Mark Roth (22) |
| Syracuse Open | Brunswick Holiday Bowl | Syracuse, New York | Nov 2–6 | Mike Durbin (6) |
| Brunswick Memorial World Open | Brunswick Deerbrook Lanes | Deerfield, Illinois | Nov 11–17 | Marshall Holman (11) |
