= 1982 PBA Tour season =

PBA Bowling Tour: 1982 Season
- League: Professional Bowlers Association
- Sport: Ten-pin bowling
- Duration: January 5 – November 20, 1982

PBA Tour
- Season MVP: Earl Anthony

PBA Tour seasons
- ← 1981 1983 →

This is a recap of the 1982 season for the Professional Bowlers Association (PBA) Tour. It was the tour's 24th season, and consisted of 34 events. Despite turning 44 years old during the season, Earl Anthony continued to roll through PBA opponents, winning another three titles. He topped his own records by winning a fifth PBA National Championship title along with his fifth PBA Player of the Year award. When Anthony won the ARC Alameda Open early in the season, it gave him at least one PBA title for a 13th straight season, topping the old mark of 12 straight seasons with a title set by Don Johnson. At this same tournament, Anthony also became the first player in PBA history to top the $1 million mark in career PBA Tour earnings.

Dave Husted joined a growing list of bowlers who captured their first career PBA title at the BPAA U.S. Open. Mike Durbin was victorious for a second time in the Firestone Tournament of Champions, ten years after he had first won this event.

Nineteen-year-old Pete Weber, son of 30-time PBA titlist Dick Weber, won two titles in 1982. This marked the first father-and-son combination ever to both earn titles on the PBA Tour.

== Tournament schedule ==
Event	Bowling center	City	Dates	Winner
Miller High Life Classic	Brunswick Wonderbowl	Anaheim, California	Jan 5–9	Guppy Troup (3)
Showboat Invitational	Showboat Bowling Center	Las Vegas, Nevada	Jan 10–16	James Miller (1)
ARC Alameda Open	Mel's Southshore Bowl	Alameda, California	Jan 19–23	Earl Anthony (37)
Quaker State Open	Forum Bowling Lanes	Grand Prairie, Texas	Jan 26–30	Art Trask (1)
BPAA U.S. Open	Big Texan Lanes	Houston, Texas	Jan 31 – Feb 6	Dave Husted (1)
Rolaids Open	Dick Weber Lanes	Florissant, Missouri	Feb 9–13	Bill Straub (2)
True Value Open	Landmark Plaza Recreation Center	Peoria, Illinois	Feb 16–20	Art Trask (2)
Toledo Trust PBA National Championship	Imperial Lanes	Toledo, Ohio	Feb 21–27	Earl Anthony (38)
Greater Miami Sunshine Open	Don Carter's Kendall Lanes	Miami, Florida	Mar 2–6	Bob Handley (2)
Fair Lanes Open	Fair Lanes Capital Plaza	Washington, DC	Mar 9–13	Mal Acosta (3)
Long Island Open	Garden City Bowl	Garden City, New York	Mar 16–20	Steve Cook (5)
Miller High Life Open	Red Carpet Celebrity Lanes	Milwaukee, Wisconsin	Mar 23–27	Earl Anthony (39)
King Louie Open	King Louie West Lanes	Overland Park, Kansas	Mar 30 – Apr 3	Pete Couture (4)
Cleveland Open	Buckeye Lanes	North Olmsted, Ohio	Apr 6–10	Art Trask (3)
Greater Hartford Open	Bradley Bowl	Windsor Locks, Connecticut	Apr 13–17	Pete Weber (1)
Firestone Tournament of Champions	Riviera Lanes	Akron, Ohio	Apr 20–24	Mike Durbin (10)
AC-Delco Classic	Gable House Bowl	Torrance, California	May 18–22	George Pappas (7)
Tucson Open	Golden Pin Lanes	Tucson, Arizona	May 25–29	Mike Durbin (11)
Seattle Open	Leilani Lanes	Seattle, Washington	Jun 1–5	Tommy Hudson (10)
City of Roses Open	Timber Lanes	Portland, Oregon	Jun 8–12	Pete Weber (2)
Kessler Open	Futurama Bowl	San Jose, California	Jun 17–21	Steve Cook (6)
Showboat Doubles Classic	Showboat Bowling Center	Las Vegas, Nevada	Jun 22–26	Nelson Burton Jr. (16), Sam Zurich (1)
Buffalo Open	Thruway Lanes	Cheektowaga, New York	Jul 16–20	Steve Martin (6)
Molson Bowling Challenge	Rose Bowl Lanes	Windsor, Ontario	Jul 23–27	Guppy Troup (4)
Waukegan Open	Bertrand Lanes	Waukegan, Illinois	Jul 30 – Aug 3	Wayne Webb (9)
Denver Open	Celebrity Sports Center	Denver, Colorado	Aug 6–10	Randy Lightfoot (2)
Aqua Fest Mr. Gatti's Open	Highland Lanes	Austin, Texas	Aug 13–17	Gary Skidmore (1)
Sarasota Open	Galaxy Lanes	Sarasota, Florida	Aug 20–24	Dave Husted (2)
AMF Grand Prix	Bowling de Paris	Paris, France	Sep 22–25	Tom Baker (5)
Northern Ohio Open	Westgate Lanes	Fairview Park, Ohio	Oct 15–19	Guppy Troup (5)
Kessler Classic	Woodland Bowl	Indianapolis, Indiana	Oct 22–26	Steve Fehr (1)
Columbia 300 Open	Sunnybrook Lanes	Sterling Heights, Michigan	Oct 29 – Nov 2	Wayne Webb (10)
Syracuse Open	Brunswick Holiday Bowl	Syracuse, New York	Nov 5–9	Dave Soutar (17)
Brunswick Memorial World Open	Brunswick Northern Bowl	Glendale Heights, Illinois	Nov 14–20	Steve Fehr (2)
