= Bowling on CBS =

America bowling television show

Bowling on CBS is the de facto title for CBS Sports' professional ten-pin bowling television coverage.

== History ==
=== CBS Bowling Classic (1964) ===
In 1964, the Professional Bowlers Association held 31 tournaments worth $1,200,000. Along the way, the PBA put another telecast on the air (after the Winter Tour finals went on the air for the first time on ABC just two years prior), the two-man bestball on CBS. Baseball legend Pee Wee Reese served as the play-by-play announcer while the color analyst was bowling great Billy Welu.

=== As part of the CBS Sports Spectacular (1979, 1998–99, 2008–09) ===
In 1979, CBS Sports Spectacular broadcast a ten match tournament during the PBA's Summer schedule. Frank Glieber and Ken Squier served as the play-by-play announcers with Dave Davis working on color commentary.

After ABC televised their final Professional Bowlers Tour event on June 21, 1997, CBS started airing a few events during the 1998 and 1999 seasons. The new network contract with CBS Sports guaranteed nine one-hour telecasts. It was reported in newspapers that Chris Schenkel did not intend to retire after the series ended, even though he was in his seventies by 1997, as he wanted to earn more money to pay for his grandchildren to go to college.

When CBS picked up the PBA Tour in 1998, there was talk of Schenkel moving to that network, but it never materialized. Gary Seibel (play-by-play) and Marshall Holman (color) got the jobs instead. When the PBA Tour moved to CBS in 1998, a two-match format was adopted. Again going to four bowlers, the #2, #3, and #4 players bowled in one "shootout" match, with the winner facing the tournament's #1 qualifier for the championship. From 1998 to 2000, also, the PBA used gold-colored pins with black stripes or crowns (depending on if Brunswick or AMF was involved in the alley) for their televised finals. The pins returned to regular white in 2001.

In 2008, Bo Burton served as an analyst alongside Bill Macatee, Michelle Hunter and Lynn Swann for the Bowling's Clash of Champions, a contest that pitted men against women. In this event, a historic first time that a woman ever beat a man in a TV final occurred in the $50,000 title match, when Lynda Barnes, wife of professional bowler Chris Barnes, defeated Sean Rash to take the title.

CBS would broadcast the Bowling's Clash of Champions again in 2009.

=== CBS Sports Network's coverage (2012–present) ===
ESPN featured bowling from 2000 to 2018 on Sunday afternoons, with CBS Sports Network also airing a smaller number of bowling tournaments by 2013.

Dave Ryan called PBA bowling events on the network alongside color analyst Randy Pedersen from 2002–2007. The Motel 6 Roll To Riches event marked Ryan's final PBA event. Ryan would be replaced the following season by Rob Stone. Ryan returned to PBA bowling broadcasts in June–July, 2013, when CBS Sports Network covered five events in the PBA Tour's "Summer Swing."

Other announcers that CBS Sports Network have utilized include Dave LaMont (play-by-play) and Chris Barnes (color commentary). From 2016 to 2018, LaMont was the lead play-by-play broadcaster for PBA Tour events on ESPN. Since the PBA's move to Fox Sports in 2019, LaMont has occasionally filled in for the current lead broadcaster Rob Stone when he is not available. Starting in 2016, Kelly Kulick has provided color commentary for CBS Sports Network broadcasts of the PWBA Tour, except in tournaments where she qualifies for the televised finals.

In April 2017, the PBA announced the first-ever Main Event PBA Finals, held May 18–20 in Orlando, Florida and broadcast for five consecutive Tuesdays on CBS Sports Network, starting May 30. This is an invitational event that serves as a type of bowling "playoffs", similar to The Chase for the Cup in NASCAR or the FedEx Cup in PGA golf. The event featured the top eight players in PBA Tour earnings, from the start of the 2015 season through this year's USBC Masters. Players were seeded 1–8 based on earnings, and split into Group 1 (1, 4, 5 and 8 seeds) and Group 2 (2, 3, 6 and 7 seeds). The groups bowled a mixed roundrobin match play session of four matches each, which made up the first two broadcasts. Players were then re-seeded within their groups, based on total pinfall plus a 50 pin bonus for every match win. Group 1 and Group 2 stepladder matches were held next, and were broadcast in the third and fourth weeks. The Group 1 and Group 2 winners then faced off in the fifth and final broadcast in a three-game, total pinfall head-to-head match to determine the PBA Finals champion.

Also beginning in 2017, CBS Sports Network carried the PBA Tour Finals. The 2019 edition took place July 20 and 21 in Las Vegas. (PBA Commissioner Tom Clark later announced an agreement with CBS Sports Network to cover the PBA Tour finals through the 2022 PBA season.) The tournament retained a similar format as in 2018, with eight top players seeded into two groups of four. The main difference for 2019 is that the eight players were determined based on Tour points ranking since the beginning of the 2018 season. (In previous PBA Tour Finals, the eight bowlers were chosen and seeded based on Tour earnings, not points.) CBS Sports Network broadcast an unprecedented nine hours of live coverage over the two days.

==== USBC Intercollegiate Team Championships (2004–09) ====
Back when CBS Sports Network was known as College Sports Television , they showcased the United States Bowling Congress Intercollegiate Team Championships. Beginning in 2004, CSTV aired the women's and men's national championship matches in early June. Chris Lincoln, Brian Webber, and Mike Jakubowski served as the play-by-play announcers with Chris and Lynda Barnes, and Kelly Kulick on color commentary. CBS would air the USBC Intercollegiate Team Championships through 2009, when ESPN took over the rights for the next two years.

==== Professional Women's Bowling Association (2015-present) ====
In 2015, the U.S. Women's open finals (September 6) and PWBA Tour Championship finals (September 13) were broadcast live on CBS Sports Network.

In 2016 however, CBS Sports Network aired the final round of all standard PWBA Tour events this season on a tape-delay basis. The final round for the major tournaments aired live or on same-day delay. TV tapings of the non-major stepladder finals were conducted in conjunction with first three major tournaments on May 26 (USBC Queens), June 26 (PWBA Players Championship) and August 7 (U.S. Women's Open). This was also the case a year later as TV tapings of the non-major stepladder finals were conducted in conjunction with first three major tournaments on May 23 (USBC Queens), June 25 (PWBA Players Championship) and August 6 (U.S. Women's Open).

Beginning in 2018, CBS Sports Network aired the final round of the three Elite Field standard tournaments and all major tournaments live.
