= 1981 PBA Tour season =

PBA Bowling Tour: 1981 Season
- League: Professional Bowlers Association
- Sport: Ten-pin bowling
- Duration: January 6 – November 21, 1981

PBA Tour
- Season MVP: Earl Anthony

PBA Tour seasons
- ← 1980 1982 →

This is a recap of the 1981 season for the Professional Bowlers Association (PBA) Tour. It was the tour's 23rd season, and consisted of 33 events. 1981 was a season of "fours" for Earl Anthony. He won an unprecedented fourth PBA Player of the Year award (his first since 1976), and captured his fourth PBA National Championship among his four titles on the season.

Marshall Holman, who had served a suspension for part of the 1980 season, came back strong to win three titles in 1981, taking his second career major at the BPAA U.S. Open. Steve Cook was the titlist at the Firestone Tournament of Champions.

== Tournament schedule ==
Event	Bowling center	City	Dates	Winner
Miller High Life Classic	Brunswick Wonderbowl	Anaheim, California	Jan 6–10	Steve Martin (4)
Showboat Invitational	Showboat Bowling Center	Las Vegas, Nevada	Jan 11–17	Mark Roth (24)
ARC Alameda Open	Mel's Southshore Bowl	Alameda, California	Jan 20–24	Bob Handley (1)
Quaker State Open	Forum Bowling Lanes	Grand Prairie, Texas	Jan 27–31	Marshall Holman (12)
BPAA U.S. Open	Big Texan Lanes	Houston, Texas	Feb 1–7	Marshall Holman (13)
Rolaids Open	Dick Weber Lanes	Florissant, Missouri	Feb 10–14	Earl Anthony (33)
AMF Magicscore Open	Landmark Plaza Recreation Center	Peoria, Illinois	Feb 17–21	Earl Anthony (34)
Cleveland Open	Buckeye Lanes	North Olmsted, Ohio	Feb 24–28	Mal Acosta (1)
PBA National Championship	Imperial Lanes	Toledo, Ohio	Mar 1–7	Earl Anthony (35)
Miller High Life Open	Red Carpet Celebrity Lanes	Milwaukee, Wisconsin	Mar 10–14	Mike Durbin (8)
King Louie Open	King Louie West Lanes	Overland Park, Kansas	Mar 17–21	Marshall Holman (14)
True Value Open	Don Carter's Kendall Lanes	Miami, Florida	Mar 24–28	Bo Bowden (1)
Fair Lanes Open	Fair Lanes Woodlawn	Baltimore, Maryland	Mar 31 – Apr 4	Wayne Webb (7)
Long Island Open	Garden City Bowl	Garden City, New York	Apr 7–11	Earl Anthony (36)
Greater Hartford Open	Bradley Bowl	Windsor Locks, Connecticut	Apr 14–18	Wayne Webb (8)
Firestone Tournament of Champions	Riviera Lanes	Akron, Ohio	Apr 20–25	Steve Cook (3)
U.S. Polychemical Open	Mowry Lanes	Fremont, California	May 19–23	Mal Acosta (2)
City of Roses Open	Timber Lanes	Portland, Oregon	May 26–30	Bill Spigner (3)
Seattle Open	Leilani Lanes	Seattle, Washington	Jun 2–6	Jeff Morin (1)
Pennzoil Open	Gable House Bowl	Torrance, California	Jun 9–13	Tom Baker (2)
Tucson Open	Golden Pin Lanes	Tucson, Arizona	Jun 15–19	Matt Surina (3)
Showboat Doubles Classic	Showboat Bowling Center	Las Vegas, Nevada	Jun 23–27	Joe Hutchinson (3), Tom Baker (3)
Denver Open	Celebrity Fun Center	Denver, Colorado	Jul 3–7	Tom Baker (4)
Waukegan Open	Bertrand Lanes	Waukegan, Illinois	Jul 10–14	Ted Hannahs (1)
Canadian Open	Rose Bowl Lanes	Windsor, Ontario	Jul 17–21	Mike Aulby (4)
Buffalo Open	Thruway Lanes	Cheektowaga, New York	Jul 24–28	Roy Buckley (7)
Sarasota Open	Galaxy Lanes	Sarasota, Florida	Jul 31 – Aug 4	Mike Durbin (9)
Aqua Fest Mr. Gatti's Open	Highland Lanes	Austin, Texas	Aug 7–11	Dave Soutar (16)
Kessler Classic	Woodland Bowl	Indianapolis, Indiana	Oct 16–20	Steve Cook (4)
Lansing Open	Royal Scot Lanes	Lansing, Michigan	Oct 23–27	Mark Roth (25)
Columbia 300 Open	Westgate Lanes	Fairview Park, Ohio	Oct 30 – Nov 3	Mark Roth (26)
Syracuse Open	Brunswick Holiday Bowl	Syracuse, New York	Nov 6–10	Frank Ellenburg (1)
Brunswick Memorial World Open	Brunswick Northern Bowl	Glendale Heights, Illinois	Nov 15–21	Steve Martin (5)
