= Bowling on NBC =

American bowling telecast

- The logo for NBC's PBA Tour coverage from 1991.
- Genre: Bowling telecasts
- Presented by: Sam Nover; Steve Neff; Jay Randolph; Earl Anthony; Leila Rahimi; Jerome Bettis; Todd Harris; Chris Barnes
- Narrated by: Don Pardo
- Country of origin: United States
- Original language: English

Production
- Camera setup: Multi-camera
- Running time: 90 to 180 minutes
- Production company: NBC Sports

Original release
- Network: NBC
- Release: 1953 – 1991

Related
- Jackpot Bowling; Sportsworld

Bowling on NBC is a presentation of professional ten-pin bowling matches from the PBA Tour formerly produced by NBC Sports, the sports division of the NBC television network in the United States.

== Historical overview ==
=== Championship Bowling ===
Prior to the Professional Bowlers Association (PBA)'s inception, bowling was broadcast on television sporadically beginning in the early 1950s. NBC began with an early 1950s special telecast entitled Championship Bowling.

=== Jackpot Bowling ===
Jackpot Bowling (also known as Phillies Jackpot Bowling and Jackpot Bowling Starring Milton Berle) was a professional bowling program that ran on NBC for two seasons from January 9, 1959, to March 13, 1961. It was the first bowling show on national television since Bowling Headliners. The program aired on Fridays at 10:30 p.m. Eastern Time, following the Cavalcade of Sports Friday Night Fight.

First hosted by Leo Durocher, who left after only two episodes, the program was subsequently hosted by Mel Allen. However, Allen was not popular with viewers as he showed a lack of bowling knowledge. He was replaced by Bud Palmer on April 10, 1959, before Allen returned in October 1959, remaining with the show until April 1960; Palmer subsequently returned to the program as host, staying through June.

Jackpot Bowling was put on a brief hiatus by NBC after the June 24 episode. When it returned on September 19, 1960, the program was retooled; the series not only moved to Monday nights at 10:30, but Bayuk Cigars replaced Phillies Cigars as sponsor, the Hollywood Legion Lanes replaced the T-Bowl in Wayne, New Jersey, as the program's venue, and Milton Berle took over as host.

=== Sportsworld ===
The NBC sports anthology series Sportsworld covered several professional bowling events throughout its run that were not broadcast as part of the Pro Bowlers Tour on ABC.

In 1980, NBC aired the "Legends of Bowling" mini-series on three consecutive Saturdays. The game consisted of 7 frames, with a combination of strikes and spare shots, with point values assigned to each frame. The winning team got a chance to make the "big money split" at the end. The play-by-play announcer was Sam Nover while the color analyst was Steve Neff. The off-stage announcer was the legendary NBC voice, Don Pardo.

From 1984 to 1991, it had its own series called "The PBA Fall Tour". Jay Randolph and Earl Anthony served as commentators. Unlike ABC's coverage, NBC was the first to introduce uninterrupted coverage of the championship match.

From 1988 to 1990, bowling had its own version of the Skins Game called The Bowling Shootout. Four bowlers (three pros and one amateur in the 1989 and 1990) competed. Each frame had a designated value and to win, the bowler on the floor must be the only one to strike, spare or have most pin count to claim the prize. A two-player tie meant all tied, but all players bowled regardless (where there was a game within a game). If it was still tied after the 10th frame, the players would go on to a one ball roll-off. The bowler with the highest monetary prize won the Shootout. In addition, the bowler who threw the most strikes (the game within a game) won a boat. Marshall Holman (who moved on to the roll-off in three consecutive tournaments: with Mark Roth in the 1988 Muskegon, Michigan, and the 1989 Reno, Nevada, Shootout, and the 1990 tournament in Atlantic City, New Jersey) won all three boats. Brian Voss (who moved on to the roll-off in the 1990 tournament, alongside Holman) was the only bowler to win a frame with a spare.

=== Bowlero Elite Series ===
March 2019, NBC announced that it would air three installments of the Bowlero Elite Series. This these are three single-elimination tournaments sponsored by Bowlero Corporation that feature the top professional and amateur bowlers competing for a total prize pool in excess of $1 million. The first two events, emanating from Chicago, Illinois, and North Brunswick, New Jersey, were scheduled to air on NBCSN on April 9 and September 11, 2019, respectively. The final installment, emanating from Jupiter, Florida, would air on December 28 on NBC.

NBC's commentators include Leila Rahimi (host and reporter), Jerome Bettis (guest analyst), Todd Harris (play-by-play), and Chris Barnes (analyst).

== See also ==
- PBA Tour in the media
