= Anthony Neuer =

American bowling player

Personal information
- Nickname: Ginger Assassin
- Born: Anthony Neuer; April 26, 2002 (age 24) Lewisburg, Pennsylvania
- Years active: 2020–present

Sport
- Country: United States
- Sport: Ten-pin bowling
- League: PBA
- Turned pro: 2021
- Partner: Hammer

Achievements and titles
- Regional finals: 6 PBA Regional Title

Anthony Neuer (born April 26, 2002) is an American bowler in the Professional Bowlers Association (PBA) known for being the fourth bowler to ever make the 7-10 split on television.

== Personal life ==
Neuer attended Lewisburg Area High School. His father Andy Neuer was also a professional bowler on the PBA tour, winning one PBA Title (1994 Bud Light Hall of Fame Championship).

== Achievements ==
Fourth player in PBA history to make the "7-10" split on TV. The other three are Mark Roth (1980), John Mazza and Jess Stayrook, both of whom did it in 1991.

Junior Team USA (2018-2021)

- One gold medal (all-events), two silver medals (doubles, trios) and one bronze medal (singles) at the 2019 PABCON Youth Championships

- One silver medal (doubles) at the 2019 World Bowling Junior Championships

- Five gold medals (singles, doubles, mixed doubles, team, national all-events) and one silver medal (all-events) at the 2017 Tournament of the Americas

Junior Gold Championships

- First-place finish at 2018 Junior Gold Championships (U20)

- Tied for ninth place at 2019 Junior Gold Championships (U20)

- Runner-up finish at 2017 Junior Gold Championships (U15)

- Third-place finish at 2016 Junior Gold Championships (U15)

- 25th-place finish at 2015 Junior Gold Championships (U15)

- 2014 U12 Junior Gold Championships winner

== PBA career ==
2021

On April 11, 2021. Neuer made his first appearance on TV, competing in the 2021 US Open in Reno, Nevada. He would be the fourth player to make the 7-10 split on Television and would finish third in the Stepladder, losing to Jakob Butturff 257–203.

On June 19, Neuer would participate in the "King of the Lanes" in Portland, Maine, where he'd win $3,000 after defeating Chris Via 210-187 advancing to face the current "King" Parker Bohn III. Neuer would lose to Bohn III 247–245. This was Neuer's second appearance on television.
