= Cheryl Robinson =

American professional bowler (born 1951)

Personal information
- Born: October 1951 (age 74–75) Westchester, California, U.S.
- Years active: 1970–1985

Bowling Information
- Affiliation: PWBA
- Rookie year: 1970
- Dominant hand: Right
- Wins: 4 PWBA Tour; 7 Worldwide
- Sponsors: AMF (Staff of Champions)

Cheryl Robinson (née Kominsky) of Placentia, CA (born October 1951) is a former professional right-handed 10-pin bowler. During her professional career from 1970 to 1985, she captured four PWBA Tour victories and seven Worldwide Women Professional Bowlers titles.

Among her four PWBA titles, Cheryl's most memorable victory was at the 1978 AMF Grand Prix of Bowling (Women's Division) in Reno, NV, which made her and husband Jay Robinson (1977 AMF Grand Prix Champion - Men's Division) the first married couple to win AMF Grand Prix titles.

In major tournaments, Cheryl reached the top-5 five times, three times in the U.S. Women's Open (1972, 1981, and 1984) and twice in the WIBC Queens (now USBC Queens) including her 1980 runner-up finish to Donna Adamek.

During her time as a professional bowler, Cheryl also served as the color commentator on the television syndicated series Celebrity Bowling alongside host Jed Allan from 1973 to 1977.

Cheryl was inducted into the Los Angeles Women's Bowling Association Hall of Fame in 1988 and USBC Hall of Fame in 2011.

== PWBA Tour titles ==
1. 1972 Lady Ebonite Open (Arcadia, CA)
2. 1974 Cavalcade of Stars (Wichita, KS)
3. 1976 Rockford Classic (Rockford, Ill)
4. 1978 AMF Grand Prix (Reno, NV)

== Additional Bowling Honors ==
- 1970 Alberta E. Crowe Star of Tomorrow award
- 1973 and 1975 Woman Bowler of the Year (Southern California BWAA)

== Personal life ==
Cheryl is a Mormon. In 1975, Cheryl married PBA bowler William "Jay" Robinson, a 3-time winner and 8-time finalist on the PBA Tour. During their 47+ years of marriage, they raised 2 daughters and 2 grandchildren. Jay died in March 2023.
