= Ernie Schlegel =

American professional ten-pin bowler

Personal information
- Born: April 11, 1943 (age 83) Manhattan, New York, U.S.
- Years active: 1968–2010
- Height: 5 ft 11 in (180 cm)

Bowling Information
- Affiliation: PBA
- Rookie year: 1968
- Dominant hand: Right (stroker delivery)
- Wins: 7 PBA Tour (2 majors); 2 PBA Senior Tour; 18 PBA Regional Tour; 1 PBA Senior Regional Tour
- Sponsors: Track, Contour Power Grips

Ernie Schlegel of Vancouver, Washington, is a retired professional ten-pin bowler and member of the Professional Bowlers Association (PBA), who competed on both the PBA Tour and PBA Senior Tour. While on the PBA Tour, Ernie won seven titles (including two majors) along with six runner-up finishes plus an additional 26 appearances in the top-five.

After graduating from high school in 1960, Schlegel made a living as an 'action' bowler (hustler) at the centers in and around the New York City and New Jersey metropolitan areas. Schlegel was interested in joining the pro tour as early as 1964, but then-PBA Regional Director Frank Esposito (who also owned Paramus Bowl in New Jersey) did not officially approve his membership until 1968, with Esposito saying "I approved him then because he had straightened himself out."

For the first 12-plus years on the PBA Tour, Schlegel was one the more distinguished non-winners on the tour, bowling in over 300 events and collecting $235,000. On his 37th birthday (April 11, 1980), Ernie finally reached the winners circle when he captured the 1980 King Louie Open with a 246–214 title match win over Nelson Burton Jr. He would win a second title in 1980, followed by single wins in the 1984, 1985 and 1989 seasons.

After a six-plus year title drought, Ernie won the 1995 Touring Players Championship at age 52, which was also his first major title. Qualifying as the final round's #2 seed, Schlegel beat Brian Voss 226–218 in the semifinal round. In the championship match, Schlegel narrowly defeated #1 seed Randy Pedersen, 237–236. In that match's 10th frame, Pedersen needed a strike on the first ball to win, but he famously left a "stone 8" pin, sending Schlegel into frenzied celebration. When the PBA unveiled their Top 60 Tour Moments during its 60th season in 2018, Schlegel's final frame against Pedersen tied for 10th.

Schlegel's second major title (also his final PBA Tour title) was conquered almost six months later at the 1996 ABC Masters. Ernie earned the tournament's #1 seed going into the finals and then beat defending champion Mike Aulby 236–200 in the title match to become this tournament's oldest winner (53 years, 23 days).

In 2001, Ernie surpassed $1 million in career earnings, by finishing 15th at the 2001 U.S. Open. He went on to win two titles on the PBA Senior Tour (now known as the PBA50 Tour).

Schlegel is a member of both the USBC and PBA Halls of Fame.

== PBA titles ==
=== PBA Tour ===
Major championships are in bold text.

1. 1980 King Louie Open (Overland Park, KS)
2. 1980 City Of Roses Open (Portland, OR)
3. 1984 Long Island Open (Garden City, NY)
4. 1985 Lite Beer Open (North Olmsted, OH)
5. 1989 ARC Pinole Open (Pinole, CA)
6. **1995 Bayer/Brunswick Touring Players Championship** (Harmarville, PA)
7. **1996 ABC Bud Light Masters** (Salt Lake City, UT)

=== PBA Senior Tour ===
1. 2003 PBA Senior Northern California Classic (Brentwood, CA)
2. 2007 PBA Senior Epicenter Classic (Klamath Falls, OR)
