= Celebrity Bowling =

American syndicated bowling series (1971–1978)

- Title card
- Genre: Game show
- Created by: Kira Stewart
- Directed by: Don Buccola
- Presented by: Jed Allan and Cheryl Kominsky
- Theme music composer: Jack Palmer; Spencer Williams
- Opening theme: "Everybody Loves My Baby", by King Richard's Fleugel Knights (1967 recording)
- Country of origin: United States
- No. of seasons: 8
- No. of episodes: 144

Production
- Producers: Joe Siegman; Don Gregory
- Production locations: Metromedia Square; Los Angeles, California
- Running time: 30 minutes
- Production company: 7-10 Productions

Original release
- Network: Syndicated
- Release: January 16, 1971 – September 1978

Celebrity Bowling is an American syndicated bowling sports series hosted by Jed Allan that ran from January 16, 1971, to September 1978. The series was produced in Los Angeles at Metromedia Square, the studios of KTTV.

Each week, the show featured four celebrities, on a pair of AMF or Brunswick lanes installed inside KTTV's studios, pitted against each other in teams of two. Victorious teams won prizes for home viewers, based upon the level of winning scores; there was an additional prize for the viewer associated with the team that bowled the most strikes.

The weekly series was a by-product of The Celebrity Bowling Classic, a 90-minute TV special produced in 1969 for the Metromedia-owned stations, benefitting the Joseph P. Kennedy Jr. Foundation. The series debuted at the same time the Prime Time Access Rule took effect, during which time a number of syndicated weekly programs went into production; its end came as weekly programs such as Celebrity Bowling were increasingly being replaced by twice-weekly and later stripped daily productions.

Joe Siegman created the series, and he and Don Gregory produced 144 episodes for their 7-10 Productions.

== Rules ==
Four celebrities played each game, separated into two pairs (usually each pair included one man and one woman). The rules of the game were known as "best ball"; for each frame, both members of each team would roll a ball on their own lane. If neither of the two teammates rolled a strike, then the person who rolled the worse shot (either a split or whoever knocked down the fewer pins) would then roll for the spare on the other lane. Players alternated lanes after each frame.

Each team was tied to a person in the audience, who would win prizes based upon the score the pair accumulated in the game. The viewer would win increasingly valuable prizes, mostly home appliances, if a team scored 1, 120, 150, 180, or 210 points (with the highest category usually resulting in the viewer winning a car or vacation; the top category was reached only once in the show's history). A bonus prize would also be awarded to the audience member whose team bowled the most strikes. Another prize could be won for scoring a "Turkey" (three consecutive strikes).

To accommodate the half-hour time slot, the sixth and seventh frames of each game were typically not televised.

== Cast ==
In addition to Jed Allan, many episodes included a bowling analyst, including PBA star Dave Davis, PWBA standout Cheryl Robinson and bowling author/expert Don Russell.

== Revivals ==
In 1987, 26 episodes of The New Celebrity Bowling were produced for national syndication. Jed Allan again hosted.

In 2008, TVS Television Network began producing Celebrity Bowling for TV syndication, using the AMF Lanes at the Silver Nugget Casino in North Las Vegas, Nevada. The host of the 2008 version was Las Vegas TV sports anchor Ron Futrell. Thirteen episodes were produced.

Another version called Stars & Strikes, produced by Don Gregory, was taped at the Lucky Strike bowling center inside L.A. Live, and was scheduled to air in the spring of 2011. The format was similar to the original, with an added twist that an audience member contestant could be called to bowl in place of a celebrity.

All-Star Celebrity Bowling, developed by comedian Chris Hardwick (whose father Billy was a world-class professional bowler) and hosted by Randy Sklar and Jason Sklar, was slated to air on AMC in 2014 but was canceled before making it to air as part of that channel's shift in focus toward scripted programs. The show is instead an internet-only show, and episodes can be found on YouTube.

== Episode status ==
All 144 episodes are presumed to exist, with syndication rights being held by the Peter Rodgers Organization. Episodes have aired on Decades, ESPN Classic, the Retro Television Network, My Family TV, and on the Roku device on the N2TV channel. Certain episodes are also available to watch on Hulu.

As of 2015, Weigel Broadcasting owns the broadcast rights to the series. Me-TV has made selected episodes available for streaming on their site on a weekly rotating basis. Selected episodes aired on Decades (a joint venture between Weigel and CBS) March 8–10, 2015, and as part of special "binge" weekends on October 3–4, 2015, and May 28–29, 2016.

The 2008 revival was available on TVS's Web site, TV4U, which shut down in 2012.

As of December 2017, the first three seasons were available via Amazon Prime Video. Forty-eight episodes are available on Peter Rodgers Organization's official YouTube channel.

The first three seasons are currently available on Tubi.

== Notable scores ==
In Episode 70, Season 2 Episode 3, the team of Michael Cole and Tige Andrews scored a 266, just 34 pins shy of a perfect score of 300. Their game easily surpassed the 210 score needed to win a new car, which was the top prize at that time. Jed Allan remarked that the previous high score was a 206, which was reached by Greg Morris and John Beradino in Episode 10. Cole and Andrews recorded a "mark" (strike or spare) in every frame bowled, as did Morris and Beradino.

The lowest score recorded during the original series is presumed to be a 66 by the team of Charles Nelson Reilly and Robert Clary in Episode 142. Reference is made at the show close by Jed Allan to the pair having "beaten" the long-standing record of 67 which was bowled by two of the Lennon Sisters.

While not a notable score, it is also noteworthy that Frankie Avalon, in Season 1 Episode 21, successfully converted the 5-7 split in the 10th frame.

== Home media ==
A three DVD set (containing fifteen episodes) was released on June 14, 2011 by S'More Entertainment. This was followed by a second volume later that year, which contained two episodes featuring the kids from The Brady Bunch playing, and a third volume of two episodes with comedians in 2012.
