= Henry Gonzalez (professional bowler) =

American professional ten-pin bowler (born 1950)

Personal information
- Born: September 2, 1950 (age 75) Santa Monica, California, U.S.
- Years active: 1974–2016
- Height: 5 ft 8 in (173 cm)

Bowling Information
- Affiliation: PBA
- Rookie year: 1974
- Dominant hand: Right
- Wins: 2 PBA Tour; 2 PBA Senior Tour; 25 PBA Regional Tour

Henry Gonzalez (born September 2, 1950) of Colorado Springs, Colorado, is a retired professional ten-pin bowler who competed in the PBA Tour and the PBA Seniors Tour.

While on the PBA Tour, Henry won the 1977 Quaker State Open and the 1979 Southern California Open. Additionally, he was the runner-up in the 1983 PBA Tournament of Champions, and achieved seven top-5 finishes.

At the 1983 Tournament of Champions, as the tournament's top seed in the final round, Henry was outlasted by Joe Berardi 186 to 179.

Once Gonzalez joined the PBA Seniors Tour, he captured victories in the 2005 PBA Senior Empire State Open and the 2006 PBA Senior Manassas Open.

Gonzalez was inducted into the Colorado State Bowling Association Hall of Fame in 2002.
