= Roy Buckley =

American professional ten-pin bowler

Personal information
- Nickname: Buckwheat
- Born: October 7, 1943 Columbus, Ohio, U.S.
- Died: September 4, 2021 (aged 77) Westerville, Ohio, U.S.
- Years active: 1970–1984
- Height: 5 ft 11 in (180 cm)

Bowling Information
- Affiliation: PBA
- Rookie year: 1970
- Dominant hand: Right (stroker delivery)
- Wins: 7 PBA Tour; 8 PBA Regional
- 300-games: 18

Roy Buckley (May 13, 1946 – September 4, 2021) of Westerville, Ohio was an American right-handed ten-pin professional bowler and member of the Professional Bowlers Association, bowling on the PBA Tour full-time from 1970 to 1982. While on the Tour, Buckley won seven tournament titles, along with ten runner-up finishes and over forty top-five appearances. He also earned over $600,000 in career prize money.

The majority of Buckley's PBA Tour success took place in the 1970s, where he won six of his seven tournament titles. Roy won his first title at the 1971 Winston-Salem Open. Also remembered for being a consistent casher on the tour, from 1971 to 1978, only Roy and Earl Anthony were the only bowlers to earn over $30,000 in every season.

His seventh and final PBA Tour title was conquered at the 1981 Greater Buffalo Sunkist Open, defeating Earl Anthony 213–207 in the championship match.

In ABC Open Championships play (now USBC Open Championships), Buckley captured 2 Eagles in 1975 and 1976 by winning team titles on the Munsingwear No. 2 team with teammates Nelson Burton Jr., Barry Asher, Bud Horn and Norm Meyers.

Buckley was inducted into the Ohio State USBC Hall of Fame in 1988, the PBA Hall of Fame 1992.

Buckley, who had been suffering from stage 4 lung cancer, died on September 4, 2021.

He was posthumously inducted into the USBC Hall of Fame in 2024.

== PBA Tour titles ==
1. 1971 Winston-Salem Open (Cranston, RI)
2. 1972 Bellows-Valvair Open (Detroit, MI)
3. 1975 Canada Dry Open (Cleveland, OH)
4. 1976 ARC Alameda Open (Alameda, CA)
5. 1977 Muriel Cigar Open (Cleveland, OH)
6. 1979 Firestone 721 Classic (Miami, FL)
7. 1981 Buffalo Open (Cheektowaga, NY)
