= Strike-a-Thon =

The Frank Bacon Memorial Strike-a-thon is an annual charity bowling event (since 1984), in Connecticut, USA, which raises funds for the Western Connecticut Regional Hospice.

== Event ==
Originally named Strikes for Tykes, the bowling event began in 1984, and was organized by Frank Bacon and Jim Byrnes. It was renamed the Frank Bacon Memorial Strike-a-thon in 1993, and it was in that year that all proceeds of the event began to be donated to the Regional Hospice.

The event takes place in both Danbury, CT and Brookfield, CT, each spring and brings some of the biggest stars in professional bowling together with local bowlers and bowling enthusiasts. The event begins with a breakfast to honor local youth bowlers as well as local Hall of Fame inductees, and concludes with a bowling exhibition at Brookfield Lanes. The bowling exhibition includes the professionals, local youth and the top bowlers in the area competing as part of a tournament. All proceeds of the event go to the Hospice.

The tournament is named after Frank Bacon, the late proprietor of Brookfield Lanes.

== Notable guests of the event ==
Notable guests of the event have been:

Nelson Burton Jr. (who is a regular attendee), Norm Duke, David Ozio, Bryan Goebel, Walter Ray Williams, Jr., Pete Weber, Dick Weber, Brian Voss, Jason Couch, Randy Pedersen, Parker Bohn III, Johnny Petraglia, Marshall Holman, Mike Aulby, among others.
