= Larry Laub =

American bowling player

Personal information
- Born: November 17, 1943 (age 82) San Francisco, California, U.S.
- Years active: 1962–2010
- Height: 6 ft 0 in (183 cm)

Bowling Information
- Affiliation: PBA
- Dominant hand: Right
- Wins: 12 PBA Tour (1 Major); 4 PBA Senior Tour (1 major); Senior PBA Rookie of the Year (1994)
- 300-games: 23

Larry Laub (born November 17, 1943) of Lincoln, California, is an American retired professional ten-pin bowler and member of the Professional Bowlers Association, who bowled on both the PBA Tour and PBA Senior Tour (now PBA50 Tour).

== Career ==
During Laub's PBA Tour career that spanned four decades, he captured twelve tournament victories, three of those wins happening in 1974 including his lone major title at the BPAA U.S. Open (defeating Dave Davis in the championship match 258–237). With Laub's success in 1974, he finished second to Earl Anthony in victories and championship round appearances.

When Laub won the 1979 Fair Lanes Open, he became the second bowler in PBA Tour history to win a tournament title after starting match play in the 24th and lowest position.

In addition to his tour victories, Larry has 13 runner-up finishes along with 50 appearances in the top-5. Laub's last top-5 appearance on the PBA Tour was in the 1995 ABC Masters.

On the PBA Senior Tour, Laub captured four tournament wins including one major, the 1997 PBA Senior National Championship. Additionally, Larry reached the top-10 three times at the USBC Senior Masters (1996, 1997 and 2003) and won the 1994 Rookie of the Year.

Laub is a member of the PBA Hall of Fame (inducted 1985) and the USBC Hall of Fame (2015).

During the PBA’s 50th season in 2008-09, Laub was named one of the "PBA’s 50 Greatest Players of the Last 50 Years" by a panel of bowling experts commissioned by the PBA, ranking at #37.

== Laub's PBA Titles ==
Major championships are in bold type.

=== PBA Tour ===
1. 1970 Tucson Centurion Open (Tucson, AZ)
2. 1971 Lincoln Open (Lincoln, NE)
3. 1972 King Louie Open (Kansas City, KS)
4. 1974 Don Carter Classic (Arcadia, CA)
5. 1974 Cleveland Open (North Olmsted, OH)
6. **1974 BPAA U.S. Open** (New York City, NY)
7. 1975 Denver Open (Denver, CO)
8. 1976 Portland HBO Open (Portland, OR)
9. 1976 Hawaiian Invitational (Honolulu, HI)
10. 1978 Buffalo Open (Cheektowaga, NY)
11. 1979 Fair Lanes Open (Adelphi, MD)
12. 1979 Kessler Open (Battle Creek, MI)

=== Senior PBA Tour ===
1. 1994 Palm Beach PBA Senior Classic (West Palm Beach, FL)
2. 1997 PBA Jackson (Tenn.) Senior Open (Jackson, TN)
3. **1997 PBA Senior National Championship** (Jackson, MI)
4. 2001 PBA Senior Northern California Classic (Brentwood, CA)

== Personal life ==
In 2001, Larry Laub married women's professional bowler Betty Morris.
