= Nelson Burton Sr. =

American ten-pin bowler

Nelson Burton Sr. (November 25, 1906 – May 14, 1994) was an accomplished professional ten-pin bowler and considered one of the greatest matchplay bowlers of all time. Burton was also in the bowling business, having owned five different bowling centers over a period of years. Burton was inducted into the ABC Hall of Fame in 1964.

== See also ==
- Nelson Burton Jr.
