= Split (bowling) =

Situation in ten pin bowling

Attempts to convert the 4-5-7 split (right-handed delivery using pearl coverstock bowling ball). Ball approaches at an angle to give the 4-pin enough forward momentum to contact the 7-pin. However, splitting the 4-5 gap too evenly sends the 4-pin sideways toward the gutter without contacting the 7-pin.

A split is a leave in tenpin bowling in which the first roll of a frame knocks down the front pin, the headpin, but leaves standing at least two non-adjacent groups of one or more pins.

On scoreboards, a split may be denoted by highlighting the number of pins knocked down in a different color or encased in a circle.

== Notable Splits ==
=== 7–10 split ===
A 7–10 split

One of the most infamous of splits is the 7–10, the leftmost and the rightmost pin in the back row. It has gained the nickname "goal posts," "bedposts," or "snake eyes" due to the appearance.

Due to the nature of the split being the two farthest pins of the pin deck, the split necessitates a pin to bounce and hit another pin in order to be converted. Various methods of achieving this include, after hitting a pin, having it bounce out of the pit area, bounce off the side wall, or clip a pin and slide it into the other, the last being incredibly rare. As a result, it is one of the most difficult splits to pick up.

==== Conversion History ====
Mark Roth was the first bowler to pick up the 7–10 split on television on January 5, 1980, at the ARC Alameda Open at Mel's Southshore Bowl in Alameda, California. Only three other professional bowlers have converted this split on television: John Mazza on February 16, 1992 and Jess Stayrook on July 13, 1991, both on the ABC broadcasts of the Professional Bowlers Tour, and Anthony Neuer, who accomplished it on April 11, 2021 during the U.S. Open Stepladder Finals on an ESPN telecast. All four converted their splits by bouncing a pin out of the pit. Roth is the only right-handed bowler as Mazza, Stayrook, and Neuer are all southpaws.

=== Big four (4–6–7–10) ===
The Big four, also known as the Golden Gate split, Big ears, Grandma's teeth, Double pinochle, consists of the two pins on either side of the pin deck.

The only professional to convert this split on television is Walter Ray Williams, Jr., doing so on an ESPN telecast in 2005, although there have been other bowlers to do so on camera.

=== Side-by-side splits (2–3; 4–5; 5–6; 7–8; 8–9; 9–10) ===
Also known as fit splits. Similar to baby splits because of their close distance from one another, the side-by-side split is almost always made by fitting the ball in between the two pins left standing. The 4–5 was referred to as the "Steam fitter" on Make That Spare.

=== Greek church (4–6–7–8–10 or 4–6–7–9–10) ===
This split is similar to the Big four, except there is another pin included, either the 8 or 9 pin. Statistical review reveals this shot to be the least-converted in professional bowling.

Doug Kent and Alan Bishop are the only players to have ever converted the Greek Church on television, with Kent doing so in the 1990 PBA National Championship (Converting the 4-6-7-9-10) and Bishop doing so in the 1992 Quaker Stake Open (Converting the 4-6-7-8-10).

=== Washouts ===
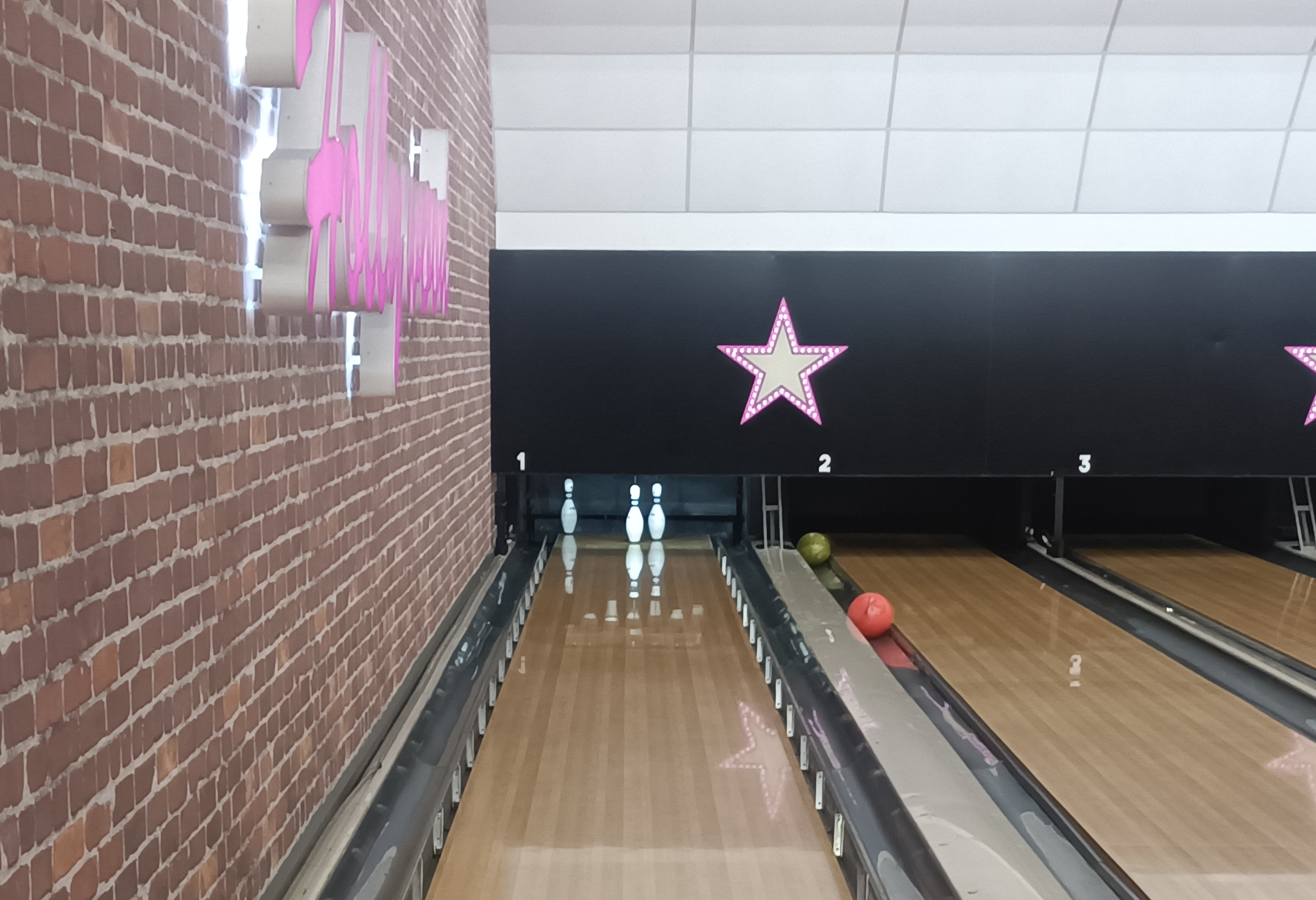
An example of washout (1-3-7)

Although not a split, as the headpin (1 pin) is still standing, washouts involve a setup of pins which are spaced out, including the headpin. Common examples of the washout include the 1–2–4–10, 1–2–8–10, 1–3–6–7, 1–2–10 and 1–3–7. Washouts are generally easier than most splits, because the headpin is in the front of the pin deck and therefore gives the bowler more room for error. The type of washout one leaves largely depends on if the bowler is left-handed or right-handed. For example, a left-handed bowler would leave washouts such as the 1–3–6–7 and 1–3–7–9, while a right-handed bowler would leave the 1–2–4–10 and 1–2–8–10. Modern variants include the 1-2-4-6-10 and 1-3-4-6-7, where the bowler only picked a single pin out as opposed to the normal two (picked 3 pin for right-handers, 2 pin for left-handers).

== List of Splits ==
Pins	Nickname	Similar splits	Image
7–10	Goal posts, Bedposts, Snake eyes		
7–9, 8–10	Cincinnati	4–6, 4–6–7, 4–6–10	
5–7, 5–10	Woolworth, Kresge, Dime store	2–6, 3–4, 4–9, 6–8	
5–7–10	Sour apple, Lilly, Full Murray, Three wise men		
3–7, 2–10			
2–7, 3–10	Baby split, Murphy	2–9, 3–8, 1–4, 1–6 (Note: Both splits that include the headpin are not technically splits, but washouts.)	
2–7–10, 3–7–10	Cocked hat, Christmas tree		
4–7–10, 6–7–10		4–10, 6–7 (Note: Though missing a pin, the splits are effectively the same.)	
4–9, 6–8		2–6, 3–4, 5–7, 5–10	
4–6–7–10	Big four, Golden Gate, Big ears, Grandma's teeth, Double pinochle		
2–3, 4–5, 5–6, 7–8, 8–9, 9–10	Fit splits, Steam fitter (for the 4–5)		
4–5–7, 5–6–10		2–3–4, 2–3–6, 4–5–8, 5–6–8	
4–6–7–8–10, 4–6–7–9–10	Greek church	4–6–8–10, 4–6–7–9	
3–4–6–7–10, 2–4–6–7–10	Big five		

== Splits in candlepin bowling ==
As in the tenpin game, splits can also occur in the New England and Canadian Maritimes-centered sport of candlepin bowling. As candlepin bowling uniquely allows the use of fallen "dead wood" pins to remain on the lane to be used in assisting the felling of standing pins for spare and split conversions, still the most notable split in the candlepin sport is the "spread eagle", the six-pin leave made up of the 2-3-4-6-7-10 combination, that due to the aforementioned "fit split" status of the 2–3 split in tenpins (but, with the smaller candlepin ball, the 2 and 3 pin can't be hit together with it) and the "spread eagle" almost never occurs in tenpins, with the closest split to it being the 2-(or 3-)4-6-7-10.

In contrast, even more difficult splits such as the infamous 7–10 split may be easier to convert in candlepin, since fallen pins are left on the lane after being knocked down; thus, if enough pins are spread across the lane, a strategically bowled ball could knock the fallen pins into both the 7 and 10 at the same time.
