= Jay Randolph =

American sportscaster (born 1934)

- Born: Jennings Randolph Jr. September 19, 1934 (age 91); Cumberland, Maryland, U.S.
- Occupation: Sportscaster
- Children: Jennings Randolph III (Jay Randolph Jr.), Rebecca Randolph, Brian Randolph
- Parent(s): Jennings Randolph, Mary Babb Randolph

Jennings "Jay" Randolph Jr. (born September 19, 1934) is an American sportscaster whose career has spanned more than fifty years.

== Early life and career ==
The son of U.S. Senator Jennings Randolph, he grew up in West Virginia, attended The George Washington University from 1952 to 1956, where was a member of Delta Tau Delta International Fraternity. As a young man he enjoyed considerable success as an amateur golfer. He played on the Golf Team at George Washington University and was inducted into their Athletic Hall of Fame in 1978. In 1958, Randolph began his broadcasting career as an announcer and sports director for a Clarksburg radio station.

== Career in St. Louis ==
Following play-by-play stints with the West Virginia Mountaineers in the late 1950s, and the Dallas Cowboys and SMU Mustangs in the early 1960s, Randolph went to St. Louis. He served as a staff announcer at KMOX radio in 1966, and as announcer and sports director for KSD (later KSDK) television from 1967 to 1988. At KSDK (Channel 5), Randolph anchored sports coverage for the station's newscasts and called TV play-by-play for St. Louis Cardinals baseball (as well as the first season of St. Louis Blues hockey in 1967–68). Randolph served as the over-the-air TV voice of the Cardinals for 21 seasons, split over two stints. He had a 17-year stint in the Cards' TV booth that ended after the 1987 season when the station lost the local rights, but was brought back in 2007 when KSDK got its small part of the TV pie, which ended in 2010. He did the "Randolph Report" on KFNS (590 AM) radio. Posted October 1, 2010, last referenced October 3, 2010.

== NBC Sports ==
Randolph also worked for NBC Sports television in the 1970s and '80s, announcing a wide variety of events including the National Football League, Major League Baseball, college football, college basketball, PGA Tour and LPGA golf, the Professional Bowlers Association, and three Olympic Games and the Breeders' Cup.

== Later career ==
Randolph called play-by-play for baseball's Cincinnati Reds in 1988 and Florida Marlins from 1993-1996, and hosted the Marlins' TV pregame from 1997-2000. He later broadcast golf events for CNBC and The Golf Channel. From 2007-2010 he called St. Louis Cardinals games on KSDK television. On October 2, 2010, the day before his final Cardinal broadcast, he was honored by the team by being selected to throw out the ceremonial first pitch to longtime friend and broadcast partner Mike Shannon. In 2011, Randolph worked as a features reporter and interviewer for Cardinals broadcasts on Fox Sports Midwest.

Randolph was inducted into the Texas Radio Hall of Fame in 2005, Missouri Sports Hall of Fame in 2008, and the Missouri Broadcaster Association Hall of Fame in 2012.

== Personal life ==
Randolph's son, Jay Jr., formerly provided commentary for the PGA Tour Network on XM Satellite Radio, and hosted a sports-talk show on KFNS radio (590 AM) in St. Louis. He also appeared frequently on KFNS 590 AM) in St. Louis. His son Jay Jr. died from cancer in 2022.
