= PWBA Bowling Tour: 2018 season =

- League: Professional Women's Bowlers Association
- Sport: Ten-pin bowling
- Duration: April 26 – September 4
- Season MVP: Shannon O'Keefe

PWBA Tour seasons
- ← 2017 2019 →

The 2018 Professional Women's Bowling Association (PWBA) Tour retains a similar schedule to the 2017 season, with 14 tournaments, 10 standard tournaments (9 singles, 1 doubles) and 4 majors, but includes two changes. First, the final round of each standard tournament will now be contested in the bowling center where the qualifying rounds occurred. (In the three previous seasons, these final rounds took place in the center where the next major tournament came up on the schedule.) Second, the final three standard events of the year will feature an “Elite Field” of 24 bowlers, based on season-to-date points list, that are automatically placed into the top 32 for match play. The remaining players will bowl a qualifying round for the other eight spots in match play.

The final rounds of the first six standard tournaments will air live on a PBA Xtra Frame Webcast. CBS Sports Network will air the final round of the three Elite Field standard tournaments and all major tournaments live.

The season's final event and final major, the PWBA Tour Championship, is an invitational featuring a starting field of only 16 bowlers. Tournament winners from the current season gain automatic entry into the starting field, with the remaining spots given to bowlers with the highest 2018 point totals among non-winners. The championship is set up in a bracketed elimination format, with players seeded 1-16 based on YTD points. The #5 through #16 seeds compete in Round 1, with the six winners joining the #3 and #4 seeds in the eight-player second round. The four winners from Round 2 then compete in Round 3, with the two survivors of those matches joining the #1 and #2 seeds in the four-player televised finals. All rounds leading up to the single-elimination televised finals are best three-of-five match play.

An additional PWBA title was available at the Striking Against Breast Cancer Mixed Doubles tournament, a cross-over event with the PBA Tour held on July 26-29 in Houston, Texas.

== Season awards and statistics ==
=== Player awards ===
- PWBA Player of the Year: Shannon O'Keefe
- PWBA Rookie of the Year: Jordan Richard

=== 2018 points leaders ===
1. Shannon O'Keefe (130,050)
2. Danielle McEwan (116,387.5)
3. Stefanie Johnson (102,115)

=== 2018 average leaders ===
1. Erin McCarthy (217.46)
2. Jordan Richard (217.43)
3. Danielle McEwan (216.41)

=== 2018 final round appearances ===
1. Shannon O'Keefe (7)
2. Danielle McEwan (6)
3. Jordan Richard (5)

== Tournament summary ==
Below is a list of events scheduled for the 2018 PWBA Tour season. Major tournaments are in bold. Career PWBA title numbers for winners are shown in parentheses (#).

| Event | Airdate | City | Preliminary rounds | Final round | Winner | Notes |
|---|---|---|---|---|---|---|
| PWBA Las Vegas Open | Apr 28 X | Las Vegas, NV | Apr 26–27 | Live | Shayna Ng, Singapore (1) | Open event. $10,000 top prize. |
| PWBA Sonoma County Open | May 5 X | Rohnert Park, CA | May 3–4 | Live | Shannon O'Keefe, USA (7) | Open event. $10,000 top prize. |
| PWBA Fountain Valley Open | May 12 X | Fountain Valley, CA | May 10–11 | Live | Danielle McEwan, USA (4) | Open event. $10,000 top prize. |
| **USBC Queens** | May 22 C | Reno, NV | May 17–21 | Live | Shannon O'Keefe, USA (8) | Open event, PWBA major. $20,000 top prize. |
| PWBA East Hartford Open | Jun 2 X | East Hartford, CT | May 31–Jun 1 | Live | Josie Barnes, USA (2) | Open event. $10,000 top prize. |
| PWBA Louisville Open | Jun 9 X | Louisville, KY | Jun 7–8 | Live | Erin McCarthy, USA (1) | Open event. $10,000 top prize. |
| PWBA Greater Harrisburg Open | Jun 16 X | Mechanicsburg, PA | Jun 14–15 | Live | Jordan Richard, USA (1) | Open event. $10,000 top prize. |
| **U.S. Women's Open** | Jun 30 C | Orlando, FL | Jun 23–29 | Live | Liz Kuhlkin, USA (2) | Open event, PWBA major. $20,000 top prize. |
| Storm Xtra Frame PBA/PWBA Striking Against Breast Cancer Mixed Doubles | Jul 29 X | Houston, TX | Jul 26–28 | Live | Liz Johnson, USA (23) & E. J. Tackett, USA | Open PBA and PWBA title event. $16,000 top prize. |
| PWBA St. Petersburg-Clearwater Open | Aug 4 C | Seminole, FL | Aug 2–3 | Live | Diana Zavjalova, Latvia (3) | Elite field event. $10,000 top prize. |
| PWBA Twin Cities Open | Aug 11 C | Eagan, MN | Aug 9–10 | Live | Rocio Restrepo, Colombia (4) | Elite field event. $10,000 top prize. |
| PWBA Columbus Open | Aug 18 C | Columbus, OH | Aug 16–17 | Live | Liz Johnson, USA (24) | Elite field event. $10,000 top prize. |
| **QubicaAMF PWBA Players Championship** | Aug 25 C | Plano, TX | Aug 22–24 | Live | Stefanie Johnson, USA (3) | Open members-only event, PWBA major. $20,000 top prize. |
| **PWBA Tour Championship** | Sep 19 C | Richmond, VA | Sep 16–18 | Live | Maria Jose Rodríguez, Colombia (1) | Invitational event, PWBA major. $20,000 top prize. |

- C: broadcast on CBS Sports Network
- X: broadcast on the PBA's Xtra Frame Webcast service
