= Leila Rahimi =

American television sports reporter

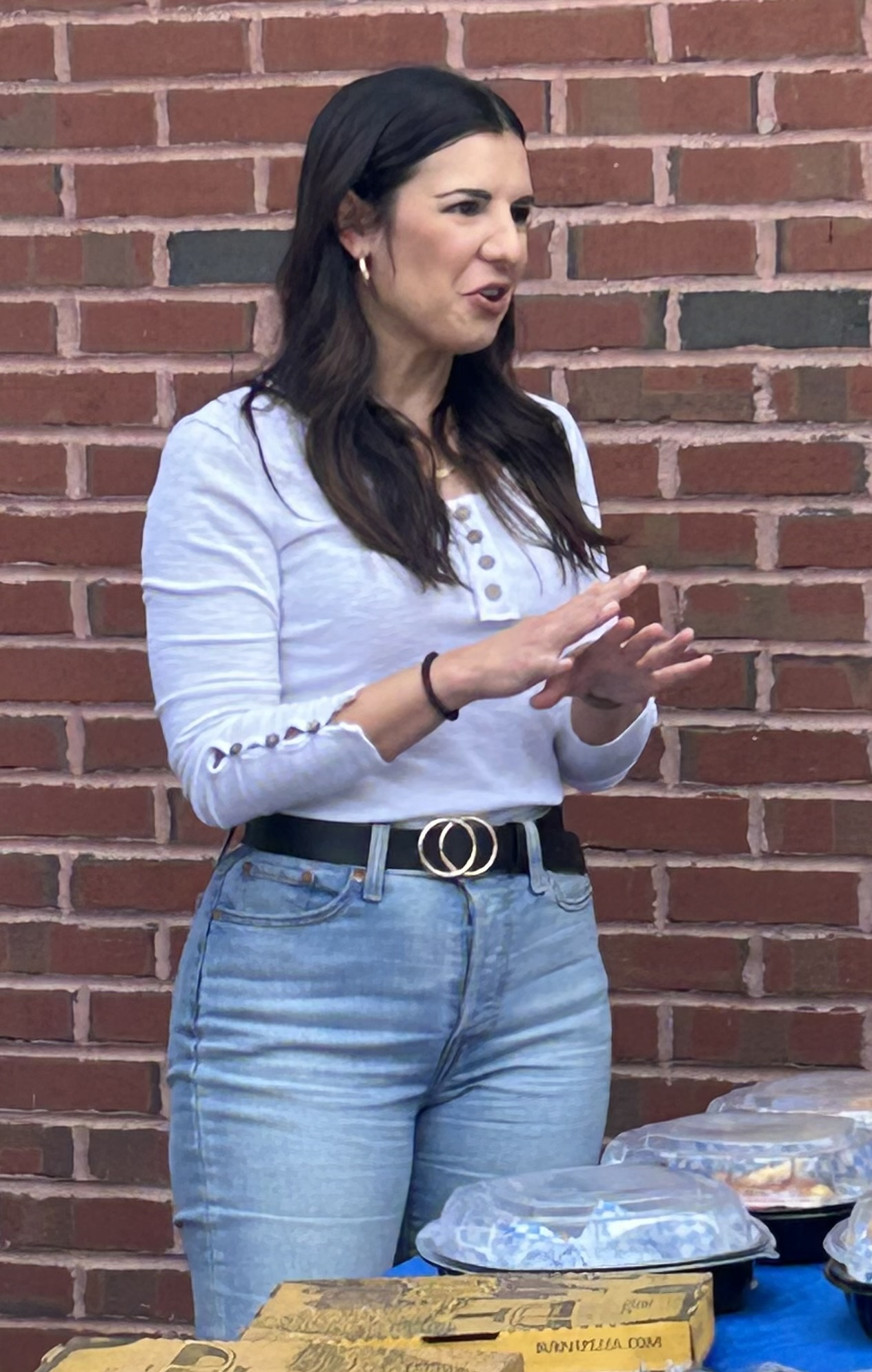
- Rahimi in May 2024
- Education: University of North Texas
- Occupations: Journalist; Newscaster
- Years active: 2001–present
- Television: KXII-TV; Fox Sports Southwest; KXAN-TV; Fox Sports San Diego; Comcast SportsNet Houston; MLB Network; Comcast SportsNet Philadelphia; NBC Sports Chicago; WMAQ-TV

Leila Rahimi is an American television sports anchor and reporter.

== Biography ==
Rahimi was born and raised in Denton, Texas. After high school, she interned with Dallas Mavericks announcers Wally Lynn and Mike Fisher. In 2002, she graduated magna cum laude from the University of North Texas with a degree in journalism. From 2001 to 2005, she worked as an anchor/reporter with KTCK-AM Sports Radio in Dallas. In 2006, she went to work as a sports anchor/reporter with CBS-affiliate KXII-TV in Sherman, Texas. She held various positions at Fox Sports Southwest in Dallas from 2001 to 2011. In 2007, she accepted a position with NBC-affiliate KXAN-TV in Austin, Texas. In 2012, she moved to San Diego to work for Fox Sports San Diego where she served as the field reporter for the San Diego Padres and produced a weekly program. She then returned to Texas, working at Comcast SportsNet Houston as an anchor, reporter, and sideline reporter for the Houston Astros and the Houston Rockets; while in Houston, she was nominated for several Emmy awards. In 2014 and 2015, Rahimi worked with the MLB Network while in Philadelphia and was an anchor and reporter for Comcast SportsNet Philadelphia. In October 2015, she was hired as the anchor for NBC Sports Chicago, where she, as of the 2019-20 season, serves as the sideline reporter for Chicago Bulls broadcasts and hosted White Sox pre-game and post-game shows. In August 2020, Rahimi was laid off from NBC Sports Chicago as part of company-wide cutbacks at NBCUniversal due to the ongoing COVID-19 pandemic.

In January 2021 Rahimi was announced as a partner to long-time WSCR host Dan Bernstein on a new mid-day show dubbed "Bernstein and Rahimi". She has since continued contributing to WSCR, making appearances on the "Bernstein and Holmes Show" (often referred to as "Leila Wednesdays") and occasionally filling in for either of them.

A year after she was laid off from NBC Sports Chicago, Rahimi returned to the NBCUniversal family in November as a part-time sports anchor and reporter for NBC-owned station WMAQ-TV. She is currently rotating her reporting alongside Mike Berman and Jeff Blanzy in the station's weeknight newscasts, and is currently co-hosting with Berman on the weekly sports news program Sports Sunday, replacing their longtime main sports anchor Siafa Lewis, who was hired by the CBS-owned station KYW-TV as the weekday news anchor in the same month. Rahimi was the second female co-host of Sports Sunday, behind Paula Faris.

In the 2023-24 season, Rahimi returned to sideline reporting duties for select Bulls home broadcasts on NBC Sports Chicago.

On April 28, 2025 Rahimi was named as its new midday show co-host alongside Marshall Harris following Bernstein's departure.
