= Jess Stayrook =

American professional bowler (born 1959)

Jess Stayrook (born 1959) is an American professional bowler. He is mainly known for being the third bowler to convert the 7-10 split on television after John Mazza (1991) and Mark Roth (1980). Stayrook's conversion took place during a tournament televised on ESPN in Tucson, Arizona in 1991.

Stayrook earned his first PBA national title in Seattle in 1989 and, after just two years of full-time tour competition, he established himself as a star with more than $100,000 in season earnings. He added two titles to his resume in 1991, and logged his second $100,000 season in three years.

Stayrook's best year came in 1995, when he won two titles and $137,330 in season earnings, ranking him fourth behind Mike Aulby, Dave D'Entremont and Walter Ray Williams, Jr. for earnings that year. His last victory came in 1996 and, to date, he has earned nearly $800,000 in his career.

Stayrook, who hails from San Diego, California, is an ex-carpenter, and earned the nickname "The Rock" because of his sturdy build and solid position at the foul line.
