= Jed Allan =

American actor and TV host (1935–2019)

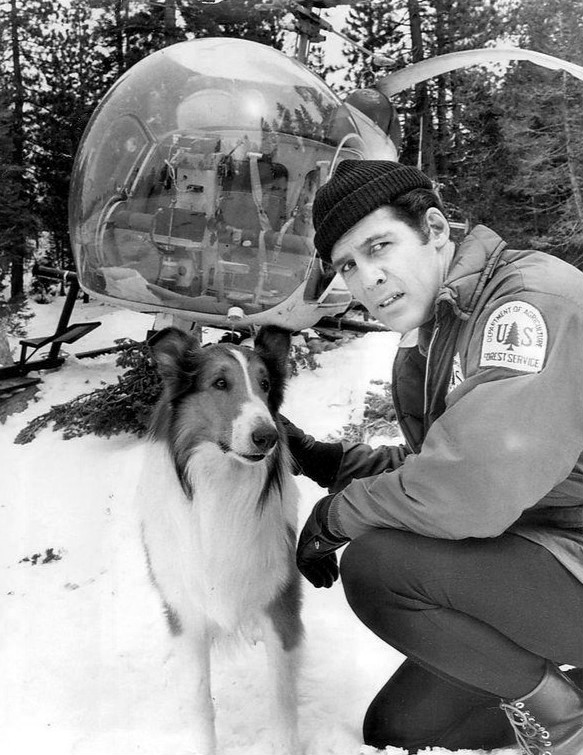
- Allan with Lassie in 1969
- Born: Jed Allan Brown; March 1, 1935; New York City, U.S.
- Died: March 9, 2019 (aged 84); Palm Desert, California, U.S.
- Occupations: Actor; game show host
- Years active: 1957–2012
- Spouse: Toby Brown (m. 1958; died 2001)
- Children: 3
- Awards: Soapy Award for Best Actor; 1979 Days of Our Lives; Soapy Award for Best Actor; 1978 Days of Our Lives

Jed Allan Brown (March 1, 1935 – March 9, 2019), known professionally as Jed Allan, was an American actor and television host, best known as C.C. Capwell on Santa Barbara, Don Craig on Days of Our Lives, Rush Sanders on Beverly Hills, 90210, Scott Turner on Lassie, Harold Johnson on The Bay, and the host of Celebrity Bowling.

== Life and career ==
=== Education and early career ===
Allan attended the University of Washington, where he majored in Drama. While in college, he supported himself working as a radio and television announcer and sportscaster. In the 1960s, he appeared in several Broadway productions such as Viva Madison Avenue!, Oliver!, and Barefoot in the Park.

=== Daytime television roles ===
Allan starred in several soap operas. He made his debut as trouble-making Ace Hubbard on Love of Life in 1964. He played college professor Paul Britton on The Secret Storm in 1964–65. Allan was one of many actors to play Paul, who was involved with the show's leading heroine, Amy Ames. Allan replaced his future Santa Barbara co-star Nicolas Coster in the part. He is best known for his role as Don Craig in Days of Our Lives, which he played from 1971 to 1985, his exit taking place as many of the show's veteran cast members were being written out so the show could focus on younger characters. His departure from Days of Our Lives was unpopular among his fans. His character was abruptly written out with minor explanation. He gained a new audience when he took over the role of C. C. Capwell in Santa Barbara from 1986 to 1993. After his time on Santa Barbara, Allan had a recurring role in Beverly Hills, 90210 playing Rush Sanders.

In 2004, he started playing the role of Edward Quartermaine in General Hospital.

=== Other projects ===
Allan's most notable television role outside of soap operas was when he starred on Lassie from 1968 to 1970 as Forest Ranger Scott Turner, who along with fellow ranger Bob Erickson (played by Jack De Mave) served as the collie dog's main human companion during that period.

He appeared in numerous made-for-television movies. He hosted Celebrity Bowling during the 1970s as well as a game show pilot, Temptation, in 1981 for Ralph Andrews and Columbia Pictures Television.

Allan was a featured character in several episodes of Adam-12. He played Reno West, a prolific burglar who was known as, "Take a little, leave a little" because of his M.O. He was finally caught by Reed and Malloy in the episode 'Capture' (season 6, episode 9).

Allan wrote a book, Please, Spell the Name Right, in reference to his name often being spelled incorrectly. The book is about his experiences of 50 years as an actor working with other actors and was released in November 2004. He also played Mr. Marraco in the Carman film, The Champion.

== Personal life and death ==
Allan was married to Toby Brown from September 21, 1958 until her death in 2001. The couple had three sons, Mitch, Dean, and Rick. Allan lived in Palm Desert, California.

He died on March 9, 2019, aged 84.

== Filmography ==
Film
Year	Film	Role	Notes
1968	Ice Station Zebra	Peter Costigan	
1974	The Man from Clover Grove	The Hippie	
1974	The Photographer	Joe Hennesey	
1994	Zero Tolerance	George Wells	

Television
Year	Title	Role	Notes
1964–1965	The Secret Storm	Professor Paul Britton #2	Unknown episodes
1968	Mannix	Ed Kovak	To the Swiftest, Death
1968–1970	Lassie	Ranger Scott Turner	26 episodes
1970	The Mod Squad	Frank Walsh	The Song of Willie
1971	The Mary Tyler Moore Show	Rod Porter	And Now, Sitting in for Ted Baxter
1971–1978	Celebrity Bowling	Himself	Entire series
1971–1985	Days of Our Lives	Don Craig	102 episodes
1973	Adam-12	John Spencer	Anatomy of a 415
1974	Kojak	Eddie Ryan	Dead on His Feet
1986–1993	Santa Barbara	C.C. Capwell (#4)	1,089 episodes
1994–1999	Beverly Hills, 90210	Rush Sanders	18 episodes
1995	Burke's Law	Wally King	Who Killed the King of the Country Club?
2001	Walker, Texas Ranger	Sam Cardinal	Reel Rangers
2001	Carman: The Champion	Laracco	
2002	Port Charles	Ed Grant	Unknown episodes
2004–2005	General Hospital	Edward Quartermaine (#3)	Unknown episodes
2011–2012	The Bay	Harold Johnson	Season 1 & 2
