= Professional Bowlers Tour =

American bowling telecast

- Logo (1986–1988)
- Genre: Sports, bowling
- Presented by: Chris Schenkel (1962–1997); Billy Welu (1961–1974); Nelson Burton Jr. (1975–1997) others...
- Country of origin: United States
- Original language: English

Original release
- Network: ABC (January 27, 1962–June 21, 1997); CBS (1998–99), (2026–present); Fox Sports Net (1999–2000); ESPN (2000–2018); CBS Sports Network (2012-Present); FOX (2018-2025); The CW (2026–present)
- Release: January 27, 1962 – present

The Professional Bowlers Tour, also known as Pro Bowlers Tour, is a broadcast of the Professional Bowlers Association that aired on ABC from 1962 to 1997. In the telecasts, sportscaster Chris Schenkel and the graphics displayed during the show would refer to the show as "The Professional Bowlers Tour", possibly to disambiguate from the NFL's use of the term "pro bowler" when referring to players who were selected for the Pro Bowl—an event also televised on ABC for many years.

== History ==
Prior to the debut of the PBA on ABC television in 1962, most tournaments were organized where, once the cut was established after qualifying rounds, a set number of match-play games were bowled, and bonus pins were given to the winner of each match. The champion was then decided based on the final overall total pinfall.

From 1962 to 1965, ABC started televising the PBA Tour, starting with a limited number of tournaments on ABC's Wide World of Sports, and later having its own timeslot. Therefore, a round-robin tournament format was implemented to determine the champion. The televised finals would be cut to the top four bowlers after match-play, and then three round-robin matches between the fourth, third and second-seeded bowlers would determine the final two bowlers. If any bowler were to win both of his matches in the round-robin, he would go on to face the tournament leader. If the three bowlers each split their matches to go 1 and 1 in the round-robin, total pinfall would decide which man would advance to the final match to face the tournament leader. The winner of the final match would win the tournament.

The first-ever telecast was actually taped and aired at a later date. The original commentators were Chris Schenkel and then-active bowling star Billy Welu. On May 16, 1974 Welu died suddenly of a heart attack.

For the remainder of the 1974 season, bowling legends Dick Weber and Dave Davis filled Welu's analyst spot, but it was the young Nelson Burton Jr. who was ultimately selected for the full-time analyst job in 1975. With Burton Jr. still an active player, Weber or Davis would fill in as analyst for tournaments where Nelson made the televised finals. Burton Jr. remained Schenkel's broadcasting partner until the end of the series.

=== Popularity ===
Bowling became extremely popular after ABC began airing it on Saturday afternoons in 1962 (it had previously dabbled in bowling with Make That Spare, a short-form series that had been airing on the network since 1960). The first Saturday afternoon telecast was the 1962 Empire State Open held at Redwood Lanes in Albany, New York, and was won by Fred Lening, 254–243, over J. Willard Sims. Chris Schenkel and Jack Buck called the action at that particular telecast. Throughout the 1970s and early 1980s, Pro Bowlers Tour typically outdrew college football (then stifled by NCAA restrictions) and college basketball (still not a major television event) in the ratings. Many sports fans considered it a weekly tradition to watch bowling on Saturday afternoons, which was a lead-in to ABC's Wide World of Sports. The series generally aired in the winter and spring as other networks later covered the summer and fall portions of the PBA Tour. In the 1990s, ABC also made stops in the summer events.

On the telecasts, Burton would host taped segments in which he would give tips or interesting facts about bowling.

=== Decline ===
Although the series maintained high ratings throughout most of its years, ABC (which was transitioning to new management after being purchased by The Walt Disney Company in 1996) opted against renewing its contract with the PBA, primarily due to the overall decline of bowling's popularity in the late 1980s and 1990s. This was partially attributed to the explosion of sports viewing choices in the 1990s, especially on cable television, the lack of any one bowling star to follow, and an aging audience for televised bowling. (Research in 1997 showed that 67% of the viewing audience for network TV bowling was at least 50 years old.)

Former PBA Commissioner Mark Gerberich, who presided over the PBA in the 1990s, summed up the decline in ABC viewership and related licensing contracts, stating, "In 1991, we got $200,000 a show which went into the prize funds. A year later, we got $50,000. In 1997, we were paying $150,000 to stay on TV."

=== End of ABC's broadcasts aftermath ===
The final PBT broadcast aired on June 21, 1997 at the St. Clair Classic in Fairview Heights, Ill. that was won by Walter Ray Williams Jr. It was a very emotional broadcast in which Williams Jr. and Pete Weber, the game's two giants at the time, battled it out until the very end. It essentially marked the end of an era of bowling on network television due to declining ratings, although CBS aired a few events during the 1998 and 1999 seasons. Fox Sports Net aired some bowling telecasts in 2000, and ESPN took over from there.

Footage of the series' final broadcast in 1997 is featured in the 2006 DVD documentary A League of Ordinary Gentlemen.

A member of the Weber family threw the first (Dick) and last (Pete) balls on the series, demonstrating how both the father and son each dominated their own eras of the sport.

It was reported in newspapers that Chris Schenkel did not intend to retire after the series ended, even though he was in his seventies by 1997, as he wanted to earn more money to pay for his grandchildren to go to college. When CBS picked up the PBA Tour in 1998, there was talk of Schenkel moving to that network, but it never materialized. Gary Seibel (play-by-play) and Marshall Holman (color) got the jobs instead.

Bo Burton has been the analyst on several bowling telecasts since his days on PBT. He analyzed PBA events for ESPN during the 1998 season. He also did color commentary for the 1998 Women's College Bowling Championship on ESPN2, which included future PBA member Kelly Kulick. Bo also called the 2007 and 2008 U.S. Women's Open events on ESPN alongside Marshall Holman, who developed somewhat of a friendship with Burton over the years as a frequent competitor on PBT telecasts. In 2008, Bo served alongside Bill Macatee and Lynn Swann for the Bowling's Clash of Champions, a contest that pitted men against women. In this event, broadcast on CBS, a historic first time that a woman ever beat a man in a TV final occurred in the $50,000 title match, when Lynda Barnes, wife of professional bowler Chris Barnes, defeated Sean Rash to take the title.

=== Return of bowling on ABC ===
The PBA, through its renewed contract with ESPN, returned to ABC for the first time in over thirteen years, as it televised the 2011 Tournament of Champions from Red Rock Lanes in Las Vegas. The event took place on January 22, 2011 in a live telecast, with Rob Stone and Randy Pedersen on the call, and Nelson Burton, Jr. joining them throughout the telecast with reflections on the history of the Pro Bowlers Tour on ABC. The second match of the telecast nearly ended in a perfect game as Mika Koivuniemi defeated Tom Daugherty 299–100. Daugherty broke the old record for the lowest game in PBA History of 129, previously held by Steve Jaros. The match was also the largest differential in PBA history, with a spread of 199 pins. Koivuniemi went on to defeat top seed Tom Smallwood in the final match to take home a PBA-record $250,000 first prize.

=== PBA on Fox ===
In March 2018, the PBA announced a multi-year agreement with Fox Sports to begin in 2019 and carry through at least the end of the 2022 season. Most events have been carried on Fox Sports 1, but the deal has provisions to carry some events on the Fox broadcast network.

== Commentators ==
- (1961–1974) Chris Schenkel, Billy Welu
- (1974–1975) Chris Schenkel, various guest commentators
- (1975–1997) Chris Schenkel, Nelson Burton Jr.

=== Other commentators ===
On some broadcasts, either Schenkel or Burton were on assignment so other commentators filled in.

- Verne Lundquist
- Al Michaels
- Dick Weber
- Johnny Petraglia
- Dave Diles
- Tim Brant
- Bud Palmer
- Keith Jackson

Mike Aulby and John Mazza, among other pros who were not competing on the telecasts, served as a lane-level reporters for PBT and would interview bowlers competing on the show.

It became somewhat of a running gag about how Schenkel was absent during some of the memorable moments of the series. He was not in the booth for the PBA's first-ever televised 300 game, rolled by Jack Biondolillo at the 1967 Tournament of Champions, due to a broadcast union strike. He was out on assignment covering other events for the network during each of the next two televised 300 games (Johnny Guenther in 1969 and Jim Stefanich 1974) and he also missed the first televised 7–10 split conversion as done by Mark Roth in 1980. Some even considered it to be a "curse" that if Schenkel was covering bowling, the bowlers would not throw a perfect game. This appeared to have some merit to it when Don Johnson rolled a memorable 299 in the 1970 Tournament of Champions. He needed a strike on his final ball, but left a 10-pin. The curse was finally broken in 1987; with both Schenkel and Burton in the broadcast booth, Pete McCordic rolled a 300 game against Wayne Webb. Immediately after the final strike, Schenkel yelled, "We have it! We have it!"

As his career progressed, he began covering bowling almost exclusively and thus saw most of the PBA's great moments toward the latter part of the series. Schenkel would be in the booth for five more televised 300 games, as well as one of the only other two televised 7–10 split conversions during the Professional Bowlers Tour series, by John Mazza.
