= Mike Berlin =

American bowling player

Personal information
- Born: December 24, 1943 (age 82) Muscatine, Iowa, U.S.
- Years active: 1976–1982
- Height: 5 ft 11 in (180 cm)

Bowling Information
- Affiliation: PBA
- Rookie year: 1976
- Dominant hand: Right
- Wins: 5 PBA Tour (1 major); 1976 PBA Rookie of the Year
- Sponsors: AMF (Staff of Champions)

Mike Berlin (born December 24, 1943) of Muscatine, Iowa is a retired right-handed professional ten-pin bowler, who bowled on the PBA Tour from 1976 to 1982. To start his tour tenure, Mike won PBA Rookie of the Year in 1976. In terms of tournament wins, Berlin bowled his way to 5 PBA victories including 1 major, the 1977 Firestone PBA Tournament of Champions.

Mike was inducted into the Iowa State Bowling Hall of Fame in 1982 and became the first Iowa-based bowler to be inducted into the USBC Hall of Fame in 1994.

In 2021, the PBA and Muscantine's bowling community honored Berlin's bowling career with a PBA Midwest Regional Tournament named the PBA Mike Berlin Midwest Classic at Muscantine's Rose Bowl Lanes.

== Berlin's PBA Tour titles ==
Major titles in bold type

1. 1976 AMF Regional Champions Classic (Minot, ND)
2. **1977 Firestone Tournament of Champions** (Akron, OH)
3. 1977 Quad Cities Open (Davenport, IA)
4. 1977 Buzz Fazio Open (Battle Creek, MI)
5. 1978 Columbia-PBA Doubles Classic w/Jimmy Certain (Seattle, WA)
