= John Mazza =

American professional ten-pin bowler

John Mazza (born February 23, 1964) is a left-handed ten-pin bowler and former touring player for the Professional Bowlers Association (PBA). Mazza won eight titles on the PBA Tour and collected over $850,000 in earnings. He also won 11 PBA Regional Tour titles.

== Professional career ==
Mazza became a PBA member in 1982, joining the full-time PBA Tour in the late 1980s. He finally hit his stride in 1991. That season, he won his first three PBA titles and the Harry Smith PBA Points Leader award, while cashing nearly $150,000 in earnings. He won multiple titles again in the 1994 season.

Mazza is most notable, however, for being the second player (and first left-hander) to convert the nearly-impossible 7–10 split on national television. Mark Roth was the first to make this split on TV (in 1980), and Jess Stayrook accomplished the feat shortly after Mazza during the same season (1991). The split would not be converted again on a PBA telecast until 2021, by Anthony Neuer.

=== PBA Tour titles ===
1. 1991 Florida Open (Winter Haven, FL)
2. 1991 Fresno Open (Fresno, CA)
3. 1991 Celebrity Denver Open (Denver, CO)
4. 1993 True Value Open (Peoria, IL)
5. 1994 Hilton Hotels Classic (Reno, NV)
6. 1994 AMF Dick Weber Classic (Richmond, VA)
7. 1997 Brentwood Classic (Brentwood, CA)
8. 1998 Ebonite Challenge 3 (Indianapolis, IN)

== Personal ==
In some ABC-TV Professional Bowlers Tour broadcasts during the early- to mid-1990s, Mazza served as a lane-level reporter.

After developing his bowling skills and turning pro while living in Bay City, Michigan, Mazza relocated to Shelby Township, Michigan.
