= Steve Neff =

American professional ten-pin bowler

Personal information
- Born: June 10, 1948 (age 78) Homosassa Springs, Florida, U.S.
- Years active: 1973–2013
- Height: 5 ft 9 in (175 cm)

Bowling Information
- Affiliation: PBA
- Rookie year: 1973
- Dominant hand: Right
- Wins: 4 PBA Tour (1 major); 1973 PBA Rookie of the Year; 6 PBA Senior Tour
- 300-games: 11

Steve Neff of Homosassa Springs, Florida, is a retired professional 10-pin bowler and member of the Professional Bowlers Association, who bowled on the PBA Tour and Senior PBA Tour. In PBA Tour events, Steve collected four victories (including one major), five runner-up finishes, and an additional nine appearances in the top five. On the PBA Senior Tour, Steve won six titles.

Before capturing his first PBA Tour victory in 1974, Steve earned PBA Rookie of the Year honors in 1973, on the strength of cashing in twenty-one of the twenty-seven tournaments he bowled.

Neff's lone major title victory was at the 1975 BPAA U.S. Open, defeating Paul Cowell 279–217 in the title match. He was also very close to capturing a second U.S. Open title in 1983 but was stopped by Gary Dickinson in the championship final, 214–202.

For the other major tournaments, at the Firestone Tournament of Champions, Steve's best finishes were fifth in 1975 and fourth in 1979. In the ABC Masters (now USBC Masters), he was the 1974 runner-up to Paul Cowell.

Additionally, Neff was the color analyst for the NBC Sportsworld broadcasts of the PBA Tour events alongside play-by-play announcer Sam Nover.

On the PBA Senior Tour, Steve's most significant victory was at the 1999 PBA Brunswick Senior National Championship. In addition, Steve won the PBA Senior Chillicothe Open in 2002 and 2003, making him the first bowler on the PBA Senior to successfully defend a tournament title since Johnny Petraglia did it at the PBA Senior Columbia 300 Open in 1999-2000.

== Neff's PBA Titles ==
Major championships are in bold type.

=== PBA Tour ===
1. 1974 Canada Dry Open (Detroit, MI)
2. **1975 BPAA U.S. Open** (Oak Lawn, IL)
3. 1977 Rolaids Open (Florissant, MO)
4. 1978 Houston Open (Houston, TX)

=== Senior PBA Tour ===
1. 1998 Jackson PBA Senior Open (Jackson, TN)
2. **1999 PBA Brunswick Senior National Championship** (Jackson, MI)
3. 1999 Northwest Senior Classic (Beaverton, OR)
4. 2001 Orleans Casino PBA Las Vegas Senior Open (Las Vegas, NV)
5. 2002 PBA Senior Chillicothe Open (Chillicothe, OH)
6. 2003 PBA Senior Chillicothe Open (Chillicothe, OH)
