= George Pappas (bowler) =

American ten-pin bowler

Personal information
- Born: March 3, 1947 (age 79); Charlotte, North Carolina, U.S.
- Years active: 1966–1986
- Height: 5 ft 9 in (175 cm)

Bowling Information
- Affiliation: PBA
- Rookie year: 1966
- Dominant hand: Right (stroker delivery)
- Wins: 10 PBA Tour (1 major); 2 PBA50/Senior
- 300-games: 25

George N. Pappas (born March 3, 1947) is an American former professional bowler from Charlotte, North Carolina, who has also served as an official in the PBA. He won ten PBA Tour titles between 1970 and 1984, including one major championship in 1979. He was inducted into the PBA Hall of Fame in 1986 and the USBC Hall of Fame in 1989. Pappas was ranked #33 in a "Top 50 Bowlers of the Last 50 Years" poll conducted by the PBA for its 50th anniversary season (2008–09).

== PBA career ==
Pappas joined the PBA in 1969, and quickly won his first two titles early in the 1970 season, at the Miller High Life Open and Greater Buffalo Open. He then had a drought of nearly four years, which included a heartbreaking 233–224 loss to Don Johnson in the final match of the 1972 U.S. Open. He finally got back on track with his third title at the King Louie Open in January 1974.

Pappas recorded the biggest triumph of his career when he captured the 1979 Firestone Tournament of Champions, leading that event wire-to-wire (from opening match through the finals). It was his sixth title, as well as his first and only major championship win. He had his best season in 1984, collecting his ninth and tenth PBA titles and earning over $100,000.

On the PBA Senior Tour (later called the PBA50 Tour), Pappas collected 2 titles, with his later victory in the 2004 PBA Senior Manassas Open.

=== PBA Tour titles ===
Major championships in bold type.

1. 1970 Miller High Life Open (Milwaukee, Wisconsin)
2. 1970 Greater Buffalo Open (Buffalo, New York)
3. 1974 King Louie Open (Overland Park, Kansas)
4. 1976 King Louie Open (Overland Park, Kansas)
5. 1977 Tucson Open (Tucson, Arizona)
6. **1979 Firestone Tournament of Champions** (Akron, Ohio)
7. 1982 AC-Delco Classic (Torrance, California)
8. 1983 Kessler Classic (Indianapolis, Indiana)
9. 1984 Showboat Invitational (Las Vegas, Nevada)
10. 1984 Buffalo Open (Buffalo, New York)

== Career after bowling ==
Pappas served as chair of the PBA's Tournament Committee and as PBA president for two years. He is currently the proprietor of two bowling centers. George Pappas Liberty Lanes in Gastonia, North Carolina and George Pappas Victory Lanes (incorporated 2006), a 40-lane bowling center in Mooresville, North Carolina.
