= Steve Martin (bowler) =

American professional ten-pin bowler

Personal information
- Nickname: Tennessee Twister
- Born: November 8, 1958 (age 67) San Francisco, California, U.S.
- Years active: 1977–1989
- Height: 5 ft 6 in (168 cm)

Bowling Information
- Affiliation: PBA
- Rookie year: 1977
- Dominant hand: Right (cranker delivery)
- Wins: 7 PBA Tour (1 major); 1977 PBA Rookie of the Year

Steve Martin (born Nov 8, 1958) of Kingsport, Tennessee, is an American retired professional ten-pin bowler and member of the Professional Bowlers Association. Martin joined the PBA Tour in 1977 and won PBA Rookie of the Year.

As for tournaments, Martin won 7 titles (including 1 major), along with 3 runner-up finishes and an additional 13 appearances in the top 5.

Among Martin's tournament titles, his most notable victory was at the 1980 U.S. Open defeating Earl Anthony 248–222 in the title match. Also, 3 of Martin's victories took place in Southern California, including his last career title at the 1985 Greater Los Angeles Open.

In 2005, Martin was elected in to the Tennessee USBC Hall of Fame for superior performance.

== Martin's PBA Titles ==
Major championships are in bold type.

1. 1978 Sarasota Open (Sarasota, FL)
2. **1980 BPAA U.S. Open** (Windsor Locks, CT)
3. 1980 Southern California Open (Torrance, CA)
4. 1981 Miller High Life Classic (Anaheim, CA)
5. 1981 Brunswick Memorial World Open (Glendale Heights, IL)
6. 1982 Buffalo Open (Cheektowaga, NY)
7. 1985 Greater Los Angeles Open (Torrance, CA)

== Additional Awards ==
- 1977 PBA Rookie of the Year
- 1985, 1986, and 1987 PBA Steve Nagy Sportsmanship Award
