= Steve Cook (bowler) =

American ten-pin bowler (born 1957)

Personal information
- Nationality: American
- Born: January 13, 1957 (age 69)

Bowling Information
- Affiliation: PBA
- Rookie year: 1979
- Dominant hand: Left
- Wins: 15 PBA Tour (3 majors)

Steve Cook (born January 13, 1957) is an American retired left-handed ten-pin bowler and member of the Professional Bowlers Association (PBA). He was known as the largest physical specimen on the PBA Tour, standing at 6 feet 7 inches (2.01 meters) tall, and weighing in around 260 pounds (~120 kilograms). He was inducted into the PBA Hall of Fame in 1993, and was ranked #25 on the PBA's 2008 list of "50 Greatest Players of the Last 50 Years." In 2014, Steve was elected to the USBC Hall of Fame for Superior Performance.

Cook won his first PBA Tour title at the age of 22 in the 1979 Ford Open, and finished with 15 titles in his career. Among the titles were major championships at the 1981 Firestone Tournament of Champions, the 1983 Touring Players Championship, and the 1986 U.S. Open (one of four total titles he earned in 1986 alone). Cook's final PBA Tour title was earned at the 1992 Cleveland Open. He cashed more than $800,000 during his PBA career.

== PBA Tour titles ==
Major championships are in bold text.

1. 1979 Ford Open (Alameda, California)
2. 1980 US Polychemical Open (Fresno, California)
3. **1981 Firestone Tournament of Champions** (Akron, Ohio)
4. 1981 Kessler Classic (Indianapolis, Indiana)
5. 1982 Long Island Open (Garden City, New York)
6. 1982 Kessler Open (San Jose, California)
7. **1983 Touring Players Championship** (Limerick, Pennsylvania)
8. 1985 Showboat Doubles Classic w/Mike Aulby (Las Vegas, Nevada)
9. **1986 BPAA U.S. Open** (Venice, Florida)
10. 1986 Greater Hartford Open (Windsor Locks, Connecticut)
11. 1986 Showboat Doubles Classic w/Mike Aulby (Las Vegas, Nevada)
12. 1986 Austin Open (Austin, Texas)
13. 1988 A&W Pro Bowlers Classic (Phoenix, Arizona)
14. 1989 Showboat Doubles Classic w/Mike Aulby (Las Vegas, Nevada)
15. 1992 Cleveland Open (Parma Heights, Ohio)

== Personal ==
Cook is the brother-in-law of fellow PBA Hall of Fame bowler Mike Aulby. Cook and Aulby were three-time winners of the PBA's Showboat Doubles Classic. After retiring from competition, Steve developed his own eponymous bowling supply business. Since 2016, he became the owner/proprietor of Steve Cook's Fireside Lanes, a 32-lane bowling center in Citrus Heights, CA located just outside Sacramento, CA
