= Dave Davis (bowler) =

American professional ten-pin bowler (1942–2022)

Personal information
- Born: April 28, 1942 Hackensack, New Jersey, U.S.
- Died: December 29, 2022 (aged 80)
- Years active: 1964–1984

Bowling Information
- Affiliation: PBA
- Rookie year: 1964
- Dominant hand: Left (stroker delivery)
- Wins: 18 PBA Tour (4 majors); 5 PBA Senior Tour (2 majors)
- Sponsors: Brunswick

Dave Davis (April 28, 1942 – December 29, 2022) was an American professional ten-pin bowler who was a member of the Professional Bowlers Association (PBA). He grew up in Hackensack, New Jersey, and resided in Palm Beach Gardens, Florida in his later life before moving to Lake Placid, Florida. Davis is a member of the PBA and USBC Halls of Fame.

== Professional career ==
Beginning his PBA career in 1964, the left-handed Davis won 18 PBA Tour titles, including four majors. He was known for his smooth yet powerful delivery and impeccably straight arm swing, which TV analysts Nelson Burton Jr. and Randy Pedersen have called one of the best in the game. In 1965, he became the first left-hander to win a PBA major, taking the title in the PBA National Championship at age 23.

Davis won multiple titles in a season four times, including six titles in the 1967 season alone. The 1967 season would see him win his second PBA National Championship on his way to PBA Player of the Year honors. The following season (1968) Davis won the PBA Tournament of Champions for his third major title. This title made Davis the youngest player in history (age 25 years, 343 days) to earn three PBA major championships. His record stood until 2022, when Anthony Simonsen won his third PBA major at age 25 years, 31 days.

After a long drought from 1971 to 1974, Davis came roaring back with three titles in the 1975 season, including his fourth and final major at the Tournament of Champions. He had a chance to win his third PBA National Championship in 1976, but lost the final match in heartbreaking fashion. After Paul Colwell tied the score at 191–191 in the regulation ten frames, Davis was defeated by Colwell 49–48 in a ninth/tenth frame frame roll-off when Davis left the 6-10 on the second shot of the tenth frame.

Davis was inducted into the PBA Hall of Fame in 1978. He had a total of 81 top-five finishes in his PBA career, including 24 runner-up finishes. The 1978 Fresno Open would turn out to be his last title on the regular PBA Tour. He made his final two PBA Tour telecasts in 1981 and 1982, both at the PBA National Championship major, but was eliminated before the final match in both events. He was ranked #19 on the PBA's 2008 list of "50 Greatest Players of the Last 50 Years."

Davis was inducted into the USBC Hall of Fame in 1990. He won the USBC Open Championships Classic Singles title in 1968. As a PBA Senior Tour bowler, he won back-to-back titles in the USBC Senior Masters (1995 and 1996) among his five total Senior titles.

=== PBA Tour titles ===
Major titles in bold text.

1. 1965 Salt Lake City PBA Open (Salt Lake City, UT)
2. **1965 Sixth Annual PBA National Championship** (Detroit, MI)
3. 1967 Las Vegas Open (Las Vegas, NV)
4. 1967 Denver Open (Denver, CO)
5. 1967 Miller High Life Open (Milwaukee, WI)
6. 1967 Green Bay Open (Green Bay, WI)
7. 1967 Nebraska Centennial Open (Omaha, NE)
8. **1967 Eighth Annual PBA National Championship** (New York City)
9. **1968 Firestone Tournament of Champions** (Akron, OH)
10. 1968 Durham Open (Durham, NC)
11. 1969 Canadian Open (Montreal, QC, Canada)
12. 1970 San Jose Open (San Jose, CA)
13. 1975 Miller High Life Open (Milwaukee, WI)
14. **1975 Firestone Tournament of Champions** (Akron, OH)
15. 1975 Brunswick World Open (Glendale Heights, IL)
16. 1977 AMF Regional Champions Classic (Reading, PA)
17. 1978 Rolaids Open (Florissant, MO)
18. 1978 Fresno Open (Fresno, CA)

== Additional roles ==
In addition to participating as a player, Davis served the PBA in various positions on the Executive Board and Tournament Committee.

For a brief period, Davis spent time in the TV broadcast booth, alongside play-by-play announcer Chris Schenkel. After the death of Schenkel's long-time broadcast partner, Billy Welu, in 1974, Davis and Dick Weber shared analyst duties on ABC-TV's Professional Bowlers Tour until Nelson Burton Jr. was hired as a full-time replacement in 1975. After Burton was hired, Davis would occasionally join him for a "Winning Never Gets Old" or "Tip of the Week" segment, and would also fill in as analyst during some events where Burton made the televised finals.

Davis also appeared regularly on the 1970s version of Celebrity Bowling as an analyst and cohost.

== Death ==
Davis died on December 29, 2022, at the age of 80, with his wife Joann by his side. He had successful open heart surgery in February 2021, but his kidneys started to fail soon after. He had been under hospice care for two weeks prior to his death. Davis had roomed on Tour with fellow PBA Hall of Famers and Brunswick pro staffers Dave Soutar and Johnny Petraglia. Said Soutar after Davis' death, "We were all with Brunswick, but the connection was that we all liked each other; we always had a good time together."
