= Tommy Hudson (bowler) =

American professional ten-pin bowler

Personal information
- Years active: 1972–1988

Bowling Information
- Sport: Tenpin bowling
- Affiliation: PBA
- Rookie year: 1972
- Dominant hand: Right (stroker delivery)
- Wins: 10 PBA Tour (1 major); 1972 PBA Rookie of the Year; 1976 Steve Nagy Sportsmanship Award
- Sponsors: Brunswick

Tommy Hudson (born 1947–1948) is a retired professional ten-pin bowler and former member of the Professional Bowlers Association (PBA). Hudson joined the PBA Tour in 1972 and won PBA Rookie of the Year honors that year.

Tommy won his first title at the 1974 Houston-Sertoma Open. He would go on to win a total of 10 PBA Tour titles. 1977 was his career year, and his only season with multiple titles. He claimed four titles that season, including his lone major at the Columbia 300 PBA National Championship, while making the top-five 14 times and climbing all the way to the title match nine times. He finished runner-up to Player of the Year Mark Roth. His final title was on July 5, 1982, at the Seattle Open. His final televised finals appearance (of his 49 career top-five finishes) was on November 1, 1983, at the Greater Detroit Open.

Tommy won the PBA's Steve Nagy Sportsmanship award in 1976. In 1989, he was inducted into the PBA Hall of Fame for superior performance.

Tommy was sponsored by Brunswick and became a member of that company's advisory staff. Two versions of Brunswick's "LT" bowling ball series (the green polyester LT-48 and the blue polyester LT-51) bore his name.

== Hudson's PBA Tour titles ==
Major championships are in bold text.

1. 1974 Houston-Sertoma Open (Houston, TX)
2. 1975 Home Box Office Open (Cheektowaga, NY)
3. 1976 Cleveland Open (Cleveland, OH)
4. 1977 Monro-Matic Open (Windsor Locks, CT)
5. 1977 Fair Lanes Open (Springfield, VA)
6. **1977 Columbia 300 PBA National Championship** (Seattle, WA)
7. 1977 Hawaiian Invitational (Hawaii)
8. 1979 Dutch Masters Open (Sterling Heights, MI)
9. 1980 Showboat PBA Doubles Classic w/Pete Couture (Las Vegas, NV)
10. 1982 Seattle Open (Seattle, WA)

== Awards and honors ==
- 1972 PBA Rookie of the Year
- 1976 PBA Steve Nagy Sportsmanship Award
- 1989 PBA Hall of Fame inductee
