= Nelson Burton Jr. =

American professional ten-pin bowler and TV bowling announcer

Nelson "Bo" Burton Jr. (born June 5, 1942 in St. Louis, Missouri, United States) is a retired professional ten-pin bowler, PBA Hall of Famer, and former longtime analyst for the Professional Bowlers Tour on ABC Television. He is the son of Nelson Burton, Sr., who himself was a successful bowler in his day, competing with the likes of Glenn Allison and Billy Welu. Burton compiled 18 titles on the PBA Tour, including two major championships, and earned $763,782 (USD).

== Bowling career ==
Burton won his first title in Louisville, Kentucky, on August 20, 1964, at age 22. He was the 1970 PBA Player of the Year, winning four titles and leading the tour in average. After a down year in 1971, Burton rebounded with three titles in the 1972 season. Burton won major titles at the 1976 ABC Masters and the 1978 BPAA U.S. Open. He twice finished runner-up in the PBA National Championship major (1966 and 1968).

Both Burton and his father are members of the United States Bowling Congress (USBC) Hall of Fame. Burton Jr. is also a member of the PBA Hall of Fame, elected in 1979. His 18th and final PBA tour title came in 1984 at the AMF Angle Open held just outside his hometown of St. Louis. In that tournament, Burton set a record for a televised four-game pin total with a combined score of 1,050 (278-279-257-236), topping Larry Laub's then-record of 1,021 set in 1972. Burton's record stood until 1995 when it was broken by David Ozio with a score of 1,070. That record subsequently fell in 1996 when Bob Learn Jr. famously shot 300 in the opening TV match of the PBA Flagship Open in his hometown of Erie, PA en route to a now-record four-game total of 1,129. Burton was ranked #15 on the PBA's 2008 list of "50 Greatest Players of the Last 50 Years."

=== PBA Tour Titles ===
Major championships in bold text.

1. 1964 Louisville Coca-Cola PBA Open (Louisville, Kentucky)
2. 1967 Greater Buffalo Open (Depew, New York)
3. 1969 Five-Star Open (Cranston, Rhode Island)
4. 1970 Denver Open (Denver, Colorado)
5. 1970 Buckeye Open (Toledo, Ohio)
6. 1970 El Paso Open (El Paso, Texas)
7. 1970 Fort Worth Open (Fort Worth, Texas)
8. 1972 Ebonite Open (Miami, Florida)
9. 1972 Miller High Life Open (Milwaukee, Wisconsin)
10. 1972 Waukegan Open (Waukegan, Illinois)
11. 1974 Home Box Office Open (Windsor Locks, Connecticut)
12. 1975 Midas Open (Windsor Locks, Connecticut)
13. **1976 ABC Masters** (Oklahoma City, Oklahoma)
14. **1978 BPAA U.S. Open** (Greensboro, North Carolina)
15. 1979 Sarasota Open (Sarasota, Florida)
16. 1980 Fair Lanes Open (Adelphi, Maryland)
17. 1982 Showboat Doubles Classic w/Sam Zurich (Las Vegas, Nevada)
18. 1984 AMF Angle Open (Florissant, Missouri)

== Broadcasting career ==
In 1975, Burton became the color analyst on ABC's Saturday afternoon telecast, The Pro Bowlers Tour, working with veteran sportscaster Chris Schenkel. He replaced Billy Welu, who had died the previous year. Only 33 at the time, Burton also continued to compete on the PBA Tour, vacating the broadcast booth if he made the TV finals of an event. (His broadcast backup on those occasions was usually Dick Weber or Dave Davis.) Burton spent nearly 23 years (1975 to 1997) with ABC. From 1978 to 1997, he hosted a bowling Tip Of The Week, usually after the second televised match. He and Schenkel were still working together when ABC ceased production of the series in June 1997.

After leaving ABC, Burton moved to ESPN and spent one year in 1998 providing analysis for select PBA broadcasts. He also was a commentator for the 1998 Women's College Bowling National Championship. He and former NBC bowling announcer Jay Randolph called the action on ESPN2.

Burton has also been involved with the Generations Bowling Tour, as both a competitor and color commentator on local telecasts.

In August 2007, Burton and Marshall Holman were the broadcasters for the 2007 U.S. Women's Open in Reno, Nevada on ESPN. The early rounds of the event were taped that month and aired every Sunday afternoon over the course of four weeks, starting Sept. 16. The live televised finals aired on Oct. 14, and Liz Johnson won the event. It was Bo's first national broadcasting work in nearly ten years. He also handled the broadcast of the 2008 U.S Women's Open, once again teaming with Holman.

Burton was the color analyst for the CBS telecast of the USBC "Clash of the Champions" that aired on May 10–11, 2008. He teamed with play-by-play man Bill Macatee and laneside reporter Lynn Swann. The broadcast marked bowling's return to network television for the first time since 1999 when CBS carried it.

Burton Jr. returned to the ABC broadcast booth for the 2011 PBA Tournament of Champions, the first ABC broadcast of a PBA event since 1997.

== Personal life ==
Burton has resided in South Florida with his family since 2001. He has not bowled regularly on the PBA Tour since 1986.

Burton has also been involved in the Strike-a-Thon.

Burton's brother, Neil Burton, was also a professional bowler for a brief time. Neil won the 1980 ABC Masters, just four years after Bo had won it.
