= Earl Anthony =

American professional bowler (1938–2001)

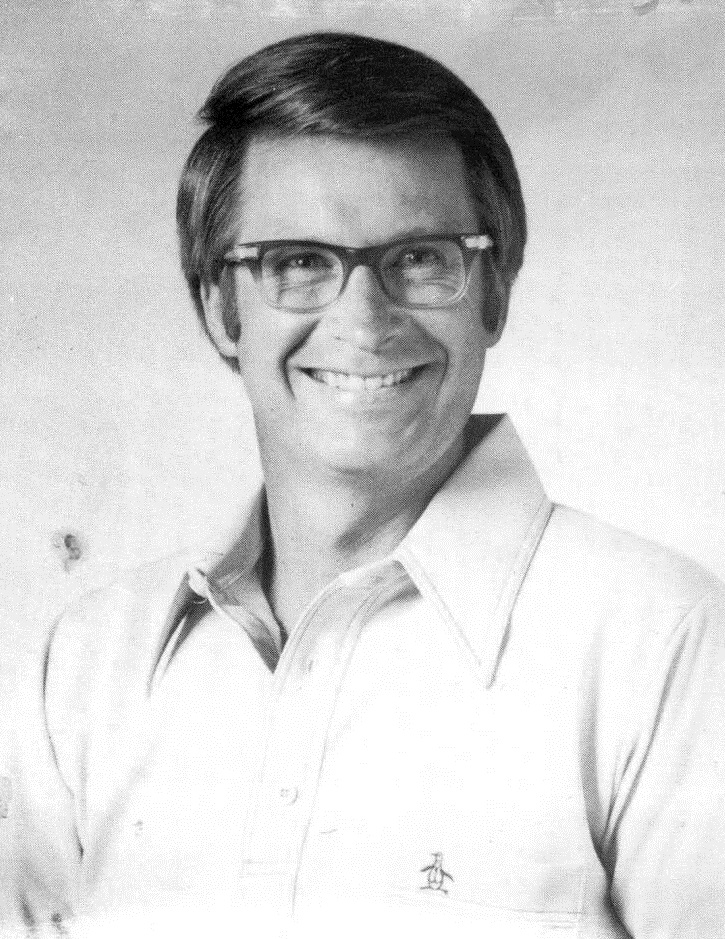
- Anthony in 1979

Personal information
- Born: Earl Roderick Anthony; April 27, 1938 Tacoma, Washington, U.S.
- Died: August 14, 2001 (aged 63) New Berlin, Wisconsin, U.S.
- Years active: 1963-1997
- Height: 6 ft 1 in (185 cm)

Bowling Information
- Affiliation: PBA
- Rookie year: 1970
- Dominant hand: Left (stroker delivery)
- Wins: 43 PBA Tour (10 majors); 7 PBA Senior Tour
- Sponsors: Brunswick

Earl Roderick Anthony (April 27, 1938 – August 14, 2001) was an American professional bowler who amassed records of 43 titles and six Player of the Year awards on the Professional Bowlers Association (PBA) Tour. For over two decades, his career title count was listed as 41. The count was amended to 43 in 2008, when the PBA chose to retroactively award PBA titles for ABC Masters championships if won by a PBA member at the time. He is widely credited (along with Dick Weber) for having increased bowling's popularity in the United States. He was the first bowler to earn over $100,000 in a season (1975), and the first to reach $1,000,000 in lifetime PBA earnings (1982). His ten professional major titles—six PBA National Championships, two Firestone Tournament of Champions titles, and two ABC Masters (now USBC Masters) titles—are the second most all time, tied with Pete Weber and five behind Jason Belmonte.

Anthony is one of only three bowlers in history (with Walter Ray Williams Jr. and Norm Duke) to have reached the 40-title plateau on the PBA Tour. However, Anthony compiled all of his titles in just 15 seasons on Tour. It took Williams 21 seasons to reach title number 40, while Duke won his 40th title in his 36th season. Anthony is also one of three bowlers (with Williams Jr. and Pete Weber) to earn at least 50 combined titles between the PBA Tour and PBA Senior Tour (now PBA50 Tour).

Never brash or flashy in a crew-cut and plastic-frame "marshwood" style eyewear (which he abandoned for more modern frames later in his career), Anthony was dubbed "Square Earl" by fellow pro bowlers.

A new biography of Earl (focusing more on his bowling career but with a few personal insights) was published in October 2019 by Luby Publishing. Compiled by sportswriter Barry Sparks, it is titled Earl: The Greatest Bowler of All Time.

== PBA career ==
Anthony's bowling career began when he hesitantly joined his company's bowling league, West Coast Grocery, after serving in the United States Air Force. In his first season bowling, Earl achieved an official league average of 165. By his third season, his average had surged to 217. In 1963, he bowled three PBA summer tournaments in the Pacific Northwest to get a feel for what it would take to successfully compete on the tour. Though he did not cash in any of the three events, he had succeeded in learning how much he would need to improve before he could entertain any idea of going out on the PBA Tour full-time. In order to prepare himself for the tour Anthony practiced between 300 and 350 games a week, up to eight hours a day, and often without any pins (in order to save money). After six years of diligent practice, Anthony began his professional bowling career in January 1970 as a 31-year old rookie. He led that season's first tournament going into the televised finals at Crestview Bowl in Wichita, Kansas, but lost the championship match to Skee Foremsky, finishing in second place.

Anthony won the first of his 43 PBA titles on June 7, 1970, when he defeated Allie Clarke at the Heidelberg Open in Seattle, Washington. His final PBA title was a major — the 1983 Toledo Trust PBA National Championship (until his 1984 ABC Masters title was added retroactively in 2008). Six of his titles were achieved by a pair of improbable "three-peats" in the PBA National Championship, the first three from 1973 to 1975 and the other three from 1981 to 1983. Earl also finished runner-up to fellow lefty Mike Aulby in the 1979 PBA National Championship.

After a nine-month layoff, Anthony won his second ABC Masters tournament in 1984, which at the time was not part of the PBA Tour. Anthony had also won the Masters in 1977. The PBA later added ABC Masters titles as PBA titles, giving Anthony at least one PBA title in 15 consecutive seasons (1970–84). That stood as a PBA record until Walter Ray Williams Jr. won at least one PBA Tour title in 17 consecutive seasons (1993 through 2009–10).

Anthony joined the PBA Senior Tour in 1988 and accumulated another seven titles there, giving him 50 total PBA titles.

By 1988 Anthony had 25 career 300 games. Sadly, not one was on television in the United States; he did, however, bowl two televised 299 games, leaving a solid 9-pin on the last shot in one and a 6-pin on the other. Although he didn't drop to the floor like Don Johnson, Anthony would remark about the 9-pin on a PBA telecast years later, saying, "to this day, I can't believe that pin stood." Earl Anthony did shoot a televised 300 game on national TV in a PBA Tournament in Japan in front of over 50 million viewers.

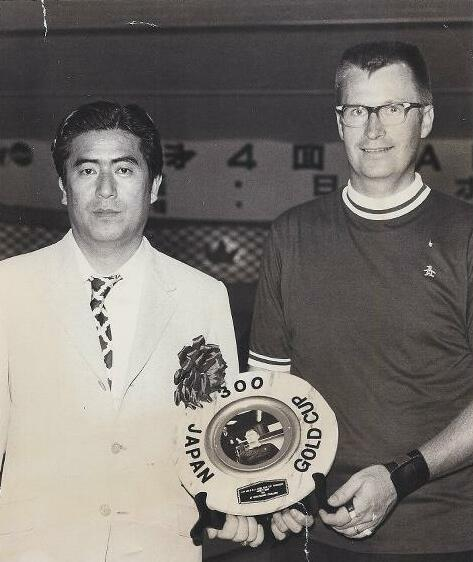
Photo of Earl Anthony holding trophy for shooting 300 on live TV in Japan PBA Tournament

After retiring, Anthony moved to the broadcast booth as a color commentator and operated a bowling center in Dublin, California.

== Personal life and death ==
Anthony was born in Tacoma, Washington to Earl Anthony and Laura Davis. He graduated from Lincoln High School. He was a minor league baseball pitcher with the Baltimore Orioles organization before his days as a professional bowler. He was also an excellent golfer, achieving a near-scratch handicap at the age of 60. He once set the course record at Crow Canyon Country Club in Danville, California with a scratch score of 64.

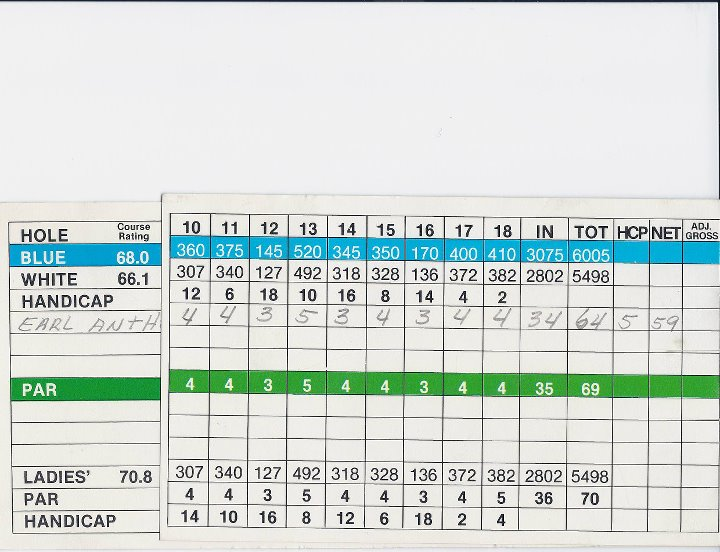
Signed and attested scratch 64 golf score by Earl Anthony

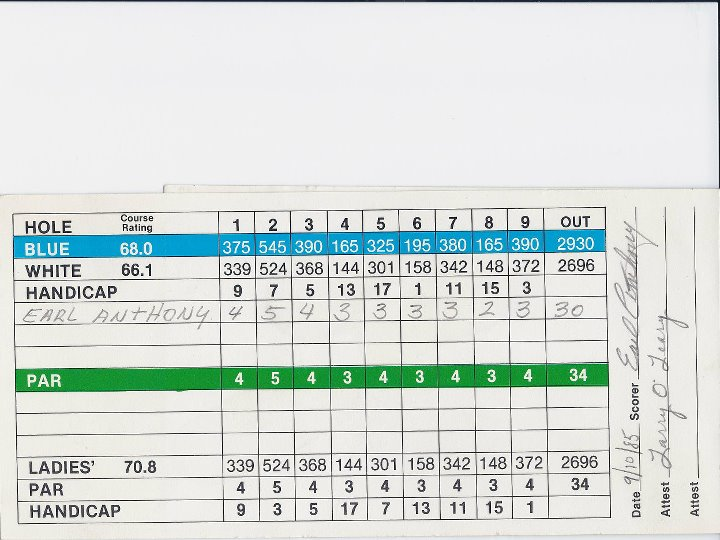
Signed and attested scratch 64 golf score by Earl Anthony

He was married twice. The first time was in 1957 to a girl named Marylou Devish, whom he met in high school and divorced in June 1978. They had a son, Mike, and two daughters, Tracy and Jeri. He later married Susie Shelly in 1980 and they remained married until his death in 2001.

Anthony missed some time on the PBA Tour during the 1978 season after suffering a heart attack in June of that year. Less than three months later he was back on Tour, finishing third in the Waukegan (IL) Open.

Earl Anthony died in 2001 due to head injuries sustained from falling down a flight of stairs at his friend Ed Baur's home in New Berlin, Wisconsin. He was 63 years old.

The "Earl Anthony Memorial Scholarship Fund" was established through funding by the ABC Championship Tournament, in order to provide scholarships to young bowlers. It is now administrated by the Bowling Foundation.

In January 2002, the PBA began the year with a tournament named after Anthony, "The Earl Anthony Memorial Classic." It was first held at TechCity Bowl in Kirkland, Washington. It was won by left-handed pro bowler Parker Bohn III, who beat Patrick Healey, Jr. in the final match 235 to 215. It later moved to Medford, Oregon and re-titled as "The Earl Anthony Medford Classic." In 2010 and 2011, the event took place in Dublin, California and was titled the Earl Anthony Memorial.

== Legacy ==
Anthony was voted into the PBA Hall of Fame in 1981 and the ABC Hall of Fame in 1986. In 2000 he was voted "Master of the Millennium" by a wide margin in a nationwide vote conducted by Bowling Magazine. In a Sports Illustrated Magazine national vote he was named the 2nd Greatest Athlete in the history of the State of Washington (behind only former Gonzaga and NBA star John Stockton).

The late bowling legend Dick Weber dubbed Anthony "the greatest speed-control bowler ever." When Anthony won the 1978 Tournament of Champions to become the first bowler to ever reach 30 titles, Weber was in the broadcast booth and proclaimed Anthony to be "the undisputed King of Bowling." Earl's record of 41 titles stood for 23 years before it was broken by Walter Ray Williams Jr. in 2006, though it increased to 43 in 2008 when the PBA started including ABC Masters titles if they were won by a PBA member. In 15 seasons, Anthony made the top five for the televised final round a record 144 times. Said Bowlers Journal editor Jim Dressel, "When Earl was in the house, everybody else knew there were only four other spots for TV."

In 2008, the PBA celebrated fifty years in existence by commissioning a panel of experts to rank the "50 Greatest Bowlers of the Last 50 Years." Anthony was ranked #1 on the list over Walter Ray Williams Jr., despite the fact that Williams had broken many of Anthony's records. However, Williams himself said, "I feel Earl's record is better than mine because it was more condensed. Earl bowled 14 years and 400 or so events. I’ve bowled well over 600 by now, maybe 700." Williams also added, "When Earl Anthony retired, he didn't have anyone to push him. He probably would have kept going to 50 if that were the case. It's hard to say what would've happened then."

The United States Bowling Congress testing robot for bowling, similar to golf's "Iron Byron," is named "E.A.R.L." (Enhanced Automated Robotic Launcher). The name was given by USBC Junior Gold youth bowler Melissa Stewart of Roswell, Georgia, who said the name was based on Anthony and his "machine-like characteristics." The PBA World Championship now uses the 43-foot Earl Anthony oil pattern, in honor of the man who won the event a record six times.

== Awards and recognition ==
- Six-time BWAA Bowler of the Year (1974–76 and 1981–83)
- Six-time PBA Player of the Year (1974–76 and 1981–83)
- Twelve-time First Team All-American (1972–83)
- Five-time George Young High Average award winner (1973–75, 1980, 1983)
- Established a record for most consecutive PBA seasons winning at least one tournament (15), which stood until 2008 when it was broken by Walter Ray Ray Williams Jr.
- Holds PBA record of 15 televised finals appearances in one season (1975, 1981)
- Holds a record six wins in the PBA National Championship among his ten major tournament titles
- Inducted into PBA Hall of Fame, 1981
- Inducted into ABC (now USBC) Hall of Fame, 1986
- Voted "Bowler of the Millennium" in a 2000 poll conducted by Bowling Digest
- Voted the greatest PBA player ever, when the PBA announced its "50 Greatest Players of the Last 50 Years" list in the 2008–09 season.
- The Earl Anthony Bowl in Dublin, California is named in his honor.
- The PBA's "Earl Anthony 43" oil pattern is used at the PBA World Championship, which he won a record six times. The oil pattern is 43 feet in length in honor of Anthony's 43 PBA Tour titles.

== Career tour titles ==
=== PBA Tour Titles ===
Major championships are in bold text.

1. 1970 Heidelberg Open, Seattle, Washington.
2. 1971 Cougar Open, New York, New York.
3. 1972 Portland Open, Portland, Oregon.
4. 1972 Japan Starlanes Open, Redwood City, California.
5. 1972 American Airlines Open, St. Louis, Missouri.
6. 1973 Seattle Open, Seattle, Washington.
7. 1973 **PBA National Championship**, Oklahoma City, Oklahoma.
8. 1974 **PBA Tournament of Champions**, Akron, Ohio.
9. 1974 **PBA National Championship**, Downey, California.
10. 1974 Home Box Office Open, San Jose, California.
11. 1974 Fresno Open, Fresno, California.
12. 1974 Canada Dry Open, Cleveland, Ohio.
13. 1974 Winston-Salem Hawaiian Invitational, Honolulu, Hawaii.
14. 1975 Greater L.A. Open, Arcadia, California.
15. 1975 Long Island Open, Garden City, New York.
16. 1975 **PBA National Championship**, Downey, California.
17. 1975 Quad Cities Open, Davenport, Iowa.
18. 1975 Jackson Open, Jackson, New Jersey.
19. 1975 Waukegan Open, Waukegan, Illinois.
20. 1975 Buzz Fazio Open, Battle Creek, Michigan.
21. 1976 Midas Open, Windsor Locks, Connecticut.
22. 1976 AMF Dick Weber Five-Star Open, Tamarac, Florida.
23. 1976 Fresno HBO Open, Fresno, California.
24. 1976 Waukegan Open, Waukegan, Illinois.
25. 1976 Buzz Fazio Open, Battle Creek, Michigan
26. 1976 AMF Grand Prix of Bowling, Allen Park, Michigan.
27. 1977 Miller Lite Classic, Torrance, California.
28. 1977 **ABC Masters**, Miami, Florida.
29. 1977 Waukegan Open, Waukegan, Illinois.
30. 1978 AMF Magicscore Open, Kissimmee, Florida.
31. 1978 **PBA Tournament of Champions**, Akron, Ohio.
32. 1979 Long Island Open, Garden City, New York.
33. 1980 Long Island Open, Garden City, New York.
34. 1981 Rolaids Open, Florissant, Missouri.
35. 1981 AMF Magicscore Open, Peoria, Illinois.
36. 1981 **PBA National Championship**, Toledo, Ohio.
37. 1981 Long Island Open, Garden City, New York.
38. 1982 ARC Alameda Open, Alameda, California.
39. 1982 **PBA National Championship**, Toledo, Ohio.
40. 1982 Miller High Life Open, Milwaukee, Wisconsin.
41. 1983 True Value Open, Peoria, Illinois.
42. 1983 **PBA National Championship**, Toledo, Ohio.
43. 1984 **ABC Masters**, Washington, New Jersey.
