= Tom Hess (bowler) =

American professional ten-pin bowler (born 1969)

Personal information
- Born: December 13, 1969 (age 56)

Bowling Information
- Affiliation: PBA
- Rookie year: 2008
- Dominant hand: Right
- Wins: 1 PBA Tour (1 major); 14 PBA50 Tour (5 majors); 12 PBA Regional Tour; 13 PBA50 Regional Tour
- Sponsors: Storm Products, VISE grips

Tom Hess (born December 13, 1969) is a right-handed American professional bowler from Urbandale, Iowa, and is a member of the Professional Bowlers Association (PBA). He now bowls out of Granger, Iowa. Hess is a member of the PBA Hall of Fame in the Veterans/Senior category.

== Bowling career ==
Hess began his PBA career as a Regional Tour player. He was the 2003 PBA Midwest Region Rookie of the Year, the 2010–11 PBA Midwest Region Player of the Year, and the 2025 Midwest Region Senior Player of the Year. To date, he has won 12 PBA Regional and 13 PBA50 Regional titles. He has also been a three-time Iowa state champion.

=== PBA Tour ===
Hess did not bowl full-time on the PBA Tour until 2008. He won the 2011 USBC Masters for not only his first major title, but his first-ever PBA Tour victory. This victory earned him $50,000.

=== PBA50 Tour ===
Hess joined the PBA50 Tour (for players age 50 and older) in 2020, but that season was cancelled due to the COVID-19 pandemic, making 2021 Tom's rookie season. On September 7, 2021, Hess won the PBA50 Senior U.S. Open with a convincing 256–209 victory over PBA Hall of Famer Chris Barnes in the title match. This gave Hess a major title on each of the PBA and PBA50 Tours. On September 19, Hess won his second PBA50 major title at the USBC Senior Masters. Qualifying as the #4 seed, Hess defeated #5 seed Donnie Hogue in the opening match, then went on to defeat three PBA Hall of Famers (Pete Weber, Doug Kent and Chris Barnes) on his way to the title. In the process, Hess wrapped up PBA50 Rookie of the Year and PBA50 Player of the Year honors, becoming the third player (after Tom Baker and Norm Duke) to win both awards in the same season. Hess also joined Dave Soutar and Walter Ray Williams Jr. as the only players in history to win both the USBC Masters and USBC Senior Masters in a career.

Hess participated in the 2022 PBA Tournament of Champions, and was the only senior player to make it to the match play round. On July 3, 2022, Hess won his third PBA50 Tour title at the Highland Park Lanes Open in Greeley, Colorado.

At the inaugural PBA50 World Series of Bowling held in July 2023, Hess made the championship final round of every event. After placing third in the Ballard Championship and second in the Monacelli Championship, he won the Petraglia Championship on July 21. Hess then qualified as the fifth seed for the PBA50 World Championship finals on July 23, but lost the opening match to Chris Barnes, whom he had beaten two days earlier to win the Petraglia Championship. Hess and Barnes met again on August 23 at the PBA50 Fort Myers Lightning Strikes Classic, after Hess climbed the ladder from the #5 seed to face the top qualifier. Hess defeated Barnes again to earn his fifth PBA50 Tour title.

With two majors among his five total titles, Hess became eligible for the PBA Hall of Fame in the Veterans/Senior category. He was voted into the PBA Hall of Fame in February, 2024, and officially inducted at a ceremony in Akron, Ohio on April 27, 2024.

Less than a week after his Hall of Fame induction, Hess won the 2024 PBA50 Granville Financial Open on May 1. Qualifying as the #1 seed, Hess defeated all-time PBA and PBA50 titles leader Walter Ray Williams Jr. in his lone finals match, 257–193. This was Hess' sixth PBA50 title. On May 15, Hess won the PBA50 Fort Myers Lightning Strikes Classic for the second straight year, earning his seventh PBA50 Tour title. On July 26, 2024, Hess won his eighth PBA50 Tour title at the PBA50 Monacelli Championship, part of this season's PBA50 World Series of Bowling in Jackson, Michigan. He climbed a from the #4 seed and survived a three-ball sudden death roll-off against #3 seed Mika Koivuniemi to eventually make it to the final match, where he defeated top seed Larry Verble.

On August 3, 2024, Hess earned his ninth PBA50 Tour title at the PBA/PBA50/PWBA Jonesboro Trios, with partners François Lavoie and Breanna Clemmer. This was the first-ever mixed trios event to award titles to PBA, PBA50 and PWBA players. Hess then reached the ten-title plateau with his third career PBA50 major 12 days later at the PBA50 Tournament of Champions in Fairlawn, Ohio. Despite winning five titles in the 2024 PBA50 season, Hess finished runner-up in Player of the Year points to John Janawicz, who also won five 2024 titles.

On May 21, 2025, Hess won his 11th PBA50 Tour title and fourth major at the Bud Moore PBA50 Players Championship. Hess climbed the ladder from the #5 seed, eventually defeating reigning Player of the Year John Janawicz with a near perfect game in the championship match. Hess rolled the first 11 strikes against Janawicz before leaving two pins on his final shot for a 298–235 victory.

At the 2026 PBA50 World Series of Bowling, Hess won the PBA50 Petraglia Championship for the second time in his career, having previously won the event in 2023. The 257–228 victory over Ron Hurt in the final match gave Hess his 12th PBA50 Tour title. On May 24, 2026, Hess won the PBA50 Senior U.S. Open for the second time in his career. He climbed the stepladder, defeating Ricky Schissler, Andres Gomez and Tom Daugherty, before finishing with a 249–197 final match victory over Chris Barnes, giving Hess five PBA50 majors among his 13 titles. On July 14, 2026, he won the PBA50 Akron Classic, knocking off Tom Daugherty in the semifinal match before defeating Michael Clark Jr. in the title match. With 14 total PBA50 victories, he now stands in second place on the all-time PBA50 titles list, tied with John Handegard (14) and Pete Weber (14), with all three behind Walter Ray Williams Jr. (16).

Hess is currently sponsored by Storm Bowling, having previously been a member of the Brunswick pro staff. He is also sponsored by VISE grips.

=== Amateur ===
Hess has also bowled for Senior Team USA. In December, 2023, he competed for his country at the International Bowling Federation World Senior Championships in Cali, Colombia.

== Professional titles ==
Major titles are in bold text.

=== PBA Tour titles ===
1. **2011 USBC Masters** (Reno, NV)

=== PBA50 Tour titles ===
1. **2021 PBA50 Senior U.S. Open** (Brentwood, CA)
2. **2021 USBC Senior Masters** (Las Vegas, NV)
3. 2022 PBA50 Highland Park Lanes Open (Greeley, CO)
4. 2023 PBA50 WSOB Petraglia Championship (Jackson, MI)
5. 2023 PBA50 Fort Myers Lightning Strikes Classic (Fort Myers, FL)
6. 2024 PBA50 Granville Financial Open (Aberdeen, NC)
7. 2024 PBA50 Fort Myers Lightning Strikes Classic (Fort Myers, FL)
8. 2024 PBA50 Monacelli Championship (Jackson, MI)
9. 2024 PBA/PBA50/PWBA Jonesboro Trios w/François Lavoie and Breanna Clemmer (Jonesboro, AR)
10. **2024 PBA50 Tournament of Champions** (Fairlawn, OH)
11. **2025 Bud Moore PBA50 Players Championship** (Woodbridge, Virginia)
12. 2026 PBA50 WSOB Petraglia Championship (Lakeville, MN)
13. **2026 PBA50 Senior U.S. Open** (Greeley, CO)
14. 2026 PBA50 Akron Classic (Akron, OH)

== Personal ==
Hess also works in the sod industry, and has served as an analyst/color commentator for live PBA tournament coverage on BowlTV, the USBC's YouTube channel.
