= 1999 PBA Tour season =

PBA Bowling Tour: 1999 Season
- League: Professional Bowlers Association
- Sport: Ten-pin bowling
- Duration: January 10 – November 17, 1999

PBA Tour
- Season MVP: Parker Bohn III

PBA Tour seasons
- ← 1998 2000 →

This is a recap of the 1999 season for the Professional Bowlers Association (PBA) Tour. It was the tour's 41st season, and consisted of 26 events.

Parker Bohn III collected five titles during the season to take PBA Player of the Year honors, ending Walter Ray Williams, Jr.'s streak of three straight POY awards.

Tim Criss secured a major title at the PBA National Championship. Amateur Brian Boghosian took the title at the ABC Masters, while Bob Learn, Jr. won his first career major at Bowling's U.S. Open. Jason Couch collected $100,000 in winning the season-ending Brunswick World Tournament of Champions among his two titles on the year.

During the season, Steve Jaros and Mike Miller rolled the 13th and 14th (respectively) televised 300 games in PBA history. Another highlight of the season was the PBA's first-ever outdoor finals at the NYC PBA Experience, which took place on specially-built lanes in mid-town Manhattan's Bryant Park.

== Tournament schedule ==
Event	City	Dates	Winner
National Bowling Stadium National/Senior Doubles	Reno, Nevada	Jan 10–15	Jason Hurd (1), Johnny Petraglia
Albuquerque Open	Albuquerque, New Mexico	Jan 19–23	Brian Himmler (1)
PBA Don Carter Classic	Dallas, Texas	Jan 26–30	Mike Miller (3)
Columbia 300 Open	Austin, Texas	Feb 2–6	Parker Bohn III (18)
Chattanooga Open	Chattanooga, Tennessee	Feb 9–13	Steve Jaros (3)
Flagship Open	Erie, Pennsylvania	Feb 16–20	Chris Barnes (1)
PBA National Championship	Toledo, Ohio	Feb 21–27	Tim Criss (5)
Empire State Open	Latham, New York	Apr 13–17	Parker Bohn III (19)
Brunswick Johnny Petraglia Open	North Brunswick, New Jersey	Apr 20–24	Doug Kent (3)
Brunswick Long Island/NYC PBA Experience	Sayville, New York; New York, New York	Apr 27 – May 1	Eric Forkel (5)
ABC Masters	Syracuse, New York	May 3–8	Brian Boghosian (amateur)
Bayer/Brunswick Touring Players Championship	Akron, Ohio	May 10–15	Steve Hoskins (9)
PBA Oregon Open	Portland, Oregon	May 25–29	Chris Barnes (2)
Showboat Invitational	Las Vegas, Nevada	May 31 – Jun 5	Parker Bohn III (20)
Tucson Open	Tucson, Arizona	Jun 8–12	Walter Ray Williams, Jr. (30)
National Bowling Stadium Open	Reno, Nevada	Jun 13–20	Ricky Ward (4)
AC Delco All-Star Classic	Lakewood, California	Jun 21–26	Tommy Delutz, Jr. (1)
Bowling's U.S. Open	Uncasville, Connecticut	Jul 24 – Aug 1	Bob Learn, Jr. (4)
Oronamin C Japan Cup	Tokyo, Japan	Sep 16–19	Parker Bohn III (21)
AC Delco Challenge	Virginia Beach, Virginia	Oct 2–6	Mark Mosayebi (1)
Brunswick Pro Source Open	Wichita, Kansas	Oct 9–12	Rick Lawrence (1)
Track/Dexter Open	Canandaigua, New York	Oct 16–20	Parker Bohn III (22)
Greater Detroit Open	Taylor, Michigan	Oct 23–27	Dave Wodka (1)
Bay City Classic	Bay City, Michigan	Oct 30 – Nov 3	Jason Couch (6)
Indianapolis Open	Indianapolis, Indiana	Nov 6–10	Randy Pedersen (12)
Brunswick World Tournament of Champions	Overland Park, Kansas	Nov 13–17	Jason Couch (7)
