= Wayne Webb =

American ten-pin bowler (born 1957)

Personal information
- Born: August 4, 1957 (age 69) Rehoboth, Massachusetts, U.S.
- Years active: 1976–present

Bowling Information
- Affiliation: PBA
- Rookie year: 1976
- Dominant hand: Right (tweener delivery)
- Wins: 20 PBA Tour (1 major); 5 PBA50 Tour (3 majors); 13 PBA Regional Tour

Wayne Webb (born August 4, 1957) is an American professional bowler from Rehoboth, Massachusetts. He was known mostly for his success from the late 1970s to the end of the 1980s, when he won 17 of his 20 PBA Tour titles in a 12-season stretch. Webb is one of only 17 players in history to win at least 20 PBA Tour titles, and is a member of both the PBA and USBC Halls of Fame.

== PBA career ==
=== PBA Tour ===
The son of a bowling center operator, Webb knew from age twelve that "all I ever wanted to be was a professional bowler." He was eighteen when he got his wish and joined the PBA (Professional Bowlers Association) tour in late 1975. He found success quickly, winning his first tournament at age 21 and earning "Player of the Year" honors by age 23. On November 2, 1982, Webb won the Columbia 300 Open in Sterling Heights, Michigan to become one of the youngest players in PBA history (25 years, 90 days) to reach ten career PBA titles. Webb remains the fifth-youngest player to reach ten titles as of 2026, behind Pete Weber (24 years, 247 days), Marshall Holman, Mike Aulby, and Anthony Simonsen.

Webb was one of the PBA's first 10 career "millionaires." Webb captured 20 career PBA titles, including his lone major championship at the 1980 PBA Tournament of Champions. He was named PBA Player of the Year in 1980, the only player not named Earl Anthony or Mark Roth to win that award in an 11-season stretch (1974–1984). He became a member of the PBA Hall of Fame in 1993.

Webb's 20th and final PBA Tour title came in 1997 at the Bud Light Championship, where he defeated future Hall of Famer Amleto Monacelli in the final match. This was the second title for Webb in 1997, marking the first time he had won multiple titles in a season since 1985. The 20 titles puts Webb in a 14th-place tie with fellow PBA Hall of Famers Dick Ritger, Tommy Jones and Monacelli. A panel of bowling experts selected by the PBA ranked Webb #18 on their 2008 list of "50 Greatest Players of the Last 50 Years."

From 2000 on, Webb had major personal and professional problems, including suffering through a gambling addiction and his third divorce, and his bowling career began a steady decline. His final appearance in a televised PBA Tour championship round was February 9, 2002 at the Columbia 300 Tar Heel Open. After being eliminated during qualifying at the 2005 PBA World Championship, Webb quit the PBA Tour and professional bowling as a whole. Webb's appearance in the Ten-pin movie/documentary A League of Ordinary Gentlemen documents this time and features Webb's candid comments on this period of his life. While the film had a mostly positive message about how Steve Miller and three Microsoft executives had rescued bowling from bankruptcy, Webb lamented the effects of the all-exempt PBA Tour on veteran players like himself, stating what it felt like to "give an entire life to something on the belief that it will never end, and then to watch it end anyway." He has appeared only in selected events on the PBA Tour since that time. He bowled at the PBA 2008 H&R Block Tournament of Champions along with several other past TOC winners who were invited.

=== PBA50 Tour ===
In 2008, Wayne Webb joined the PBA Senior Tour (now called PBA50 Tour). On June 20, Webb won the 2008 Senior U.S. Open, defeating Johnny Petraglia 204–172 in the championship match. This was only his second ever Senior Tour event. Webb was named 2008 PBA Senior Rookie of the Year. On winning this award, he commented: "Obviously it's a great honor. Being on the Tour for 30 years, quitting for three years, and then coming back on the Senior Tour this year and doing as well as I did, it kind of re-sparked my life with bowling again."

Webb repeated as Senior U.S. Open Champion in 2009. On June 18, 2010, Webb won his third PBA Senior Tour major, capturing the USBC Senior Masters in the final three-game match, 705–628, over reigning PBA Player of the Year, Walter Ray Williams, Jr. Webb's victory denied Williams the chance to become just the second bowler in history to win both the USBC Masters and USBC Senior Masters in a career. (PBA Hall of Famer Dave Soutar was the only player to win both until Williams, Jr. finally won a Senior Masters in 2014.)

Following his win in the August 2010 PBA Senior Jackson Open, his third title of the season, Webb was named 2010 PBA Senior Player of the Year. This made him just the second bowler in history (after Mark Roth) to win both PBA and Senior PBA Player of the Year awards in a career.

== PBA titles ==
Over his career, Webb made the final championship match 36 times in PBA Tour events, winning the title in 20 of those matches. Major championships are in bold type.

=== PBA Tour titles ===
1. 1978 Brunswick World Open (Glendale Heights, Illinois)
2. 1979 Waukegan Open (Waukegan, Illinois)
3. 1979 Buffalo Open (Cheektowaga, New York)
4. 1980 Showboat Invitational (Las Vegas, Nevada)
5. **1980 Firestone Tournament of Champions** (Akron, Ohio)
6. 1980 Kessler Classic (Greenwood, Indiana)
7. 1981 Fair Lanes Open (Baltimore, Maryland)
8. 1981 Greater Hartford Open (Windsor Locks, Connecticut)
9. 1982 Waukegan Open (Waukegan, Illinois)
10. 1982 Columbia 300 Open (Sterling Heights, Michigan)
11. 1983 Greater Miami Sunshine Open (Miami, Florida)
12. 1983 Brunswick World Open (Glendale Heights, Illinois)
13. 1984 Rolaids Open (Anaheim, California)
14. 1984 Kessler Open (Dublin, California)
15. 1985 Lite Beer Championship (Milwaukee, Wisconsin)
16. 1985 Fair Lanes Open (Baltimore, Maryland)
17. 1989 True Value Open (Peoria, Illinois)
18. 1996 Peoria Open (Peoria, Illinois)
19. 1997 Peoria Open (Peoria, Illinois)
20. 1997 Bud Light Championship (Lake Grove, New York)

=== PBA50 Tour titles ===
1. **2008 Senior U.S. Open** (Las Vegas, Nevada)
2. **2009 Senior U.S. Open** (Las Vegas, Nevada)
3. 2010 PBA Senior Columbus Open (Columbus, Ohio)
4. **2010 USBC Senior Masters** (Las Vegas, Nevada)
5. 2010 PBA Senior Jackson Open (Jackson, Michigan)

=== Awards and recognition ===
- 1980 PBA Player of the Year
- Ranked 18th on the PBA's 2008 poll "50 Greatest Players of the Last 50 Years"
- 2008 PBA Senior Rookie of the Year
- 2010 PBA Senior Player of the Year

== Additional career information ==
Webb bought Rainbow Lanes in Columbus, Ohio in 2010, which was subsequently renamed Wayne Webb's Columbus Bowl, and for several years ran a karaoke business on the side. Wayne Webb's Columbus Bowl hosted the 2016 Barbasol PBA Players Championship. (Sponsor Barbasol is owned by Perio Inc., based in nearby Dublin, Ohio.) In August 2016, the PBA and Barbasol announced they had reached a partnership agreement to return the PBA Players Championship to Wayne Webb's Columbus Bowl for the next two seasons (2017 and 2018). Webb participated in the 2017 Players Championship and finished 72nd out of 113 entrants, missing the match play cut. The Players Championship also returned to Wayne Webb's Columbus Bowl for the 2019 and 2020 PBA Tour seasons. It also hosted the inaugural PBA60 World Series of Bowling in 2025, where the Wayne Webb Classic is conducted on the eponymous oil pattern.
