= Dave Soutar =

Retired American ten-pin bowler (born 1940)

Personal information
- Born: March 7, 1940 (age 86)

Bowling Information
- Affiliation: PBA, PBA50
- Rookie year: 1961
- Dominant hand: Right (stroker delivery)
- Wins: 18 PBA Tour (2 majors); 7 PBA Senior Tour (3 majors)
- Sponsors: Brunswick

David Soutar (born March 7, 1940) is a retired professional ten-pin bowler who competed on the Professional Bowlers Association (PBA) Tour. He won 18 times on the regular PBA Tour, and seven more times on the PBA Senior Tour (now known as the PBA50 Tour). Soutar was raised on the east side of Detroit, Michigan and is now a resident of Bradenton, Florida. He is a member of the PBA and USBC Halls of Fame.

== Career ==
A 1958 graduate of Denby High School, Soutar developed his bowling talent at many of Detroit's bowling alleys, leading to his pro career beginning with a bang in 1961. In just his fifth tournament as a pro, he won the 1961 PBA National Championship major at age 21. His only other PBA major title came in the 1973 ABC Masters (now USBC Masters). He had a career best year in 1970, leading the Tour with five titles, finishing third in earnings, and claiming the PBA's Steve Nagy Sportsmanship Award. The season was highlighted by a furious finish, in which Soutar won three of the final six events. However, he was beaten out for 1970 PBA Player of the Year by Nelson Burton Jr., who won four titles and led the Tour in average. Soutar would call the Player of the Year snub the biggest disappointment in his professional career.

Soutar was a 1979 inductee into the PBA Hall of Fame. He won his final regular PBA Tour title at the 1982 Syracuse Open. He was elected to the USBC Hall of Fame in 1985.

Soutar continued his success at the senior level, capturing major championships at the 1999 Senior Tournament of Champions, 2000 USBC Senior Masters and 2003 Senior U.S. Open. He is the first PBA player to win both the USBC Masters and USBC Senior Masters in a career, a feat repeated only twice since then, by Walter Ray Williams Jr. (2014) and Tom Hess (2021). He is also one of only eight bowlers to win a regular or Senior PBA title in five different decades (joining Dick Weber, Johnny Petraglia, Walter Ray Williams Jr., Pete Weber, Amleto Monacelli, Parker Bohn III and Norm Duke). In 2011, Soutar set the all-time record for Senior PBA Tour appearances when he bowled in his 250th event in Dayton, Ohio. In addition to winning the 1970 Steve Nagy Sportsmanship Award on the regular PBA Tour, Soutar won the Dick Weber Sportsmanship Award on the Senior PBA Tour following the 2012 season (his 51st and final season as a pro), thus becoming the only player to win a sportsmanship award on both tours.

Dave was ranked 20th on the PBA's 2008 list of "50 Greatest Players of the Last 50 Years", which celebrated the organization's 50th anniversary. His career earnings (with senior events included) are over US$1.2 million.

=== PBA Tour titles ===
Major championships are in bold text.

1. **1961 Second Annual PBA National Championship** (Cleveland, OH)
2. 1965 Pikes Peak Open (Colorado Springs, CO)
3. 1967 Fort Worth Open (Fort Worth, TX)
4. 1968 Denver Open (Denver, CO)
5. 1969 American Airlines Open (Detroit, MI)
6. 1970 Showboat Invitational (Las Vegas, NV)
7. 1970 Waukegan Open (Waukegan, IL)
8. 1970 Bellows-Valvair Open (St. Louis, MO)
9. 1970 Lincoln Open (Lincoln, NE)
10. 1970 American Airlines Open (Detroit, MI)
11. 1971 Greater Los Angeles Open (Arcadia, CA)
12. 1971 Miller High Life Open (Milwaukee, WI)
13. **1973 ABC Masters** (Syracuse, NY)
14. 1973 Home Box Office Open (Portland, OR)
15. 1974 Home Box Office Open (Buffalo, NY)
16. 1976 Miller High Life Open (Milwaukee, WI)
17. 1981 Aqua Fest Mr. Gatti’s Open (Austin, TX)
18. 1982 Syracuse Open (Syracuse, NY)

== Personal ==
Dave Soutar and his wife Judy are one of the few successful husband-and-wife bowling duos. Judy Soutar was an eight-time champion on the women's professional tour and, like Dave, is a member of the USBC Hall of Fame.
