= Bowling form =

Manner of throwing the ball in ten-pin bowling

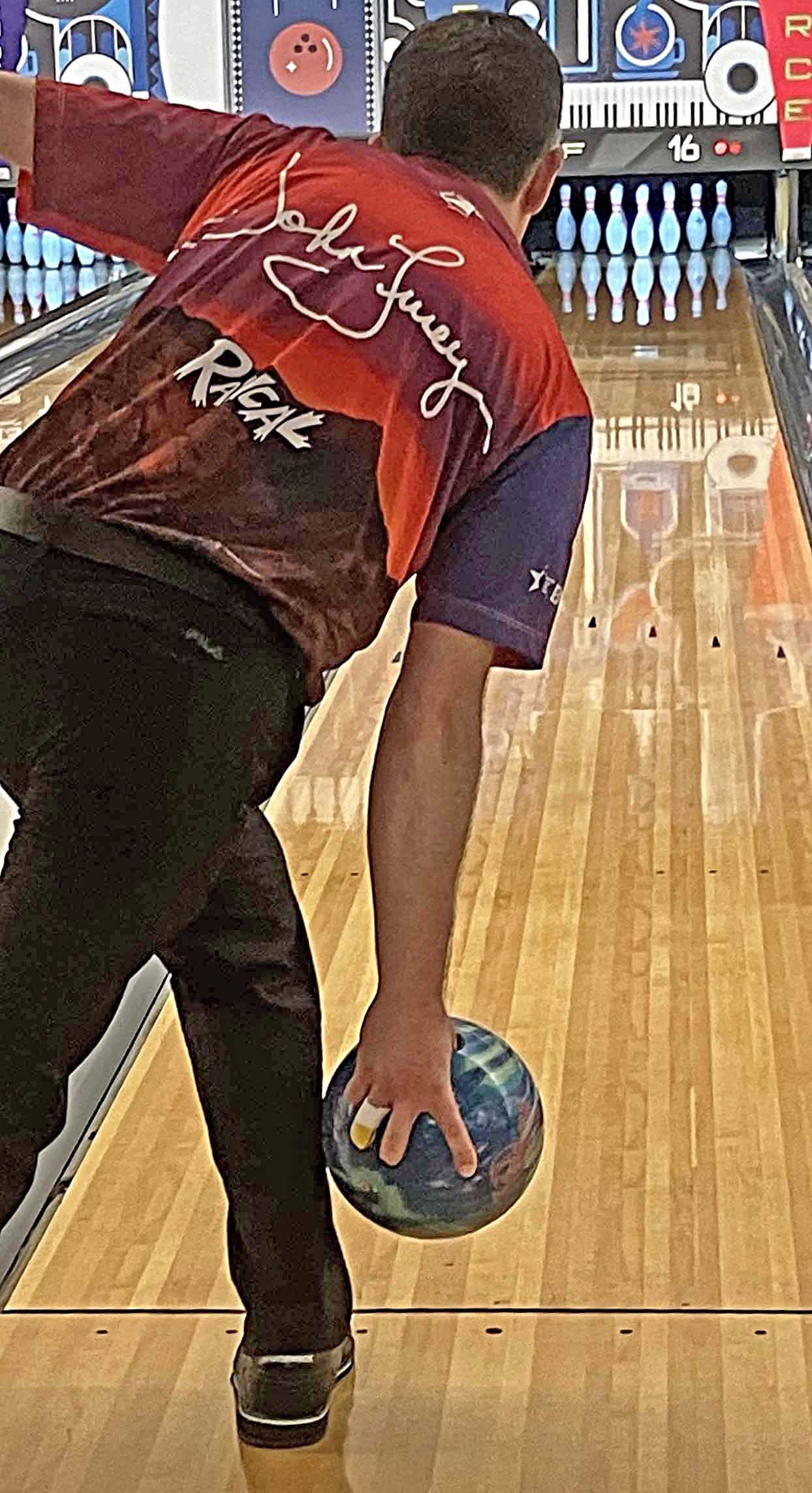
PBA bowler John Furey demonstrates a conventional (one-handed) delivery, which involves the thumb and two fingers of one hand. Finger rotation surrounding the instant of delivery can induce axis rotation (side rotation), causing the ball to hook (curve).

In the sport of ten-pin bowling, there are many different ways in which to deliver (known as a "throw" or "roll") the bowling ball in order to advance it toward the pins in an accurate and powerful manner. Generally, there are three basic forms of 10-pin bowling. The most basic form is known as stroking, which is the most classic form. The most powerful form is known as cranking, which imparts great leverage and maximum rotation on the ball, but sacrifices accuracy. In between the two is the domain of the tweener, who has characteristics of both, but does not truly fit into either category. A well-known variant of "tweening" is the power stroker.

Power stroking is often very similar to cranking and bowlers can often fit in either category, therefore bowlers that use one of these two styles are often simply known as power players. A fourth style, known as helicopter, spinning, or UFO, is a style that is used to great effect in Asia. Finally, many modern bowlers have changed to a one- or two-handed no-thumb delivery. Most of the various forms use different wrist and hand positions and rely on different timings and body positions to accommodate the differences in each style of release.

== Conventional bowling form ==
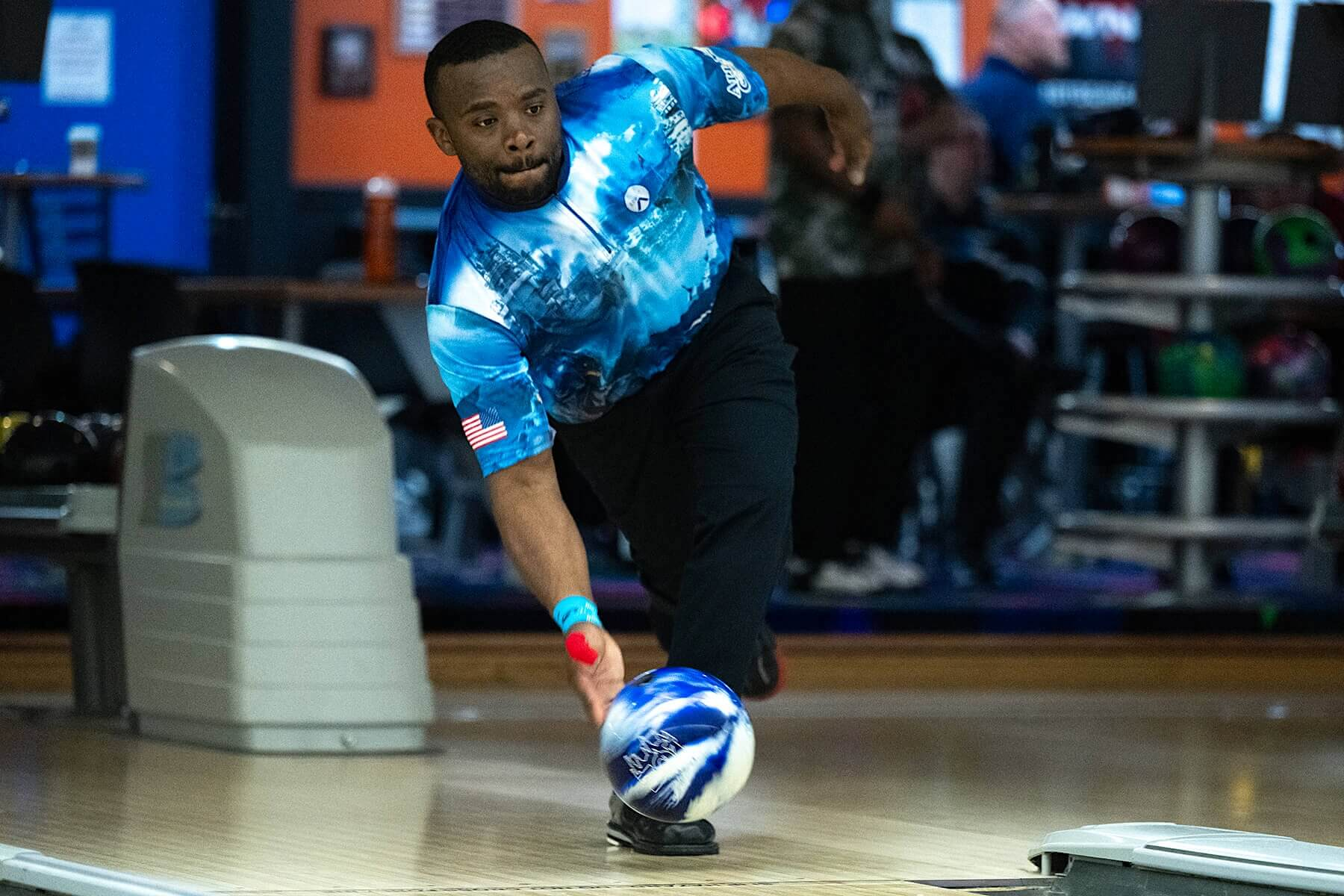
A ten-pin bowler uses a one-hand delivery with thumb having exited the ball before fingers, to achieve axis rotation.

A conventional roll of the bowling ball will enter the 1-3 pocket, and continue to roll from right-to-left (right-hander.) The ball only contacts four pins (1, 3, 5 and 9 pins) to achieve a strike. This type of roll/hit applies to strokers, power strokers and crankers.

A conventional bowling form is the most commonly used method in 10-pin bowling. There are many styles that can be used in a conventional bowling form. However, all of the styles have one thing in common: the method in which to achieve a strike.

The following describes a strike for a right-handed bowler. A strike in conventional bowling is a specific method of knocking down all of the pins on the first ball. A conventional strike is when the ball utilizes the one-three pocket. A pocket is the area fronting the one and three pins.

There are countless ways a bowler can achieve a strike. However, the goal for a bowler on every first ball is to achieve a strike using the method that generates the highest strike percentage. A perfect strike is a strike where the ball hits only four pins: the one, three, five and nine pins. The ball enters the one-three pocket, and then falls into the pit area to the right of where the eight pin previously stood.

=== Stroking ===
A stroker is a type of player in ten-pin bowling who releases their bowling ball in a smooth manner. They typically have rev rates less than 300 rpm. Strokers often keep their shoulders square to the foul line and their backswing generally does not go much above parallel to the ground. This type of release reduces the ball's rate of revolution, thus decreasing its hook potential and hitting power. Strokers rely on finesse and accuracy, as opposed to crankers, who use speed and power. However, today's modern reactive resin bowling balls now allow strokers to hit the "pocket" at a relatively high angle. Stroking is considered the most classic of all the bowling forms and is still the most popular style of bowling in the PBA.

Although crankers are often considered to be more impressive to watch, strokers are often considered to have more repeatable and accurate shots. Strokers rely on smooth ball placement more than kinetic energy to fell pins. The all-time leader in titles and bowling earnings in the United States, Walter Ray Williams, Jr., is a stroker (though some consider his style unique and not easily classifiable). Other famous strokers include PBA Hall of Famers Norm Duke, David Ozio, and Dick Weber.

Several high-profile left-handed bowlers, such as Hall of Famers Earl Anthony, Mike Aulby, Parker Bohn III and Mike Scroggins have used a stroker release, which has led to a stereotype in the bowling community that most left-handers are strokers who can only play the outside part of the lane. Part of this is due to the fact that the left side of the lane tends to have more oil due to less activity, forcing players to the outside of the lane to find friction.

=== Tweening ===
A tweener (a term derived from "in-between") is a bowler who delivers the ball in a manner that falls somewhere in between stroking and cranking. They have rev rates between 300 and 370 rpm. This modified delivery could use a higher backswing than is normally employed by a pure stroker or a less powerful wrist position than a pure cranker. Some use the term to refer to a bowler who is simply not a "picture perfect" example of either a stroker or a cranker.

Notable tweeners include Brian Voss (primarily a stroker, but not "picture perfect"), Mika Koivuniemi (primarily a stroker, but with a high backswing), and Doug Kent (considered by some to be a power stroker). A more modern example of a tweener is Andrew Anderson (high backswing with a stroker's timing).

=== Power stroking ===
A variation on tweening is used by a very successful and well-known bowler, Pete Weber, who is considered a power stroker. This term refers to a bowler who relies on a high backswing and open shoulders to generate potential ball speed and a big hook, but uses the timing of a stroker. Weber's release imparts a high degree of axis rotation and very little axis tilt. A power stroker's release is both smooth and powerful, generating many revolutions via a wrist snap or flick of the fingers, without muscling the armswing like a cranker would. Some other prominent power strokers include Bryan Goebel, Wes Malott, Dick Allen, Dominic Barrett, Doug Kent (often considered a tweener), and Chris Barnes (often considered a stroker). Among women bowlers, Jillian Martin is considered a power stroker, combining a high backswing and strong rev rate with a stroker's timing.

=== Cranking/power player ===
E.J. Tackett lofts the ball over the left channel.

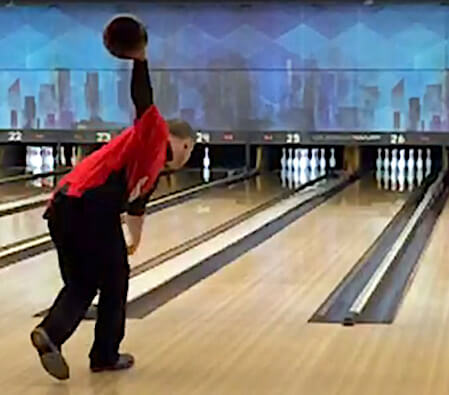
Bowlers using a high backswing (shown) are generally considered crankers.

A cranker or power player is a bowler who strives to generate revolutions using a cupped wrist or excessive wrist action. They typically have revolution rates over 400 rpm. Crankers who rely on wrist action may have a high backswing and open their shoulders to generate ball speed. These bowlers often cup the wrist, but open the wrist at the top of the swing. Mark Roth was among the first bowlers to crank the ball using a high backswing and excessive wrist action. Crankers may also muscle the ball with a bent elbow because their wrist is not strong enough to be cupped at the release. Crankers often use "late" timing, where the foot gets to the foul line before the ball; a technique known as plant and pull, hardly using any slide on their final step and pulling the ball upwards for leverage. The timing between the feet and the ball being delivered is only a fraction of a second. Even though the plant and pull bowler is sometimes used as another name for a cranker, it is rather misleading because some crankers slide more, while bowlers with other styles can also use this technique.

The term "cranking" is used to describe the style of release and heavy wrist action that typifies crankers. Because of the high rev rate and power crankers have, they can throw powerful strikes even on less-than-perfect hits, but are more prone to splits rarely left by strokers or otherwise. The myth that crankers are not good spare shooters is not always supported. Roth, for example, was one of the best spare shooters on tour in his day, and was the first person to convert the nearly-impossible 7-10 split on national television. Robert Smith and Jason Couch also both posted very high spare-conversion percentages. Due to the intensive nature of their release, cranking is sometimes viewed as physically detrimental long-term such that some bowlers transition to a tweener/power stroker release. Because many bowlers have a style that can be described as a cranker or a power stroker, the term power player is used for any bowler who can generate high revolutions or ball speed.

Crankers sometimes stand to the extreme opposite side of the approach (relative to their target), and roll the ball over the middle lane boards out toward the gutter, using high revolutions to hook the ball back toward the pocket; this line is called "deep inside", "coast to coast", or "hooking the whole lane". Depending on the bowling ball, lane condition and bowler, the ball may exhibit either a rounded hook pattern or a later, more severe hook pattern known as skid-snap or skid-flip.

Some crankers use a low backswing but have a cupped wrist in order to generate high revolutions; this was the "old-fashioned" way of cranking. Notable bowlers with such a style include Harry Smith, Jim Godman, Bob Learn, Jr., Ryan Shafer, Kelly Coffman, and Bob Vespi. Older commentary have also referred to such crankers as "twisters". Other bowlers who followed Roth's style of a cupped wrist and high backswing include Amleto Monacelli, Jason Couch and, more recently, E. J. Tackett. Cranking is uncommon among female players – notable players include Michelle Feldman and Daria Pająk. Bowlers like Robert Smith, Mike Fagan, and Tommy Jones are often considered crankers due to their high backswings and RPM rates, but each has a smooth release and slide, so they can also be classified as power strokers.

==== Ball speed ====
Bowling ball delivery speed is affected primarily by three factors: gravity, the bowler's forward speed, and downswing acceleration. A longer arm or higher backswing height increases the speed that gravity produces. Forward momentum is also imparted to the ball by the bowler's walking speed. Finally, deliberate forward acceleration of the arm during the downswing affects delivery speed.

== Spinning ==
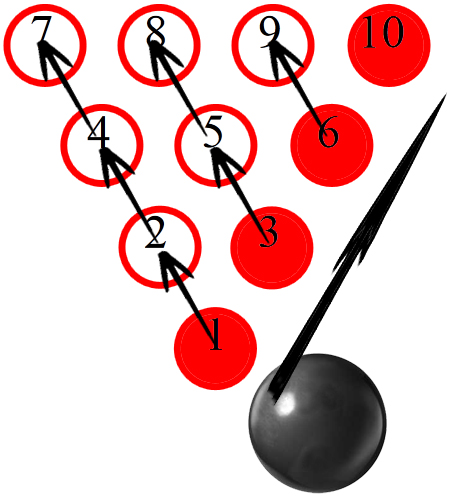
A spinning movement of the bowling ball will actually spin away from the 1-pin (right-hander) as it hits it, and then continues the left-to-right direction by hitting the 3, 6 and 10 pins. This type of hit causes a domino effect on the entire rack.

Spinners use a style of release known variously as spinning, helicopter, or UFO. Regardless of what it's known as, a spinner releases a ball such that it is rotating around the vertical axis in a counter clockwise motion (right-hander, and viewed from above) as it moves down the lane. A spinner generates around 90 degrees of axis tilt and virtually no axis (side) rotation. Spinning is a popular style in Asia, especially Taiwan, where lanes are usually oiled from the foul line to the pin rack, and present little to no opportunity for a ball thrown in one of the three more orthodox fashions to find friction on any part of the lane. A hook needs friction, in order to allow the ball to "grab" the lane. In spinning, very little of the ball's surface touches the lane, which is what the spinner intends. Spinning does not require friction of any kind, though due to the hand position at release, most spinners exhibit a slight backup hook relative to their bowling hand. Notable spinners include Su-Feng Tseng and Chien-Ming Yang from Taiwan who won the 1997 and 1998 AMF World Cup, as well as Jianchao Du from China who won the IBF World Cup 2025 Men's Singles.

The objective in spinning is to depend more on pin deflection (pins hitting other pins) than "carry" (the ball knocking down the pins.) For a right-handed bowler, the ball proceeds down the lane, usually using a left-to-right line, and strikes the right side of the 1-pin. At this point, the ball will proceed to move down the front row of pins in the direction opposite its spin - the 1-3-6-10 pins. This type of a hit is referred to as "riding the rail" among spinners. A properly thrown spinner will hit the pocket in a way as if the ball was spinning away from the 1-pin. Conventional bowlers who watch this type of spin will actually think the bowler threw a backup ball, though any hook on the ball tends to be unintentional. As the ball moves down the row, it creates a domino effect. The 1-pin hits the 2-4-7, the 3-pin hits the 5-8 the 6-pin hits the 9, and the ball eventually hits the 10-pin alone. Even when the ball hits Brooklyn, the reversal of direction allows even more ball and pin deflection (known as "mixing"), allowing a higher chance of messenger strikes.

Because spinners do not want the ball to grab onto the lane with its surface, they often use "plastic" bowling balls - balls with the older polyester cover-stock popular in the 1970s and 1980s, and commonly used as house balls today - in comparison to the widely used polyurethane, "particle" (polyurethane with nigh-microscopic glass spheres or other hard material throughout the coverstock) and "reactive resin" balls ("reactive resin" is itself polyurethane manufactured using a process to leave microscopic pores throughout it, essentially, a hard sponge) used by bowlers who desire a ball that will grip the lane and roll strongly. However, reactive resin balls (usually variants lacking a core sold in Asia) are sometimes used to minimize ball deflection and maintain a strong finish as the ball hits the pins. Additionally, because the chances of injury are somewhat elevated with this style of bowling, as well as the advantage of ball deflection with this style, the spinner will have a tendency to use lightweight balls between ten and twelve pounds.

Some hook bowlers can also spin and roll the ball at the same time, keeping the ball in-between the X and Y axis. Such a release may impart more ball deflection and pin action, but may also lead the ball to react later with less hook, unless it is drilled in a configuration to compensate for the additional axis tilt. Tom Baker, Wayne Garber, and Ryan Shafer of the PBA Tour, and Miki Nishimura of the JPBA exhibit higher axis tilt than most hook bowlers.

In tournaments within countries like Taiwan where they use house conditions, spinning can be an advantage over rolling. However, when tournaments use the more conventional oil patterns, where the oil is laid from the foul line to about 40 feet, and is dry up to the pin rack, spinning loses its advantage since friction exists. Carry is also a more reliable and consistent technique of knocking pins down on the first ball, as spinning is less predictable in terms of pin deflection, and at times can result in odd leaves - including the 5-pin and wash-outs when missing the 1-pin.

== Other bowling forms ==
=== No-thumb delivery ===
A no-thumb delivery involves inserting only two fingers into the bowling ball, leaving the thumb on the outside of the ball, in an effort to create more revolutions and greater hook. Due to similar ball roll and revolutions to the cranker style, it is sometimes considered a variation of cranking. As the bowler does not use the opposite hand to support the ball (as in the two-handed approach), the wrist is often severely cupped and/or the ball is balanced on the forearm and delivered using a bent elbow throughout the shot. Another variation of this delivery is to palm the ball forcing the thumb to the side of the ball while forcing the elbow to lock so as to keep the arm straight and generate a back-swing. This variation leads to far greater consistency and straightens the ball out when needed. All styles of no-thumbing usually require bowlers to use bowling balls that are generally one to three pounds lighter than their thumb-in counterparts.

This technique is often used by casual or league-level bowlers who have not learned how to hook the ball using one of the more standard, thumb-in grips. It is also prevalent among left-handed bowlers using house balls. A left-handed bowler would have to reverse the ball in order to properly use the holes typically drilled for right-handed bowlers. Notable bowlers to use this technique at the professional level include Mike Miller and Tom Daugherty.

=== Half-thumb variation ===
The half-thumb variation is a technique employed by Tom Smallwood, the surprise winner of the 2009 PBA World Championship, and involves putting the thumb in the ball only up to the first knuckle. Thus, the ball is thrown almost entirely with the fingers as a "no thumb" bowler would throw it, with the thumb only providing some control during the backswing. Smallwood also keeps two hands on the bowling ball until roughly midway through his approach.

=== Two-handed approach ===
Video: the two-handed approach (Zach Wilkins, 2019) usually involves holding the torso lower than a conventional release

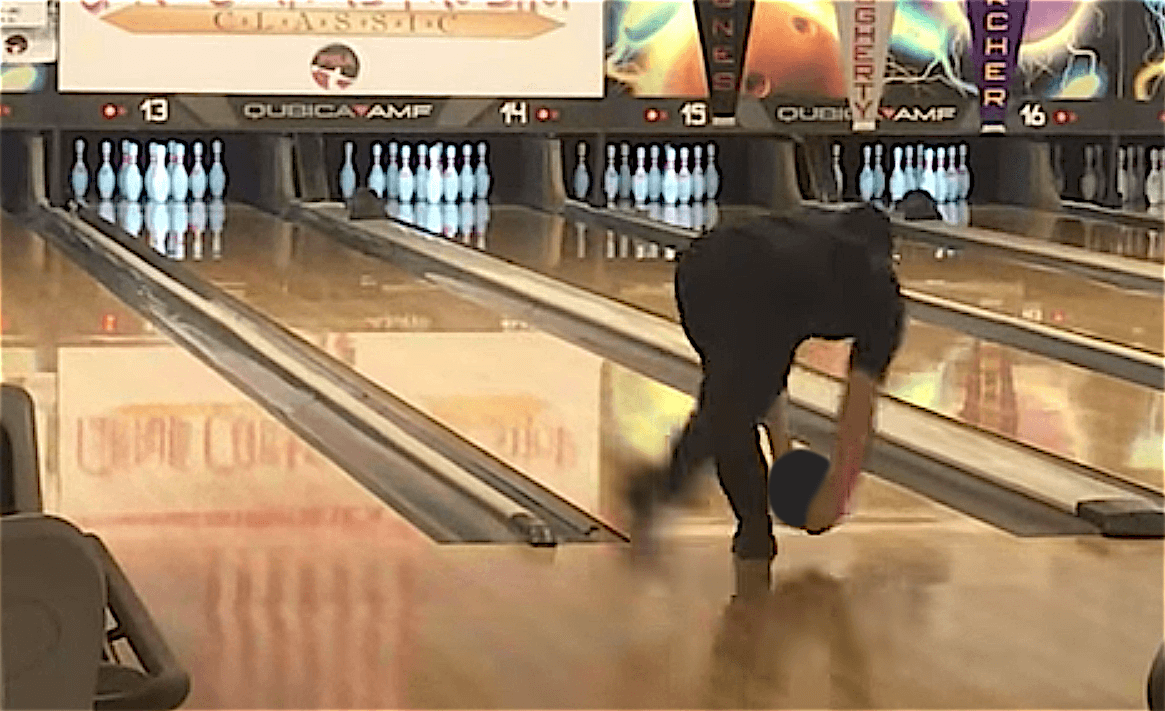
Photo: Two hands retain contact with the ball until just before the release, the release itself involving only one hand.

Video: Two-handed approach, viewed from another angle (Kyle Troup, 2022)

A two-handed approach is a bowling technique whereupon the throwing hand is in the bowling ball and the opposite hand is also placed on the ball during the shot. This is an evolution of the one-handed no-thumb technique, where a bowler would generate similar revolutions but could not be as effective because their opposite hand does not support the ball through the approach.

A two-handed approach can be combined with the seldom-used backup ball release. Shown here: a left-handed backup ball release (Eric Jones, 2023) causes a hook in the same direction as would be made by a conventional right-handed release.

Traditionally, in two handed bowling, two fingers are inserted into the ball with the thumb left out. The dominant hand is then used to cradle the ball and creates extra spin on the release. Then, the opposite hand is used to guide the ball through the throwing motion, with the ball delivered shovel-style. Two handed bowlers are forced to flex forward farther and rotate their hips more than a single handed bowler. These bowlers are placing more torque through the spine in order to increase the ball speed and revolution rate. This form of bowling, if done correctly, increases force, revolutions and pin carry. A two handed bowler's revolution rate can reach up to 600 revolutions per minute, which is up to 17% more rotation than the nearest elite single handed bowler and twice what some top professional bowlers generate.

The two-handed approach should not be confused with the two-handed delivery. Just prior to the release of the ball, a bowler using a two-handed approach removes their supporting hand, effectively delivering the ball with only one hand. They are considered a one-handed bowler by governing bodies, and must follow appropriate rules regarding switching dominant hands during competition. An actual two-handed delivery involves using both hands simultaneously to give force to the ball and is extremely rare in adult competition; it is mostly seen with young children first learning the game.'

Australian Jason Belmonte, the all-time leader in PBA major championships, was among the first bowlers to gain worldwide recognition for using the two-handed approach style. Others that followed include Finn Osku Palermaa, Swede Jesper Svensson, and Americans Kyle Troup and Anthony Simonsen. American Chaz Dennis, who as a 10-year-old became the second-youngest person ever to bowl a 300 game, also uses this technique. The bowling team of Bolivia is also noted for changing its bowlers to using the two-handed approach style.

While used by just a handful of veteran professional players, this style is becoming popular with young bowlers. A Bowlers Journal International article in 2018 states that 21% of the junior bowlers at the recently completed USBC Junior Gold Championships used the two-handed approach style. This includes 25% of bowlers in the U12 category (ages 12 and under), 24% of U15 bowlers, and 19% of U20 bowlers.

=== Full roller ===
Full roller is a style of bowling that traces its origins to the earliest days of bowling. Many top champions of the past were full rollers such as Ned Day and Billy Hardwick. There are also some modern full rollers such as Dave Ewald and Tom Smallwood. A full roller rolls the ball in such a way that the ball tracks over its full circumference, thus the name full roller. In addition to a full circumference ball track, the ball track itself crosses between the fingers and thumb through the palm in a diagonal path. A full roller release can be very straight such as Billy Hardwick rolled, or have up to a 90 degree or greater axis of rotation such as Tom Smallwood rolls. Usually a suitcase style grip with the thumb in the 9 o'clock position and the fingers in the 3 o'clock position (for a right hander) at the moment of release will create a full roller track. As the hand comes forward the thumb exits first, and the fingers still at 3 o'clock, lift up through the ball, causing it to rotate off the fingers to the left, creating side rotation and a horizontal track through the palm center of the ball.

== See also ==
- Bowling ball § Effect of delivery characteristics on ball motion
- Glossary of bowling
