= Amleto Monacelli =

Venezuelan ten-pin bowler (born 1961)

Personal information
- Born: 27 August 1961 (age 65) Barquisimeto, Venezuela
- Years active: 1982-present
- Height: 1.75 m (5 ft 9 in)
- Website: https://www.amletomonacelli.com/

Bowling Information
- Affiliation: PBA
- Rookie year: 1987
- Dominant hand: Right
- Wins: 20 PBA Tour (1 major); 10 PBA50 Tour (5 majors); 2 PBA60 Tour
- 300-games: 58
- Sponsors: Brunswick
Medal record
Representing Venezuela
Pan American Games
Silver medal – second place	2011 Guadalajara	Men's pairs
Silver medal – second place	2015 Toronto	Men's singles

Amleto Monacelli (born 27 August 1961) is a Venezuelan professional bowler and a member of the Professional Bowlers Association (PBA). He has amassed 20 titles on the PBA Tour, making him one of only 17 players in history to accumulate at least 20 victories. He was the first international player to earn PBA Player of the Year honors, and the first to be inducted into the PBA Hall of Fame. He is also a member of the USBC Hall of Fame. In addition to his PBA Tour titles, he has won ten titles on the PBA50 Tour, including five majors.

Monacelli is a member of the Brunswick pro staff.

== Professional career ==
=== PBA Tour ===
Monacelli joined the PBA in 1982, and he won his first PBA Tour event in the 1987 Japan Cup. Amleto's style typified that of the modernizing game of bowling, as he was one of the first bowlers to successfully use the powerful cranker-style release. In the 1989 season he won four titles, including the Touring Players Championship (his only major on the standard PBA Tour), on his way to winning the Harry Smith Points Leader and PBA Player of the Year awards. This marked the first time an international player had won PBA Player of the Year honors (Mika Koivuniemi of Finland and Jason Belmonte of Australia have since also earned this distinction). Monacelli repeated as Player of the Year in 1990, a year in which he also won the George Young High Average award.

Monacelli failed to qualify for a PBA exemption in the 2007–08 and 2008–09 seasons, but regained his exemption for 2009–10. He appeared in the TV finals at the 2009-10 PBA Chameleon Championship. A forearm injury sustained during match play led to a disappointing 142 score and a loss in his opening match.

Monacelli won his 20th PBA title in January 2016, at the site of his first, in Japan's Tokyo Port Bowl for the DHC PBA Japan Invitational. Qualifying as the #2 seed, Monacelli defeated Chris Barnes in the semifinal, then went on to defeat England's Dominic Barrett in the final. Ending an 11-year title drought on the standard PBA Tour, the 54-year old Monacelli became the third-oldest player to win a PBA Tour title, behind John Handegard (age 57) and Buzz Fazio (winner of two titles at age 56). With Norm Duke winning a 2019 standard PBA Tour title a month shy of his 55th birthday, Monacelli is now fourth on this list.

Monacelli's 20 total titles place him tied for 14th on the all-time list with Dick Ritger, Tommy Jones, and Wayne Webb. He has won over $2.7 million (U.S.) on the PBA Tour (through 2022), making him one of only ten PBA bowlers in history to surpass $2 million in career earnings. He was ranked #21 on the PBA's 2008 list of "50 Greatest Players of the Last 50 Years," and has rolled 58 perfect 300 games in PBA Tour events.

The PBA recognized Monacelli in 1997 by inducting him into the PBA Hall of Fame, making him the first international player so honored. In a 1999 edition of El Nacional, a Venezuelan newspaper, Monacelli was ranked as the fourth best Venezuelan athlete of the 20th Century. He was inducted into the USBC Hall of Fame in 2012.

Monacelli was the manager of the Las Vegas High Rollers PBA Elite League team, which won the Elias Cup championship in 2024.

=== PBA50 Tour ===
While continuing to bowl in selected events on the PBA Tour, Monacelli also joined the PBA Senior Tour (now PBA50 Tour) in 2012 and became the first international player to win the Senior U.S. Open by defeating all-time PBA titles leader Walter Ray Williams, Jr. in the final match. Monacelli was selected as the 2012 PBA Senior Rookie of the Year, becoming the first international player to earn the award. He went on to win eight more PBA50 Tour titles through the 2019 season, including a repeat win in the 2013 Senior U.S. Open and another major win at the 2015 USBC Senior Masters. Monacelli won his fourth PBA50 major title at the PBA50 National Championship on August 17, 2016. On June 9, 2019, Monacelli won the USBC Senior Masters for a second time, earning his fifth PBA50 Tour major overall.

On July 5, 2021, Monacelli won his tenth PBA50 Tour title at the PBA50 Odessa Open. With this victory, Monacelli joined Tom Baker, Walter Ray Williams Jr. and Pete Weber as the only players in history to amass at least ten titles on both the PBA and PBA50 Tours. (Parker Bohn III also joined this group in 2022.) He is also one of eight players in history to win a PBA Tour or PBA50 Tour title in five different decades, joining Dick Weber, Dave Soutar, Johnny Petraglia, Walter Ray Williams Jr., Pete Weber, Parker Bohn III and Norm Duke.

On September 13, 2021, Monacelli won the USBC Super Senior Classic, an event for players aged 60 and older.

== Monacelli's PBA Tour Titles ==
=== PBA Tour Titles ===
Major titles are shown in bold type.

1. 1987 Japan Cup (Tokyo, Japan)
2. 1988 Showboat Invitational (Las Vegas, Nevada)
3. 1989 Miller Lite Challenge (Tucson, Arizona)
4. 1989 Wichita Open (Wichita, Kansas)
5. **1989 Budweiser Touring Players Championship** (Taylor, Michigan)
6. 1989 Cambridge Credit Mixed Doubles w/Tish Johnson (Reno, Nevada)
7. 1990 Columbus Professional Bowling Classic (Columbus, Ohio)
8. 1990 Wichita Open (Wichita, Kansas)
9. 1990 Cambridge Credit Mixed Doubles w/Tish Johnson (Reno, Nevada)
10. 1991 Quaker State Open (Grand Prairie, Texas)
11. 1991 True Value Open (Peoria, Illinois)
12. 1992 Choice Hotels Summer Classic (Edmond, Oklahoma)
13. 1992 Taylor Lanes Open (Taylor, Michigan)
14. 1994 Leisure's Long Island Open (Sayville, New York)
15. 1994 Greater Lexington Classic (Lexington, Kentucky)
16. 1995 Oronamin C Japan Cup (Tokyo, Japan)
17. 1997 Mobil 1 Classic (Bay City, Michigan)
18. 1997 Ebonite Classic (Chesapeake, Virginia)
19. 2005 Jackson-Hewitt Tax Service Open (Fairlawn, Ohio)
20. 2016 DHC PBA Japan Invitational (Tokyo, Japan)

=== PBA50 Tour Titles ===
1. 2012 **Senior U.S. Open**, Las Vegas, NV.
2. 2013 **Senior U.S. Open**, Las Vegas, NV.
3. 2014 PBA50 Pasco County Open, New Port Richey, Fla.
4. 2015 PBA50 Northern California Classic, Brentwood, Calif.
5. 2015 **USBC Senior Masters**, Green Bay, Wis.
6. 2016 PBA50 Fountain Valley Open, Fountain Valley, Calif.
7. 2016 **PBA50 National Championship**, Elkhart, Ind.
8. 2017 PBA50 Northern California Classic, Brentwood, Calif.
9. 2019 **USBC Senior Masters**, Las Vegas, NV.
10. 2021 PBA50 Odessa Open, Odessa, TX.

=== PBA60 Tour Titles ===
1. 2021 **USBC Super Senior Classic**, Las Vegas, Nevada
2. 2022 PBA60 Tristan's T.A.P.S. Memorial, Columbus, Ohio

== Personal ==
The son of Italian and Hispanic parents, Monacelli speaks fluent Italian, Spanish, and English. He was an accomplished soccer player in his teen years, but increased his participation in bowling when his parents took ownership of a bowling center in Venezuela. By age 17, he decided to pursue bowling full-time and make it his career.

== Sources ==
- Amleto Moncelli Bio at PBA.com (archived March 31, 2016)
