= Tom Baker (bowler) =

American ten-pin bowler (born 1954)

Personal information
- Born: September 12, 1954 (age 71)
- Height: 5 ft 8 in (173 cm)

Bowling Information
- Affiliation: PBA
- Rookie year: 1976
- Dominant hand: Right
- Wins: 10 PBA Tour (1 major); 12 PBA50 Tour (4 majors); 1 PBA60 Tour; 16 PBA Regional Tour; 22 PBA50 Regional Tour
- 300-games: 65
- Sponsors: Roto Grip

Tom Baker (born September 12, 1954, Buffalo, New York) is a professional bowler in the Professional Bowlers Association and a member of the PBA and USBC Halls of Fame. He has won 10 titles on the regular PBA Tour (including one major), and 12 more on the PBA50 Tour (formerly PBA Senior Tour). He currently resides in King, North Carolina.

== PBA career ==
After winning his first title in 1980, Baker had an outstanding 1981 season, winning three titles and over $103,000 that year. By 1986, he had won 7 PBA titles before going on a 10-year winless streak, partially due to recurring wrist injuries. In 1996, he returned to the winner's circle at the AC-Delco Classic, and won again in 1997 in Harrisburg, Pennsylvania. After another 7-year drought, he shocked the bowling world by winning the 2004 PBA World Championship at age 49. At the time, Baker was the oldest player to win a PBA major, though that mark has since been surpassed by Walter Ray Williams Jr. and Pete Weber, both of whom won majors at age 50. The event's final round was held at the EMU Convocation Center in Ypsilanti, Michigan, and paid a first prize of $120,000 – more than Baker had ever won in an entire season previously. The win also earned Baker a five-year PBA Tour exemption, lasting through the 2008-09 season.

Baker was a standout on the PBA50 Tour after joining in 2005, winning four PBA50 major titles and eight PBA50 standard tournaments, while continuing to compete on the regular tour through 2009. His 12 total PBA50 titles rank tied for fourth all-time, behind Walter Ray Williams Jr. (16), John Handegard (14) and Pete Weber (14). He is one of only five bowlers in history (with Walter Ray Williams Jr., Pete Weber, Amleto Monacelli and Parker Bohn III) to have won at least 10 titles on both the standard PBA Tour and the PBA50 Tour. Baker was named Senior Rookie of the Year and Senior Player of the Year in 2005, becoming the first player to earn both honors in a single season. Since then, Norm Duke and Tom Hess have matched Baker's feat. He won Senior Player of the Year honors again in 2006 and 2007, an unprecedented streak in the history of the PBA Senior Tour.

Baker also owns 16 PBA Regional Tour titles and 22 PBA50 Regional titles.

Baker was ranked #40 (tied with Joe Berardi) on the PBA's 2008 list of "50 Greatest Players of the Last 50 Years."

=== PBA Tour titles ===
Major championships in bold type.

1. 1980 Northern California Open (Fremont, California)
2. 1981 Pennzoil Open (Torrance, California)
3. 1981 Showboat Doubles Classic w/Joe Hutchinson (Las Vegas, Nevada)
4. 1981 Denver Open (Denver, Colorado)
5. 1982 AMF Grand Prix (Paris, France)
6. 1985 Budweiser Classic (Columbus, Ohio)
7. 1986 Kodak Invitational (Rochester, New York)
8. 1996 AC-Delco Classic (Lakewood, California)
9. 1997 Harrisburg Open (Harrisburg, Pennsylvania)
10. **2004 PBA World Championship** (Taylor, Michigan)

=== Senior PBA titles ===
Major championships in bold type.

1. **2005 PBA Senior U.S. Open** (Sterling Heights, Michigan)
2. 2006 Senior Chillicothe Open (Chillicothe, Ohio)
3. 2006 PBA Senior Tucson Open (Tucson, Arizona)
4. **2006 PBA Senior U.S. Open** (Las Vegas, Nevada)
5. **2006 USBC Senior Masters** (Reno, Nevada)
6. 2007 PBA Senior Northern California Classic (Brentwood, California)
7. **2007 USBC Senior Masters** (Reno, Nevada)
8. 2007 PBA Senior Dick Weber Invitational (Ballwin, Missouri)
9. 2010 PBA Senior Pepsi Open (Decatur, Illinois)
10. 2013 PBA50 Greater Birmingham Open (Birmingham, Alabama)
11. 2014 PBA50 Greater Northern California Open (Brentwood, California)
12. 2014 PBA50 Dayton Classic (Dayton, Ohio)
13. 2017 PBA60 Killer B Open (New Port Richey, Florida)

== Honors ==
- Inducted into the PBA Hall of Fame in 1999 and the USBC Hall of Fame in 2012.
- Voted into the Greater Buffalo Sports Hall of Fame in 1999.
- Won the Steve Nagy Sportsmanship Award in the 1980 and 1981 seasons.
- PBA Senior Player of the Year for three consecutive seasons (2005 through 2007)
- Has earned over $1.9 million as a PBA professional (over $1.45 million on the regular PBA tour)
- Has rolled 65 career perfect 300 games in PBA competition. Was part of a 300-300 match play tie with Pete Weber in 1981.
- Holds the record for most events bowled on the PBA Tour in a career with 840.
