= Walter Ray Williams Jr. =

American professional ten-pin bowler (born 1959)

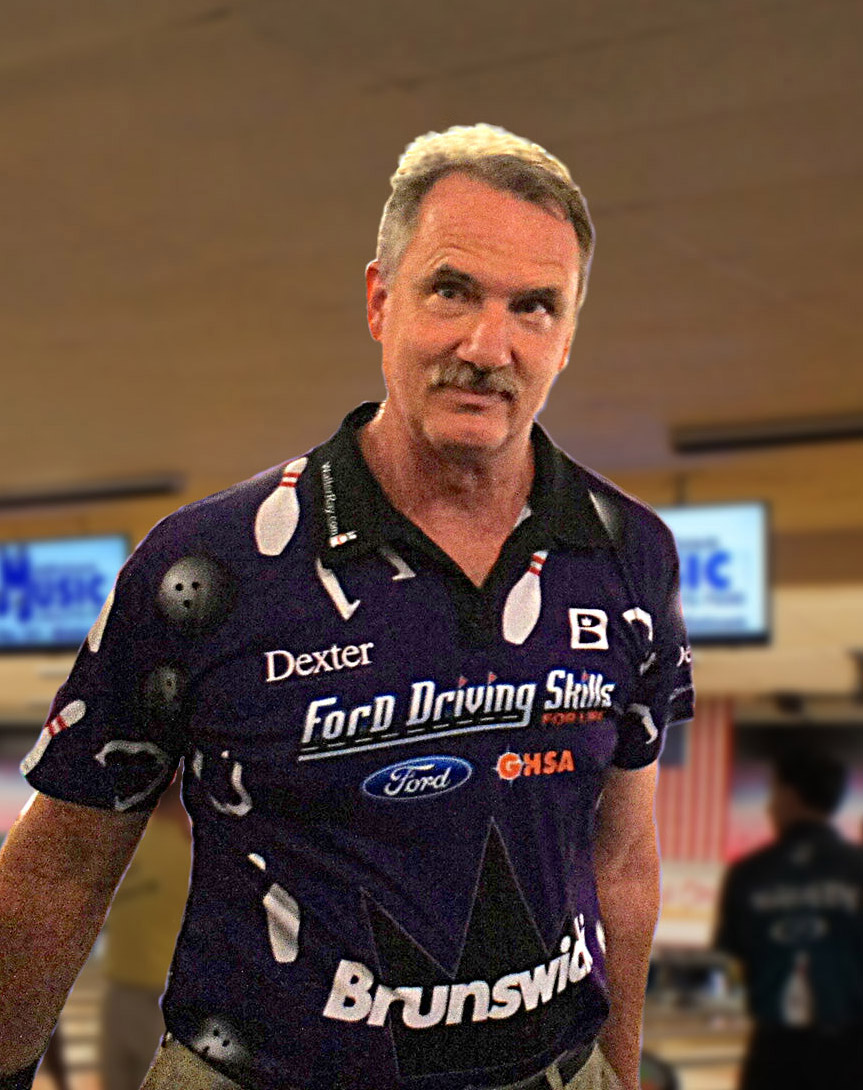
- Williams in 2016

Personal information
- Nickname: Deadeye
- Born: October 6, 1959 (age 67) San Jose, California, U.S.
- Years active: 1970–present
- Height: 6 ft 2 in (188 cm)

Sport
- Country: United States
- Sport: Ten-pin bowling, Horseshoes
- League: PBA, NHPA World Tournament, PBA50 Tour
- Turned pro: 1970 (horseshoes); 1980 (bowling)

Achievements and titles
- National finals: 47 PBA Tour titles (8 majors); 16 PBA50 Tour titles (3 majors); 1 PBA60 Tour title 7× PBA Player of the Year (1986, 1993, 1996, 1997, 1998, 2003, 2010); 3× PBA50 Player of the Year (2012, 2013, 2019); 9 World Horseshoes titles

Walter Ray Williams Jr. (born October 6, 1959) is an American professional tenpin bowler and competitive horseshoes pitcher. He has won 47 national PBA Tour career titles, the most in the tour’s history, and has earned over $5 million in total PBA earnings as of 2022. Among his 47 titles are eight major championships. Williams is a seven-time PBA Player of the Year, tied with Jason Belmonte for the most all-time in history, and is one of five bowlers (with Earl Anthony, Mark Roth, Belmonte and E. J. Tackett) to win the award in three consecutive seasons (1996–1998). Williams has the distinction of being the only bowler to win the PBA Player of the Year award in 4 different decades, and is also the oldest player (50 in 2010) to win the award. He won at least one PBA Tour title in a record 17 consecutive seasons (1993 through 2009–10).

He was one of four featured bowlers in the ten-pin bowling documentary A League of Ordinary Gentlemen.

As of June 26, 2022, he is also the all-time leader in PBA50 Tour titles, with 16. Additionally, he is a three-time PBA50 Player of the Year and has won three major championships on that tour. He had rolled 110 career perfect 300 games in PBA competition through 2019.

On December 18, 2016, Williams became the first player in history to reach 100 total PBA titles (combined PBA Tour, PBA Regional Tour, PBA50 Tour, PBA50 Regional Tour). Only one player, Pete Weber, has matched this accomplishment. Williams' total is now 131 (with PBA60 Tour wins added). Williams retired from the regular PBA Tour in 2021 but continues to bowl in PBA50 Tour, PBA60 Tour and PBA Regional Tour events. He owns the most combined Regional titles all-time with 67 (35 on the PBA Regional Tour and 32 on the PBA50 Regional Tour).

Williams has had multiple sponsors over the years. He is currently sponsored by Brunswick, VISE grips and Dexter shoes.

Williams is also a nine-time world champion in the game of horseshoes (three junior titles and six men's titles).

== Bowling career ==
=== PBA Tour ===
Williams is a seven-time PBA Player of the Year (1986, '93, '96, '97, '98, 2003, 2010), having surpassed Earl Anthony in 2010 for the most Player of the Year awards in PBA history. Jason Belmonte tied Williams with his seventh PBA Player of the Year award in 2022. Williams has won a record eight Bowling Writers Bowler of the Year awards and is also the all-time leading money winner on the PBA Tour. He holds the most PBA money titles.

He was the first bowler in history to surpass $2 million in career earnings in 1997. With his win in the 2003 U.S. Open, he also became the first $3 million career winner and the first $4 million career winner in 2008. Williams also set a record for the highest monetary winnings in a single season, with $419,701 during the 2002–03 PBA season. This record would be broken in the 2021 season by Kyle Troup.

On September 24, 2006, Williams eclipsed Earl Anthony's career record of 41 PBA regular tour titles with his 42nd win at the Dydo Japan Cup over Pete Weber in a 289–236 single game pinfall. Anthony's title count was amended to 43 in 2008 when the PBA chose to include ABC Masters titles earned by a PBA member as PBA Tour titles. By that time, Williams had accumulated 44 titles to maintain a lead over Anthony. Williams has been known as "Deadeye" in PBA fan circles, but first got the nickname in horseshoes, when he threw 45 ringers out of a possible 50 in a junior tournament at the age of 10 years old.

In the 2007–08 season, at age 48, Williams established the second-highest average in PBA history for a single season — 228.34. Only Norm Duke's 2006–07 mark of 228.47 was higher at the time, though that has since been broken by Jason Belmonte's 228.81 in the 2012–13 season (which was surpassed by Belmonte himself in 2017 with a 229.49 average). Through the 2019 PBA50 season, he has bowled 110 career 300 games in PBA competition, second only to the 114 perfect games tallied by Parker Bohn III.

Upon winning the 2009 Motor City Open championship, Williams extended his record of winning at least one PBA Tour title per season to 17 consecutive seasons, two years more than Earl Anthony's 1970–84 run. Williams' streak ended when he failed to win a title in the 2010–11 season.

==== FIQ WTBA World Championships ====
In August 2008, Williams joined Team USA to participate in that year's FIQ World Men's Championships in Thailand. For the first time, professionals were allowed to compete in this international event with over 330 participants from 56 countries. Williams was the most successful bowler in the championships, winning four medals: Gold in Masters, Gold in Singles, Gold in Team and a Bronze medal in Trios.

==== PBA Tour retirement ====
On March 17, 2021, Williams announced his retirement from the national PBA Tour after being eliminated from the Round of 8 in the final event of World Series of Bowling XII. He stated he would continue to bowl in PBA50 Tour and PBA Regional Tour events.

=== PBA50 Tour ===
Williams bowling in June 2024

After turning 50, Williams announced that he would participate in the 2010 PBA Senior Tour (renamed the PBA50 Tour in 2013), but in limited events due to Team USA and other obligations.

Williams made his PBA Senior Tour debut on May 3, 2010, at the Miller High Life Classic in Mooresville, NC. He won the tournament three days later. On June 18, 2010, Williams had a chance to become just the second bowler to win the USBC Masters and USBC Senior Masters in a career (joining Dave Soutar), and the first to win both in the same year. Williams made the three-game final, but he was denied the title when he fell, 705-628, to fellow PBA Hall of Famer Wayne Webb. Williams did bowl enough on the Senior Tour to earn 2010 PBA Senior Rookie of the Year honour.

In the 2011 PBA Senior season, Williams again had a chance to match Soutar as the only bowler to win both the USBC Masters and Senior USBC Masters. He came in second, falling to Dale Traber in the finals, 707–695.

Williams won two Senior titles in 2012 and earned his first Senior PBA Player of the Year award.

Williams won three PBA50 titles in 2013 and earned his second PBA50 Player of the Year award.

In 2014, Williams won the USBC Senior Masters, making him the second bowler, after Dave Soutar, to have won both the USBC Masters and USBC Senior Masters. (Tom Hess joined this exclusive group in 2021.) On June 11, 2017, Williams won his second USBC Senior Masters, becoming the only player in history to win the USBC Masters and USBC Senior Masters twice each.

At age 59, Williams opened the 2019 PBA50 season with three consecutive victories, including the PBA50 National Championship, giving him three majors among his 14 PBA50 Tour titles. The wins tied him with John Handegard for the most PBA50 Tour titles of all-time. With a third place finish in the second-to-last event of the 2019 PBA50 Tour season, Williams clinched his third career PBA50 Player of the Year award.

After the 2020 PBA50 season was cancelled due to the COVID-19 pandemic, Williams won the opening event of the 2021 PBA50 Tour season on April 13. The 708–655 victory over Michael Haugen Jr. in the three-game final at the PBA50 Lightning Strikes Open gave Williams the most PBA50 Tour titles of all time, with 15. Williams extended the record to 16 by winning the 2022 PBA50 Odessa Open on June 26.

== Achievements ==
Williams is known for several PBA achievements:

- Record highest season spare percentage (88.16%, 655/743; 2004–05) and single-pin conversion percentage (100%, 475/475; 2005–06).
- Second-best strike (68.21) percentage and match play average (235.23).
- Record number of career television appearances (182 through 2012), most television appearances in a season (15 in 1993), most consecutive television appearances 5 (2x; 2000, 2001), and most consecutive seasons making at least one television appearance (26).
- Most consecutive seasons winning at least one PBA Tour title (17, reached in the 2009–10 season).
- Most final match appearances (92, through the 2009-10 season).
- Most games bowled in one season (1300 in 1993).
- Second-highest pinfall in a nine-game series (2,367 in Tucson, AZ, 2004; broken by Eugene McCune's 2,468 pins in 2010).
- Tied for most 300 games in one tournament (4; Mechanicsburg, PA, 1993).
- Eight-time winner of the George Young High Average Award and Harry Smith Points Leader Award (most all-time for each award).
- Seven-time PBA Player of the year, which is tied with Jason Belmonte for the most all-time. Oldest bowler (50) to be named PBA Player of the Year (2010), and the only player to win the award in four different decades.
- First player to reach 100 total PBA titles (47 PBA Tour, 32 PBA Regional Tour, 10 PBA50 Tour, 11 PBA50 Regional Tour), accomplished in 2016.
- Only player in history to win the USBC Masters and USBC Senior Masters twice each.
- The only PBA player to convert the 4-6-7-10 split (also known as the "Big Four" or the "Double Pinochle") on television.
- Bowled a two-handed 300 game at the 2019 River City Extreme Open.

== Later career and standing in the sport ==
17 (out of 47) of Williams's titles and 6 of his 8 majors were earned after he reached age 40. Williams' most recent PBA Tour title at the 2010 USBC Masters came after he reached age 50. Williams swept every major PBA statistical category in the 2009–10 season, leading the tour in earnings ($152,670), average (222.89), match play appearances (15), and overall competition points.

On his longevity and future plans, Williams said in 2009:

As long as I feel good and stay competitive, I’ll keep on bowling. I don't want to be out here if I'm not competitive; I'd be too frustrated. When I can't compete, when it isn't fun, I'll retire. I have no issue with that. But I feel like I'm still doing pretty well.

Williams was named "Male Bowler of the Decade" (2000–2009) in the Winter, 2010 issue of U.S. Bowler. He won his then-unprecedented seventh PBA Player of the Year award in 2010, becoming the oldest player in history (50) to earn that honour.

He is a member of the USBC and PBA Halls of Fame, a member of the World Horseshoe Pitching Hall of Fame, and was a two-time past president of the Professional Bowlers Association.

In the 2008–09 season, the PBA's 50th, the PBA commissioned a panel of bowling experts to recognize the "50 Greatest Players of the Last 50 Years." Williams finished second on the list, behind only Earl Anthony. On an ESPN telecast on January 25, 2009, Nelson Burton Jr. noted that the voting was close, but Anthony reached the #1 spot primarily for having more major titles than Williams (ten to seven at the time). Williams states that:

I feel Earl's record is better than mine because it was more condensed. Earl bowled 14 years and 400 or so events. I've bowled well over 600 by now, maybe 700. I feel very pleased to be No. 2."

On December 10, 2016, Williams made it to the final match of the PBA Shark Championship in Reno, NV. A victory would have made Williams the oldest player (57 years, 65 days) to ever win a regular PBA Tour event, but he was defeated in the finals by Canadian François Lavoie. John Handegard continues to hold the distinction as the oldest PBA Tour champion at 57 years, 55 days.

In his later career, Williams has experimented with a two-handed "shovel style" delivery, and began using it in some PBA50 tournaments. At the River City Extreme Open in July 2019, he shot a 300 game in qualifying using the two-handed approach.

Through 2019, Williams had bowled in over 1,000 PBA tournaments. From 2016 to 2019, Williams bowled in at least 34 PBA events every year (more than 40 events from 2017 to 2019), and cashed over $110,000 in three of the four years.

Despite turning 40 at the turn of the century, Williams ranked #5 on the PBA's 2025 "Best 25 PBA Players of the Last 25 Seasons" list. The ranking was based on a points system that took into account standard titles, major titles, top-five finishes and Player of the Year awards.

== Horseshoes ==
Williams has also won six Men's World Horseshoe Pitching titles. He was invited to pitch horseshoes at the White House with President George H.W. Bush in 1989. After switching his throwing hand from right to left, he finished second in the 2005 World Horseshoe Pitching Championships.

== Personal life ==
Williams graduated from Cal Poly Pomona in 1984 with a Bachelor of Science degree in physics and a minor in mathematics. He has stated that if he wasn't a successful bowler, "I would have gone to work for NASA."

Williams and his first wife (Paige Pennington) lived in Oxford, FL, and adopted a daughter (Rebecca) in 2007 but later divorced in 2017. He now lives in Oxford with his second wife, Fancy Allen.

In addition to his bowling and horseshoes championship accomplishments, Williams plays golf and at one time had a two handicap.

== Williams' career PBA Tour titles ==
Among Williams' 47 career PBA Tour titles are eight majors (in bold text below). He is a three-time winner of the PBA World Championship and has also won two U.S. Open crowns, two ABC/USBC Masters titles, and a Touring Players Championship. He was a Tournament of Champions title short of completing a career "super grand slam."

He has also won 16 PBA50 Tour titles (3 majors), making him the all-time PBA50 titles leader and one of only five bowlers (along with Pete Weber, Tom Baker, Amleto Monacelli and Parker Bohn III) to win at least 10 titles on both PBA national tours. Williams is also the only player in history to earn at least 60 combined titles between the PBA and PBA50 Tours.

=== PBA Tour titles ===
Major championships are in bold text.

1. 1986 True Value Open, Peoria, Ill.
2. 1986 Fair Lanes Open, Baltimore, Md.
3. 1986 Hammer Open, Edmond, Okla.
4. 1987 Miller Lite Classic, Miami, Fla.
5. 1987 Hammer Open, Edmond, Okla.
6. 1991 Oronamin C Japan Cup, Tokyo, Japan
7. 1993 Flagship City Open, Erie, Pa.
8. 1993 Columbia 300 Open, San Antonio, Texas
9. 1993 Northwest Classic, Kennewick, Wash.
10. 1993 Oregon Open, Portland, Ore.
11. 1993 Tucson Open, Tucson, Ariz.
12. 1993 Greater Grand Rapids Open, Grand Rapids, Mich.
13. 1993 Paula Carter's Homestead Classic, Homestead, Fla.
14. 1994 Showboat Invitational, Las Vegas, Nev.
15. **1994 Touring Players Championship**, Indianapolis, Ind.
16. 1995 Rochester Open, Rochester, N.Y.
17. 1996 Track Synergy Open, Kennewick, Wash.
18. 1996 Showboat Invitational, Las Vegas, Nev.
19. 1996 Brunswick Johnny Petraglia Open, North Brunswick, N.J.
20. 1996 Rochester Open, Rochester, N.Y.
21. 1996 Greater Harrisburg Open, Mechanicsburg, Pa.
22. 1997 Columbia 300 Open, Austin, Texas
23. 1997 Brunswick Johnny Petraglia Open, North Brunswick, N.J.
24. 1997 St. Clair Classic, Fairview Heights, Ill.
25. 1998 Storm Flagship Open, Erie, Pa.
26. **1998 BPAA U.S. Open**, Milford, Conn.
27. 1998 Brunswick Long Island Open, Coram, N.Y.
28. 1998 Bay City Classic, Bay City, Mich.
29. 1998 National Finance Challenge, Indianapolis, Ind.
30. 1999 Tucson Open, Tucson, Ariz.
31. 2000 Track Canandaigua Open, Canandaigua, N.Y.
32. 2000 Brunswick Johnny Petraglia Open, North Brunswick, N.J.
33. **2001–02 PBA National Championship**, Toledo, Ohio
34. 2001–02 Greater Cincinnati Classic, Erlanger, Ky.
35. 2002–03 Greater Detroit Open, Taylor, Mich.
36. **2002–03 U.S. Open**, Fountain Valley, Calif.
37. **2002–03 PBA World Championship**, Taylor, Mich.
38. 2003–04 Earl Anthony Classic Presented by Storm, Tacoma, Wash.
39. **2003–04 ABC Masters**, Reno, Nev.
40. 2004–05 Uniroyal Tire Classic, Wickliffe, Ohio
41. **2005–06 Denny's PBA World Championship**, Indianapolis, Ind.
42. 2006–07 Dydo Japan Cup, Tokyo, Japan
43. 2007–08 Motor City Classic, Taylor, Mich.
44. 2007–08 Great Lakes Classic, Wyoming, Mich.
45. 2008–09 Lake County Indiana Golden Anniversary Championship, Hammond, Ind.
46. 2009–10 Motor City Open, Allen Park, Mich.
47. **2009–10 USBC Masters**, Reno, Nev.

=== PBA50 Tour titles ===
1. 2010 PBA Senior Miller High Life Classic, Mooresville, NC.
2. 2011 PBA Senior Mark Roth Allentown Open, Allentown, PA.
3. 2012 PBA Senior Don Carter Memorial, Winter Garden, FL.
4. 2012 PBA Senior Northern California Classic, Brentwood, CA.
5. 2013 PBA50 Sun Bowl in The Villages, The Villages, FL.
6. 2013 PBA50 Northern California Classic, Brentwood, CA.
7. 2013 PBA50 South Shore Open, Hammond, IN.
8. **2014 USBC Senior Masters**, Las Vegas, NV.
9. 2014 PBA50 Treasure Island Resort & Casino Open, Welch, MN.
10. 2016 PBA50 Pasco County Florida Open, New Port Richey, FL.
11. **2017 USBC Senior Masters**, Las Vegas, NV.
12. 2019 PBA50 Johnny Petraglia BVL Open, Clearwater, FL.
13. **2019 PBA50 National Championship**, The Villages, FL.
14. 2019 PBA50 Mooresville Open, Mooresville, NC.
15. 2021 PBA50 Lightning Strikes Open, Fort Myers, FL.
16. 2022 PBA50 Odessa Open, Odessa, Texas.

=== PBA60 Tour titles ===
1. 2023 PBA60 Tristan's T.A.P.S. Memorial, Columbus, OH.
