= Mika Koivuniemi =

Finnish ten-pin bowler (born 1967)

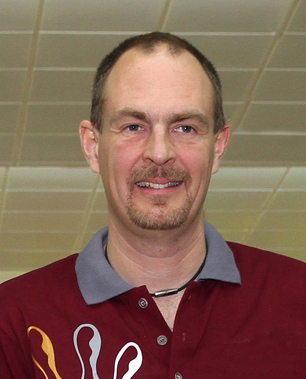

Personal information
- Born: Mika Juhani Koivuniemi; 6 April 1967 (age 59) Tampere, Finland
- Years active: 1988-present (joined PBA in 1999)
- Height: 1.93 m (6 ft 4 in)

Bowling Information
- Affiliation: PBA, World Bowling
- Rookie year: 2001
- Dominant hand: Right
- Wins: 21+ international wins, including: 14 PBA Tour (3 majors); 3 PBA50 Tour (2 majors); 2x PBA Player of the Year
- 300-games: 29
- Sponsors: Brunswick, Turbo Grips, Coolwick sportswear

Mika Juhani Koivuniemi (born 6 April 1967) is a Finnish professional ten-pin bowler and bowling coach. He competes as a member of the Professional Bowlers Association (PBA) in the United States, where he earned 14 PBA Tour titles (3 majors). Overall, he won bowling titles in 21 different countries during his career. He is a two-time PBA Player of the Year (2003–04 and 2010–11 seasons), one of only three players born outside the USA (with Amleto Monacelli and Jason Belmonte) to win that award. Koivuniemi is the second international player (after Monacelli) and first European ever elected to the PBA Hall of Fame; he was inducted in 2019. He is also a member of the World Bowling Writers Hall of Fame and Finland Bowling Hall of Fame. He now competes on the PBA50 Tour, where he has won three titles, two of them majors.

Koivuniemi was the bowling coach for the United Arab Emirates national team from 2015 through 2023.

He is sponsored by Brunswick, Turbo Grips and Coolwick sportswear.

== Amateur and international accomplishments ==
Growing up, Koivuniemi was an exceptional athlete, starring in three sports in high school: basketball, hockey, and soccer. Koivuniemi eventually became interested in bowling and made Team Finland in 1988 at age 21. He was an exceptional bowler for Team Finland, winning the 1991 FIQ World Championship, the 1995 European Individual Cup Championship, and the 1996 World Team Cup Championship.

On April 15, 2011, Koivuniemi captured the championship in the 2011 World Bowling Tour (WBT) Finals in Las Vegas, Nevada. As the #1 seed for the three-person stepladder final, Koivuniemi earned the WBT title by defeating Sean Rash of the USA 237–224 in a single-game match.

Mika has won bowling titles in 21 different countries (Austria, Bahrain, Canada, China, Colombia, Denmark, England, France, Germany, Japan, Korea, Malaysia, Netherlands, Qatar, Singapore, Slovenia, Spain, Sweden, Thailand, USA, and his home country of Finland).

== PBA Tour ==
Koivuniemi won 14 PBA Tour titles, including three majors. He rolled 29 career 300 games in PBA events through 2016. He passed the $1 million mark (U.S.) in total PBA earnings during the 2007–08 season. An extremely versatile bowler, he was the first player to win a title on all five of the PBA's original "animal" oil patterns (Shark, Chameleon, Cheetah, Scorpion and Viper) – a feat matched only by Tommy Jones so far.

Koivuniemi joined the PBA at age 31 in 1999. He had some initial success, but he didn't gain much traction until the 2001–02 season when he entered 27 events, cashed in 20, made match play 15 times, made the TV finals three times, and won one title. Koivuniemi raised the bar in the 2003–04 season when he was awarded PBA Player of the Year honors, becoming just the second international player (after Venezuela's Amleto Monacelli) and first European so honored. During that season he entered 20 events, cashed in 16, made match play 13 times, made the TV finals seven times, won two titles, and earned the PBA's George Young High Average Award. It was during this season that Koivuniemi bowled the 17th-ever televised 300 game in PBA Tour history, in a match against Jason Couch.

Koivuniemi's nickname on tour was "Major Mika." This is because his first two PBA titles came in major championships: the 2000 ABC Masters and 2001–02 U.S. Open. With the latter victory, he became the first foreign-born player to win the U.S. Open. He has also been dubbed "The Big Finn" by ESPN commentator Randy Pedersen.

On January 22, 2011, Koivuniemi won the PBA Tournament of Champions to capture his third PBA major title and the first prize of $250,000, the richest first-place prize in PBA tour history. In the semifinal match of this tournament, Mika narrowly missed becoming the first player in PBA history to roll two televised 300 games in a PBA Tour event, when he left a ringing 10 pin on the final shot for a 299 score. In addition, Koivuniemi's opponent in that match, Tom Daugherty, scored 100, so the margin of victory (+199) was the largest in Tour history. Koivuniemi went on to roll ten more strikes in the final match to defeat top seed Tom Smallwood, 269–207, for the major championship. Only a PBA World Championship title has kept him from a career "Grand Slam"; he had a runner-up finish in this event in 2004, losing to Tom Baker.

Koivuniemi also finished as the runner-up at the 2011 U.S. Open, which was arguably the most painful moment in his bowling career. Needing a 17 pin fill to win the title, he left the 10 pin on the first shot. He had to convert and then get at least 8 pins on his fill shot. However, he shockingly failed to convert the spare and lost to Norm Duke by the score of 225–216. The missed spare shocked Duke as well, given that Koivuniemi is known as one of the best spare converters on tour. Nonetheless, Koivuniemi became the only PBA player to make the TV finals in all four majors during a single season. These 2010–11 accomplishments earned him his second PBA Player of the Year Award.

On December 2, 2012, Koivuniemi became the first European player to win the PBA-DHC Japan Cup. Less than two weeks later, he won the PBA-WBT Qatar Open for his 11th PBA title. His next two PBA Tour titles also came in international events: at the 2013 PBA-WBT Vienna Open and 2014 Brunswick Ballmaster Open in his native Finland. His 14th and most recent PBA Tour title was earned at the 2014 Viper Open, part of that year's World Series of Bowling in Las Vegas.

Mika is a two-time winner of the World Bowling Tour (WBT) Men's Finals. Participants in this non-title event are based on a rolling points list from WBT events over the previous two years. Koivuniemi won his most recent WBT Men's Final on November 2, 2014, defeating Sean Rash in the final match.

Although he had been on tour for only nine seasons at the time, Koivuniemi was still ranked #49 on the PBA's 2008 Golden Anniversary list of "50 greatest PBA players of the last 50 years." He has won over $1.89 million (USD) in his PBA career.

Koivuniemi ranked #9 on the PBA's 2025 "Best 25 PBA Players of the Last 25 Seasons" list. The ranking was based on a points system that took into account standard titles, major titles, top-five finishes and Player of the Year awards.

=== Retirement ===
Koivuniemi announced in July 2015 that he would be retiring from full-time competitive bowling. The opportunity to coach the bowling team of the United Arab Emirates and the need to rehab from back and knee injuries were the main factors in his decision. He later came out of retirement for selected PBA50 Tour events in 2018. In 2024, having resigned as coach of the UAE team, he returned to the US to participate on the PBA50 Tour part time.

=== Hall of Fame ===
Koivuniemi was elected to the PBA Hall of Fame on October 1, 2018. He was officially inducted at a ceremony in Arlington, Texas on January 5, 2019, and is the first European player to gain induction.

=== PBA50 Tour ===
Koivuniemi came out of retirement in 2018 to participate in the PBA Senior U.S. Open, a major championship on the PBA50 Tour (formerly PBA Senior Tour). He was the #2 qualifier after the first 24 games, moved up to the #1 seed after the match play round, and won the tournament on June 15 for his first PBA50 Tour title. He stated he will bowl in an occasional professional event when he is able to get time off from his coaching duties.

Koivuniemi was again the top qualifier at the 2019 PBA Senior U.S. Open, but this time he lost the title match to Norway's Tore Torgersen in an all-Scandinavia final.

After resigning from his UAE team coaching position, he returned to Michigan (residing in Traverse City) to participate on the 2024 PBA50 Tour full-time. Despite not winning a title, Koivuniemi had an excellent 2024 PBA50 season. He made the top ten in all ten events he entered, made the stepladder finals eight times, and had three runner-up finishes.

On July 15, 2025, Koivuniemi won his second PBA50 Tour title in the PBA50 Petraglia Championship held in Jackson, Michigan. On July 22, 2026, he won his third PBA50 Tour title and second PBA50 major at the Bud Moore PBA50 Players Championship.

== Koivuniemi's PBA titles ==
Major championships are in bold type.

=== PBA Tour ===
1. **2000 ABC Masters** (Albuquerque, New Mexico)
2. **2001 U.S. Open** (Fountain Valley, California)
3. 2003 PBA Cambridge Credit Classic (Windsor Locks, Connecticut), bowled televised 300
4. 2004 PBA Reno Open (Reno, Nevada)
5. 2005 PBA GEICO Open (Mesa, Arizona)
6. 2005 Baby Ruth Real Deal Classic (Indianapolis, Indiana)
7. 2007 Sun City Classic (El Paso, Texas)
8. 2007 Dydo Japan Cup (Tokyo, Japan)
9. **2011 PBA Tournament of Champions** (Las Vegas, Nevada), bowled televised 299
10. 2012 Round 1 Japan Cup (Tokyo, Japan)
11. 2012 PBA-WBT Qatar Open (Doha, Qatar)
12. 2013 PBA-WBT Vienna Open (Vienna, Austria)
13. 2014 Brunswick Ballmaster Open (Helsinki, Finland)
14. 2014 WSOB Viper Championship (Las Vegas, Nevada)

=== PBA50 Tour ===
1. **2018 Suncoast PBA Senior U.S. Open** (Las Vegas, NV)
2. 2025 PBA50 Petraglia Championship (Jackson, Michigan)
3. **2026 Bud Moore PBA50 Players Championship** (Sterling, Virginia)

== Personal life ==
While born and raised in Finland, Mika resided in Hartland, Michigan, USA during his full-time PBA Tour years. He now resides in Traverse City, Michigan. He has a wife, Leena, and two children, Ida-Sofia and Lidia.

In later TV appearances, the back of his bowling shirt had his name spelled phonetically (koy-voo-nee-em-ee).

His aunt, Paula Koivuniemi, is one of the most popular schlager singers in Finland.

== Sources ==
- PBA.com, official site of the Professional Bowlers Association and the Lumber Liquidators PBA Tour
