= Parker Bohn III =

American professional ten-pin bowler

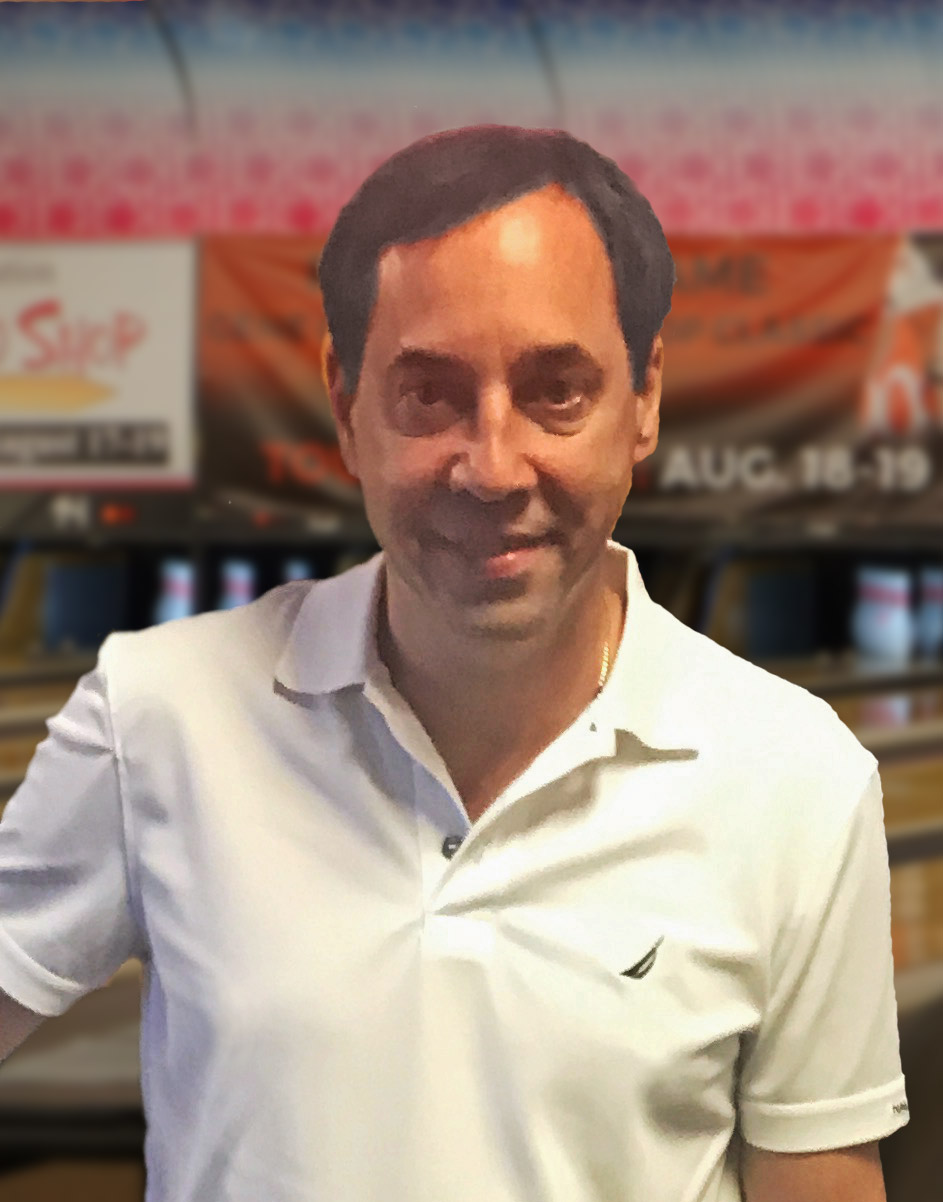
- Bohn in 2018

Personal information
- Born: Parker Morse Bohn III; July 13, 1963 (age 63) Jackson Township, New Jersey, U.S.
- Years active: 1984–present
- Height: 180 cm (5 ft 11 in)
- Website: www.parkerbohn.com

Bowling Information
- Country: United States
- Sport: Ten-pin bowling
- League: PBA
- Rookie year: 1984
- Dominant hand: Left (stroker delivery)
- Sponsors: Brunswick

Achievements and titles
- World finals: 2 EBT
- National finals: 35 PBA Tour (3 majors); 11 PBA50 Tour (2 majors); 2 PBA60 Tour (1 major); 22 PBA Regional Tour; 17 PBA50 Regional Tour

Parker Morse Bohn III (born July 13, 1963) is an American left-handed professional ten-pin bowler. He has been a member of the Professional Bowlers Association (PBA) since 1984, and is a member of the PBA and USBC Halls of Fame. Bohn is one of only eight players in PBA history to accumulate at least 30 career PBA Tour titles, currently ranking fifth all-time with 35 (including three majors). He has 11 more titles (two majors) on the PBA50 Tour (formerly PBA Senior Tour). He is a two-time PBA Player of the Year (1999, 2001–02) and has won a PBA50 Player of the Year award (2022). Bohn has also earned 2 PBA60 Tour titles, 22 PBA Regional Tour titles, 17 PBA50 Regional titles, and two European Bowling Tour (EBT) titles.

Bohn has earned over $3.3 million in PBA events — only the fourth PBA player to top the $3 million mark. Bohn also won the $150,000 winner-take-all prize in the 2008 Motel 6 Roll to Riches event, but the earnings in this event did not count toward PBA career totals. Through the 2018 season, he had thrown 114 career perfect 300 games in PBA competition, including the 13th PBA nationally televised 300 game at the 1998 ABC Masters in Reno, Nevada.

Bohn has been a member of the Brunswick pro staff since 1984, and continues to have a role with the company through the present day.

== PBA Tour ==
Bohn's best career stretch was from 1997 through 2001–02, during which he won 18 titles overall and at least one title each season. His best single season came in 1999, when he won five titles and earned PBA Player of the Year honors. The '99 season featured a streak in which Parker won eight consecutive televised matches. His 1999 single-season average of 228.03 ranks fourth all-time. He would also be named Player of the Year in the 2001–02 season, a year highlighted by a major championship title at the 2001 ABC Masters.

Bohn won his second major tournament at age 49 by winning the PBA World Championship in January 2013. He joined the PBA50 Tour (formerly PBA Senior Tour) in 2014, while continuing to bowl on the standard PBA Tour until 2015.

The 52-year-old Bohn won his 35th PBA Tour title at the PBA Cheetah Championship in December 2015, topping England's Paul Moor in the final match, 210–206. The win broke the career titles tie Bohn held with Mark Roth, moving him alone into fifth-place all time. Coupled with Bohn's win at the PBA Players Championship, at 51 years, 217 days old, earlier in the year, 2015 marked the first time he won multiple titles in a season since 2001–02. His win was a breakthrough as he had finished runner-up at the Players Championship in 1993, 1996, 1998, and 1999. Bohn was retroactively awarded a major title for his 2015 PBA Players Championship victory. After the tournament returned to major status in the 2016 season, the PBA voted to award additional major titles to the winners of the three previous Players Championship events (2011, 2013, 2015), stating the tournament "is a members-only event, and includes all of the elements of a major." This gave Bohn three majors among his 35 PBA Tour titles.

Bohn is a four-time winner of the PBA's Steve Nagy Sportsmanship award. Highly active in promoting youth bowling, Bohn has established an annual Parker Bohn III Youth Scholarship Tournament in Howell, New Jersey. The tournament, which awards junior bowlers with college scholarship funding, is in its 21st year as of 2020. Parker won the PBA's very first Tony Reyes Community Service Award for the 2012–13 season.

In 2011, Bohn won the Dick Weber Bowling Ambassador Award, an honor given annually by the Bowling Proprietors Association of America (BPAA) to the "bowling athlete who has consistently shown grace on and off the lanes by promoting the sport of bowling in a positive manner."

At age 60, Bohn was part of the Waco Wonders PBA League team, winners of the 2023 Elias Cup.

== Additional titles and accomplishments ==
In addition to his PBA Tour titles, Bohn III has won 11 PBA50 Tour titles, the most recent one coming in May 2024. Among the four 2022 titles were Bohn's first two PBA50 major championships (PBA50 National Championship and PBA50 Cup). Bohn III joins Tom Baker, Walter Ray Williams Jr., Pete Weber and Amleto Monacelli as the only players in history to amass at least ten titles on both the PBA and PBA50 Tours. Bohn's accomplishments earned him PBA50 Player of the Year honors for the 2022 season.

Parker has also won 1 PBA60 Tour title, 27 PBA Regional titles, nine PBA50 Regional titles, plus two European Bowling Tour (EBT) titles that were not considered PBA titles at the time (2013 BNC Bratislava Open and the 2016 Brunswick Ballmaster Open, held in Helsinki, Finland).

Bohn holds the PBA record for the highest pinfall in a 56-game qualifying block, both scratch (13,540) and with bonus pins (13,990). He also holds the scratch (14,924) and with bonus pins (15,479) records for a 64-game block. Both records were set in the 1999 season.

Despite being 37 years old at the turn of the century, Bohn ranked #13 on the PBA's 2025 "Best 25 PBA Players of the Last 25 Seasons" list. The ranking was based on a points system that took into account standard titles, major titles, top-five finishes and Player of the Year awards.

On May 31, 2026, Bohn won the USBC Super Senior Classic, an open tournament for players age 60 and older. He led the tournament from the start and averaged 250.7, defeating Andy Neuer in the final match.

== Personal life ==
Bohn was born in Jackson Township, New Jersey. He currently lives in New Jersey with his wife, Leslie (Beamish), and three children: sons Justin and Brandon, and daughter Sydney. He has two adult sons, Parker IV and Evan, from his first marriage. Justin, Brandon and Sydney have all competed at a high level in Junior Gold bowling, most recently in 2022. Justin was crowned champion of the 2022 U20 Junior Boys finals, while Brandon earned the championship in the Boys U18 division (his second consecutive year taking the top spot). Both Justin and Brandon earned a spot on Junior Team USA 2023 with their victories. Sydney placed sixth her first time competing in the Girls U18 division, one year after finishing third in the U15 field.

On December 8, 2024, Parker and son Brandon won the PBA/PBA50 Select Key Motors Bristol Baker Doubles, a PBA/PBA50 Regional event held in Bristol, Virginia.

Parker is the brother-in-law of fellow PBA Hall of Famer, Doug Kent (Doug's wife Chrissie and Parker's wife Leslie are sisters). Parker Bohn (the first), PBIII's grandfather, was a five-time stock car (Modifieds and Sportsmen) racing champion at Wall (NJ) Stadium near his home at the Jersey Shore. His uncle (his mother's brother, Vincent Manniello) was a member of Bruce Springsteen's early band the Castiles.

In addition to his tournament play, Bohn is currently a member of the PBA League Bowler Certification Advisory Board.

== In the media ==
Besides making regular appearances on ABC-TV, CBS-TV and ESPN during his years on the PBA tour, Bohn has authored a book (with text by Dan Herbst) called Bowling: How to Master the Game (Universe Publishing).

A bowling arcade game also bears his name: Parker Bohn III Pro Bowler. The full-motion video game features audio voice-over by Parker himself.

Bohn appeared in the movie Kingpin with Woody Harrelson for a brief scene. He also appeared as Frank Cache in episode 10 of the Japanese television drama Golden Bowl, bowling against Shu Akutagawa (played by Takeshi Kaneshiro.) During one part of the episode, Bohn bowls right-handed (his opposite hand), deliberately throwing the game to show his disdain for his opponent.

Bohn has also appeared in a television commercial for Lumber Liquidators, where he is shown attempting to throw a bowling ball on new hardwood floors only to be stopped by his wife, Leslie.

He is one of the professional opponents in the "PBA® Bowling Challenge" game for Android and iOS devices.

== Awards and recognition ==
- Inducted into PBA Hall of Fame, 2000
- Inducted into USBC Hall of Fame, 2008
- 2x PBA Player of the Year (1999, 2001–02)
- PBA50 Player of the Year (2022)
- 2000 Best Bowler ESPY Award winner
- Harry Smith PBA Points Leader award (1999, 2001–02)
- George Young PBA High Average award (1999, 2001–02)
- 4x PBA Steve Nagy Sportsmanship award (1990, 1991, 1992, 1993)
- Ranked #10 in the PBA's 2008 list of "50 Greatest Players of the Last 50 Years"
- Won the 2011 BPAA Dick Weber Bowling Ambassador award
- Won the 2012–13 PBA Tony Reyes Community Service Award
- Ranked #13 on the PBA's 2025 "Best 25 Players of the Last 25 Seasons" list

== Career tour titles ==
=== PBA Tour Titles ===
Major championships are in bold text.

1. 1987 Columbia 300 Open, Seattle, WA.
2. 1989 Brunswick Memorial World Open, Glendale Heights, IL.
3. 1990 Don Carter Classic, Kenner, LA.
4. 1990 Quality Inns International Summer Classic, Edmond, OK.
5. 1990 American Bowling Congress Fall Classic, Milwaukee, WI.
6. 1992 El Paso Open, El Paso, TX.
7. 1992 Beaumont PBA Doubles Classic w/Hugh Miller, Beaumont, TX.
8. 1992 Oronamin C Japan Cup, Tokyo, Japan.
9. 1993 Phoenix Open, Phoenix, AZ.
10. 1993 Merit Mixed Doubles Championship w/Aleta Sill, Reno, NV.
11. 1995 Columbia 300 Open, Austin, TX.
12. 1997 AC-Delco Classic, Lakewood, CA.
13. 1997 Showboat Invitational, Las Vegas, NV.
14. 1998 Brentwood Classic, Brentwood, CA.
15. 1998 Greater Detroit Open, Taylor, MI.
16. 1998 Greater Harrisburg Open, Harrisburg, PA.
17. 1998 Oronamin C Japan Cup, Tokyo, Japan.
18. 1999 Columbia 300 Open, Austin, TX.
19. 1999 Empire State Open, Latham, NY.
20. 1999 Showboat Invitational, Las Vegas, NV.
21. 1999 Oronamin C Japan Cup, Tokyo Japan.
22. 1999 Track/Dexter Open, Canandaigua, NY.
23. 2000 Chattanooga Open, Chattanooga TN.
24. 2000 Oronamin C Japan Cup, Tokyo, Japan.
25. 2001-02 NBS National/Senior Doubles w/Rohn Morton, Reno, NV.
26. 2001-02 Parker Bohn III Empire State Open, Latham, NY.
27. 2001-02 **ABC Masters**, Reno, Nev.
28. 2001-02 PBA Earl Anthony Memorial Classic, Kirkland, WA.
29. 2001-02 PBA Battle at Little Creek, Virginia Beach, VA.
30. 2004-05 PBA El Paso Classic, El Paso, TX.
31. 2007-08 Spartanburg Classic, Spartanburg, SC.
32. 2008-09 PBA Cheetah Championship, Cheektowaga, NY.
33. 2012-13 **PBA World Championship**, Las Vegas, NV.
34. 2015 **PBA Players Championship**, Wauwatosa, WI.
35. 2015 PBA Cheetah Championship, Reno, NV.

=== PBA50 Tour Titles ===
1. 2014 PBA50 Miller High Life Classic, Mooresville, NC.
2. 2015 PBA50 Pasco County Florida Open, Pasco County, FL.
3. 2015 PBA50 Treasure Island Resort & Casino Open, Welch, MN.
4. 2017 PBA50 Dave Small’s Championship Lanes Classic, Anderson, IN.
5. 2021 PBA50 Dave Small's Championship Lanes Open, Anderson, IN.
6. 2021 PBA50 Spectrum Lanes Open, Wyoming, MI.
7. 2022 **PBA50 National Championship**, The Villages, FL.
8. 2022 PBA50 Mooresville Open, Mooresville, NC.
9. 2022 **PBA50 Cup**, Westland, MI.
10. 2022 PBA50 Spectrum Lanes Open, Wyoming, MI.
11. 2024 PBA50 The Villages Classic, The Villages, FL.

=== PBA60 Tour Titles ===
1. 2025 PBA60 Webb Championship, Columbus, OH.
2. 2026 **PBA60 USBC Super Senior Classic**, Las Vegas, NV.
