= Doug Kent =

American ten-pin bowler

Personal information
- Born: February 9, 1967 (age 59) Macedon, New York, U.S.
- Years active: 1988–present

Bowling Information
- Affiliation: PBA
- Rookie year: 1989
- Dominant hand: Right (power stroker delivery)
- Wins: 10 PBA Tour (4 majors)

Doug Kent (born February 9, 1967) is a right-handed American professional ten-pin bowler, a member of the Professional Bowlers Association (PBA), and a PBA and USBC Hall of Famer. In the 2006–07 season, Kent became just the sixth bowler in PBA history to win two major championships in one tour year as he captured titles in the USBC Masters and Denny's PBA World Championship. For his efforts, he was voted the Chris Schenkel PBA Player of the Year and received a four-year exemption for PBA Tour events.

== PBA career ==
Doug Kent joined the PBA in 1988. His career started slowly, making his first telecast at the 1990 PBA National Championship and losing his second match to finish in fourth place. However, an impressive feat came from that match, when he converted the 4-6-7-9-10 split, a pin leave referred to as the "Greek Church". He would not win his first title until breaking through with the 1991 ABC Masters championship. A long title drought followed for five seasons, until earning a victory at the 1996 PBA Greater Detroit Open. Following three more standard titles, Kent won his second major at the 2002 PBA World Championship, cashing a then-record $120,000 winner's share.

2006–07 was a career year for Kent. He won two titles, both of them majors (2006 USBC Masters and 2007 Denny's PBA World Championship), giving him four majors among his ten total PBA titles. After earning a career-best $200,530 that season, Kent also captured the $150,000 winner-take-all prize in the 2007 Motel 6 Roll to Riches, a special season-ending event that did not count toward official PBA earnings. His career PBA earnings total over $1.53 million (through 2019). He has rolled 31 career perfect 300 games in PBA competition through the end of the 2019 season.

Kent was ranked #43 on the PBA's 2008 list of "50 Greatest Players of the Last 50 Years." He was voted into the PBA Hall of Fame in January 2013, and was officially inducted on March 30, 2013 (along with Danny Wiseman). In 2014, Doug was elected to the USBC Hall of Fame for Superior Performance.

Kent went into semi-retirement from the PBA Tour after the 2008–09 season, bowling in only a few events per year through 2019.

=== PBA National Tour career titles ===
Major championships are in bold.

1. **1991 ABC Masters** – Def. George Branham III 50–28 in a two-frame roll-off after tying 236–236
2. 1996 Greater Detroit Open – Def. Jeff Zaffino 227–217
3. 1997 Japan Cup – Def. Parker Bohn III 237–231
4. 1999 Johnny Petraglia Open – Def. Rudy Kasimakis 217–190
5. 2000 Indianapolis Open – Def. Jeff Zaffino 253–236
6. **2001–02 PBA World Championship** – Def. Lonnie Waliczek 215–160
7. 2002–03 Empire State Open – Def. Chris Barnes 257–204
8. 2005–06 GEICO Classic – Def. Norm Duke 222–201
9. **2006–07 USBC Masters** – Def. Jack Jurek 277–230
10. **2006–07 PBA World Championship** – Def. Chris Barnes 237–216

== Awards and achievements ==
- 2006–07 Chris Schenkel PBA Player of the Year
- One of only nine PBA players (through 2019) to win multiple major titles in the same season (2006–07)
- 2013 PBA Hall of Fame inductee (Superior Performance category)
- 2014 USBC Hall of Fame inductee (Superior Performance category)

== Personal ==
Kent resides in Newark, New York, with wife, Chrissie, and children, Natalie and Jacob. Natalie is a successful youth bowler as well. Because Kent married the former Chrissie Beamish, whose sister, Leslie, is married to Parker Bohn III, Kent is Bohn's brother-in-law, making them the second-ever brothers-in-law to be inducted into the PBA Hall of Fame; the first pair of which being Steve Cook and Mike Aulby. Kent also operates Doug Kent's Rose Bowl Lanes in Newark. Kent's nickname on tour is "Dougie Fresh," based on his ability to score well on fresh-oiled lanes and jump out to early leads in tournament qualifying. Doug Kent Lane, a street in Newark, New York, was recently named in honor of his accomplishments.

Fellow New Yorker Patrick Allen asked Kent to be the presenter at his PBA Hall of Fame induction on January 5, 2019. In his induction speech, Allen noted, "Doug was responsible for two careers: his own and mine. He told me I had to learn the technical side of the sport, and then he taught me."
