= Pete Weber (bowler) =

American professional bowler

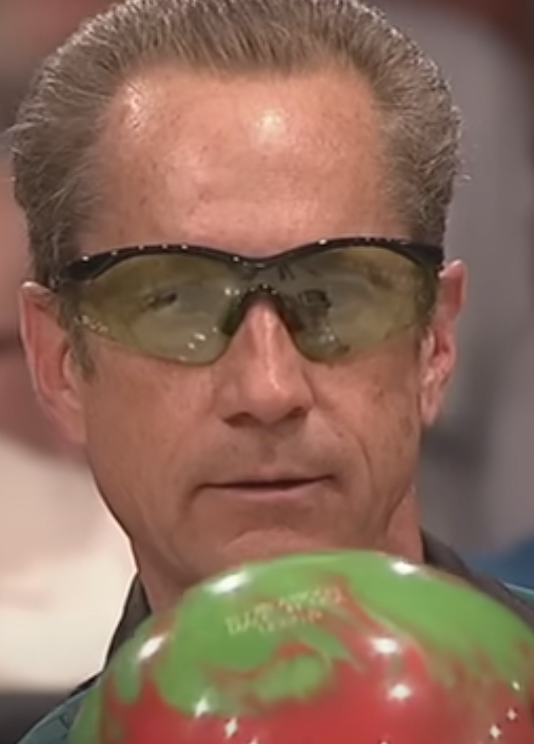
- Weber at the 2012 U.S. Open

Personal information
- Nickname: PDW
- Born: Peter David Weber; August 21, 1962 (age 64) St. Ann, Missouri, U.S.
- Years active: 1979 – present
- Height: 5 ft 7 in (170 cm)
- Parents: Dick Weber (father); Juanita Weber (mother)

Sport
- Country: United States
- Sport: Ten-pin bowling
- League: PBA
- Turned pro: 1979

Achievements and titles
- World finals: 1 European Bowling Tour
- National finals: 37 PBA Tour titles (10 majors); 14 PBA50 Tour titles (6 majors); 1 PBA60 Tour title 48 PBA Regional Tour titles 9 PBA50 Regional Tour titles 2x PBA50 Player of the Year; 2023 PBA60 Player of the Year

Peter David Weber (born August 21, 1962) is an American bowler in the Professional Bowlers Association (PBA), currently competing on the exclusive to their age-group PBA50+ tours (PBA50 and PBA60), and a member of the PBA and USBC Halls of Fame.

Weber was one of the sport's most active players and became known for his maverick, chirpy and rebellious personality. He is also known for being versatile, with his high backswing and the side rotation he puts on the bowling ball helping him control numerous oil conditions.

Weber is featured in the ten-pin bowling sports documentary A League of Ordinary Gentlemen. He has won 37 titles on the PBA Tour (fourth all-time), including ten major championships (tied for second all-time), and another 14 titles (six majors) on the PBA50 Tour, and another title on the PBA60 Tour. He is one of only three bowlers in history (with Walter Ray Williams Jr. and Earl Anthony) to have amassed at least 50 combined titles between the PBA Tour and PBA50+ Tours. Weber and Williams Jr. are the only two bowlers to have amassed at least 100 total PBA titles, with PBA Regional events added. (Weber currently has 110 total titles with his 48 PBA Regional Tour and nine PBA50 Regional Tour wins included.) He is tied with Chris Warren for the most wins on the regular PBA Regional Tour.

Weber has won bowling's U.S. Open a record five times, breaking the previous record of his father, Dick Weber, who won the event four times in his career. Among the nine players in history to win the PBA's triple crown (U.S. Open, PBA World Championship and PBA Tournament of Champions), Weber is the only bowler to win each of these events at least twice in a career. He has also won the PBA Senior U.S. Open twice, and is a two-time PBA50 Player of the Year, in addition to winning PBA60 Player of the Year in his first full season.

== Early life ==
Weber grew up in Florissant, Missouri, and as the son of bowling superstar Dick Weber, was introduced to the sport at the age of two. At the age of 15, Weber was already winning local bowling tournaments against adult players, and won his first PBA Regional Tour event (as a non-member) at age 16. With the help of his father, Pete was able to become a PBA member at the age of 17 (the former policy required a minimum age of 18). In 1979, Weber bowled in his first event on the professional circuit and participated in 20 tour events during the 1980 season, making one televised finals appearance. Weber won Rookie of the Year honors in 1980. By 1982, he had won his first PBA title, winning two that season. By the time he was 24 years old, he had already reached the 10-title plateau (becoming the youngest player in PBA history to attain that mark). At age 26, he narrowly won the PBA National Championship over Dave Ferraro, giving him all three jewels of the PBA's "triple crown" (achieved by winning the U.S. Open, Tournament of Champions and PBA National Championship).

== Career ==
=== PBA Tour ===
Weber and his father, Dick, were the first father-and-son combination to ever both earn a title on the PBA Tour. The feat has since been matched four times, by Don/Jimmy Johnson (1990), Don/Eugene McCune (2002), Guppy/Kyle Troup (2015) and Eugene/Kevin McCune (2023).

Weber is the youngest player to reach 10 PBA titles, accomplishing the feat in 1987 at age 24 years, 247 days. His 16th PBA Tour title on March 2, 1991, at the Fair Lanes Open was earned "on the bench" in one of the PBA's most infamous incidents. Weber struck three times in the tenth frame of the title match, forcing his opponent, Del Ballard Jr., to get two strikes and seven pins in his final frame to win. Ballard rolled the two strikes, but then sent his fill shot into the right gutter, handing Weber the championship.

On April 17, 1993, Weber won his 20th Tour title at the IOF Foresters Bowling for Miracles Open, giving him the record of youngest to win 20 career Tour titles at the age of 30 years, 239 days. Six months later, Weber would win his 21st Tour title at the Oronamin C Japan Cup, giving him titles in 11 of the last 12 seasons, and multiple titles in 8 of those seasons. Weber would not win his 22nd Tour title until the 1997 PBA Tour season, the longest winless streak in his professional career. In the 2003–04 season, he won two titles, including his 30th title and his third U.S. Open, and earned a career-high $206,217. On December 4, 2005, Weber overcame a year of trying times both personally and professionally by clinching what was, perhaps, the most emotional title of his career at the 2005 Bowlersparadise.com Classic at Stardust Bowl in Hammond, Indiana. This marked the first television appearance for Weber in 666 days, and it was his first title after the death of his father on February 13, 2005. Weber honored his father after the victory by looking into the ESPN cameras and pointing at the "DW" patch on his sleeve.

Overall, Weber has won 37 PBA Tour events, including ten major titles (tied with Earl Anthony for the second most majors all-time). Three of his last four PBA Tour victories were in major championships. His 37th tour win on March 31, 2013, came at age 50 in the Tournament of Champions. His 37 wins place him fourth on the all-time PBA tour titles list, behind only Walter Ray Williams, Jr. (47), Earl Anthony (43) and Norm Duke (40). Weber's 35th Tour win at the end of the 2009-10 season against Mike Scroggins at the 2010 Marathon Open in the title match ensured Walter Ray Williams Jr. his record 7th Player of the Year award, as well as making Williams (then age 50) the oldest ever to win that award. Had Weber lost the title match, Scroggins would have been named Player of the Year for that season.

Weber has rolled 85 perfect 300 games in PBA competition through 2018. His five U.S. Open titles are the most of any bowler in PBA history. He also had a runner-up finish in the 1987 U.S. Open. Weber is one of eight PBA players to have earned the career PBA Triple Crown. Upon winning the 2013 Tournament of Champions title, he became the first bowler to win all three jewels of the Triple Crown at least twice in a career (five U.S. Open titles, two PBA World Championship titles, and two wins in the Tournament of Champions). He is also the oldest winner of the U.S. Open (49) and Tournament of Champions (50). The Tournament of Champions win at age 50 years, 222 days made him the oldest player to win a PBA Tour major title that was considered a major at the time of victory. (Ernie Schlegel won the 1996 USBC Masters at age 53 before it was considered a PBA major; he was retroactively credited with a major due to a 2008 rule change.) Weber's other major win was in the Touring Players Championship. The only major that has eluded him is the USBC Masters among the regular majors. Weber would finish runner-up at the Masters in 1983 to Mike Lastowski, 189–202, and again in 2000, losing to Mika Koivuniemi in the final. Despite throwing the last 6 consecutive strikes, Weber finished with a 235 game, which was 1 pin shy of Koivuniemi's final 236 score. Among senior majors, he has yet to win the Tournament of Champions or the USBC Super Senior Classic (part of the USBC Senior Masters, was first eligible in 2023).

Along with Mike Aulby, Parker Bohn III, Norm Duke, and Walter Ray Williams Jr., Weber is one of only five bowlers to have won at least one standard PBA Tour title in four different decades (1980s, 1990s, 2000s and 2010s). However, a feat that sets him apart from his contemporaries is that he has won a U.S. Open title in the same four consecutive decades, specifically in 1988, 1991, 2004, 2007, and 2012.

Weber joined his father in the PBA Hall of Fame in 1998, and he became a member of the United States Bowling Congress Hall of Fame in 2002. His career PBA Tour earnings of over $4 million (through the 2019 season) place him second all-time, behind only all-time titles leader Walter Ray Williams, Jr. Weber and Williams are the only two PBA bowlers to have topped the $4 million mark in career earnings. Weber owns 48 PBA Regional titles, the most all-time, in addition to four PBA50 Regional titles.

Weber was ranked 4th on the PBA's 2008 list of "50 Greatest Players of the Last 50 Years," one place behind his father.

At age 58, Weber participated in World Series of Bowling XII and made the Round of 16 match play at the 2021 PBA Scorpion Championship. Prior to match play on March 17, he announced that this would be his last event as an active national PBA Tour member, choosing to focus on Regional and PBA50 Tour events. As he completed his bowling that day, Weber said to the FloBowling cameras:

It's been an honor and a privilege to be part of the Professional Bowlers Association for 41 years. I appreciate all the fans I have, who hate me or love me. You watched. That's all you could do.

Over his 41-year PBA Tour career, Weber made the final match 67 times, going 37–30 in those matches, and made the top five 152 times (second all-time).

Despite being 38 years old at the turn of the century, Weber ranked #11 on the PBA's 2025 "Best 25 PBA Players of the Last 25 Seasons" list. The ranking was based on a points system that took into account standard titles, major titles, top-five finishes and Player of the Year awards. Said PBA.com writer Nolan Hughes: "Weber notched just 54 top-five finishes post-2000, ranking 13th among all players, yet only five players won more than Weber's four majors. That sums up the latter half of Weber's transcendent career. Even when his body didn't allow him to be the consistent force he once was, he rose to the occasion in the game's biggest moments.

=== PBA50+ (PBA50 and PBA60) ===
Weber joined the PBA50 Tour (formerly PBA Senior Tour) in 2013. His first title on that tour was a major: the 2013 USBC Senior Masters, which he won on June 14. He also won the last PBA50 Tour tournament of the season on his 51st birthday and earned Rookie of the Year honors.

Weber won a second PBA50 major title, his fourth PBA50 title overall, at the Suncoast PBA Senior U.S. Open on June 5, 2015. The win made Pete the second player in history, after Norm Duke, to win the U.S. Open on both the standard PBA Tour and the PBA50 Tour. Weber was named the PBA50 Player of the Year for the 2015 season, after dominating in the earnings, average and competition points categories. It was his first PBA Player of the Year win of any kind.

On May 10, 2016, Weber won the BVL Johnny Petraglia Open on the PBA50 Tour for his third consecutive title in the 2016 season, and seventh PBA50 title overall. He joined fellow PBA Hall of Famer Tom Baker as the only players to ever win three consecutive PBA50 Tour events. In the next PBA50 Tour stop, Weber successfully defended his 2015 PBA Senior U.S. Open crown, and became the only bowler to win four consecutive PBA50 Tour events. Although the winning streak was stopped in the next tournament, Weber made history again later in the season. His victory at the 2016 USBC Senior Masters on June 26 made him the first bowler ever to win five titles in a single PBA50 Tour season. Weber's unprecedented PBA50 season continued on July 28, when he won his sixth title of 2016 in the PBA50 South Shore Open. Despite missing the last three events of the 2016 season due to a hip injury, Weber easily won his second consecutive PBA50 Player of the Year award with 457,200 points – more than 200,000 above the next closest player (Amleto Monacelli with 241,680 points). Weber also averaged a PBA50 record 237.03 for the season, almost nine pins ahead of second-place Norm Duke (228.31).

In the 2017 PBA50 season finale on August 8, Weber won his 11th PBA50 title, capturing the DeHayes Insurance Group Championship held in Fort Wayne, Indiana. This victory gave Weber 100 total PBA titles (37 PBA Tour, 11 PBA50 Tour, 48 PBA Regional Tour and four PBA50 Regional Tour). Walter Ray Williams Jr. is the only other bowler to reach this total.

On April 29, 2021, Weber won his 12th PBA50 Tour title (and first since 2017) in the Florida Blue Medicare PBA50 National Championship for his fifth PBA50 major. One week later, on May 5, Weber made it back-to-back PBA50 championships, earning his 13th title at the PBA50 Granville Financial Open, his 50th national tournament win in PBA-sanctioned competition (regular and PBA50).

On August 10, 2023, Weber won his 14th PBA50 Tour title and sixth PBA50 major championship at the Bud Moore PBA50 Players Championship in Sterling, Virginia.

On October 18, 2023, Weber won the PBA60 Player of the Year in his first season of eligibility.

Weber is one of only five bowlers in history (with Walter Ray Williams Jr., Tom Baker, Amleto Monacelli and Parker Bohn III) to have won at least 10 titles on both the standard PBA Tour and the PBA50 Tour. Pete and his father, Dick, are two of the eight players in history (with Dave Soutar, Johnny Petraglia, Walter Ray Williams Jr., Amleto Monacelli, Parker Bohn III and Norm Duke) who have won a PBA Tour or PBA50 Tour title in five different decades.

In February 2024, after participating in his namesake tournament (the 2024 Pete Weber Missouri Classic), Pete announced his full retirement from the main PBA tour, but continues on the age-restricted senior tours, where at the time the reigning Player of the Year on the PBA60 tour. Weber will continue to participate in team tournaments on the main tour where one player on each team is a PBA50 or PBA60 player, such as the PBA All-Star events at The Barn at Phoenix Raceway and PBA/PBA50/PWBA Jonesboro Trios.

On July 6, 2026, Weber scored his 52nd total PBA national touring title and first PBA60 win at the PBA60 World Series of Bowling II Mark Roth Classic in Columbus, Ohio, defeating Chris Warren in the final, 277-235.

=== Other achievements ===
Weber claimed his first career European Bowling Tour title in 2008, in the 30th Trofeu Internacional, July 22–27, 2008, Ciutat de Barcelona at Bowling Pedralbes in Barcelona, Spain.

When Pete won his first PBA title in 1982, it was the first time a father (Dick Weber) and son had each captured PBA titles. This has since happened four more times (Don and Jimmy Johnson, Don and Eugene McCune, Guppy and Kyle Troup, Eugene and Kevin McCune).

Weber is one of only 13 players in PBA history to start in the 24th and final spot of the match play round and go on to win a tournament. He and Mike Aulby are the only two players to accomplish this feat twice. Weber did so in 1984, and again in 1991.

On ESPN's Cold Pizza he mentioned that he has made the 7-10 split four times in his career. He also noted that he is a near-scratch golfer and has six career holes-in-one.

Weber won the 2013 ESPY Award for Best Bowler, defeating fellow nominees Jason Belmonte and Scott Norton.

== Controversy ==
By the early 1980s, Weber had established himself as one of the best bowlers in the world, but his lifestyle saw numerous long binges of alcohol and cocaine use. In a 1985 Sports Illustrated article, Weber admitted to spending a four-week stretch on tour in a "complete blackout"—staying up for days on end with cocaine, and drinking a fifth of Jack Daniel's every night. Pete estimated he blew through about $150,000 between 1982 and 1984 on cocaine, alcohol and gambling. He once bragged about hitting the lanes one evening and scoring in the high 200s after spending the day drinking full-strength Long Island iced teas. He entered rehab in March 1984, ending what his famous father called "eight years of hell". Though Weber says he never used cocaine again, he has been open about the fact that he has continued to struggle with alcohol addiction.

Despite Weber's talent, he was not popular with his bowling peers and was even denied Player of the Year honors in 1987 despite winning the Tournament of Champions and leading the tour in earnings; his peers’ votes awarded it to Marshall Holman, making Holman the first, and only, Player of the Year with 0 titles for the season. By 1989, Weber had won 13 PBA Tour titles and had reached over $1 million (USD) in earnings, but he had also served five PBA suspensions during the decade and his personal life was plagued with problems.

By the mid-1990s, Weber had been through two divorces. He went through a three-season stretch (1994–96) without winning a title, and he failed to make a championship round appearance during the entire 1995 season. At the same time, the PBA Tour itself was in decline and was nearing insolvency.

Weber began a slow turnaround in 1997, for which he gave much of the credit to third wife Tracy. "Tracy is the best thing that ever happened to me," he said. "She keeps me focused and keeps me loose." Weber won two titles in the 1997 season, and established a then-career high in earnings with over $181,000.

In 2000, the PBA Tour was sold to three former Microsoft executives, who installed Steve Miller, a former Nike marketing executive, to resurrect the sport at the professional level. Weber was not on the tour during this transitional phase, as he was still serving a suspension for "conduct unbecoming a professional" given by the former PBA leadership due to a late 1999 incident at a Bay City, Michigan pro-am related to his drinking problem. The new tour ownership saw Weber's flashiness as a potential tool for marketing the PBA to a new audience. By the 2001–02 season, Weber had his career back on track, winning three titles in all. In one of the three victories, at the Great Lakes Classic in Grand Rapids, Michigan, Weber rolled a nationally televised 299 game, leaving a 4-pin standing on his final shot. Steve Miller noted that in the early 2000s, ESPN's bowling telecasts had more viewers than NHL hockey. In an interview during the season, Weber remarked:

The new PBA has told me to be animated, and I was already animated to begin with. The new PBA likes me, likes my antics. They think that's what's going to sell the PBA.

Weber's attitude on television has given him a reputation as a brash "action bowler," which some critics view as unsportsmanlike. After icing a 289–279 victory in a televised match against Michael Haugen Jr., who was looking for his first PBA win at the 2001 Greater Louisville Open, Weber walked back on the approach toward Haugen and shouted, "He ain't getting his first one against me, no way!" During the 2010 One-A-Day Dick Weber Open, he became frustrated after hearing the sound of a photographer's camera click just before letting go of the ball, and verbally told them to refrain from flashing the camera during his approach.

=== "Who do you think you are? I AM!" ===
In the 2012 U.S. Open finals, Weber repeatedly confronted a young audience member. The fan first applauded when Weber missed a spare, and the spat continued when Pete believed the fan was intentionally distracting him on his shots. Weber eventually won the 2012 event, his unprecedented fifth U.S. Open title, getting a strike on the fill shot of the tenth frame to defeat Mike Fagan by one pin, 215–214. Weber exploded in a burst of rage and excitement, directing his elation assertively to the audience and camera crews in and around the lane approach:

Gary Thorne, ESPN announcer: Strike to claim it, a strike to claim it, and...he got it!

Weber: Yes, god damn it, yes! That is right, I did it! [That's] number five! Are you kidding me?! That's right! Who do you think you are? I am! Damn it right!

The video footage of Weber's reaction to his win went viral on the Internet and made the Top 10 on ESPN's "SportsNation 101 Celebration Fails" list. His "Who do you think you are? I am!" quote ended up on T-shirts. Weber later explained he intended to say, "Who do you think you are rooting against me? I am the man in this tournament!" Weber clarified his comments were directed towards a young heckler who was jeering him throughout the finals telecast, at times during Weber's approach.

It's easy to look at this moment and view it as a failure because it ended up on so many blooper reels. That's not the way I view it. The intensity, and the way it came out, and how fired up that guy was? I think it's the greatest moment in the history of professional bowling. (Randy Pedersen, PBA Hall of Famer and longtime TV bowling analyst)

After taking time to cool down, Weber was humble in his post-tournament interview. When the announcer stated that Pete had just passed his father and Don Carter in career U.S. Open titles, Weber replied, "I'll never say I'm better than them. They paved the way for us to be here. It was an honor and a privilege to join them when I won my fourth U.S. Open, and it's even more of an honor to be the first one to win five."

In response to critics, Weber said in a 2016 interview:

I've never cared what other people thought about me. I haven't changed my attitude, my approach to the game one bit. I'm very emotional out there; nothing I do is planned or rehearsed. When I react, it's a spur-of-the-moment thing. I like to show my emotion, and I think that helps keep me loose. I'm pretty sure if you watch somebody walk up, throw the ball and then go back and sit down over and over, you're not going to want to watch bowling very much.

== Legacy ==
While there are divided opinions on Pete Weber's PBA legacy, the majority conclude that he had a positive impact on resurrecting the sport's popularity. PBA Commissioner Tom Clark stated that when Weber made the finals telecast, ratings went up. Hall of Famer Norm Duke, who also started on Tour while in his teens, was quoted in 2021 saying, "Pete can reach out through a television, grab you by the neck, turn your head toward him and say. 'Oh no, no, no. You might want to watch this.' And people do. It speaks to his entertainment value."

Mike Fagan, who once noted that Pete was alienating the very fans the sport wanted to attract, stated years later, "He has been the most noteworthy person in the sport for 40 years. Sometimes good, sometimes bad. But he made bowling fun again."

Jason Belmonte, who surpassed Pete's record of 10 major titles in 2019, once stated: "These people who think Pete's a joke, or think he's crazy, they're doing something that they never thought they were going to do, and that's watch bowling. To have someone that's able to draw that fan base into our sport? We're in debt to Pete for the rest of our lives. He made bowling watchable."

After his team won the AFC Championship on January 29, 2023, Kansas City Chiefs quarterback Patrick Mahomes tweeted Weber's famous "Who do you think you are? I am!" quote. Weber has been a fan of the Chiefs ever since his favorite team, the Rams, moved from St. Louis back to Los Angeles.

In 2017, Pete was inducted into the St. Louis Sports Hall of Fame. In 2024, Pete was given a Star on the St. Louis Walk of Fame.

Since 2024, the PBA has held a tournament named after Weber: the Pete Weber Missouri Classic.

== Weber's career PBA Tour titles ==
=== PBA Tour Titles ===
Major championships are in bold text.

1. 1982 Greater Hartford Open, Windsor Locks, Conn.
2. 1982 City of Roses Open, Portland, Ore.
3. 1984 Aqua Fest Mr. Gatti's Open, Austin, Texas.
4. 1984 Molson Golden Bowling Challenge, Ontario, Canada.
5. 1985 Showboat Invitational, Las Vegas, Nev.
6. 1985 Lite Beer Classic, Miami, Fla.
7. 1985 Budweiser Open, Taylor, Mich.
8. 1986 St. Louis Open, St. Louis, Mo.
9. 1986 Japan Cup, Tokyo, Japan.
10. **1987 Tournament of Champions**, Akron, Ohio.
11. **1988 U.S. Open**, Atlantic City, N.J.
12. **1989 PBA National Championship**, Toledo, Ohio.
13. 1989 Kessler Open, Dublin, Calif.
14. 1990 La Mode Classic, Green Bay, Wis.
15. 1990 Toyota Classic, St. Louis, Mo.
16. 1991 Fair Lanes Open, Baltimore, Md.
17. 1991 Johnny Petraglia Open, N. Brunswick, N.J.
18. **1991 U.S. Open**, Indianapolis, Ind.
19. **1992 Touring Players Championship**, Indianapolis, Ind.
20. 1993 IOF Foresters Bowling for Miracles Open, Ontario, Canada.
21. 1993 Oronamin C Japan Cup, Tokyo, Japan.
22. 1997 Tucson Open, Tucson, Ariz.
23. 1997 Comfort Inn Classic, Tampa, Fla.
24. **1998 PBA National Championship**, Toledo, Ohio.
25. 2000 Parker Bohn III Empire State Open, Latham, N.Y.
26. 2001-02 PBA Great Lakes Classic, Grand Rapids, Mich.
27. 2001-02 PBA Greater Louisville Open, Louisville, Ky.
28. 2001-02 PBA Columbia 300 Tar Heel Open, Burlington, N.C.
29. 2002-03 PBA Tar Heel Open, Burlington, N.C.
30. 2003-04 PBA Medford Open, Medford, Ore.
31. **2003-04 U.S. Open**, Fountain Valley, Calif.
32. 2005-06 BowlersParadise.com Classic, Hammond, Ind.
33. 2006-07 Etonic Championship, Cheektowaga, N.Y.
34. **2006-07 U.S. Open**, North Brunswick, N.J.
35. 2009-10 Lumber Liquidators Marathon Open, Baltimore, MD.
36. **2011-12 U.S. Open**, North Brunswick, N.J.
37. **2012-13 Tournament of Champions**, Indianapolis, IN.

=== PBA50 Tour Titles ===
1. **2013 USBC Senior Masters**, Las Vegas, NV.
2. 2013 PBA50 Treasure Island Resort & Casino Open, Welch, Minn.
3. 2014 PBA50 Pro Bowl West Fort Wayne Classic, Fort Wayne, Ind.
4. **2015 Senior U.S. Open**, Las Vegas, NV.
5. 2016 PBA50 UnitedHealthcare Sun Bowl In The Villages, The Villages, Fla.
6. 2016 PBA50 Mooresville Ford Open, Mooresville, N.C.
7. 2016 PBA50 Johnny Petraglia BVL Open, Farmingdale, N.Y.
8. **2016 Senior U.S. Open**, Las Vegas, NV.
9. **2016 USBC Senior Masters**, Las Vegas, NV.
10. 2016 PBA50 South Shore Open, Hammond, Ind.
11. 2017 PBA50 DeHayes Insurance Group Championship, Fort Wayne, Ind.
12. **2021 PBA50 National Championship**, The Villages, Fla.
13. 2021 PBA50 Granville Financial Open, Aberdeen, N.C.
14. **2023 Bud Moore PBA50 Players Championship**, Sterling, VA.

=== PBA60 Tour Titles ===
1. 2026 PBA60 WSOB Roth Championship, Columbus, OH.
