= John Handegard =

American ten-pin bowler (1938–2025)

John Louis Handegard (May 18, 1938 – October 24, 2025) was an American professional ten-pin bowler who spent time on both the PBA Tour and the PBA Senior Tour (now PBA50 Tour). For over two decades, he ranked as the all-time leader in PBA50 Tour titles with 14, until being surpassed by Walter Ray Williams Jr. in 2021. Handegard was a three-time PBA Senior Player of the Year (1991, 1995 and 1996). On January 24, 2009, Handegard became the first inductee into the newly launched PBA Senior Hall of Fame. He was also a 2010 inductee to the USBC Hall of Fame in the Veterans category, and a 2019 inductee to the Oregon Bowling Hall of Fame.

Handegard made PBA history at the 1995 Northwest Classic, when he defeated future PBA Hall of Famers Mike Aulby and Norm Duke on the way to besting another PBA Hall of Famer, Mark Williams, in the championship match by a 278–247 score. This made Handegard the oldest player (57 years, 55 days) to ever win a regular PBA Tour event. That eclipsed the 30-year-old mark set by Buzz Fazio, who won a December 1964 PBA tournament at age 56. For the PBA's 60th anniversary in 2018, Handegard's achievement was recognized as #52 among the PBA's "60 Most Memorable Moments".

Handegard died on October 24, 2025, at the age of 87.
