= Johnny Petraglia =

American professional bowler (born 1947)

Personal information
- Born: John Petraglia; March 3, 1947 (age 79) Brooklyn, New York, U.S.
- Years active: 1965−1966, 1969−present
- Height: 180 cm (5 ft 11 in)

Bowling Information
- Country: United States
- Sport: Ten-pin bowling
- League: PBA
- Turned pro: 1965
- Dominant hand: Left
- Sponsors: Brunswick

Achievements and titles
- National finals: 14 PBA Tour (3 majors); 8 PBA50 Tour

John Petraglia Sr. (/pətræɡliə/) (born March 3, 1947) is a left-handed American professional bowler. He is a member of the Professional Bowlers Association (PBA), where he won 14 PBA Tour titles. He has also won eight PBA Senior Tour titles. He is a member of both the PBA and USBC Halls of Fame.

== Bowling career ==
Petraglia joined the PBA in 1965, and won his first tour title at Fort Smith, Arkansas in 1966 when he was just 19 years old. A week later, Petraglia left the PBA Tour to join the United States Army during the Vietnam War. He served as an Army Specialist 5 in Long Binh and Bien Hoa from 1967 to 1968.

His best season as a pro came in 1971, when he won five titles in all. That year included consecutive wins in the last three tournaments of the winter season—culminated by a major championship in the Firestone Tournament of Champions. Petraglia remains the only PBA bowler to win three consecutive televised tournaments. Petraglia would win two more majors: the 1977 BPAA U.S. Open and 1980 PBA National Championship, making him at the time only the second player to earn the PBA career "triple crown", following Billy Hardwick. Since then, seven other players (Mike Aulby, Pete Weber, Norm Duke, Chris Barnes, Jason Belmonte, Dom Barrett and E. J. Tackett) have also achieved the triple crown. The 1980 event featured one of the more dramatic final matches in major tournament history, as Petraglia rolled four consecutive strikes in the 9th and 10th frames to secure the victory over Gary Dickinson.

At the 1994 PBA National Championship, the 47-year-old Petraglia rolled the PBA's seventh televised perfect 300 game to defeat Walter Ray Williams Jr., 300–194, in the semifinal match. He did not, however, go on to win the title match that followed. Through 2026, Petraglia is the oldest player to score 300 in a televised PBA Tour event.

Petraglia is one of only two bowlers (joining Dick Weber) to win at least one regular or Senior PBA Tour title in six different decades. However, Weber's final title was in a PBA Regional event. After his victory in the PBA Senior Dayton Classic on May 17, 2012, Petraglia became the first bowler in history to win a national PBA Tour title in six different decades.

In 2010, Petraglia won the Dick Weber Bowling Ambassador Award, an honor given annually by the Bowling Proprietors Association of America (BPAA) to the "bowling athlete who has consistently shown grace on and off the lanes by promoting the sport of bowling in a positive manner."

In the qualifying rounds of the 2018 PBA Tournament of Champions, Petraglia announced his retirement from the PBA Tour. However, he is still a brand ambassador for Brunswick and occasionally competes in the PBA50 Tour (formerly PBA Senior Tour).

=== PBA Tour titles ===
Major championships in bold type.

1. 1966 Fort Smith Open (Fort Smith, Arkansas)
2. 1970 Bellows-Valvair Open (Pittsburgh, Pennsylvania)
3. 1971 Winston-Salem Classic (Winston-Salem, North Carolina)
4. 1971 Fair Lanes Open (Springfield, Virginia)
5. 1971 Don Carter Classic (New Orleans, Louisiana)
6. **1971 Firestone Tournament of Champions** (Akron, Ohio)
7. 1971 Houston-Sertoma Open (Houston, Texas)
8. 1972 Bellows-Valvair Open (Painesville, Ohio)
9. 1974 Brunswick World Open (Glendale Heights, Illinois)
10. **1977 BPAA U.S. Open** (Greensboro, North Carolina)
11. 1978 Long Island Open (Garden City, New York)
12. 1979 Miller High Life Open (Milwaukee, Wisconsin)
13. 1979 Midas Golden Challenge (Palatine, Illinois)
14. **1980 PBA National Championship** (Sterling Heights, Michigan)

== Personal ==
Born in Brooklyn, New York, he now hails from Jackson Township, New Jersey. Starting in 1980, Petraglia had been a resident of Manalapan Township, New Jersey for more than three decades.

A veteran of the Vietnam War, Petraglia is an official spokesperson for the Bowlers to Veterans Link (BVL) charity. In 2023, he was awarded the PBA's Tony Reyes Community Service Award for his continued work with BVL.

== In the media ==
In a sport where most bowlers frequently change equipment affiliations, Petraglia has remained associated with Brunswick Corporation since 1971. Numerous Brunswick bowling balls and other products have borne his name over the years, including the popular "Johnny Petraglia LT-48" ball from the late 1970s and 1980s that was brought back in a reactive form in recent years. There was also a recent PBA Tour stop named after him—The Johnny Petraglia Open in North Brunswick, NJ.

== Awards and recognition ==
- Inducted into the PBA Hall of Fame in 1982
- Inducted into USBC Hall of Fame in May 2009
- Served three terms as PBA President (1979–80, 1989–90 and 1997–98)
- Was ranked #16 on the PBA's 2008 list of "50 Greatest Players of the Last 50 Years"
- One of nine players in history to earn the PBA career Triple Crown
- Only player to win three consecutive televised PBA Tour events (1971)
- Oldest player to roll a nationally televised 300 game in a PBA Tour event (1994, age 47)
- 2010 BPAA Dick Weber Bowling Ambassador Award winner
- 2023 PBA Tony Reyes Community Service Award winner

== Oil Pattern ==
The PBA introduced an oil pattern, "The Johnny Petraglia 46" named after the bowler. The pattern is 46 feet (14 meters) in length.
