= 1964 PBA Tour season =

PBA Bowling Tour: 1964 Season
- League: Professional Bowlers Association
- Sport: Ten-pin bowling
- Duration: December 12, 1963 – November 14, 1964

PBA Tour
- Season MVP: Bob Strampe

PBA Tour seasons
- ← 1963 1965 →

This is a recap of the 1964 season for the Professional Bowlers Association (PBA) Tour. It was the tour's sixth season, and consisted of 31 events. Bob Strampe's lone victory on the year was at the fifth PBA National Championship, but he also led the Tour in earnings to win the Sporting News PBA Player of the Year award.

== Tournament schedule ==
Event	Bowling center	City	Dates	Winner
Jacksonville PBA Open	Colt Lanes	Jacksonville, Florida	Dec 12–16	Carmen Salvino (4)
Hialeah PBA Open	Hialeah Lanes	Hialeah, Florida	Dec 19–23	Johnny King (1)
St. Louis PBA Open	Crestwood Bowl	St. Louis, Missouri	Jan 7–11	Andy Marzich (5)
Mobile Sertoma PBA Open	Florida Bowl	Mobile, Alabama	Feb 11–15	Bill Allen (4)
New Orleans Coca-Cola PBA Open	Expressway Lanes	Gretna, Louisiana	Feb 18–22	Bill Allen (5)
Birmingham Coca-Cola PBA Open	Homewood Bowl	Birmingham, Alabama	Feb 25–29	Billy Hardwick (5)
Colt PBA Open	Unitas Lanes	Glen Burnie, Maryland	Mar 3–7	Tommy Tuttle (1)
New Jersey BPA Cavalcade	Princeton Bowl	Princeton, New Jersey	Mar 10–14	Buzz Fazio (1)
Buffalo PBA Open	Fairlanes	Depew, New York	Mar 17–21	Wayne Zahn (2)
North American Van Lines Open	300 Bowl	Pontiac, Michigan	Mar 24–28	Billy Hardwick (6)
Denver PBA Open	Celebrity Lanes	Denver, Colorado	Mar 31 – Apr 4	Don Johnson (1)
Southern California PBA Open	Kona Lanes	Costa Mesa, California	Apr 7–11	Billy Hardwick (7)
North California PBA Open	Tokay Bowl	Lodi, California	Apr 14–18	Wayne Zahn (3)
San Jose PBA Open	Saratoga Lanes	San Jose, California	Jun 11–14	Bill Allen (6)
Seattle Coca-Cola PBA Open	Skyway Park Bowl	Seattle, Washington	Jun 18–21	Jerry McCoy (1)
Spokane PBA Open	Silver Lanes	Spokane, Washington	Jun 25–28	Ray Bluth (1)
Rockford Coca-Cola PBA Open	Park Lanes	Rockford, Illinois	Jul 15–18	Carmen Salvino (5)
Pittsburg PBA Open	Baden Bowl	Baden, Pennsylvania	Jul 23–26	Harry Smith (6)
Continental PBA Open	Continental Lanes	Roseville, Michigan	Jul 30 – Aug 2	Jim St. John (4)
Third Annual Canadian PBA Open	Laurentian Lanes	Montreal, Quebec	Aug 6–9	Bill Allen (7)
Bertrand PBA Open	Bertrand Bowl	Waukegan, Illinois	Aug 13–16	Pete Tountas (1)
Louisville Coca-Cola PBA Open	Thelmal Lanes	Louisville, Kentucky	Aug 20–23	Nelson Burton Jr. (1)
Houston Coca-Cola Open	Post Oak Lanes	Houston, Texas	Aug 27–30	Les Schissler (2)
Dallas Home Furniture Open	Hart Bowl	Dallas, Texas	Sep 4–7	Dick Weber (13)
Tucson PBA Open	Cactus Bowl	Tucson, Arizona	Sep 10–13	Glenn Allison (4)
Mesa-Phoenix Open	Country Club Bowl	Mesa, Arizona	Sep 17–20	Billy Welu (2)
Oxnard PBA Open	Tournament Bowl	Oxnard, California	Sep 24–27	Glenn Allison (5)
San Diego PBA Open	University Lanes	San Diego, California	Oct 1–4	Andy Marzich (6)
Las Vegas PBA Open	Showboat Lanes	Las Vegas, Nevada	Oct 6–10	Harry Smith (7)
Fifth Annual PBA National Championship	Garden City Bowl	Garden City, New York	Nov 3–8	Bob Strampe (1)
Columbus Pepsi Cola PBA Open	Amos Lanes	Columbus, Ohio	Nov 11–14	Billy Golembiewski (2)
