= Buzz Fazio =

American bowler (1908–1993)

- Born: February 7, 1908; Aultman, Ohio, U.S.
- Died: February 15, 1993 (aged 85)
- Other name: Basil "Buzz" Fazio
- Occupation: bowler

Basil "Buzz" Fazio (February 7, 1908 – February 15, 1993) nicknamed the "Buzzer" was a pioneer and early American bowling star during the mid-20th century. Known equally for his fierce competitiveness and audience pleasing theatrics, Fazio's professional career spanned from the early 1940s to the late 1960s. The six-time ABC (American Bowling Congress) and two-time PBA (Professional Bowlers Association) champion began his career during bowling's golden era of "Team" play.

== Early career ==
Born in Aultman, Ohio, near Akron, Fazio was brought to Detroit in 1947 to join the fabled Stroh's Beer bowling team. The diminutive Fazio, who stood 5’ 6" and weighed about 140 pounds, captained Stroh's for nine seasons and continued the team's tradition for success started by his predecessor and fellow Hall-of-Famer Joe Norris.

During the 1950s, the Fazio led Stroh's Beer squad, featuring Lee Jouglard, Tom Hennessy, Pete Carter, Tony Lindemann, and Ed Lubanski, captured numerous tournaments including the BPAA Team Championships in 1952, 1953 and 1954. Fazio also teamed up with Stroh's teammate Tony Lindemann to win the BPAA Doubles Championship three times (1951, 1952 and 1954).

Before the formation of the PBA in 1958, Fazio and his contemporaries competed on TV shows like Make That Spare, Bowling for Dollars and Championship Bowling, the latter of which was hosted by Detroit legend Fred Wolf. Among the many bowling highlights in his career, Fazio was the first to roll an 800 series on live TV (802), and was the first-ever to roll a 300 game in the finals of the BPAA All-Star (predecessor to the U.S. Open). He also won seven consecutive televised matches in Chicago in 1955.

In 1955, at age 47, Fazio won the ABC Masters Singles Championship. Incredibly, he converted two 7-10 splits on his way to that victory. He nearly duplicated his Masters championship 13 years later in 1968 when, at age 60, he was runner-up to Pete Tountas.

In 1957, Fazio left the Stroh's team and moved to St. Louis to become captain of the restructured Falstaff Beer team.

== PBA Tour ==
During the 1958 ABC Tournament held in Syracuse, NY, Fazio attended a meeting at the Hotel Syracuse. Sixty men including Don Carter, Frank Esposito, Dick Weber, Carmen Salvino, Billy Welu, Steve Nagy, Harry Smith, Ray Bluth, Dick Hoover, Glenn Allison and Junie McMahon attended. They were there to listen to an Akron attorney and sports agent named Eddie Elias speak about starting a professional bowlers tour. After listening to his proposal, thirty-three of the men, including the “Buzzer” each contributed $50 to start the organization and the PBA was formed.

Fazio captured a pair of PBA titles, both in 1964. His win in Sacramento, California in December 1964, at the age of 56, made him at the time the oldest man to capture a PBA Tour championship. That record stood until 1995, when PBA star John Handegard eclipsed the mark by winning the PBA Northwest Classic at age 57 years, 55 days.

== Awards ==
Fazio's bowling accomplishments earned him enshrinement in both the ABC and PBA Halls-of-Fame. A five-time All-American, in 1999 he was ranked #31 bowler of the 20th Century by Bowlers Journal. In 2020, after great-grandson, Andrew Fazio, rolled 300, the Fazio family became the second family ever to have sanctioned perfect games through four generations. (Buzz-Joseph-Brian-Andrew Fazio)

== Retirement ==
After retiring from competition, Fazio continued to represent the Brunswick Corporation as he had for many years as a player. He hosted the PBA Buzz Fazio Open in Battle Creek, MI and in 1973, served as PBA President.

Though slowed by injuries related to an auto accident and subsequent surgeries, Fazio remained involved in the bowling community during retirement. He often participated in local bowling leagues and served as coach and instructor throughout the 1980s and until his death at age 85 in 1993.
