= National Bowling League =

The National Bowling League (NBL) is a defunct professional bowling league in the United States that existed from February 24, 1960 to July 9, 1962. The league was formed as an attempt to ride the popularity of bowling television shows, and also to challenge the Professional Bowlers Association (PBA).

The league was the brainchild of Leonard "Len" Homel, who thought up the idea in 1959, but did not gain support until an article by Don Snyder in the January 1960 issue of Bowlers Journal. Unlike the PBA, bowlers in the NBL were members of teams that competed against squads from other cities, like the successful National Football League (NFL). A 135-match schedule was planned, five games a week, leading to a "World Series of Bowling".

Only a single season of play was held. The season began in October 1961 with 10 teams, but failed to attract fans, and four of the teams folded in the first three months. A "World Series" was held in May 1962 that attracted about 1,000 spectators, and the league was declared defunct two months later.

== League setup and home arenas ==
The NBL was officially founded on February 24–25, 1960, in Chicago. Initially, the league awarded "charter franchises" to Los Angeles, Fort Worth, San Antonio, Dallas, Chicago, Omaha and Raleigh, N.C., as well as "provisional franchises" to Fresno, Calif., Miami, New York, Cleveland and Houston. In a meeting in Dallas in May 1960, several other cities made presentations to join the league, including Detroit, San Francisco, St. Louis, Minneapolis-St. Paul, Atlanta and Salt Lake City. Several other cities (including Denver, Boston, Birmingham, Tucson/Phoenix and San Diego) were awarded 30-day options on franchises, with an eye to make the NBL a sixteen-team loop.

Ultimately, when the NBL began play in the fall of 1961, it featured ten teams in two divisions:

Eastern Division	Home arena	City
Detroit Thunderbirds	Thunder Bowl	Allen Park, Michigan
Kansas City Stars	Midland Theatre	Kansas City, Missouri
New York Gladiators	Gladiator Arena	Totowa, New Jersey
Omaha Packers	Packer Stadium	Omaha, Nebraska
Twin Cities Skippers	Convention Center Arena	Bloomington, Minnesota
Western Division	Home arena	City
Dallas Broncos	Bronco Bowl	Dallas, Texas
Fort Worth Panthers	Panther Hall	Fort Worth, Texas
Fresno Bombers	NBL Lanes	Clovis, California
Los Angeles Toros	Jefferson Arena	Culver City, California
San Antonio Cavaliers	no home arena	road team

The minimum salary was $6,000, with some such as Buzz Fazio making upwards of $20,000, a payday that rivaled many top PBA bowlers; the entire league payroll set at $800,000.

For his part, PBA secretary Ed Elias did not consider the NBL a threat to his organization:

"At no time has the PBA ever opposed the idea of a National Bowling League. Having struggled through our early formative days, we knew full well the many problems that could arise for any such new organization. However, we were quick to welcome the idea of additional employment for the man who makes his living bowling. The National Bowling League offered just that, and if it had succeeded as originally planned, it would have meant additional income, prestige and recognition for the bowler himself, and added recognition for the bowling industry — something we are all seeking continually."

== First draft ==
On July 17, 1960 the NBL held its first draft, selecting Billy Welu first (Miami), and Don Carter second (Fort Worth). Later rounds selected major league baseball stars Mickey Mantle and Yogi Berra, who were both bowling alley owners. On September 5, 1960 Fred Riccillii became the first player to sign. The first name player to sign was Steve Nagy. Others included Buzz Fazio, Ed Lubanski, Billy Golembiewski, Joe Joseph, and Bob Hitt. Don Carter, probably the best-known bowler in the country at the time and already sponsored by Budweiser, turned down a $1,000 per week contract, half-interest in a goat farm, and a cut of the gate.

== Arenas and the lack of a TV contract ==
Bowling was popular on television at the time; NBC carried "Championship Bowling", while other local and national programs included "Make That Spare", "Bowling for Dollars", and "Celebrity Bowling." The NBL tried to place its matches on ABC, but that network also chose the PBA. (ABC televised PBA matches on the Saturday afternoon "Pro Bowlers Tour" from 1961–97; the program later aired on CBS and is now seen on FS1.)

Without a television contract, the NBL had to rely on a strong gate. Using mostly smaller arenas and converted theaters (Dallas and Detroit were the only teams that played in actual bowling alleys), the league created "arena style bowling", using four to six lanes with bleachers that held anywhere from 1,150 to 3,250 people; this setup is now used today in the PBA. Some had spotlighted lanes, scoreboards, semicircular-pattern seats, a press box, concessions stands, and dressing rooms. Kansas City's Midland and Omaha's Paramount were famous movie theaters that were transformed into NBL arenas.

== Rules ==
There were two ways a player could earn points for his team: by winning his individual match (worth one point) and by making "bonus" points. A 210 score earned one bonus point, a 220 game two points, and so on, up to ten bonus points for a perfect 300 game. Matches were divided into two halves, with five players (leadoff, pressure, pivot, cleanup and anchor) from each team pitted against each other. The first half was played on a team-rotation basis, with opposing players competing on a head-to-head basis (leadoff vs. leadoff, etc.). The second half pitted player against player, each bowler bowling one complete game before his teammate bowls.

The NBL also featured a wild-card substitution rule. When a bowler was faced with a difficult shot, his captain could call in a specialist to roll for him. (The most common wild-card substitution was calling in a left-hander for a right-hander when a couple of pins on the right side of the alley needed to be knocked down for a critical spare.)

== The NBL's first match ==
The NBL's first match was New York at Dallas on October 12, 1961. The Dallas Broncos owner was oilman J. Curtis Sanford, who had come up with the idea of football's Cotton Bowl in 1937. He poured millions into his team, building the Bronco Bowl, a 72-lane alley that was one of the largest bowling centers in the country at the time. The Broncos' home matches were located in a special section that featured six lanes and 18 rows of seats in a semicircle; there was even a seven-piece jazz band to entertain between games. Dallas won their opener 22-2, but the Broncos drew just 2,000 fans on opening night, well short of a sellout, and attendance got worse from there. (The lanes were eventually removed from the Bronco Bowl and it became a popular music venue for rock and roll acts including A-ha, Bob Dylan, U2, and Bruce Springsteen before closing in 2003.)

Other teams also got off to less-than-promising starts. Jesse Weingart, a co-owner of the original New York team, had his franchise rights terminated in April 1961, and he threatened to sue the league. The new owners, unable to find a home on top of Grand Central Station, wound up remodeling a movie theater in distant Totowa, New Jersey, about 20 miles from Manhattan; the Gladiators home opener on October 17 drew just 600 fans. Meanwhile, the Los Angeles Toros built a new facility, Jefferson Street Arena, which could hold only 1,200 fans; even on opening night, they couldn't sell it out, drawing only 950 fans in a 22-9 loss to Fresno. And when the San Antonio Cavaliers' top investor backed out, they wound up rolling all their matches on the road; their planned home (the Aztec Theatre) seated only 1,477, and was considered to be too small even for temporary use—even though the capacity was larger than any of the NBL teams would draw on average in 1961-62.

== The NBL fails ==
The Omaha and San Antonio franchises each folded on December 17, 1961, while Kansas City dropped out six days later. When the LA Toros gave up the ghost on January 15, 1962, the league dropped the divisional setup and declared Detroit the "first half" champion; the league started the "second half" with the remaining six teams starting January 28. Fan interest remained low; even in Detroit, who led the NBL in attendance, the Thunderbirds actually rolled a late-season match behind closed doors, rather than distribute free tickets.

Twin Cities claimed the second-half title and faced Detroit in the best-of-five "NBL World Series" on May 4–6, 1962 in Allen Park, Michigan. The Thunderbirds swept the Skippers in three straight matches (winning the finale, 27-15 in front of about 1,000 spectators), and claimed the only National Bowling League title. Don Bickford of Dallas finished with the best average score at 220.45, edging out Broncos teammate J. B. Solomon at 220.30; Dallas also had the highest average team score with 217.19.

On May 9, 1962, acting commissioner Edward Tobolowski announced the NBL would return in 1963, later proposing a shortened 16-week season beginning in January. After suffering stiff financial losses, however, the league also wanted to eliminate player salaries and have bowlers roll for prize money (reportedly as much as $250,000) instead. NBL bowlers were unsurprisingly not fond of this idea; Ed Lubanski, captain of the champion Thunderbirds, said he believed most league players would return to the PBA even if the NBL returned. On July 9, 1962, Tobolowski officially announced the end of the NBL.

The book Let's Go Bowling! claimed that "most bowlers hesitated to give up their status as part of the PBA to join (the NBL)."

== Final standings ==
=== First half ===
Teams marked with (*) did not finish season.

Team	W	L	Pct	GB
Detroit	40	24	.625	--
Fresno	36	24	.600	2
Twin Cities	38	26	.594	2
Dallas	37	29	.561	4
Fort Worth	29	33	.468	10
New York	28	40	.412	14
Omaha*	22	20	.524	
Kansas City*	17	25	.405	
Los Angeles*	19	29	.396	
San Antonio*	9	29	.237	

=== Second half ===
Team	W	L	Pct	GB
Twin Cities	26	7	.788	--
Detroit	19	14	.576	7
Dallas	15	17	.469	10.5
New York	14	19	.424	12
Fort Worth	13	19	.406	12.5
Fresno	11	22	.333	15

=== Overall ===
Team	W	L	GP
Twin Cities Skippers x	64	33	97
Detroit Thunderbirds x	59	38	97
Dallas Broncos	52	46	98
Fresno Bombers	47	46	93
Fort Worth Panthers	42	52	94
New York Gladiators	42	59	101
Omaha Packers*	22	20	42
Los Angeles Toros*	19	29	48
Kansas City Stars*	17	25	42
San Antonio Cavaliers*	9	29	38

- x - Advanced to NBL World Series
- * - Folded mid-season
