= Andrew Anderson (bowler) =

Right-handed American ten-pin bowler (born 1995)

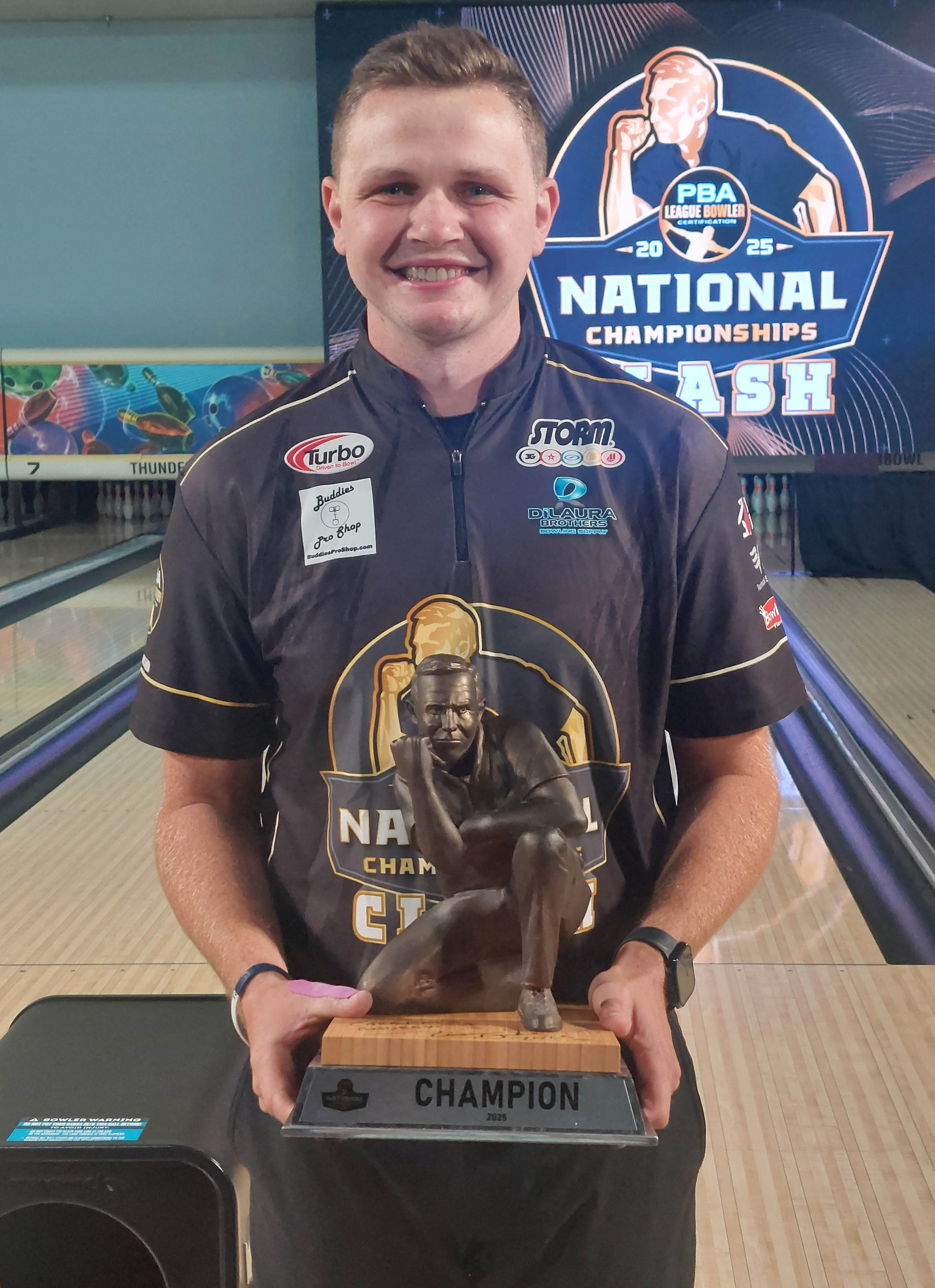
- Andrew Anderson at the 2025 PBA LBC National Champions Clash

Personal information
- Born: May 10, 1995 (age 31) Holly, Michigan, United States
- Height: 188 cm (6 ft 2 in)

Bowling Information
- Affiliation: PBA
- Rookie year: 2017
- Dominant hand: Right (tweener delivery)
- Wins: 6 PBA Tour (1 major); 2 PBA Regional Tour
- 300-games: multiple
- Sponsors: 900 Global, Turbo Grips, Dexter shoes, H5G

Medal record

Men's bowling

Representing United States

World Bowling Championships
Gold medal – first place	2018 Hong Kong	Trios
Silver medal – second place	2018 Hong Kong	Doubles
Silver medal – second place	2018 Hong Kong	Team
Silver medal – second place	2018 Hong Kong	All-Events
Bronze medal – third place	2018 Hong Kong	Singles

IBF Super World Championships
Gold medal – first place	2021 Dubai	Trios

Andrew Anderson (born May 10, 1995) of Holly, Michigan is a right-handed American professional ten-pin bowler known for winning the 2018 USBC Masters. He competes in events on the PBA Tour, and also bowls in global events as a multi-year and current member of Team USA. In his second full season on the PBA Tour (2018), Anderson won the Chris Schenkel PBA Player of the Year Award.

Anderson has won six PBA Tour titles, including one major championship. He is a member of the Turbo grips pro staff and is also sponsored by Dexter shoes and High 5 Gear sportswear. He was a pro staff member for Ebonite, moving to Brunswick after the latter purchased the former in 2019. In 2022, Anderson became a MOTIV Bowling pro staffer, remaining with that company through the 2024 season. In December 2024, Anderson signed with 900 Global.

== Amateur career ==
Anderson bowled collegiately at Davenport University in Grand Rapids, Michigan where he earned 2014 Collegiate Rookie of the Year honors. He completed a Bachelor's degree in elementary education at Oakland University in Rochester Hills, Michigan. He was a three-time member of Junior Team USA, and is a seven-time member of Team USA (2018–2019, 2021, 2023–2026).

As a member of Junior Team USA, Anderson won seven gold medals at the 2013 Tournament of the Americas, and another five gold medals at the 2014 Tournament of the Americas.

At the 2018 World Bowling Tour Men's Championships in Hong Kong (held November 24–December 5), Anderson won a gold medal in trios with teammates Kyle Troup and E. J. Tackett. He also won silver medals in doubles, team and all-events while taking home a bronze medal in singles.

Anderson was part of the rotating four-person team (with A. J. Johnson, Jakob Butturff and Kristopher Prather) that won the trios gold medal for Team USA at the 2021 International Bowling Federation (IBF) Super World Championships in Dubai.

== Professional career ==
Anderson won one PBA Regional Tour title as a non-member. He became a full-time PBA Tour bowler in 2017, participating in 16 national tour events and making one championship round, where he finished third. He also won another PBA Regional Tour title in 2017, his first as a PBA member.

=== 2018: major title and Player of the Year ===
In February 2018, Anderson qualified as the #2 seed for the PBA Tournament of Champions, but was defeated in the semifinal match (his first television appearance) by the eventual winner, Matt O'Grady.

He then qualified as the #1 seed (out of 360 players) at the 2018 USBC Masters, and won his lone match in the televised finals on April 15 to earn his first national PBA Tour title and first major championship. Anderson won his second PBA Tour title on June 3, 2018 at the PBA Greater Jonesboro Open. In October 2018, he finished runner-up in two of the three FloBowling PBA Fall Swing events: the PBA Wolf Open and the PBA Tulsa Open.

On November 20, 2018, the PBA announced that Anderson won the 2018 Chris Schenkel PBA Player of the Year award. At 23, Anderson is the second-youngest player in history to win the award, behind Billy Hardwick who won the 1963 POY award at age 22. In addition to his two season titles and three other top-five finishes, Anderson won the Harry Smith PBA Points Leader award while ranking in the top five in tour earnings and scoring average.

=== 2019–2020 ===
Anderson took a step back in 2019, in part due to a hand injury he suffered in Hong Kong at the end of 2018. He mentioned on the 2019 PBA Tour Finals broadcast (July 19) that the hand bothered him for several months, forcing him to alter his delivery. He made just three final round appearances in 2019 and did not win a title.

His struggles continued into the COVID-shortened 2020 season, as he cashed only four times in 13 events.

=== 2021: doubles success ===
On March 14, 2021, Anderson won his third PBA Tour title (with partner Kris Prather) at the Roth-Holman PBA Doubles Championship. On June 18, 2021 (broadcast July 11), Anderson out-dueled 11 other pros to win the non-title PBA Strike Derby.

=== 2024: second doubles title and PBA League MVP ===
In April 2024, Anderson and partner Kris Prather won their second Roth-Holman doubles championship, giving Anderson his fourth PBA Tour title. In June, Anderson was voted Most Valuable Player of the 2024 PBA Elite League regular season. Over the 14-week season (concurrently held with PBA title events), Anderson captained the Las Vegas High Rollers team and led them to a 10–4 record and the #1 seed for the Elias Cup final rounds in September. He ranked third in total strikes (47) and strike percentage (66.2%) while filling frames (strike or spare) 89.55% of the time. On September 17, 2024, Anderson led the Las Vegas High Rollers to a 3–1 win over the Portland Lumberjacks in the PBA Elite League Championship. He also won the finals MVP award.

=== 2025: two titles, three wins overall ===
In the second event of the 2025 season, Anderson dominated qualifying at the U.S. Open, taking the lead in the second qualifying round and holding the top seed through the end of match play. However, he struggled in the championship match, losing to #2 seed E. J. Tackett, 238–184.

On March 15, 2025, Anderson was the top qualifier for the PBA Mike Aulby Nevada Classic, and he again faced Tackett in the final match. This time Anderson was victorious, 237–181, earning his fifth PBA Tour title and first singles title since 2018.

He finished the 2025 regular season second in Tour points, earning him the #2 seed for the PBA Playoffs. He was upset in the quarterfinals by #7 seed and eventual winner Jesper Svensson.

On June 8, 2025, Anderson won the PBA Tour Finals, a post-season event hosting the top eight points earners over the last two seasons. Anderson defeated Jason Belmonte in his Group 2 stepladder final, two points to one (the players split the two-game final, and Anderson won the 9th/10th frame roll-off, 59–40). He then went on to face Group 1 winner E. J. Tackett. Anderson swept Tackett, two games to none, to earn his sixth PBA Tour title.

In the season's final event, Anderson made the semifinals of the Storm Lucky Larsen Masters, but fell to Finland's Juho Rissanen to finish in a tie for third. He finished the 2025 season with career highs in earnings ($203,781) and average (224.24), both good for third place on Tour. He finished runner-up to E.J. Tackett for the 2025 Chris Schenkel Player of the Year award.

Anderson won the third annual PBA LBC National Champions Clash on September 27, 2025 in Allen Park, Michigan. This was a special non-title event featuring eight bowlers, a mix of male-female, amateur-professional and junior-to-senior, who were part of the PBA's League Bowler Certification (LBC) program and qualified during their division championships. In the seven-round one-ball elimination event, he won $25,000 and The Duke trophy, named after PBA Hall of Famer Norm Duke. After the victory, Anderson remarked on his 2025 season: "I won a trophy with Mike Aulby and Norm Duke's name on it, so I would say that's a pretty special year."

=== 2026 ===
On February 15, 2026, Anderson was named a captain's selection by E. J. Tackett for the USA vs. The World team match on April 4. His best two finishes in a winless 2026 were both in major events: fourth at the U.S. Open and third at the Tournament of Champions.

=== Additional championships ===
In addition to his PBA Tour wins, Anderson won a Singles Eagle (title) at the 2021 USBC Open Championships, firing an 802 three-game series. In 2025, he won his second USBC Open Championships Eagle in all-events, posting a 2,184 total for the singles, doubles and team events (9 games).

== Professional wins ==
=== PBA Tour titles ===
Major championships are in bold text. (Source:)

1. **2018 USBC Masters** (Syracuse, New York)
2. 2018 PBA Greater Jonesboro Open (Jonesboro, Arkansas)
3. 2021 Roth/Holman PBA Doubles Championship w/Kris Prather (Tampa, Florida)
4. 2024 Roth/Holman PBA Doubles Championship w/Kris Prather (Allen Park, Michigan)
5. 2025 PBA Mike Aulby Nevada Classic (Reno, Nevada)
6. 2025 PBA Tour Finals (Bethlehem, Pennsylvania)

=== Non-title victories ===
1. 2021 PBA Strike Derby (Portland, Maine)
2. 2021 USBC Open Championships – Singles (Las Vegas, Nevada)
3. 2024 PBA Elite League champion with Las Vegas High Rollers (regular season & finals MVP) (Portland, Maine)
4. 2025 USBC Open Championships – All-Events (Baton Rouge, Louisiana)
5. 2025 PBA LBC National Champions Clash (Allen Park, Michigan)

== Career statistics ==
Statistics are through the last complete PBA Tour season. Match play and CRA statistics exclude non-title and postseason events, but postseason titles are included.

Season	Events	Cashes	Match Play	CRA+	PBA Tour Titles (majors)	Regional Titles	Average	Earnings (US$)
2015	1	1	1	0	0	0	214.36	0
2016	1	1	0	0	0	0	206.56	1,150
2017	27	10	6	1	0	1	213.96	25,630
2018	29	19	10	5	2 (1)	1	219.81	103,345
2019	28	14	10	3	0	0	211.28	37,365
2020	13	4	1	0	0	0	213.18	25,800
2021	15	9	2	1	1	--	215.04	69,685
2022	13	8	5	1	0	--	212.21	40,375
2023	16	6	6	1	0	--	212.44	34,400
2024	17	9	8	2	1	--	219.05	74,905
2025	18	13	10	4	2	--	224.24	203,781
2026	17	8	4	2	0	--	216.79	69,500
**Totals**	**195**	**102**	**63**	**20**	**6 (1)**	**2**	--	**685,936**

+CRA = Championship Round Appearances

== Awards and honors ==
- 2014 Collegiate Rookie of the Year
- 2018 Chris Schenkel PBA Player of the Year
- 2018 Harry Smith PBA Points Leader Award
- 2024 PBA Elite League Regular Season MVP
- 2024 PBA Elite League Finals MVP

== Personal ==
When not competing on the PBA Tour or internationally, Anderson is an associate coach at Turbo Tech in Chesterfield, Michigan, where he now resides. He has coached Landin Jordan, a former PBA Junior national champion who finished 8th at the 2025 U.S. Open as an 18-year old. Anderson also served two terms on the USBC Board of Directors. He enjoys outdoor activities such as boating, fishing, camping and golfing.

With the 2021 PBA Tour Finals being contested in Allen Park, Michigan, not far from Anderson's home in Holly, Andrew appeared as a laneside reporter for CBS Sports Network during the five hours of live coverage on June 27.
