= 1962 PBA Tour season =

PBA Bowling Tour: 1962 Season
- League: Professional Bowlers Association
- Sport: Ten-pin bowling
- Duration: January 24 – November 8, 1962

PBA Tour
- Season MVP: None selected

PBA Tour seasons
- ← 1961 1963 →

This is a recap of the 1962 season for the Professional Bowlers Association (PBA) Tour. It was the Tour's fourth season. Included in the season's 30 events was the third PBA National Championship (won by Carmen Salvino) and the first-ever PBA Tournament of Champions, which featured all 25 previous PBA Tour champions to date. It was won by Joe Joseph, who had qualified by capturing his first PBA title only four events earlier.

== Tournament schedule ==
Major championships in bold text.

Event	Bowling center	City	Dates	Winner
Fourth Empire State PBA Open	Redwood Lanes	Albany, New York	Jan 24–27	Fred Lening (1)
Philadelphia PBA Open	Boulevard Lanes	Philadelphia, Pennsylvania	Jan 30 – Feb 3	Harry Smith (2)
PBA Colt Open	Colt Lanes of Towson	Baltimore, Maryland	Feb 7–10	Dick Hoover (1)
Akron Coca-Cola PBA Open	North Lanes	Akron, Ohio	Feb 14–17	Glen Blakesley (1)
Cleveland Coca-Cola PBA Open	Eastgate Coliseum	Cleveland, Ohio	Feb 21–24	Skip Vigars (1)
Winston-Salem PBA Open	Expressway Lanes	Winston-Salem, North Carolina	Feb 28 – Mar 03	Al Savas (1)
Birmingham PBA Open	Bowl-A-Mac	Birmingham, Alabama	Mar 7–10	Andy Rogoznica (1)
Memphis PBA Open	Imperial Lanes	Memphis, Tennessee	Mar 14–17	Glenn Allison (1)
Houston PBA Open	McGregor Bowling Centers	Houston, Texas	Mar 21–24	Don Carter (3)
Oak Hills PBA Open	Oak Hills Lanes	San Antonio, Texas	Mar 28–31	Don Bickford (1)
Oklahoma City Coca-Cola Open	Lincoln Lanes	Oklahoma City, Oklahoma	Apr 4–7	Tom Hennessey (2)
St. Louis Coca-Cola Open	Northland Bowl	St. Louis, Missouri	Apr 9–12	Joe Joseph (1)
San Jose PBA Open	Saratoga Lanes	San Jose, California	Apr 18–21	J. B. Solomon (1)
Las Vegas PBA Open	Showboat Lanes	Las Vegas, Nevada	Apr 25–28	Dick Agee (1)
Indianapolis PBA Open	Play Bowl	Indianapolis, Indiana	May 15–18	Billy Welu (1)
**PBA Tournament of Champions**	Play Bowl	Indianapolis, Indiana	May 19–20	Joe Joseph (2)
Canadian PBA Open	Laurentian Lanes	Montreal, Quebec	May 30 – Jun 2	Tom Hennessey (3)
Santa Fair PBA Open	Santa Fair Lanes	Seattle, Washington	Jun 14–17	Don Carter (4)
Silver Lanes PBA Open	Silver Lanes	Spokane, Washington	Jun 21–24	Darylee Cox (1)
Salt Lake PBA Open	Ritz Classic Lanes	Salt Lake City, Utah	Jun 27–30	Glenn Allison (2)
Southern California PBA Open	Ocean Lanes	Long Beach, California	Jul 5–8	Al Savas (2)
Tucson PBA Open	Cactus Lanes	Tucson, Arizona	Jul 12–15	Don Carter (5)
All-American Classic	Cotton Bowl	Dallas, Texas	Jul 19–22	Ray Orf (1)
Twin City PBA Open	Maplewood Bowl	St. Paul, Minnesota	Jul 26–29	Andy Marzich (1)
Chicago PBA Open	The Bowlium	Chicago, Illinois	Aug 9–12	Ed Lubanski (1)
Pontiac PBA Open	300 Bowl	Pontiac, Michigan	Aug 16–19	Carmen Salvino (2)
Niagara Falls PBA Open	Beverly Lanes	Niagara Falls, New York	Aug 23–26	George Howard (2)
Labor Day PBA Classic	The Bowlers Club	Latham, New York	Aug 31 – Sep 3	Dick Downey (1)
Rochester PBA Open	Panorama Bowl	Rochester, New York	Nov 1–4	Don Carter (6)
**Third Annual PBA National Championship**	Boulevard Lanes	Philadelphia, Pennsylvania	Nov 3–8	Carmen Salvino (3)
