= Glenn Allison =

American professional bowler (1930–2025)

Personal information
- Nickname: Mr. 900
- Born: May 22, 1930 Whittier, California, U.S.
- Died: October 7, 2025 (aged 95)
- Years active: 1958-2025
- Height: 5 ft 7 in (170 cm)

Bowling Information
- Affiliation: PBA
- Dominant hand: Right
- Wins: 5 PBA Tour; 1 PBA Senior Tour
- 300-games: 5 (PBA)
- High series: 900 (league, 1982)

Glenn Richard Allison (May 22, 1930 – October 7, 2025) was an American professional ten-pin bowler who was a founding member of the Professional Bowlers Association (PBA). He was born in Whittier, California, to Leo Allison, a car salesman, and Stella Blackford. He won five PBA Tour titles and one PBA Senior Tour title, and was inducted into the PBA Hall of Fame (Veterans/Special Category) in 1984. He is also a member of the USBC Hall of Fame (inducted 1979), having won four titles in the ABC Tournament's Classic Division: he won in doubles in 1962, his Falstaff Beer team won in 1964, he won with the Ace Mitchell Shur-Hooks team in 1966, and he claimed a singles title in 1970. He had ten other top-ten ABC tournament finishes.

== Professional career ==
Allison first made a name for himself as a team bowler of the 1950s, which included his time as a member of the Falstaffs of St. Louis with the likes of Harry Smith, Billy Welu, Dick Hoover, Buzz Fazio, and Steve Nagy. In 1958, he was one of 33 bowlers who each donated $50 to help launch the Professional Bowlers Association after listening to a presentation by attorney and sports agent Eddie Elias.

Prior to the first PBA tournament, in the spring of 1959, Allison rolled games of 249, 243, and 290 on the nationally syndicated Championship Bowling television program. The 782 series was the highest in the long-running history of the TV show.

He won his first PBA title in 1962 and his fifth and final title in 1964. He won his lone PBA Senior Tour title in 1986.

During his PBA years, Allison was sponsored by Brunswick and was a member of their advisory staff.

=== PBA Tour titles ===
1. 1962 PBA Memphis Open (Memphis, TN)
2. 1962 Salt Lake PBA Open (Salt Lake City, UT)
3. 1963 Coca-Cola Tournament of the Stars (Midwest City, OK)
4. 1964 Tucson PBA Open (Tucson, AZ)
5. 1964 Oxnard PBA Open (Oxnard, CA)

=== PBA Senior Tour titles ===
1. 1986 PBA Kessler Senior Championship (Canton, OH)

=== Additional championships ===
1. 1962 ABC Open Championships Classic Doubles (w/Dick Hoover)
2. 1964 ABC Open Championships Classic Team (Falstaff Beer)
3. 1966 ABC Open Championships Classic Team (Ace Mitchell Shur-Hooks)
4. 1970 ABC Open Championships Classic Singles

== 900 series and related controversy ==
Allison became known in bowling circles for being the first American ten-pin bowler to roll a perfect 900 series (three perfect 300 games over a three-game series) in sanctioned competition. He rolled the series on July 1, 1982, in the Anchor Girl Trio League at La Habra Bowl in La Habra, California, but the then-American Bowling Congress (ABC) did not approve his award application, citing non-complying lane conditions. The decision sparked considerable controversy, as the ABC had sanctioned a 299 and 300 at the same bowling center earlier in the season, and no other scores that night were unusually high — even on the pair of lanes on which Allison bowled. But the ABC (now USBC) has never relented and stated in 2014 that it would not retroactively recognize the feat, citing that it would call into question all other rejected honor scores from that era. Allison himself was nonchalant following the most recent USBC decision, stating, "The bowling public recognizes me perhaps more (than) if it was sanctioned," adding that he's still saluted all over the world as the original "Mr. 900".

== Personal life and death ==
Allison was married and divorced three times.

In the 1970s, Allison curtailed his PBA Tour participation and became the proprietor of Glenn Allison Lanes, located in Los Angeles near Los Angeles International Airport. At the time of his 900 series in 1982, he was working as a liquor store manager on Leffingwell Avenue in Whittier.

During the 2011 USBC Open Championships, Allison's 60th appearance, he became one of only 13 bowlers in history to reach a lifetime total of more than 100,000 pins in the event.

In December 2017, Glenn was involved in an automobile accident. In addition to totaling his vehicle, he suffered from a fractured sternum and two fractured vertebrae. The accident occurred on Christmas Eve while Allison was driving to his part-time job as a front desk clerk at La Habra Bowl. His daughter Suzanne said he was recovering at Pomona Valley Hospital and "is determined to heal and get back to bowling."

In his later years, Allison resided in Corona, California and continued participating in national bowling events well into his nineties.

In 2023, at age 92, Allison tied the participation record for the USBC Open Championships, making his 71st lifetime appearance in the event. (He was tied with three other USBC Hall of Famers.) Allison first entered the ABC Open Championships in 1947, and bowled in every annual event from 1954 to 2024. In 2024, at the age of 93, Allison broke the participation record for the USBC Open Championships, making his 72nd lifetime appearance in the event, reaching a lifetime total pinfall of 123,341 (third-highest all-time).

Allison died on the morning of October 7, 2025, at the age of 95. Following his passing, the Professional Bowlers Association (PBA) and the United States Bowling Congress (USBC) issued formal tributes honoring him as a charter member of the PBA, a dual Hall of Famer and an enduring ambassador of the sport who remained universally recognized by fans and peers as the original "Mr. 900".

The Gravesite of Glenn Allison
