= 1960 PBA Tour season =

PBA Bowling Tour: 1960 Season
- League: Professional Bowlers Association
- Sport: Ten-pin bowling
- Duration: May 13 – November 28, 1960

PBA Tour
- Season MVP: None selected

PBA Tour seasons
- ← 1959 1961 →

This is a recap of the 1960 season for the Professional Bowlers Association (PBA) Tour. It was the tour's second season. It consisted of seven events, including the first PBA National Championship, now known as the PBA World Championship. Don Carter won this event among his two titles on the season.

== Tournament schedule ==
Major championships in bold text. The PBA tour's first event of the season, the second annual Empire State PBA open, was held at Schade's Academy, in Albany, New York. The season opened up on May 13, 1960. 28 bowlers cashed in this competition. Dick Weber won the first PBA event of the season, and his third consecutive.

Event	Bowling center	City	Dates	Winner
Empire State PBA Open	Schade's Academy	Albany, New York	May 13–15	Dick Weber (3)
Fairless Hills PBA Open	Fairlanes	Fairless Hills, Pennsylvania	May 17–19	Bill Bunetta (1)
Paramus Eastern PBA Open	Paramus Bowl	Paramus, New Jersey	May 20–22	Don Carter (1)
Las Vegas National PBA Invitational	Showboat Lanes	Las Vegas, Nevada	Jun 20–22	Tom Hennessey (1)
Northern California PBA Open	Castle Lanes	San Francisco, California	Jun 24–26	Earl Johnson (1)
Southern California PBA Open	Bowl-O-Drome	Los Angeles, California	Jul 6 – Sep 1	Morrie Oppenheim (1)
**First Annual National Championship**	Imperial Lanes	Memphis, Tennessee	Nov 25–28	Don Carter (2)

== Leading money winners ==
Name	Earnings ($)	Titles	Top 5	Top 10	Cashes
Don Carter	12,800	2	4	6	6
Harry Smith	7,100	0	3	3	5
Tom Hennessey	7,100	1	2	3	4
Earl Johnson	5,395	1	2	3	6
Bill Bunetta	4,825	1	1	3	5
Dick Weber	4,800	1	1	3	4
Glenn Allison	4,800	0	2	4	5
Morrie Oppenheim	4,145	1	1	1	4
Ronnie Gaudern	3,850	0	1	1	2
Ed Lubanski	3,520	0	2	2	4
