= 1963 PBA Tour season =

PBA Bowling Tour: 1963 Season
- League: Professional Bowlers Association
- Sport: Ten-pin bowling
- Duration: December 5, 1962 – November 17, 1963

PBA Tour
- Season MVP: Billy Hardwick

PBA Tour seasons
- ← 1962 1964 →

This is a recap of the 1963 season for the Professional Bowlers Association (PBA) Tour. It was the tour's fifth season, and consisted of 37 events. 22-year old Billy Hardwick won four titles on the season, including the fourth PBA National Championship, en route to winning the inaugural Sporting News PBA Player of the Year award. Through the 2025 PBA Tour season, Hardwick is still the youngest player to ever win this award.

== Tournament schedule ==
Event	Bowling center	City	Dates	Winner
Atlanta Coca-Cola PBA Open	Eastpoint Triangle Lanes	Atlanta, Georgia	Dec 5–8	Dennis Chapis (1)
Charlotte N.C. PBA Open	North 29 Lanes	Charlotte, North Carolina	Dec 11–14	Billy Golembiewski (1)
Denver Coca-Cola PBA Open	Celebrity Lanes	Denver, Colorado	Jan 9–12	Andy Marzich (2)
Louisville Coca-Cola PBA Open	Ken-Bowl Lanes	Louisville, Kentucky	Jan 30 – Feb 2	Earl Johnson (2)
St. Louis Coca-Cola PBA Open	Crestwood Bowl	St. Louis, Missouri	Feb 6–9	Andy Marzich (3)
Coca-Cola Tournament of Stars	Planet Bowl	Midwest City, Oklahoma	Feb 13–16	Glenn Allison (3)
All American PBA Classic	Cotton Bowl	Dallas, Texas	Feb 20–23	Bill Johnson (1)
Houston Charity Classic	South Park Bowl	Houston, Texas	Feb 27 - Mar 2	Johnny Meyer (1)
Mobile Sertoma PBA Open	Florida Bowl	Mobile, Alabama	Mar 6–9	Billy Hardwick (1)
New Orleans Coca-Cola PBA Open	Expressway Lanes	Gretna, Louisiana	Mar 13–16	J. B. Solomon (2)
Birmingham Coca-Cola PBA Open	Homewood Bowl	Birmingham, Alabama	Mar 20–23	Jack Biondolillo (1)
Tennessee PBA Open	Bowl-Mor Lanes	Kingsport, Tennessee	Mar 26–29	Roger Helle (1)
PBA Indianapolis 500	Raceway Lanes	Indianapolis, Indiana	Apr 3–6	Les Schissler (1)
Pontiac PBA Open	300 Bowl	Pontiac, Michigan	Apr 10–13	Bill Allen (1)
Akron PBA Open	Bowlarama	Akron, Ohio	Apr 16–19	Harry Smith (3)
Boston PBA Open	Atlantic 10 Pin Lanes	Woburn, Massachusetts	Apr 24–27	Andy Marzich (4)
New Jersey PBA Open	Carolier Lanes	North Brunswick, New Jersey	May 1–4	Dick Weber (11)
Baltimore PBA Open	Unitas Colt Lanes	Baltimore, Maryland	Jun 5–8	Lewis Ray (1)
Warren Coca-Cola PBA Open	Rainbow Lanes	Warren, Ohio	Jun 13–16	Marty Piraino (1)
Fifth Empire State PBA Open	Boulevard Lanes	Schenectady, New York	Jun 20–23	Earl Johnson (3)
Canadian PBA Open	Laurentian Lanes	Montreal, Quebec	Jun 27–30	Harry Smith (4)
Chicago Coca-Cola PBA Open	Bowlium Lanes	Chicago, Illinois	Jul 4–7	Wayne Zahn (1)
Rockford Coca-Cola PBA Open	Don Carter Lanes	Rockford, Illinois	Jul 11–14	Jim St. John (1)
Alton PBA Open	Bowl Haven Lanes	Alton, Illinois	Jul 18–21	Vern Downing (2)
Fort Smith PBA Open	Holiday Lanes	Fort Smith, Arkansas	Jul 25–28	Jim St. John (2)
Meridian PBA Open	Playland Bowl	Meridian, Mississippi	Aug 1–4	Jim St. John (3)
San Antonio PBA Open	Oak Hills Lanes	San Antonio, Texas	Aug 8–11	Bill Allen (2)
Tucson PBA Open	Cactus Bowl	Tucson, Arizona	Aug 15–18	Jack Biondolillo (2)
Phoenix PBA Open	Country Club Bowl	Mesa, Arizona	Aug 22–25	Billy Hardwick (2)
San Diego PBA Open	University Lanes	San Diego, California	Aug 29 – Sep 1	Earl Johnson (4)
Los Angeles PBA Open	Rose Lanes	Gardena, California	Sep 5–8	Billy Hardwick (3)
San Jose PBA Open	Saratoga Lanes	San Jose, California	Sep 11–14	George Howard (3)
Portland PBA Open	20th Century Lanes	Portland, Oregon	Sep 19–22	Darylee Cox (2)
Seattle Coca-Cola PBA Open	Skyway Park Bowl	Seattle, Washington	Sep 26–29	Norm Meyers (1)
Spokane PBA Open	Silver Lanes	Spokane, Washington	Oct 3–6	Harry Smith (5)
Salt Lake City PBA Open	Fairmont Lanes	Salt Lake City, Utah	Oct 10–13	Bill Allen (3)
Las Vegas PBA Open	Showboat Lanes	Las Vegas, Nevada	Oct 16–18	Dick Weber (12)
Fourth Annual PBA National Championship	Garden City Bowl	Garden City, New York	Nov 12–17	Billy Hardwick (4)
