= Harry Smith (bowler) =

American ten-pin bowler (1930–2021)

Personal information
- Born: April 29, 1930 Burton, Ohio, U.S.
- Died: August 8, 2021 (aged 91)
- Years active: 1959–1975

Bowling Information
- Affiliation: PBA
- Rookie year: 1959
- Dominant hand: Right
- Wins: 12 PBA Tour (2 majors)
- Sponsors: Brunswick

Harry Monroe Smith (April 29, 1930 – August 8, 2021), nicknamed "Tiger", was a right-handed American ten-pin bowler and charter member of the Professional Bowlers Association (PBA). Smith won 12 PBA Tour titles, including two major championships. He is a member of the PBA and USBC Halls of Fame.

== Early career ==
Smith was known as a standout team bowler in his native Cleveland before moving to Detroit in 1955 to compete for the Pfeiffer Beer team. Two years later, he moved to St. Louis to bowl for the Falstaffs team, which at various times included Glenn Allison, Billy Welu, Buzz Fazio, Steve Nagy and Dick Hoover.

== PBA career ==
Smith was one of 33 men who each donated $50 in 1958 to launch the Professional Bowlers Association (PBA) with sports agent Eddie Elias. Harry competed in the inaugural 1959 season and won his first PBA title in 1961 at the El Paso PBA Open. He would win ten PBA titles, all between 1961 and 1965. Smith also won the 1960 BPAA All-Star (predecessor to the U.S. Open) and 1963 ABC Masters. Due to a PBA rule change in 2008, these events were both retroactively credited as PBA Tour titles and majors if won by a PBA member at the time, giving Smith a revised official total of 12 PBA Tour titles.

1963 was a career year for Smith. He won three standard PBA Tour titles, plus the ABC Masters. He was the subject of a Sports Illustrated article that noted how well-paid professional bowlers were at the time. The November 1963 article stated that Smith had already earned more than the MVPs of the National Football League (Y. A. Tittle) and Major League Baseball's National League (Sandy Koufax) combined. Smith was the PBA Tour's top earner that year with winnings of $30,557, had won an additional $10,000 in non-PBA tournaments (including his ABC Masters win), and was drawing salaries as an advisor for Brunswick and as resident pro for Johnny Unitas' Colt Lanes in Baltimore, all adding up to a yearly income of about $75,000 (about $747,000 in 2023 dollars).

In 1965, Smith won his final three PBA Tour titles over a seven-event span.

Smith curtailed his participation as a full-time bowler in 1971, bowling only a few events per year until fully retiring in 1975. He operated a bowling center in Rochester, New York in the early 1970s, then served as PBA Assistant Tournament Director from 1977 to 1988.

=== PBA Tour titles ===
Major championships are in bold text.

1. **1960 BPAA All-Star** (Omaha, NE)
2. 1961 El Paso PBA Open (El Paso, TX)
3. 1962 Philadelphia PBA Open (Philadelphia, PA)
4. 1963 Akron PBA Open (Akron, OH)
5. **1963 ABC Masters** (Buffalo, NY)
6. 1963 Canadian PBA Open (Montreal, QC)
7. 1963 Spokane PBA Open (Spokane, WA)
8. 1964 Pittsburgh PBA Open (Baden, PA)
9. 1964 Las Vegas PBA Open (Las Vegas, NV)
10. 1965 Venezuelan PBA Open (Caracas, Venezuela)
11. 1965 Tucson Squirt PBA Open (Tucson, AZ)
12. 1965 Denver PBA Open (Denver, CO)

== Bowling style ==
Smith was nicknamed "Tiger" for his fiery attitude and energetic reactions, including frequently "running out" his shots after releasing the ball.

He had an unusual delivery for the era, walking to the left and turning his body sideways, like many power players of today. Long-time PBA Player Services Director and fellow PBA Hall of Famer Larry Lichstein said Smith "was the first power player in our sport. You’d think Mark Roth, but Smitty really was. He would tuck his swing in and that would give him that big heavy hand at the bottom." PBA legend Carmen Salvino, one of Smith's contemporaries, remarked, "Harry looked like he was chasing a fly (ball) going to the foul line. But he could repeat that. If somebody would walk in and see him throwing a ball, they'd want to challenge him – and they'd go home broke!"

== Legacy ==
Smith was inducted into the PBA Hall of Fame with the inaugural 1975 class, and the ABC (now USBC) Hall of Fame in 1978. In addition to his PBA victories, he won four Eagles (titles) in the ABC Open Championships. He made the quarterfinals (top eight) at the ABC Masters five times in addition to his 1963 victory. In a 1973 article, he stated he had bowled 52 perfect 300 games, eleven of them in sanctioned competition.

Smith was ranked #28 in the PBA's 2008 list of "50 Greatest Players of the Last 50 Years". The PBA Tour's annual top points earner is now given the Harry Smith PBA Points Leader Award.

== Personal ==
Smith grew up in Chagrin Falls, Ohio and was a 1949 graduate of Chagrin Falls High School. He worked as a pinboy in his teens and became known locally for hustling people in both bowling and billiards.

== Awards and recognition ==
- 3x Bowlers Journal All-American (1959–60, 1962–63, 1964–65)
- Inducted into PBA Hall of Fame, 1975
- Inducted into USBC Hall of Fame (Performance Category), 1978
- Inducted into the Greater Cleveland Sports Hall of Fame, 1978
- Ranked #28 on the PBA's 2008 list of "50 Greatest Players of the Last 50 Years"
