= Bill Allen (bowler) =

American professional bowler

Personal information
- Born: September 16, 1934 Adairville, Kentucky, U.S.
- Died: March 23, 1992 (aged 57) Atlantic City, New Jersey, U.S.
- Years active: 1961-1975
- Height: 5 ft 11 in (180 cm)

Bowling Information
- Affiliation: PBA
- Rookie year: 1961
- Dominant hand: Left
- Wins: 13 PBA Tour

Bill Allen (March 23, 1934 – September 16, 1992) was an American professional bowler and member of the Professional Bowlers Association. While on tour, Allen won thirteen tournament titles, was a seven-time runner-up, and finished in the top-five an additional seventeen times.

Out of Allen's PBA titles, he won nine of them between 1963 and 1965, with the remaining four won in 1968. In 1964, Bill led the tour in title wins with four, including back-to-back victories at the Mobile Sertoma PBA Open and the New Orleans Coca-Cola PBA Open.

Among his runner-up finishes, Allen's bid to defend his 1964 Mobile-Sertoma PBA Open title in 1965 was stopped by Billy Golembiewski in the championship match. At the 1969 PBA National Championship, Allen finished second to Mike McGrath in total pinfall 13670–13605.

Bill was inducted into the PBA Hall of Fame in 1983 and (posthumously) the United States Bowling Congress Hall of Fame in 2022.

Allen died on March 23, 1992, in Atlantic City during which he was working as a manager at the Showboat Lanes. At the time of his passing, then PBA spokesman Kevin Skippy said, "Bill was one of the premier left-handed bowlers of the '60s. He had phenomenal success during that decade and will be remembered as an honored member of our Hall of Fame.”

During the PBA's 50th season in 2008–09, Allen was named one of the "PBA's 50 Greatest Players of the Last 50 Years" by a panel of bowling experts commissioned by the PBA, ranking at #38, ahead of Mike McGrath and behind Larry Laub.

== PBA Tour titles ==
1. 1963 San Antonio PBA Open (San Antonio, TX)
2. 1963 Pontiac PBA Open (Pontiac, MI)
3. 1963 Salt Lake City PBA Open (Salt Lake City, UT)
4. 1964 Mobile Sertoma PBA Open (Mobile, AL)
5. 1964 New Orleans Coca-Cola PBA Open (New Orleans, LA)
6. 1964 San Jose PBA Open (San Jose, CA)
7. 1964 Third Annual Canadian PBA Open (Montreal, Quebec, Canada)
8. 1965 Fair Lanes PBA Open (Buffalo, NY)
9. 1965 Insurance City PBA Classic (Hartford, CT)
10. 1968 Showboat Invitational (Las Vegas, NV)
11. 1968 San Jose Open (San Jose, CA)
12. 1968 Coast Guard Open (Grand Haven, MI)
13. 1968 Newark Open (Newark, OH)
