= First Annual National Championship =

The First Annual National Championship was the final event of the 1960 PBA Season. It is currently known as the PBA World Championship.

== Format ==
192 bowlers began the tournament. They would bowl 30 games of qualifying. The field was then cut to 12 bowlers who would bowl 30 games of match play. The bowler with the highest 60 game total would win the tournament.

== Tournament Recap ==
The PBA tour's final event of 1960, the $44,000 First Annual National Championship, was held at Imperial Lanes, in Memphis, Tennessee. The first day of PBA competition was November 25, 1960. The competition ran until November 28, 1960. 192 bowlers competed in this event. 48 bowlers cashed in this competition. It took a 208.63 average to make the cut to the finals. Don Carter, of St. Louis, MO, won this major, his second career PBA title, and took home the first prize of $5,600. Don averaged 237.17 for 60 games, beating the 2nd place competitor by 10 pins a game. Rounding out the top 5 were Ronnie Gaudern, Harry Smith, Jack Biondolillo, and Fred Lening.

== Top 10 ==
Position	Name	Hometown	Prize
1	Don Carter	St. Louis, MO	$5,600
2	Ronnie Gaudern	San Antonio, TX	$3,575
3	Harry Smith	Baltimore, MD	$2,500
4	Jack Biondolillo	Houston, TX	$1,955
5	Fred Lening	Fairless Hills, PA	$1,715
6	Billy Welu	St. Louis, MO	$1,590
7	Joe Joseph	Lansing, MI	$1,475
8	Glen Blakesley	Kansas City, MO	$1,425
9	Dick Weber	St. Louis, MO	$1,400
10	JB Solomon	Dallas, TX	$1,270
