= Jane Richardson (author) =

American author

Jane Patch Richardson (December 4, 1919 – November 25, 2018) was an American author.

She was born Jane Patch on December 4, 1919, in Cleveland, Ohio, to Gustave and Martha Patch. Taking up traveling at an early age, Richardson traveled numerous times through the Indian subcontinent. She used her experience guiding tour groups through villages and palaces throughout the country to write four books on India, and was legally adopted into the royal family of Udaipur in the process.

She married her husband, Archie Richardson, on August 2, 1947, and had two children.

Richardson died on November 25, 2018, in Bedford, Ohio, at the age of 98.

== Books ==
- Chief of the Chiefs: Louis Rooks Bruce: Mohawk/Sioux, Commissioner of Indian Affairs and Lobbyist, a biography of Bureau of Indian Affairs Commissioner during the Nixon administration with heritage and cultural information about Native Americans in the United States in general and specifically the eastern Mohawk and western Sioux
- Eddie Elias: PBA Founder merchandised sports, corporate, TV worlds, a biography of Professional Bowlers Association founder Eddie Elias
- Gilbert, a biography of her brother, Gilbert Patch
- Steadfast the Lamp, a novel capturing the varied cultures of South India
- Remember When, recollections from the author's childhood to the days of her great-grandchildren
- Virgin Princess: an historic novel of Mewar (Udaipur, India) – the world's oldest dynasty, reveals Mewar's bizarre and enticing history
- India: Tourist Mecca, a guidebook about the Indian subcontinent
- Tender Hearts of India, a non-fiction cultural summary of north and south India
- One chapter of Tender Hearts of India was included in an anthology of Rajasthan
- Martha, a biography of her mother.
