= Ray Bluth =

American professional bowler (1927–2025)

Personal information
- Born: Raymond Bluth; December 31, 1927 St. Louis, Missouri, U.S.
- Died: April 11, 2025 (aged 97)
- Education: St. Louis University High School
- Years active: 1958-1975
- Height: 5 ft 10 in (178 cm)

Bowling Information
- Affiliation: PBA (charter member)
- Rookie year: 1958
- Dominant hand: Right
- Wins: 3 PBA Tour (including 1 major)
- 300-games: 5

Ray Bluth (December 31, 1927 – April 11, 2025) was an American professional bowler and charter member of the Professional Bowlers Association. While on tour, he won three tournament titles (including one major), was a fifteen-time runner-up, and finished in the top-five in over thirty events.

Bluth's lone major championship was at the 1959 ABC Masters, finishing above runner-up Billy Golembiewski. In other Masters tournaments, he finished 2nd in 1956 behind Dick Hoover, while in 1962 he became the first-ever bowler to roll a 300 game in the final round.

During the 1964 season, Bluth captured the Spokane PBA Open with a 266-pin lead over runner-up Les Schissler, aided by a 1,983 total pinfall over the final eight-game block (247.87 average). Ray also won the season's George Young Memorial High Average Award with a 210.512 average.

Bluth's third and last PBA title was at the 1969 Buckeye Open, defeating Nelson Burton, Jr. 236-205 in the championship match.

Among his 2nd place finishes, Ray's bid to defend his 1969 Buckeye Open title in 1970 was stopped by Nelson Burton, Jr. in the championship match. At the PBA National Championship, his also-ran finishes took place in 1963 and 1964.

Outside of PBA Tour competition, Ray was a member of the St. Louis Budweisers bowling team, which included Dick Weber, Don Carter, Tom Hennessey, and Pat Patterson. On March 12, 1958, the Buds set a long-standing 5-man ABC league series record during Masters League play in St. Louis by toppling 3,858 pins with 138 strikes, breaking the previous ABC record for a 5-man team of 3,797 set in 1937. The record-setting team score includes Ray's perfect 300 score in the 3rd game and 834 series.

Ray was inducted into the United States Bowling Congress Hall of Fame in 1973, PBA Hall of Fame in 1975 (inaugural class), the Missouri Sports Hall of Fame in 1992, and the St. Louis Sports Hall of Fame in 2016.

On April 11, 2025, Bluth died at his home in St. Louis surrounded by family.

== PBA Tour titles ==
Major championships in bold type.

1. **1959 ABC Masters (St. Louis, MO)**
2. 1964 Spokane PBA Open (Spokane, WA)
3. 1969 Buckeye Open (Toledo, OH)
