= 1961 PBA Tour season =

PBA Bowling Tour: 1961 Season
- League: Professional Bowlers Association
- Sport: Ten-pin bowling
- Duration: March 3 – December 19, 1961

PBA Tour
- Season MVP: None selected

PBA Tour seasons
- ← 1960 1962 →

This is a recap of the 1961 season for the Professional Bowlers Association (PBA) Tour. It was the tour's third season. It consisted of 13 events, seven of which were won by Dick Weber. Weber's three consecutive tournament wins in May would not be matched until Johnny Petraglia won three consecutive events in March-April of 1971.

One of the tournaments not won by Weber was the PBA National Championship, which went to Dave Soutar.

== Tournament schedule ==
Major championships in bold text.

| Event | Bowling center | City | Dates | Winner |
|---|---|---|---|---|
| Empire State PBA Open | Schade's Academy | Albany, New York | Mar 3–5 | Carmen Salvino (1) |
| National PBA Invitational | Paramus Bowl | Paramus, New Jersey | May 11–13 | Ray Lown (1) |
| All-American Classic | Cotton Bowl | Dallas, Texas | May 18–21 | Dick Weber (4) |
| Shreveport PBA Open | Southgate Lanes | Shreveport, Louisiana | May 22–24 | Dick Weber (5) |
| Fred Magee PBA Open | Recreation Bowling Lanes | Houston, Texas | May 26–29 | Dick Weber (6) |
| El Paso PBA Open | Freeway Lanes | El Paso, Texas | Jun 1–4 | Harry Smith (1) |
| Western Regional PBA Open | South Bay Bowling Center | Redondo Beach, California | Jun 7–10 | Dick Weber (7) |
| San Jose PBA Open | Saratoga Lanes | San Jose, California | Jun 13–15 | Dick Weber (8) |
| Northern California PBA Open | Brentwood Bowl | San Francisco, California | Jun 16–18 | Vern Downing (1) |
| Las Vegas PBA Invitational | Showboat Lanes | Las Vegas, Nevada | Jun 21–23 | George Howard (1) |
| **Second Annual National Championship** | Eastgate Coliseum | Cleveland, Ohio | Nov 9–13 | Dave Soutar (1) |
| Benesch PBA Open | Argo Bowl | Argo, Illinois | Dec 9–11 | Dick Weber (9) |
| Puerto Rico Invitational | Star Bowling Center | Rio Piedras, Puerto Rico | Dec 16–19 | Dick Weber (10) |
