= 1959 PBA Tour season =

PBA Bowling Tour: 1959 Season
- League: Professional Bowlers Association
- Sport: Ten-pin bowling
- Duration: May 22 – September 13, 1959

PBA Tour
- Season MVP: None selected

PBA Tour seasons
- n/a 1960 →

The 1959 season of the Professional Bowlers Association (PBA) Tour was the tour's first season, following the incorporation of the PBA in 1958. It consisted of three events, all east of the Mississippi.

== Tournament schedule ==
The PBA tour's first event, the $16,500 Empire State PBA open, was held at Schade's Academy, in Albany, New York. The first day of PBA competition was Friday, May 22, 1959. The competition ran until Sunday, May 24. 28 bowlers cashed in this competition. Lou Campi, of Dumont, New Jersey, won the first PBA event and took home the first prize of $2,500.

The tour then went to Paramus, New Jersey for the Paramus Eastern PBA Open from Thursday, May 28, 1959 to Saturday, May 30, 1959. Dick Weber began a long history of PBA success by winning his first title and $2,500 at Paramus Bowl.

After a layoff of several months, the PBA tour held its final event of the season at Bar-Jan Bowl in Dayton, Ohio. The event ran from September 10 to September 13. Weber became the first multiple champion on tour with his second title and a $2,600 prize.

Event	Bowling center	City	Dates	Winner
Empire State PBA Open	Schade's Academy	Albany, New York	May 22–24	Lou Campi (1)
Paramus Eastern PBA Open	Paramus Bowl	Paramus, New Jersey	May 28–30	Dick Weber (1)
Dayton PBA Open	Bar-Jan Lanes	Dayton, Ohio	Sep 10–13	Dick Weber (2)

== Leading money winners ==
Name	Earnings ($)	Top 5	Top 10	Cashes	Titles
Dick Weber	6,600	3	3	3	2
Lou Campi	4,000	2	2	2	1
Ed Lubanski	3,420	3	2	2	0
Ray Bluth	2,450	3	1	2	0
Joe Joseph	2,375	2	1	1	0
George Howard	1,888	1	1	1	0
Billy Golembiewski	1,720	3	0	3	0
Therm Gibson	1,600	3	1	1	0
Tom Hennessey	1,385	2	0	1	0
Al Savas	1,375	2	1	1	0
