= USBC Masters =

Bowling tournament

The USBC Masters is a championship ten-pin bowling event conducted by the United States Bowling Congress. The Professional Bowlers Association (PBA) began recognizing it as a title event in 1998, and it was designated one of the four majors in 2000. A PBA rule change in 2008 retroactively awarded a PBA title (and a major) to any Masters winners prior to 1998 who were PBA members at the time of the victory.

== History ==
The tournament began in 1951 as the ABC Masters, conducted by the American Bowling Congress (ABC). The ABC merged with the WIBC and YABA to become the USBC in 2005, after which the tournament was renamed USBC Masters. The Masters began as an invitational event showcasing national and local bowling stars and has grown to become one of bowling's most prestigious events.

While the event has evolved over the years, its trademark qualifying and double-elimination match play format has remained largely unchanged. All bowlers compete in 15 games of qualifying, with the top 63 qualifiers joining the previous year's champion in the double elimination match play bracket. If the previous champion makes the top 63 or is unable to participate, the 64th-place qualifier is added. All head-to-head matches consist of three games, where the highest total pinfall wins. First-time losers during the match play rounds are not eliminated, but are instead placed into an elimination bracket, where they must survive all subsequent three-game matches to have a chance at making the championship finals.

Hundreds of competitors turn out for the Masters each year (a full field of 390 entered the 2026 event) with their sights set on a prize fund that has recently been as high as $457,000, including a $100,000 top prize.

The Masters is open to PBA members and any USBC member who meets average requirements. It has been part of the World Bowling Tour.

After the Masters in January 2004, the tournament was moved to the fall, resulting in two Masters events during calendar year 2004. (The first was part of the 2003–04 PBA season, and the second was part of the 2004–05 season.) Then in 2008, the tournament was moved back to the spring, which is why there was no Masters during 2008.

=== Masters facts ===
- In 2007, Carolyn Dorin-Ballard became the first woman to bowl a perfect game in the USBC Masters.
- Dick Hoover (1956–57), Billy Welu (1964–65), Jason Belmonte (2013–15) and Anthony Simonsen (2022–23) are the only four players to successfully defend a Masters title, with Belmonte being the only player to win three times in a row.
- Mike Aulby was the first player to win the Masters three times (1989, 1995, 1998).
- Jason Belmonte was the first, and only, player to win the Masters four times (2013, 2014, 2015, 2017).
- Hall of Famer Earl Anthony won his 43rd, and final, PBA Tour title at the 1984 ABC Masters.
- Hall of Famer Ernie Schlegel, aged 53 years, 23 days, won the 1996 Masters and became the tournament’s oldest winner.
- Anthony Simonsen, aged 19 years, 39 days, won the 2016 Masters and became the tournament's youngest winner, as well as the youngest to win a PBA major of any kind. With his back-to-back wins in 2022 and 2023, Simonsen joined Aulby and Belmonte as the only players to win at least three Masters titles.

== Current Defending Champion ==
The current defending USBC Masters champion is David Krol.

=== 2026 Event ===
The 2026 USBC Masters was held at Thunderbowl Lanes in Allen Park, Michigan from March 22–28, with the televised stepladder final round on March 29. The tournament had a starting field of 390 bowlers and a $420,000 prize fund. The top 97 players (1:4) cashed, with the champion earning $100,000.

Fifth-seeded David "Boog" Krol climbed the ladder, eventually defeating top seed E. J. Tackett, 196–195, for his third PBA Tour title and first major.

Match #1
4	Matt Sanders	197
5	David Krol	216

Match #2
3	Jesper Svensson	202
5	David Krol	227

Title Match 1
2	Eric Jones	196
5	David Krol	206

Title Match 2
1	E. J. Tackett	195
5	David Krol	196

Prize Pool:

1. David Krol (Nixa, Missouri) – $100,000
2. E. J. Tackett (Ossian, Indiana) – $50,000
3. Eric Jones (Edmond, Oklahoma) – $25,000
4. Jesper Svensson (Sweden) – $15,000
5. Matt Sanders (Evansville, Indiana) – $10,000

== Past champions ==
- 1951 Lee Jouglard over Joe Wilman
- 1952 Willard Taylor over Andy Varipapa
- 1953 Rudy Habetler over Ed Brosius
- 1954 Eugene Elkins over Willard Taylor
- 1955 Buzz Fazio over Joe Kristof
- 1956 Dick Hoover over Ray Bluth
- 1957 Dick Hoover (2) over Bill Lillard
- 1958 Tom Hennessey over Lou Frantz
- 1959 Ray Bluth over Billy Golembiewski
- 1960 Billy Golembiewski over Steve Nagy
- 1961 Don Carter over Dick Hoover
- 1962 Billy Golembiewski (2) over Ron Winger
- 1963 Harry Smith over Bobby Meadows
- 1964 Billy Welu over Harry Smith
- 1965 Billy Welu (2) over Don Ellis
- 1966 Bob Strampe over Al Thompson
- 1967 Lou Scalia over Bill Johnson
- 1968 Pete Tountas over Buzz Fazio
- 1969 Jim Chestney over Barry Asher
- 1970 Don Glover over Bob Strampe
- 1971 Jim Godman over Don Johnson
- 1972 Bill Beach over Jim Godman
- 1973 Dave Soutar over Dick Ritger
- 1974 Paul Colwell over Steve Neff
- 1975 Ed Ressler Jr. over Sam Flanagan
- 1976 Nelson Burton Jr. over Steve Carson
- 1977 Earl Anthony over Jim Godman
- 1978 Frank Ellenburg over Earl Anthony
- 1979 Doug Myers over Bill Spigner
- 1980 Neil Burton over Mark Roth
- 1981 Randy Lightfoot over Skip Tucker
- 1982 Joe Berardi over Ted Hannahs
- 1983 Mike Lastowski over Pete Weber
- 1984 Earl Anthony (2) over Gil Sliker
- 1985 Steve Wunderlich over Tommy Kress
- 1986 Mark Fahy over Del Ballard Jr.
- 1987 Rick Steelsmith over Brad Snell
- 1988 Del Ballard Jr. over Keith Smith
- 1989 Mike Aulby over Mike Edwards
- 1990 Chris Warren over David Ozio
- 1991 Doug Kent over George Branham III
- 1992 Ken Johnson over Dave D'Entremont
- 1993 Norm Duke over Patrick Allen
- 1994 Steve Fehr over Steve Anderson
- 1995 Mike Aulby (2) over Mark Williams
- 1996 Ernie Schlegel over Mike Aulby
- 1997 Jason Queen over Eric Forkel
- 1998 Mike Aulby (3) over Parker Bohn III
- 1999 Brian Boghosian over Parker Bohn III
- 2000 Mika Koivuniemi over Pete Weber
- 2001 Parker Bohn III over Jason Couch
- 2002 Brett Wolfe over Dennis Horan Jr.
- 2003 Bryon Smith over Walter Ray Williams Jr.
- Jan. 2004 Walter Ray Williams Jr. over Chris Barnes
- Oct. 2004 Danny Wiseman over Patrick Allen
- 2005 Mike Scroggins over Norm Duke
- 2006 Doug Kent (2) over Jack Jurek
- 2007 Sean Rash over Steve Jaros
- 2008 not contested due to PBA schedule change
- 2009 John Nolen over Danny Wiseman
- 2010 Walter Ray Williams Jr. (2) over Chris Barnes
- 2011 Tom Hess over Jack Jurek
- 2012 Mike Fagan over Chris Barnes
- 2013 Jason Belmonte over Wes Malott
- 2014 Jason Belmonte (2) over E. J. Tackett
- 2015 Jason Belmonte (3) over A. J. Johnson
- 2016 Anthony Simonsen over Dan MacLelland
- 2017 Jason Belmonte (4) over Michael Tang
- 2018 Andrew Anderson over Alex Hoskins
- 2019 Jakob Butturff over Mykel Holliman
- 2020 not contested due to COVID-19 pandemic
- 2021 Thomas Larsen over Jesper Svensson
- 2022 Anthony Simonsen (2) over Norm Duke
- 2023 Anthony Simonsen (3) over Michael Martell
- 2024 DeeRonn Booker over Patrick Dombrowski
- 2025 Gary Haines over Anthony Simonsen
- 2026 David Krol over E. J. Tackett

Note: In May 2008, the PBA announced it was revising its all-time records to include PBA-era ABC Masters championships prior to 1998 as PBA titles (and majors), if the champion was a PBA member at the time.
