= Fred Schreyer =

Fred Schreyer was the CEO and Commissioner of the Professional Bowlers Association (PBA). Schreyer joined the PBA in October 2002, serving as the Chief Operating Officer and General Counsel. He later became the PBA Commissioner in 2003. When Steve Miller resigned in September 2005, Schreyer took over the leadership of the PBA, but continued in his role as Commissioner, as well. After Schreyer retired in 2011, his role was split: Deputy Commissioner Tom Clark was promoted to Commissioner of the PBA and Geoff Reiss was named CEO.
