= Tom Clark (sports executive) =

American sports executive

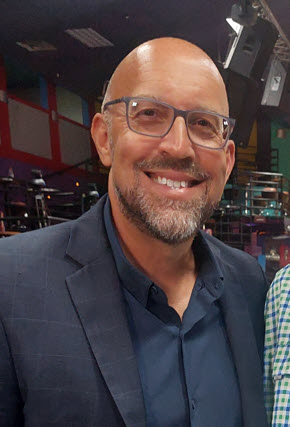
- Clark in 2025

Commissioner of the Professional Bowlers Association
- Incumbent
- Assumed office November 1, 2011
- Preceded by: Fred Schreyer

Personal details
- Born: Thomas Peter Clark; April 29, 1969 (age 57) Syracuse, New York, U.S.
- Spouse: Kelli Quinn Clark
- Children: 2
- Education: Buffalo State University

Thomas Peter Clark (born April 29, 1969) is an American sports executive who has served as Commissioner of the Professional Bowlers Association (PBA) since 2011. Clark took over as commissioner following the retirement of Fred Schreyer, who had filled the dual role of PBA Commissioner and CEO since 2005.

== Early life ==
Clark was born in Syracuse, New York, and attended West Genesee High School in Camillus, New York. He then attended Buffalo State University where he received his Bachelor's degree in journalism. An avid bowler since early childhood, Clark says he chose Buffalo State specifically because it had a bowling program. He became a member of the school's bowling team and competed nationally.

== Early professional career ==
Clark spent over a decade in print journalism, including a stint as Sports Assignment Editor for USA Today. While filling that role, Clark says he pushed for better media coverage of bowling, feeling that the media "never treated bowling fairly." As industry insiders read and responded to Clark's articles, it led to his first job in the bowling business as Chief Marketing Officer for the United States Bowling Congress (USBC) in 2005. In April 2008, he was hired as Deputy Commissioner of the PBA, working under then-Commissioner and CEO Fred Schreyer.

Clark's time as Deputy Commissioner coincided with the collapse of the U.S. financial industry in 2008 and 2009. Faced with financial issues, the PBA and ESPN jointly worked on ways to cut costs. One idea was to hold multiple tournaments in one location which could have the final rounds recorded and aired at a later date, thus saving on talent and crew travel costs. It also reduced the travel costs for PBA players, who are essentially independent contractors that take care of their own travel expenses. The result was the very first PBA World Series of Bowling, which Clark created, held August–September 2009 in Allen Park, Michigan. The World Series of Bowling continues through the present, and held its 17th annual event in May of 2026.

== PBA commissioner ==
Following Schreyer’s retirement in October 2011, his dual role was split. Tom Clark was promoted to PBA Commissioner (effective November 1, 2011), while Geoff Reiss was named CEO. With a staff of 17 people and a four-person advisory board, Clark oversees the PBA membership, which numbers over 3,000 worldwide. While the membership includes some pro shop professionals, it is mostly made up of bowling athletes who compete at all levels (PBA Tour, PBA Regional Tour, PBA50 Tour, PBA60 Tour, PBA Jr. and the recently added PBA League Bowler Certification program). Clark also oversees other agendas such as PBA sanctioned competitions, communications, sponsorships and media coverage.

In his early years as Commissioner, Clark presided over some key changes in the PBA:

- Expansion of the PBA World Series of Bowling to include hundreds of bowlers from almost 30 countries. Clark has credited the World Series of Bowling with inspiring an influx of international stars who now regularly compete on the PBA Tour.
- Partnership with the World Bowling Tour (WBT), beginning in the 2012–13 season, in which selected events around the world offer a PBA title if won by a PBA member.
- Launch of the PBA League Elias Cup team tournament in 2013, a popular event featuring eight teams of PBA touring professionals that continues to the current day as the PBA Elite League.
- The return of the PBA Players Championship to major status in 2015, giving the PBA Tour a total of five major events.
- The launch of the PBA Xtra Frame webcast service, which broadcast selected events beginning in the 2015 season. While hosting the live finals of some events, the Xtra Frame service also allowed bowling fans to watch qualifying and match play rounds, which were previously unavailable to anyone not in attendance at the event. (Live streaming of selected PBA tournaments moved to FloBowling in 2021, and then to BowlTV in 2023.)

In 2018, Clark led the transition of the PBA's television media rights from ESPN (which had held the rights since 2001) to Fox Broadcasting. PBA Tournament broadcasts began airing on FS1 as well as Fox network terrestrial stations in the 2019 season. For his bold move to award TV rights to Fox and negotiate 60 hours of PBA Tour TV coverage over the 2019 season (versus 32 hours on ESPN in 2018), Clark was named Bowlers Journal International 2018 Person of the Year. In August 2023, the PBA and Fox agreed on a two-year extension of their broadcast partnership through the 2025 season. Following the termination of the Fox contract after the 2025 season, Clark managed the transition of PBA broadcast rights to CW Sports and CBS networks for 2026 and later.

Late in 2019, the PBA was purchased by Bowlero Corporation (now Lucky Strike Entertainment Corporation). Bowlero installed Colie Edison as CEO of the PBA, while retaining Clark as Commissioner.

During the 2020 season, Clark presided over major scheduling changes as a result of the COVID-19 pandemic. The PBA was able to put on 14 title events this season, many held without an audience.

In January 2022, Colie Edison resigned as PBA CEO to take a position with the WNBA. The CEO position remained vacant through 2025, making Clark the de facto leader of the PBA for four seasons before the PBA and Lucky Strike Entertainment hired Peter Murray as CEO and Head of Media in January 2026.

== Hall of Fame ==
In November 2024, Clark was elected to the USBC Hall of Fame for Meritorious Service. He was inducted with the 2025 class in a ceremony at the USBC Convention on May 7.

== National Awards ==
- 2x Bowlers Journal International (BJI) Person of the Year (2005, 2018)
- Bowling and Billiards Institute of America (BBIA) Industry Service Award (2008)
- United States Bowling Congress (USBC) Joyce Deitch Trailblazer Award (2009)
- John Davis Award for extraordinary efforts on behalf of the advancement of the Sport of Bowling, presented by Kegel (2019)
- Bowling Proprietors Association of America (BPAA) Media Award (2020)
- International Bowling Museum and Hall of Fame Striking Contribution Award (2024)
- International Bowling Media Alberta E. Crowe Meritorious Service Award (2024)
- 2025 USBC Hall of Fame inductee (Meritorious Service category)

== Personal ==
After joining the USBC in 2005, Clark moved to Muskego, Wisconsin, where he currently resides with wife Kelli. The couple has two children, Rory and Quinn. Rory recently competed for the bowling team at Marian University in Fond du Lac, Wisconsin, after previously bowling for University of Wisconsin–Whitewater.

In addition to his PBA duties, Clark briefly served as Director of Sport and Competitions for the International Bowling Federation (IBF) in late 2021.
