= Billy Hardwick =

American ten-pin bowler (1941–2013)

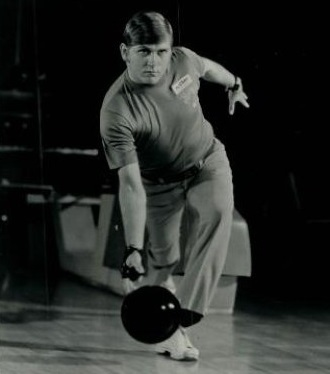
- Hardwick in 1972

Personal information
- Born: William Bruce Hardwick; July 25, 1941 Florence, Alabama, U.S.
- Died: November 16, 2013 (aged 72) Bradenton, Florida, U.S.
- Years active: 1961–1977
- Height: 183 cm (6 ft 0 in)

Bowling Information
- Affiliation: PBA
- Rookie year: 1963
- Dominant hand: Right (full roller delivery)
- Wins: 18 PBA Tour (3 majors)

William Bruce Hardwick (July 25, 1941 – November 16, 2013) was an American right-handed ten-pin bowler and member of the Professional Bowlers Association.

== PBA career ==
Hardwick joined the PBA Tour in 1961, and amassed a total of 18 PBA titles during his career. He was the first player to capture the PBA career "Triple Crown," which is achieved by winning the three original PBA major tournaments: U.S. Open, PBA National Championship, and Tournament of Champions. Hardwick captured all three between 1963 and 1969. There have been only eight other Triple Crown winners since: Johnny Petraglia, Mike Aulby, Pete Weber, Norm Duke, Chris Barnes, Jason Belmonte, Dominic Barrett and E. J. Tackett.

Hardwick was named PBA Player of the Year in both the 1963 and 1969 seasons. A 22-year old in 1963, Hardwick is still the youngest bowler to ever win PBA Player of the Year honors (through 2025). In 1969, he matched Dick Weber's 1961 PBA record by winning seven titles in one season. The record would stand until 1978, when it was broken by Mark Roth's eight titles. Another record, which still stands even in this high scoring era, is the 2165 for an eight-game block achieved in Japan in 1968.

Billy was ranked #12 on the PBA's 2008 list of "50 Greatest Players of the Last 50 Years". He retired relatively early from the PBA Tour after developing arthritis. Billy's final PBA title came in April, 1976 at the Monro-Matic Open in Toledo, Ohio when he was still just 34 years old. He was inducted into the PBA Hall of Fame in 1977, and was the proprietor of Billy Hardwick's All-Star Lanes in Memphis.

Billy injured the third finger of his right hand in a machine shop accident while in high school. As a result, this finger would not bend, making it impossible to use a conventional bowling ball grip (thumb, third finger, and ring finger). Instead, he used his thumb and first two fingers.

Billy was known for his full roller delivery. A full roller rolls the ball over the full circumference of the ball, with the ball track going through the palm of the bowling ball at an angle between the gripping holes. Billy was unique in that he rolled a very straight ball with little side turn or hook. Billy also rolled the ball much slower than most other players. With his straighter, slower, full roller delivery and his pinpoint accuracy (he rarely missed a spare and often converted the splits he was faced with), Billy was able to lay the ball tightly into the pocket again and again and consistently carry the strike.

For this seemingly contradictory ability to roll straight and still carry strikes, he was nicknamed "The Magician" when he was competing on the 1965 "Championship Bowling" TV show. During the 1976 Firestone Tournament of Champions title match, where Billy faced a young Marshall Holman, analyst Nelson Burton Jr. remarked to Chris Schenkel on seeing Billy throw his second opening strike in a row with his slow straight shot, "How does he do it, Chris?! Everyone wonders how Hardwick does it." After his third strike in a row, Nelson further commented, "It is almost unbelievable the control and accuracy of Hardwick. He does not depend on the power strikes like Marshall Holman, he depends on splicing a small target out there at the arrows. When Hardwick is right, he can hit a half-board, consistently, 20 foot down the lane, Chris. Put it right in the pocket. All three strikes he's got so far are perfect packed strikes."

After his career, while living in Florida, he was an important mentor to Glenn Hannigan, who he groomed to be "the best bowling writer in the county". Hannigan later became a leading writer and editor for the Atlanta Journal-Constitution and authored many books on the Olympics. Hannigan credits Hardwick with making him comfortable asking the tough questions to elite athletes.

According to his son, Chris, speaking on the Opie & Anthony Show on August 12, 2010, Hardwick was the last athlete to film a beer commercial profiling athletes. Chris added that his father originally had lines in the commercial but, "got a little intoxicated after so many takes that they cut out his lines for the commercial." A decision was made after that commercial that it would make a bad impression on the youth to give the message that if you want to become a champion, you should drink.

=== PBA Tour titles ===
Major championships in bold type.

1. 1963 Mobile Sertoma PBA Open (Mobile, Alabama)
2. 1963 Phoenix PBA Open (Mesa, Arizona)
3. 1963 Los Angeles PBA Open (Gardena, California)
4. **1963 PBA National Championship** (Garden City, New York)
5. 1964 Birmingham Coca-Cola Open (Birmingham, Alabama)
6. 1964 North American Van Lines Open (Pontiac, Michigan)
7. 1964 Southern California PBA Open (Costa Mesa, California)
8. **1965 Firestone Tournament of Champions** (Akron, Ohio)
9. 1967 Kokomo Open (Kokomo, Indiana)
10. 1968 Seattle Open (Seattle, Washington)
11. 1969 Denver Open (Denver, Colorado)
12. 1969 Miller High Life Open (Milwaukee, Wisconsin)
13. 1969 Smallcomb Enterprises Classic (Redwood City, California)
14. **1969 BPAA All-Star** (U.S. Open) (Hialeah, Florida)
15. 1969 Fort Worth Open (Fort Worth, Texas)
16. 1969 Grand Rapids Open (Grand Rapids, Michigan)
17. 1969 Joliet Open (Joliet, Illinois)
18. 1976 Monro-Matic Open (Toledo, Ohio)

== Personal life ==
Hardwick married five times and had four children, two of whom died in infancy. He also has two stepdaughters. He is the father of comedian and television personality Chris Hardwick.

== Death ==
Billy Hardwick died on November 16, 2013. He was preparing to return from Sarasota, Florida to Memphis, Tennessee, with his wife Rebecca, when he suffered an apparent heart attack and died shortly afterwards. He was 72 years old.
