= Lou Campi =

Personal information
- Born: 23 March 1905 Verona, Italy
- Died: 31 August 1989 (aged 84) Dumont, New Jersey, U.S.
- Years active: 1935–1967

Bowling Information
- Affiliation: PBA
- Rookie year: 1959
- Dominant hand: Right
- Sponsors: Brunswick

Lou Campi (23 March 1905 – 31 August 1989) was a professional bowler. He was known as Wrong Foot Louie, a reference to the fact that he completed his delivery on his right foot, unlike most right-handed bowlers who finish with the left foot forward. Campi was born in Verona, Italy.

In the 1940s, he was a successful television bowler.

In 1947, he won the BPAA Doubles with Andy Varipapa and in 1957 he did the same again with his Faber Cement Block teammate Al Lindy Faragalli.

He won the first ever event on the PBA Tour: the 1959 Empire State PBA Open. At age 54, he is still the third oldest player to win a PBA Tour title.
