= Dick Hoover =

American ten-pin bowler

Richard Lee Hoover (December 15, 1929 – September 17, 2009) was an American professional bowler. He won two American Bowling Congress Masters titles in 1956 and 1957, becoming the first player to successfully defend a Masters title. Only three other players (Billy Welu, Jason Belmonte and Anthony Simonsen) have accomplished the feat since. Hoover helped start the Professional Bowlers Association (PBA) in 1958 with founder Eddie Elias.

Born in Roseville, Ohio, Hoover grew up in Akron. He gained his first fame as a 16-year-old schoolboy by rolling an 847 series, the highest ABC sanctioned series in the nation during 1946. Five years later, at 21, he became the youngest bowler to win the BPAA All-Star tournament (predecessor to the U.S. Open). A four-time All-American, he was inducted into the ABC (now USBC) Hall of Fame in 1974.

Hoover won his first and only PBA Tour title at the 1962 PBA Colt Open in Baltimore, Maryland. He had 11 top-five finishes and two runner-up finishes during his PBA career.

Hoover owned and operated Dick Hoover's Lanes in Brunswick, Ohio.
