= Don Carter (bowler) =

American professional ten-pin bowler

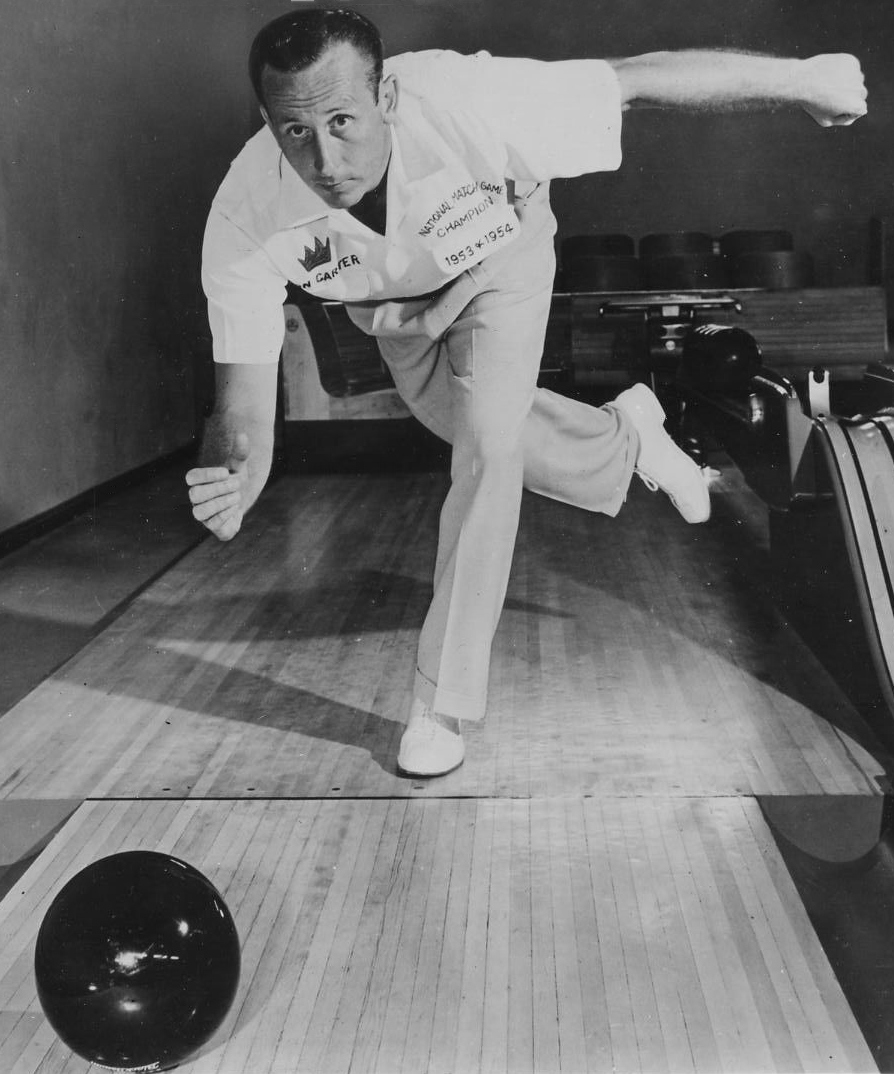
- Carter, c. 1955

Personal information
- Born: Donald James Carter; July 29, 1926 St. Louis, Missouri, U.S.
- Died: 5 January 2012 (aged 85) Miami, Florida, U.S.
- Years active: 1951-1972

Sport

Bowling Information
- Affiliation: PBA, BPAA, ABC
- Dominant hand: Right
- Wins: 4 BPAA (all majors); 5 World International; 5 ABC (1 individual, 4 team); 7 PBA Tour (2 majors)
- Sponsors: Ebonite

Donald James Carter (July 29, 1926 – January 5, 2012) was a right-handed American professional bowler. Born in St. Louis, Missouri, he learned the game while working a childhood job as a pinsetter, and went on to become one of the legends of ten-pin bowling and a founding member of the Professional Bowlers Association (PBA) in 1958.

He was six-time bowler of the year, a 10-time All-American, and became known simply as "Mr. Bowling." Carter and fellow St. Louis native Dick Weber are widely regarded as professional bowling's first superstars. He was voted the Greatest Bowler of All-Time in a 1970 Bowling Magazine poll, and ranked #1 among 20th Century bowlers by Bowlers Journal in 1999. At the vanguard of celebrity endorsement, he capitalized on his fame during televised bowling's most popular period to become the first athlete of any kind to earn $1,000,000 in a single endorsement deal, for Ebonite International.

== Bowling career ==
Prior to the PBA being formed, Carter was known as a dominant bowler in major tournaments of the 1950s, as well as in team play. In the nine BPAA All-Star tournaments (predecessor to the U.S. Open) between 1952 and 1960, Carter won four times in eight events (he withdrew one year due to injury) and never finished lower than fourth. He won five World Invitational events in a six-year span (1957 to 1962), finishing second the only year he did not win. He also won one ABC Masters title in 1961.

Carter also won four tournaments during the 1950s in the ABC Open Championships Classic Division. As a team bowler, Carter helped the Pfeiffer Beer team of Detroit, Michigan, win the 1953 ABC Open Championships before he moved back to St. Louis. Carter was then part of the "Budweisers" Bowling Team that won the National Team Match Games title four times in five years (1956, 1957, 1959, 1960). On March 12, 1958, this team established an ABC league series record for a five-man team (3,858 pins) that stood for more than 35 years. Carter rolled games of 266, 253 and 235 in that session for a 754 series. Ray Bluth, Dick Weber, Tom Hennessey, and Pat Patterson were also on that 1958 team. Said teammate Bluth, "Don was the greatest bowler of his era (and) was the star of the Budweisers. He was our leadoff man. He wasn't too gung-ho about that role, but he kept getting strikes and so did the rest of us, so he stayed there."

Unlike most bowlers who keep their arm straight on the backswing as they are about to release the ball, Carter kept his elbow bent, never straightening his arm. With the format for bowling (a single player at a time on a stationary lane) lending itself well to early two-camera live television setups, prominent players like Carter began to be seen on TV sets across the United States. He appeared regularly on bowling shows like Bowling Stars, Championship Bowling, Jackpot Bowling and Make That Spare.

With Carter's encouragement, lawyer/businessman Eddie Elias proposed a pro tour to a number of players at the 1958 ABC Open Championships in Syracuse, New York. Carter was one of 33 bowlers who each donated $50 to get the PBA started, and Elias would later become Carter's business manager. Although the PBA was not formed until Carter was 32 years old, he still won seven PBA titles, including two majors: the inaugural PBA National Championship in 1960 and the ABC Masters in 1961. He also made the finals of the 1962 PBA National Championship, but finished runner-up to Carmen Salvino. Carter won four titles and $49,000 in prize money in 1962 alone (about $525,000 in 2025 dollars). That year, he also made 18 top-five finishes (still a PBA record), including seven straight top-five finishes (a feat matched only by Dick Weber and E. J. Tackett since), and he was named the Bowling Writers Association of America's Bowler of the Year.

In 1964, he signed a $1,000,000 multi-year deal to endorse Ebonite bowling products, at the time the highest single deal of its kind. By that time, Carter was already grossing more than $100,000 a year (about $1,073,000 in 2025 dollars) between bowling tournaments, exhibitions and other endorsements.

Carter was the PBA's first president, and served four years overall in that capacity. Recurring knee problems forced him to retire from competitive bowling in 1972. Said Carter in a 1994 interview: "I didn't just want to go out there and show up. I wanted to win. If I couldn't win, I didn't want to compete. My knees made it so I couldn't practice and hardly could complete a tournament."

=== Pre-PBA and Non-PBA individual titles ===
- 1953 BPAA All-Star
- 1954 BPAA All-Star
- 1957 BPAA All-Star
- 1957 World Invitational
- 1958 BPAA All-Star
- 1959 World Invitational
- 1960 World Invitational
- 1961 World Invitational
- 1962 World Invitational

=== PBA Tour titles ===
Major titles in bold type.

1. 1960 Paramus Eastern PBA Open (Paramus, New Jersey)
2. **1960 First Annual PBA National Championship** (Memphis, Tennessee)
3. **1961 ABC Masters** (Detroit, Michigan)
4. 1962 Houston PBA Open (Houston, Texas)
5. 1962 Santa Fair PBA Open (Seattle, Washington)
6. 1962 Tucson PBA Open (Tucson, Arizona)
7. 1962 Rochester PBA Open (Rochester, New York)

== Personal life ==
Carter enlisted in the United States Navy in 1944, and spent two years as a radarman in the South Pacific. He was a baseball player in high school, and played AAU baseball with the likes of Yogi Berra and Joe Garagiola. He signed a minor-league contract with the Philadelphia Athletics in the fall of 1946. After one minor league season, he hung up his baseball spikes and returned to St. Louis to take a job at Golden Eagle Lanes. Working as an alley man, bartender and janitor, he bowled as often as he could during his time off.

In 1951, he was invited to bowl for the Pfeiffer Beer team in Detroit, where his bowling career reached high momentum.

Carter married professional bowler LaVerne Haverly (née Thompson) in 1953. The two divorced in 1964. His second marriage, to Pat Hardwick in 1966, ended in a 1972 divorce. In 1973, Carter married professional bowler Paula Sperber, who had won the 1971 U.S. Women's Open and had an outstanding pro bowling career. Carter's first and third wives, Haverly and Sperber, are both in the WIBC (now USBC) Hall of Fame. Don remained married to Paula until his death in 2012. For a few seasons, the PBA held a mixed doubles tournament called the Don and Paula Carter Mixed Doubles Championship.

Beginning in 1978, Carter appeared in selected TV commercials for Miller Lite beer, which had begun using athletes and celebrities in its ad campaigns a few years prior.

Carter died on January 5, 2012, from complications of both emphysema and pneumonia. He was 85. His first wife LaVerne would die only two months later.

== Milestones and recognition ==
- Established a 234 league average in 1959, the highest that season in a sanctioned American Bowling Congress league
- Inducted into ABC Hall of Fame, 1970
- Inducted into PBA Hall of Fame, 1975 (inaugural member)
- In 1958, he wrote a book entitled "10 Secrets of Bowling" with the help of illustrator Anthony Ravielli.
- In 1975, he wrote another book entitled, "Bowling The Pro Way" in association with George Kenney and illustrated by Simon Pavkov.

Carter was known for a number of bowling "firsts":

- First to record three All-Events totals of 1900 pins or higher at the ABC Open Championships (1951, 1952 and 1953)
- First to convert the sweepstakes spare on the Make That Spare television show (1961), as well as the first to make the spare twice
- First bowler to crack the jackpot for six consecutive strikes on the Jackpot Bowling television show
- First to bowl an 800 series on television (809 at the 1956 National Bowling Championships)
- First bowler to win every possible major tournament in his era (BPAA All-Star, World Invitational, PBA National Championship and ABC Masters)
- First president of the PBA
- First bowler to have a professional tournament named after him
- First athlete to sign a $1 million endorsement contract, inking a multi-year deal with Ebonite International in 1964
