= Steve Nagy (bowler) =

American bowler (1913–1966)

- Born: August 10, 1913; Shoaf, Pennsylvania, U.S.
- Died: November 11, 1966 (aged 53); Cleveland, Ohio, U.S.

Steve Nagy (August 10, 1913 − November 11, 1966) was an American professional bowler from Cleveland, Ohio.

== Early life ==
Nagy was born on August 10, 1913, in the small mining town of Shoaf, Pennsylvania. His family moved to Cleveland, Ohio, when he was eight years old. When Nagy was eleven, he worked at a bowling alley as a pinsetter.

== Bowling career ==
Nagy’s bowling career started in 1939, when he competed at the American Bowling Congress tournament in Cleveland. In 1952, the Bowling Writers Association of America named him Bowler of the Year. In 1954, he was a contestant on NBC’s Championship Bowling where he rolled a perfect game. A few months later, he was the winner of the 1955 Bowling Proprietor's Association of America All-Star competition. In 1963, he was inducted into the American Bowling Congress hall of fame.

== Death ==
In 1965, Nagy was hospitalized after suffering a stroke. He died on November 11, 1966.
