= Carmen Salvino =

American ten-pin bowler

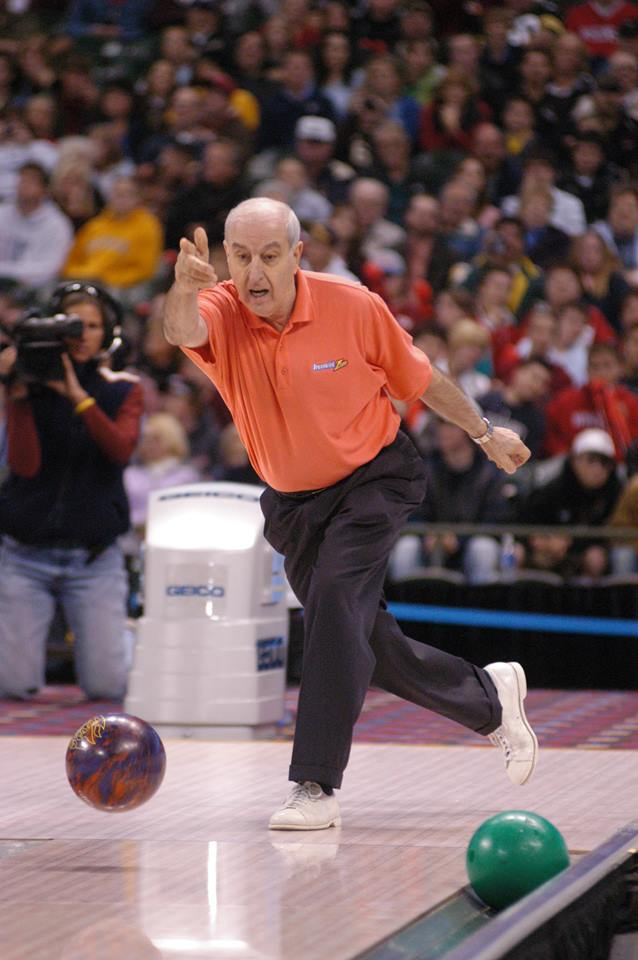
- Salvino in 2006

Personal information
- Born: November 23, 1933 (age 92) Chicago, Illinois, U.S.
- Years active: 1953−present

Bowling Information
- Affiliation: PBA, ABC
- Dominant hand: Right
- Wins: 17 PBA Tour (1 major); 2 PBA Senior Tour (1 major)

Carmen Salvino (born November 23, 1933) is an American active professional ten-pin bowler, inventor, author, ambassador, and a founding member of the Professional Bowlers Association (PBA). Known as "PBA's Original Showman", Salvino won 17 PBA Tour titles – among them the 1962 PBA National Championship where he defeated fellow bowling legend Don Carter in the finals. He also won two PBA Senior Tour titles, including the 1984 Senior National Championship. The right-handed bowler was among the eight original inductees to the PBA Hall of Fame in 1975, and is also a member of the USBC Hall of Fame (inducted 1979), the National Italian American Sports Hall of Fame (inducted 1985), the Illinois Sports Hall of Fame, and the Chicagoland Sports Hall of Fame.

== Early life ==
Salvino was born in Chicago, Illinois, on November 23, 1933, to Michael and Philomena (Theresa) Salvino (nee DeVito). He has two brothers, Joseph and Richard, and a sister, Phylis, they lived on the city's west side until the age of 5. In order to make a better living during the Great Depression, Salvino's father moved the entire family to Dania, Florida where he worked as a vegetable farmer in a job created by President Roosevelt's New Deal Works Progress Administration (WPA) program. During his childhood years, Salvino learned his strong work ethic from helping his father manually plow vegetable fields for long, strenuous work days. Despite the hard work, his family was still very poor. For an entire year, he didn't own a pair of shoes, and for two straight years, he owned only one pair of overalls.

After living in Florida for 5 years, the family moved back to Chicago's west side and the young Salvino found work shining shoes on Madison Street. In 1945, at the age of 11, Salvino was introduced to bowling when he was walking down a street in his west-side neighborhood and noticed a bowling pin lying on the ground outside the Amalgamated Center located at 333 S. Ashland. The building was home to the Amalgamated Clothing Workers of America labor union and it housed a private 6-lane bowling alley reserved for workers in the garment industry. His interest piqued, Salvino walked inside the building and talked to a man who oversaw the bowling lanes. In a stroke of luck, he offered the young Salvino a job making three dollars a night as a pin-boy. He then began to practice. The first ball Salvino ever threw was a strike, and it was there, at the Amalgamated Center, that a legend was born.

Salvino attended Crane Tech High School on Chicago's west side. At the age of 16, Salvino was averaging 203 (a very high average for the time), and at 17, he joined his high school's first bowling team and averaged 211. According to Salvino, he was the first person to letter in the sport of bowling which at the time was governed by the then American Junior Bowling Congress. Also, while still in high school, he competed in a national tournament called the Dom DeVito Classic where he beat approximately 6,000 bowlers for the first place prize of $3,000. He then became the youngest bowler ever to compete in The Chicago Classic League, a renowned area competition, and earned the nickname "Chicago's Boy Wonder". In order to intimidate his opponents, Salvino would wear bib overalls with the statement, "I'm great and I'm gonna be the best bowler alive" written on the back. According to him, "The way to show 'em is to beat 'em, stomp on 'em and let 'em know how good I am. I was hated by the players and the public. After a while I didn't care. I was getting bigger and meaner all the time."

Salvino married his wife Virginia Morelli on May 17, 1956.

== Professional and PBA career ==
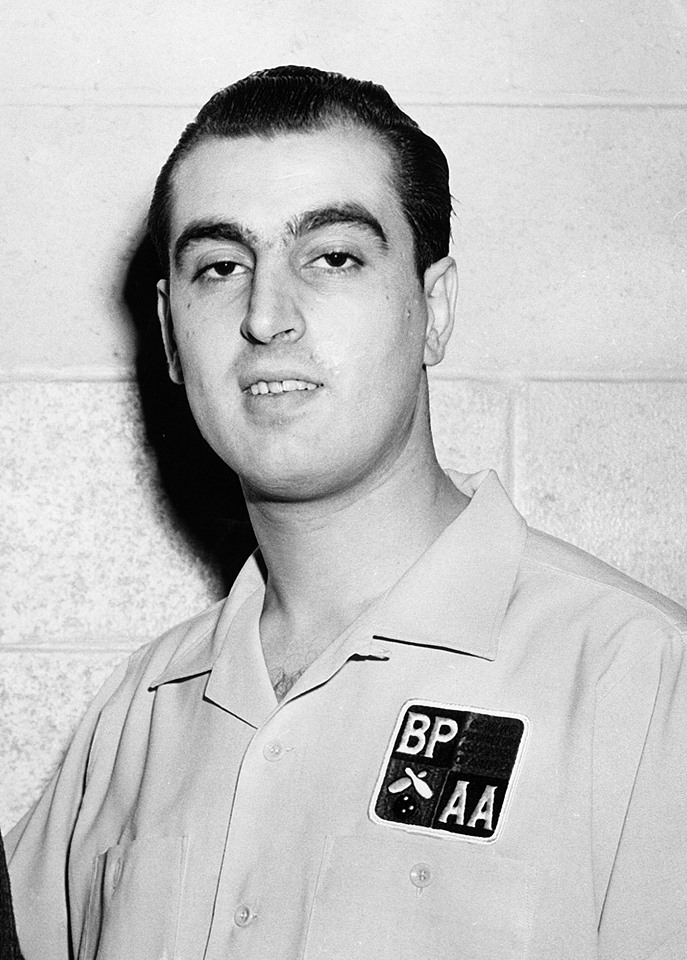
Carmen Salvino in the 1950s during his early professional career

Before the PBA's founding in 1958, Salvino began his professional bowling career when in 1953 he won the National Match Game Doubles with his partner Joe Wilman. According to Salvino, "The National Doubles title really kicked off my career nationally, by the time I was 21, I had won the Chicago Match Game tournament, had an ABC Tournament team title and was Chicago Bowler of the Year, so I was getting a reputation as a pretty good bowler by that time."

In 1954, Salvino won his first ABC (American Bowling Congress) title; a team event with the renowned squad Tri-Par Radio. Soon after the win, Salvino became a household name when he regularly appeared on televised bowling events, most notably the show Bowling Stars. It was on Bowling Stars that he scored 846, which at the time was the highest three-game series ever broadcast on television.

After hearing a presentation by sports agent Eddie Elias in 1958, Salvino and 32 other bowlers donated $50 each to help launch the Professional Bowlers Association (PBA). In the 1960s, Salvino's PBA career took off. He won ten PBA titles in that decade, with the first coming at the 1961 Empire State Open in Albany, N.Y. His first and only major came in the 1962 PBA National Championship. Salvino continued to win PBA Tour titles through the 1970s, including two in the 1975 season in which he defeated Earl Anthony in the championship match both times. His 17th and final singles title was earned at age 45 in the Miller High Life Open, the first event of the 1979 season.

Despite all his victories, Salvino listed a loss to his good friend Dick Weber in the finals of the 1988 PBA Showboat Senior Invitational among his most memorable tournaments. Due to the matches being completed ahead of schedule that day, Salvino and Weber were interviewed at the end of the broadcast and spent several minutes recalling memories of bowling's heyday.

Nicknamed "The Professor", Salvino claimed in the 1970s to have based his bowling style on a mathematical equation, which he never revealed. The equation covered the bowling stance and ball delivery that stressed accuracy.

=== PBA Tour titles ===
Major championships in bold text.

1. 1961 Third Empire State Open (Albany, New York)
2. 1962 Pontiac PBA Open (Pontiac, Michigan)
3. **1962 PBA National Championship** (Philadelphia, Pennsylvania)
4. 1963 Jacksonville PBA Open (Jacksonville, Florida)
5. 1964 Rockford Coca-Cola Open (Rockford, Illinois)
6. 1965 Bergen Mall PBA Open (Paramus, New Jersey)
7. 1965 Birmingham PBA Open (Birmingham, Alabama)
8. 1967 Saint Paul Open (Saint Paul, Minnesota)
9. 1967 Mobile-Sertoma Open (Mobile, Alabama)
10. 1968 Venezuelan Invitational (Caracas, Venezuela)
11. 1973 Lincoln-Mercury Open (New Orleans, Louisiana)
12. 1974 New Jersey Open (Edison, New Jersey)
13. 1975 Showboat Invitational (Las Vegas, Nevada)
14. 1975 Home Box Office Open (Pittsburgh, Pennsylvania)
15. 1976 Quad Cities Open (Davenport, Iowa)
16. 1977 Houston Open (Houston, Texas)
17. 1979 Miller High Life Open (Anaheim, California)

=== PBA Senior Tour titles ===
Major championships in bold text:

1. **1984 PBA Senior National Championship**
2. 1988 Kessler Senior/Touring Pro Doubles Championship w/Randy Pedersen (Cheektowaga, NY)

== Legacy ==
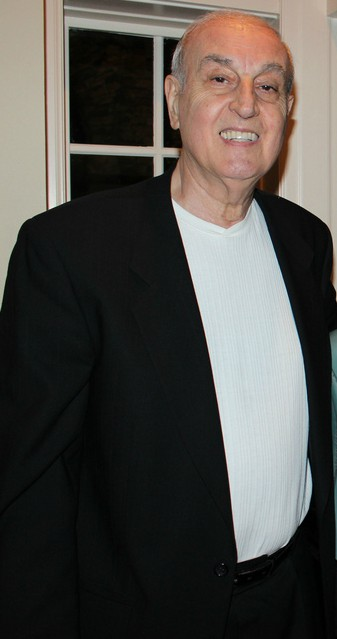
Carmen Salvino in 2012

Salvino has made a number of memorable marks on the sport of bowling throughout his eight decades (1950s-2020s): champion, Hall-of-Famer, showman, entertainer, bowling health enthusiast, and bowling ball scientist in the areas of physics and chemistry. He also served the PBA in various capacities, including executive board and tournament committee positions, plus one term as PBA president (1985–86).

Salvino was ranked #17 on the PBA's 2008 list of "50 Greatest Players of the last 50 years." The 1999 Bowlers Journal ranking of 20th Century bowlers rated him #34. In 2008, Salvino won the BPAA's Dick Weber Bowling Ambassador Award, an honor given annually to the "bowling athlete who has consistently shown grace on and off the lanes by promoting the sport of bowling in a positive manner."

One of the oil patterns the PBA uses in current tournaments is the "Carmen Salvino 43", which is 43 feet (13.11 meters) in length.

== Antics on and off the lanes ==
Carmen Salvino is known for his trademark showmanship and colorful behavior on and off the lanes. In 2019, he both bowled in and provided live commentary on the PBA Tournament of Champions.

== Later life ==
As of 2022, Salvino, along with his wife Virginia, has resided in Schaumburg, Illinois (USA). For the past 20 years he has remained active in various capacities in the PBA. In a 2013 interview, Salvino stated he has rolled 105 perfect 300 games and practices up to 20 games a session. He credits his in-depth study of physics, good health, and longevity as the primary reasons for his success in the sport.

Salvino competed in the Go Bowling! PBA 60th Anniversary Classic, held Feb. 13–18, 2018 in Indianapolis. This made him the oldest player (age 84) to ever participate in a standard PBA Tour event. Though he did not make it out of the qualifying round, Salvino rolled the honorary first ball for the televised finals and got a strike.
