= Billy Welu =

American professional ten-pin bowler

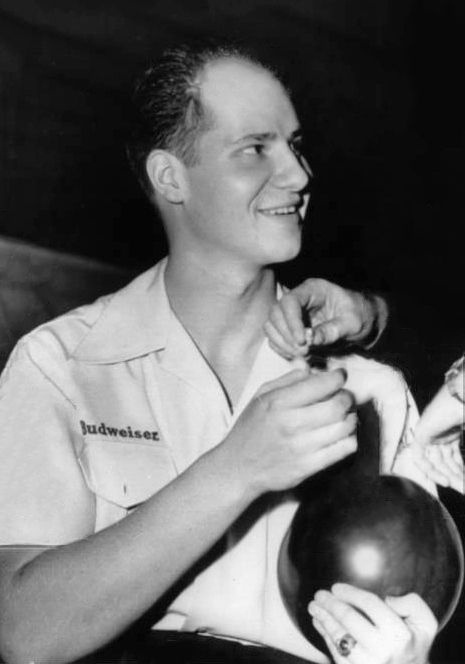
- Welu in 1955

Personal information
- Born: July 3, 1932 St. Louis, Missouri, U.S.
- Died: May 16, 1974 (aged 41) Houston, Texas, U.S.
- Occupations: Ten-pin bowler sportscaster
- Years active: 1951−1974
- Height: 192 cm (6 ft 4 in)

Bowling Information
- Affiliation: PBA
- Rookie year: 1958
- Dominant hand: Right (stroker delivery)
- Wins: 4 PBA Tour (2 majors
- Sponsors: AMF Bowling

William Joseph Welu (July 3, 1932 – May 16, 1974) was an American professional bowler, executive for the Professional Bowlers Association (PBA), bowling broadcaster, and ambassador for the sport. A founding member of the PBA in 1958, he won four PBA titles, including two USBC Masters (then known as the American Bowling Congress) championships. He was only the second bowler in history to successfully defend a United States Bowling Congress Masters title, winning the event in 1964 and 1965 to join Dick Hoover (1956–57). The feat was not matched again until Jason Belmonte won back-to-back Masters titles in 2013–14.

Welu was born to Frank Joseph Welu (1895–1983) and Gertrude Mary Welu (1896–1964); he had a sister Patricia. He graduated from St. Thomas University and later received a master's degree in education from Saint Louis University. He played for the short-lived National Bowling League (NBL) in 1961–1962. Aside from his two Masters titles, Welu won the 1959 BPAA All-Star (predecessor to the U.S. Open), four ABC championships, and two other PBA titles. He was named an All-American seven times. A 1999 edition of Bowlers Journal ranked him No. 22 among the greatest bowlers of 20th century.

Known for his folksy Midwestern speech pattern and easygoing personality, Welu spent several years as an analyst alongside broadcaster Chris Schenkel on ABC's Saturday afternoon telecasts of the Professional Bowlers Tour. He was posthumously inducted into the PBA Hall of Fame in 1975.

== Death ==
Welu's suicide by an intentional Pentobarbital overdose (widely reported as a heart attack) at age 41 in 1974 took a major toll on his close friend Schenkel, prompted ABC to find a new color commentator to join Schenkel in the booth. This was during a time when bowling was wildly popular and garnered very high ratings on television.

Dick Weber and Dave Davis alternated telecasts for a brief period until Nelson Burton Jr. was selected as a permanent replacement for Welu. Nelson and Chris spent nearly 23 years together calling the action for ABC Sports until Schenkel's retirement in 1997.

== PBA Memorial Scholarship ==
The Professional Bowlers Association offers the Billy Welu Memorial Scholarship for college bowlers.
