= Professional Bowlers Association =

American sports organization

- Abbreviation: PBA
- Formation: 1958
- Headquarters: Mechanicsville, Virginia, U.S.
- Region served: Worldwide
- Members: 3,000+ representing 30 countries
- PBA Commissioner: Tom Clark
- Parent organization: Lucky Strike Entertainment Corporation
- Staff: 18
- Website: www.pba.com

The Professional Bowlers Association (PBA) is the major sanctioning body for the sport of professional ten-pin bowling in the United States. Headquartered in Mechanicsville, Virginia, and owned by the Lucky Strike Entertainment Corporation since 2019, the PBA's membership consists of over 3,000 members worldwide. The membership primarily consists of bowling players at multiple levels (PBA Regional Tour, PBA Tour, PBA50 Tour, international PBA tours), and also includes some "pro shop" owners and workers and teaching professionals.

The PBA is currently led by CEO Peter Murray and Commissioner Tom Clark.

== Overview ==
As published on PBA.com: "The Professional Bowlers Association (PBA) is the world's preeminent organization dedicated to the sport of bowling and its professional competition, with thousands of members and millions of fans throughout the world. The PBA plays host to bowling's biggest tournaments, including the PBA Tour, PBA Regional Tour and PBA50 Tour. The PBA has launched ... The PBA League Bowler Certification program. This program provides league bowlers access to statistics, digital awards, rules and regulations, and new tournaments, including The PBA LBC National Championships. Other PBA membership programs include PBA Pinsiders, a membership program for the sport's most enthusiastic fans, and PBA Jr., a club for elite youth bowlers under the age of 17."

The PBA also oversees competition between professional bowlers via the following tours:

- PBA Tour – An annual calendar of events, currently running from January to September each year.
- PBA Regional Tour – The majority of PBA members are Regional professionals. The Regional Tour allows PBA members and qualifying amateurs to compete in weekend events. The Tour consists of seven regions: Central, East, Midwest, Northwest, South, Southwest, and West.
- PBA50/60 Tours – Originally the PBA Senior Tour, it was split in 2013 and now based on age. Set up like the PBA Tour, but allowing PBA members aged 50 years and older, and after the 2013 rebranding, a different tour for members 60 years and older, to compete in their own events. The PBA50/60 Tours also have Regional events. USBC sanctioned events on the PBA50 Tour are still branded as "Senior", and PBA60 Tour events are branded "Super Senior".
- PBA-World Bowling Tour (WBT) – Events outside of North America that award a PBA Tour title if won by a PBA member.
- PBA Women's Regional Tour
- PBA Women's Series (inactive) – Selected PBA Tour events that ran from 2007 to 2010 included a concurrent, separate event for female professionals.
- PBA Jr. – Launched in 2020 as a club for youth bowlers (age 17 and under) to enjoy PBA perks and compete in Regional events with the goal of qualifying for SMART scholarship earnings at the PBA Jr. National Championship.

== History ==
=== 20th century ===
Prior to the PBA's inception, team bowling was prevalent and national tournaments such as the BPAA All-Star (began in 1942) and ABC Masters (began in 1951) attracted many of the best bowlers. Bowling was broadcast on television sporadically beginning in the early 1950s. NBC began with an early 1950s special telecast entitled Championship Bowling. Later, regular weekly bowling shows, including Jackpot Bowling began airing nationally.

At the same time, there was a desire to start a professional bowling division in the United States; an effort led by Eddie Elias, a lawyer and sports agent based in Akron, Ohio. During the 1958 ABC (American Bowling Congress) tournament in Syracuse, New York, sixty men, including Don Carter, Patrick Gentempo (VP A.M.F.), Frank Esposito, Buzz Fazio, Matt Lebhar, Carmen Salvino, Billy Welu, Glenn Allison, Steve Nagy, Harry Smith, Ray Bluth, Dick Hoover, Bill Bunetta, Robert "Bobby" Bellew, Vito Quercia, and Junie McMahon, attended a presentation by Elias. After listening to his proposal, thirty-three of the men donated $50 each, totaling $1,650 to start the organization, which was incorporated in 1958, and headquartered in Akron. The investors then became charter members of the PBA, basically giving them lifetime membership. Bill Bunetta was slated to be the first commissioner of the PBA by Eddie Elias, but Bill was still a very active bowler and turned down the position to continue his bowling and teaching career.

Competition began in 1959 with three tournaments. Italian-born Lou Campi of Dumont, New Jersey won the first event (the Empire State Open), and Dick Weber won the other two (Paramus Eastern Open and the Dayton Open).

The PBA Tour slowly built an audience, expanding to seven tournaments in 1960, then 13 tournaments in 1961, before exploding with 30 tour stops in 1962. Weber would become the first "face" of the PBA in the early years, as he won 10 of the first 23 events held, including seven in 1961 alone.

While PBA bowlers regularly appeared on Jackpot Bowling, Elias led an effort to give the PBA a permanent home on television. It first did so with the interstitial Make That Spare on ABC Sports, which ran from 1960 to 1964. In 1961, ABC's Wide World of Sports aired the PBA National Invitational, from Paramus, New Jersey.

This would prompt ABC Sports into having a separate series, called the Professional Bowlers Tour, which ABC aired from 1962 to 1997. The program became a staple of Saturday afternoon television, as a lead-in to Wide World of Sports. Coupled with the continued support of its charter members, as well as sponsorships by the Ford Motor Company, Coca-Cola (which sponsored 11 tournaments in 1963 alone), True Value Hardware and Firestone Tire, the PBA experienced growth in its tournament schedules and prize funds. Annual incomes for professional bowlers became, at the time, very competitive with other professional sports. A Sports Illustrated article from 1963 noted that top bowler Harry Smith stood to make as much money in 1963 as Major League Baseball's NL MVP Sandy Koufax and NFL Football MVP Y. A. Tittle combined.

Schedules reached a plateau of 35 tournaments per year in the late 1970s and into the 1980s. The 1965 Firestone Tournament of Champions was the first to offer $100,000 in prize money (including a then-record $25,000 first prize); the 1982 event featured a $200,000 purse, and the 1987 U.S. Open, sponsored by Seagram distillery, offered a $500,000 prize fund as well as the first $100,000 first-place prize in PBA history.

By the 1980s, True Value pledged $100,000 to any roller of a perfect game on national television (increased to a $200,000 sum during its own True Value Open). Prior to this, the PBA would award a televised 300 game with $10,000 and, in some seasons, a new Ford or Mercury automobile. In addition, in the early 1990s the Miller Brewing Company offered $1 million to any bowler who could win all three of its sponsored tournaments in a given season.

As television exposure increased for the PBA, it spun off a PBA Senior Tour in 1981, with Bill Beach winning the first seniors' championship that year. Having been renamed the PBA50 Tour in 2013, the senior bowling tour continues to the present day.

From 1984 to 1991, NBC Sports aired the PBA fall tour events.

In 1986, a group of professional bowlers who were dissatisfied with PBA management formed the Touring Pro Bowlers (TPB) group. After meeting resistance, the TPB took on the PBA in an antitrust suit. Though settled out of court, the lawsuit did serious financial damage to the PBA.

By the late 1990s, television audiences for the PBA Tour had waned in the wake of cable television's explosion and the variety of sports viewing choices now offered, particularly college football on Saturday afternoons. The Professional Bowlers Tour ended its 36-year run on ABC with a final broadcast on June 21, 1997. CBS and Fox Sports Net would carry PBA events until ESPN gained exclusive broadcast rights in 2001.

Elias continued to be involved in the PBA until his death in 1998.

=== 21st century ===
The PBA was purchased in March 2000 by former Microsoft executives Chris Peters (chairman), Rob Glaser, and Mike Slade, and its corporate headquarters were moved to Seattle, Washington. Together with CEO Steve Miller, a former Nike executive, they are recognized for rescuing the PBA from the brink of extinction. Fred Schreyer took over for Miller in 2005 in the dual role of CEO and Commissioner. In 2011, the position was split. Geoff Reiss was appointed as the PBA's CEO and Tom Clark as PBA Commissioner.

The PBA was featured in the 2006 sports documentary, A League of Ordinary Gentlemen. The documentary, filmed during the 2002–2003 season, enjoyed a limited release in theaters before being released in a DVD format in March 2006. The PBA was also featured and acknowledged in the 2007 film 7-10 Split.

In 2003, the PWBA (Professional Women's Bowling Association) folded, and the PBA began allowing female members in 2004. Missy Bellinder (Parkin) became the first female PBA member, while Liz Johnson became the first to cash in a PBA Tour event and later (2005) the first to make a PBA Tour telecast. In conjunction with the USBC, the PBA would later inaugurate the PBA Women's Series in 2007. Following ESPN telecasts of the U.S. Women's Open, it brought back semi-regular women's bowling telecasts for the first time since the demise of the PWBA. The top two seeds out of a field of sixteen faced each other in one match, aired prior to the men's championship match. The Women's Series expanded from four events in 2007 to eight events in the 2008–09 and 2009–10 seasons, before being canceled. The PWBA itself would subsequently return in 2015.

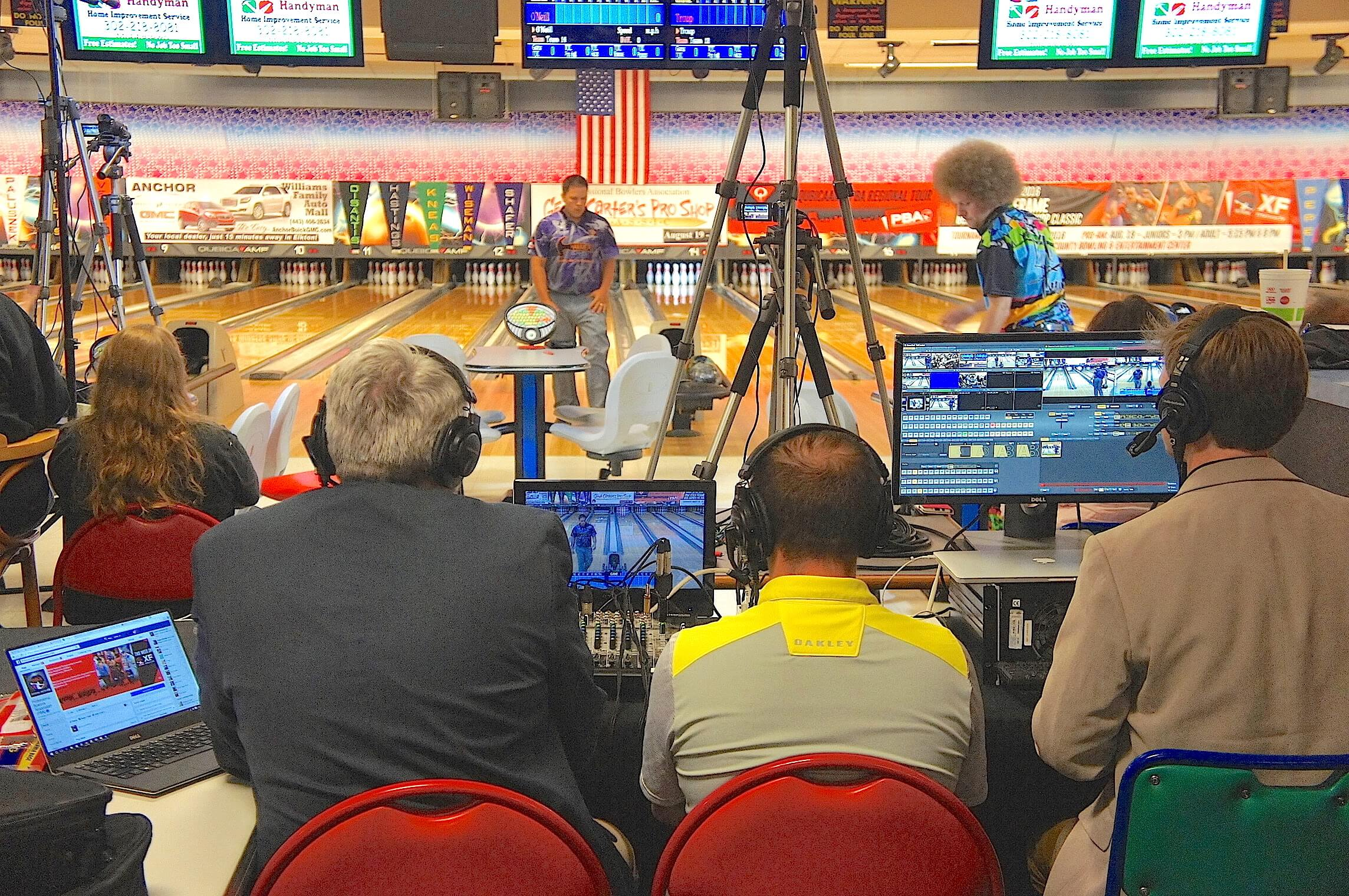
A PBA "Xtra Frame" tournament broadcast setup

In 2009, financial difficulties and the general state of the U.S. economy caused the tour to reduce the number of tour stops and overall events, while also reducing the number of live TV finals broadcasts. The PBA combined its fall schedule of six standard PBA tournaments (plus qualifying for the PBA World Championship) into a single World Series of Bowling event, held that year in Allen Park, Michigan near Detroit. All fall TV finals except the PBA World Championship were taped and aired at a later date on ESPN, while all but one of the winter tour events continued to hold live TV finals. In 2010, the World Series of Bowling was moved to Las Vegas, Nevada, and consisted of five tournaments with taped TV finals and qualifying for the PBA World Championship. The overall schedule that season was reduced to just 12 title events, with portions of three winter season events being taped and aired after the fact. Kelly Kulick won the 2010 Tournament of Champions, where she was the first-ever female competitor in the field. This also made her the first woman to win any Professional Bowlers Association Tour event that was also open to men.

For the 2011–12 season, a total of 14 TV broadcasts were taped at the 2011 World Series of Bowling in Las Vegas to be aired on later dates. For the first time, the TV finals for the PBA World Championship did not air live. In fact, ESPN only aired the finals of the PBA's three remaining major tournaments (USBC Masters, U.S. Open and Tournament of Champions) in a live 2012 broadcast. All other ESPN broadcasts for Winter 2012 were taped events from the World Series, while four additional non-major title tournaments were available live via the PBA's "Xtra Frame" webcast service.

Along with reduced stops, prize funds for some standard tournaments were reduced, starting in 2010, with as little as $15,000 going to the winner. The 2011 Tournament of Champions, however, did offer a PBA-record $1 million prize fund and an unprecedented $250,000 top prize.

In January 2013, the PBA League, consisting of eight teams of five professional bowlers each, held its first event.

On the eve of the PBA Tour's 60th season (2018), the PBA provided some statistics on the history of the Tour and its bowlers:

- Over 10,000 bowlers have held PBA membership since the organization's founding in 1958.
- As of September 1, 2017, 345 different bowlers have won a PBA Tour title.
- Among the 345 winners, 124 (35.9%) won only one title in their career, while 51 bowlers (15.6%) have earned 10 or more titles.

On September 10, 2019, Bowlero Corporation, the world's largest operator of bowling centers, announced it had purchased the PBA. Bowlero's Chief Customer Officer, Colie Edison, was appointed CEO of the PBA. Bowlero announced that current PBA Commissioner Tom Clark will continue in that role. In January 2022, Colie Edison stepped down as CEO to become Chief Growth Officer for the WNBA.

Beginning with the 2019 PBA Tour season, television coverage moved from ESPN to Fox Sports, with 26 broadcasts being held on Fox Sports 1 and four broadcasts on terrestrial Fox stations. CBS Sports Network continues to broadcast the PBA Tour Finals, as it has since the event's inception in 2017. In August 2023, the PBA and Fox agreed on a two-year extension of their broadcast partnership through the 2025 season.

On April 30, 2025, the PBA announced it had entered into a multi-year agreement with The CW network to air ten PBA events on consecutive Sunday afternoons, beginning in the 2026 season. CBS networks were awarded eight telecasts, including all five events of PBA World Series of Bowling XVII.

On January 28, 2026, the PBA and Lucky Strike Entertainment announced that Peter Murray had been appointed as CEO and Head of Media for the PBA. The CEO position had been vacant since the departure of Colie Edison in 2022.

== Most PBA Tour titles ==
The top winner of all-time on the PBA Tour is Walter Ray Williams Jr. with 47 career titles, while Jason Belmonte has won the most major titles with 15. A list of the top PBA Tour titlists can be found in the separate PBA Tour story.

== PBA League ==
The PBA League, which debuted in 2013, is an annual non-title tournament featuring eight teams of six touring PBA players (increased to ten teams in 2020, then reduced back to eight teams in 2024). Teams vie for a cash prize ($100,000 for first place in 2024) and the Elias Cup trophy. It has been held at Bayside Bowl in Portland, Maine since 2015, except for the 2020 season when it was contested with no audience in Centreville, Virginia due to the COVID-19 pandemic.

An open draft was held to fill all teams for the inaugural 2013 event. Following that event, team managers have been allowed to protect up to three players from their current roster each season, with the remaining spots being filled via the draft.

Teams compete in Baker-style matches, with five players per side. The player bowling in frame one also bowls frame six, the player bowling the second frame also bowls the seventh frame, and so on. Each team currently has a sixth player that they can substitute for one player at any time during a match, or swap out for a player at the start of a new match.

In the 2024 season, the league was renamed PBA Elite League and ran season-long qualifying events to determine seeding for the final rounds in September. The teams bowled round-robin matches concurrently with the PBA's first 14 tour stops, each team facing the other teams twice. The lowest two teams in win-loss record were eliminated, with six teams advancing to the final rounds.

In the 2025 season, the league was renamed "PBA Elite League: Battle of the Brands" and featured 8 teams representing bowling ball manufacturers: Brunswick, DV8, Ebonite, Storm, 900 Global, Roto Grip, Hammer, and MOTIV. Team managers selected up to 5 players to represent the team at each standard event through the Tournament of Champions, and players earned points based on standings. In the postseason, teams were seeded in an eight-team stepladder based on cumulative scores. The title match was a "race to two points" final, and, on April 27, Storm defeated MOTIV 2–0 to claim the Manufacturer's Cup. The Battle of the Brands continues into 2026, albeit with six teams instead of eight (Brunswick, Hammer, Storm, Roto Grip, 900 Global and MOTIV).

=== Teams ===
Team	Manager	Elias Cup Titles	Runners up	Former names	Founded
GoBowling Dallas Strikers	Norm Duke	2	1		2013
Bowlero LA X	Jason Belmonte	0	3		2013
Las Vegas High Rollers	Amleto Monacelli	1	1		2020
Motown Muscle	Jason Couch	0	1		2013
New Jersey Kingpins	Carolyn Dorin-Ballard & Del Ballard Jr.	1	1	NYC Kingpins	2013
Portland Lumberjacks	Tim Mack	3	3	Pittsburgh Jack Rabbits (2013–2015)	2013
Akron Atom Splitters	Mark Baker	3	0	Silver Lake Atom Splitters (2013–2023)	2013
Snickers Waco Wonders	Johnny Petraglia	1	0	BROOKLYN STyLES (2013–2020)	2013

=== Elias Cup champions ===
==== By year ====
Year	Winner	Runner up
2013	NYC Kingpins	Motown Muscle
2014	Silver Lake Atom Splitters	LA X
2015	Silver Lake Atom Splitters	LA X
2016	Dallas Strikers	NYC Kingpins
2017	Dallas Strikers	Portland Lumberjacks
2018	Silver Lake Atom Splitters	Philadelphia Hitmen
2019	Portland Lumberjacks	LA X
2020	Portland Lumberjacks	Las Vegas High Rollers
2021	Not Held	
2022	Portland Lumberjacks	Dallas Strikers
2023	Waco Wonders	Portland Lumberjacks
2024	Las Vegas High Rollers	Portland Lumberjacks

=== Mark Roth League MVP award winners ===
Year	Winner	Team
2013	Not awarded	–
2014	Chris Barnes	Silver Lake Atom Splitters
2015	Dick Allen	Silver Lake Atom Splitters
2016	Tommy Jones	Dallas Strikers
2017	Norm Duke	Dallas Strikers
2018	Chris Barnes	Silver Lake Atom Splitters
2019	Wes Malott	Portland Lumberjacks
2020	Wes Malott	Portland Lumberjacks
2021	Not held	–
2022	Kyle Troup	Portland Lumberjacks
2023	Ryan Ciminelli	Waco Wonders
2024	Andrew Anderson	Las Vegas High Rollers

=== PBA Elite League Battle of the Brands winners ===
Year	Winner	Runner-up
2025	Team Storm	Team MOTIV
2026	Team Storm	Team MOTIV

== Hall of Fame ==
The PBA Hall of Fame was founded in 1975 with eight initial inductees: six for Performance (Ray Bluth, Don Carter, Carmen Salvino, Harry Smith, Dick Weber and Billy Welu) and two for Meritorious Service (Frank Esposito and Chuck Pezzano). Since its inception, it was located at the International Bowling Museum and Hall of Fame in St. Louis, Missouri. It is now part of the new USBC headquarters in Arlington, Texas.

Through 2026, there are 126 PBA Hall of Fame members in four categories:

- Superior Performance (61)
- Meritorious Service (44)
- Veterans/Senior (20)
- Pioneer (1)

Membership in the Hall of Fame was originally determined by annual elections. From 2000 to 2008, those in the Performance category had to have ten PBA titles (or two major championships) on their resume, as well as be retired from the tour for five years.

Another revision took effect in 2008. Bowlers can now qualify for the Hall of Fame based on five PBA titles on their resume, as long as two of those titles were major championships. Other active bowlers can now qualify for the Hall as well if they have 20 years of membership and are elected.

Late in 2008, The PBA announced the launch of a new PBA Seniors Hall of Fame. John Handegard, the all-time leader in PBA Senior titles at the time (14) became the first inductee on January 24, 2009.

In 2025, George Branham III became the first inductee in the new Pioneer category.
