= Eddie Elias =

American sports executive (1928–1998)

- Born: December 12, 1928; Akron, Ohio, USA
- Died: November 12, 1998 (aged 69)
- Other names: Edward G. Elias
- Education: West High School, University of Akron, Western Reserve Law School (now part of Case Western Reserve University)
- Occupation: professional bowler
- Spouse: Peggy Emerson (m.1968)
- Children: two daughters: Rainy Margaret (1971), Annie Marlo (1974)

Edward G. Elias (December 12, 1928 – November 15, 1998) was best known as the founder of the Professional Bowlers Association (PBA).

Elias grew up in the Akron, Ohio, United States area, and attended West High School, The University of Akron, Western Reserve Law School (now part of Case Western Reserve University). He was active in numerous sports during his high school and college years, including baseball and basketball.

Although Elias was not a bowler himself, in 1958 he founded the Professional Bowlers Association with 33 founding members and turned the sport into one of the longest continuing sports series on network TV. He was elected to the PBA Hall of Fame in 1976 for Meritorious Service. He remained involved in the PBA until his death in 1998. In 2013, the PBA began a PBA League team tournament that awards the Elias Cup to the champion.

As an agent Elias, through his company Eddie Elias Enterprises, represented almost two dozen golfers in addition to basketball, football, bowling and auto racing stars, and numerous television personalities and sports commentators. The firm's clients included golfers Chi Chi Rodriguez and Fuzzy Zoeller, bowlers Dick Weber and Don Carter, consumer advocate Ralph Nader, and television stars Phil Donahue and Marlo Thomas.

He married Peggy Emerson on November 21, 1968, in New York City. Their daughter Rainy Margaret was born on July 26, 1971. Their daughter Annie Marlo was born on December 25, 1974.

== Bibliography ==
- Eddie Elias: PBA Founder Merchandised Sports, Corporate, TV Worlds, by Jane Richardson, ISBN 1-879403-17-X.
