= Dick Weber =

American professional ten-pin bowler (1929–2005)

- Dick Weber, pro staffer of AMF

Personal information
- Born: Richard Anthony Weber; December 23, 1929 Indianapolis, Indiana, USA
- Died: February 14, 2005 (aged 75) Florissant, Missouri, USA
- Years active: 1958–1992

Bowling Information
- Affiliation: PBA
- Rookie year: 1959
- Dominant hand: Right (stroker delivery)
- Wins: 30 PBA Tour (4 majors); 6 PBA Senior Tour (now known as PBA50)
- Sponsors: AMF Bowling

Richard Anthony Weber (December 23, 1929 – February 14, 2005) was an American professional bowler and founding member of the Professional Bowlers Association (PBA). Along with Don Carter, Weber is widely regarded as professional bowling's first superstar. He was the first player in history to earn 30 PBA Tour titles, a level reached by only seven other players since.

== Career ==
Weber made his first bowling headlines during the early 1950s, while working as a mailman in his native Indianapolis. In 1955 he moved to Florissant, Missouri to join the bowling team named the Budweisers (after the popular American beer brand). The team established a long-standing 5-man ABC league series record on March 12, 1958, at the National Team Match Games at Floriss Lanes in St. Louis, Missouri by toppling 3,858 pins with 136 strikes (43 in games 1 & 3 and 50 in game 2). This broke the previous ABC record for a 5-man team of 3,797 set in 1937. Weber himself rolled games of 258, 258 and 259 on the record-setting day for a 775 series. The Budweisers' record wasn't broken until 1994.

In 1958, Weber became a founding member of the Professional Bowlers Association, which he subsequently dominated. Weber captured his first PBA title in the second tournament of the inaugural 1959 season, and won three of the PBA's first four tournaments.

He went on to win 10 of the first 23 PBA tournaments, including winning seven titles in the 13-event 1961 PBA season. Only Mark Roth has won more titles in a PBA season with eight victories in 1978, but Roth's feat was accomplished over a 35-event season. Early television audiences were treated to Weber's smooth, repeatable stroke. Weber's scoring came from accuracy, touch and lane reading, rather than from an explosive hook.

During his career, Weber won titles in 30 PBA Tour events, including four major titles. All of his major titles were earned in the BPAA All-Star, which later became the U.S. Open. Weber won this tournament four times in a five-year span (1962, '63, '65 and '66). He was twice runner-up in the Firestone Tournament of Champions (1965 and 1966). He earned his final PBA Tour title at age 47 in the 1977 King Louie Open. He went on to capture six PBA Senior Tour events, amassing a total of 36 PBA titles in both categories.

He was PBA Player of the Year in 1965, and earned BPAA National Bowler of the Year honors three times (in 1961, 1963 and 1965). He was named an All-American ten times, and in 1999 was ranked #2 bowler of the 20th Century by Bowlers Journal, behind only Earl Anthony. In 2002 Weber also became the first player to win at least one PBA title in six decades (counting PBA Senior events).

Despite already being 29 years old when the first PBA tournament took place in 1959, Weber managed to cash over $930,000 in career PBA earnings. He also enjoyed a decades-long sponsorship agreement with AMF bowling.

League bowling in the United States had its heyday in the 1960s and early 1970s, partly due to the influence of pros like Weber and Don Carter. Several PBA pros like Johnny Petraglia claimed to be inspired by Dick Weber: "The main reason I went on Tour was Dick Weber. When I was 14, I saw him do an exhibition in Madison Square Garden. When I left I remember saying to myself: 'I know what I want to do now; I want to be like Dick Weber.'"

Both Weber and his son Pete are members of the United States Bowling Congress Hall of Fame and the PBA Hall of Fame. When Pete won his first PBA title in 1982, it marked the first time in history that a father and son had both won PBA Tour titles. The feat has since been matched by Don and Jimmy Johnson, Don and Eugene McCune, Guppy and Kyle Troup, and Eugene and Kevin McCune. Dick and Pete are the only pair with both father and son ranked in the top ten for PBA titles. Pete would also break his father's PBA-era record of four U.S. Open titles, winning his fifth U.S. Open in 2012.

In 1999, Dick Weber was inducted into the St. Louis Walk of Fame. The PBA ranked him 3rd on its 2008 list of "50 Greatest Players of the Last 50 Years." Only all-time titles leaders Earl Anthony and Walter Ray Williams, Jr. ranked higher.

=== PBA Tour titles ===
Major titles in bold text.

1. 1959 Paramus Eastern PBA Open (Paramus, NJ)
2. 1959 Dayton PBA Open (Dayton, OH)
3. 1960 Empire State PBA Open (Albany, NY)
4. 1961 All-American Classic (Dallas, TX)
5. 1961 Shreveport PBA Open (Shreveport, LA)
6. 1961 Fred Magee Open (Houston, TX)
7. 1961 Western Regional PBA Open (Redondo Beach, CA)
8. 1961 San Jose PBA Open (San Jose, CA)
9. 1961 Benesch PBA Open (Argo, IL)
10. 1961 Puerto Rico Invitational (Río Piedras, Puerto Rico)
11. **1962 BPAA All-Star** (Miami Beach, FL)
12. 1963 New Jersey PBA Open (North Brunswick, NJ)
13. 1963 Las Vegas PBA Open (Las Vegas, NV)
14. **1963 BPAA All-Star** (Kansas City, MO)
15. 1964 Dallas Home Furniture Open (Dallas, TX)
16. 1965 Thunderbird PBA Open (Wichita, KS)
17. 1965 Houston PBA Open (Houston, TX)
18. **1965 BPAA All-Star** (Philadelphia, PA)
19. 1966 Denver Open (Denver, CO)
20. 1966 Fresno Open (Fresno, CA)
21. **1966 BPAA All-Star** (Lansing, MI)
22. 1969 New Orleans Lions Open (New Orleans, LA)
23. 1969 Altoona Jaycee Open (Altoona, PA)
24. 1970 3rd Annual Hawaiian Invitational (Hawaii)
25. 1971 Denver Open (Denver, CO)
26. 1971 Buckeye Open (Toledo, OH)
27. 1971 Hawaiian Invitational (Honolulu, HI)
28. 1973 Ebonite Open (Toledo, OH)
29. 1976 AMF Pro Classic (Garden City, NY)
30. 1977 King Louie Open (Overland Park, KS)

== Personal life ==
Weber was also known as a tireless ambassador of his sport, and rarely passed up an opportunity to promote it. One promotion had him bowling the highest (altitude) game ever in "Operation AstroBowl," which took place on a Boeing 707 on January 7, 1964. This was a joint campaign for American Airlines' Cargo Service. The aircraft used was an all-cargo Boeing 707 with a single AMF lane installed in the main cargo hold. The flight was from New York to Dallas. Weber also appeared several times on Late Show with David Letterman.

On February 14, 2005, Richard Anthony Weber died in Florissant, Missouri, at age 75. On the day of his death, Weber had just returned from a United States Bowling Congress (USBC) meeting in Baton Rouge, Louisiana. He showed no prior sign of ill-health but experienced serious breathing problems that evening and paramedics were unable to revive him. The underlying cause of death was not known, but was ultimately due to respiratory failure. Dick Weber was survived by his wife Juanita, one daughter Paula, and three sons including the aforementioned Pete, also a successful professional bowler, and Richard Jr., "John" Weber who became a PBA employee and served in various positions for the PBA Regional Tour, PBA50 Tour and PBA Tour. On April 27, 2024, John became the third member of the Weber family to be inducted into the PBA Hall of Fame, being honored for Meritorious Service.

His wife Juanita Weber, also an avid bowler who once won a state championship, died on April 13, 2020, at the age of 89.

== Media presence and legacy ==
The Weber Cup, named after Dick, is a Ryder Cup-style event that pits European and American ten-pin bowlers against one another. It is held annually in England. From 2008 to 2010, the PBA had a tour stop named the Dick Weber Open. In 2011, the PBA named its all-new playoff series the Dick Weber PBA Playoffs.

"He was the greatest ambassador in the history of the game. Everybody liked Dick Weber, even the guy he was beating. Like (Arnold) Palmer, he's the one who got everyone interested in his sport."

— PBA Commissioner Tom Clark in 2016.

On April 17, 2006, the inaugural Dick Weber Tribute was held in St. Louis. Organized by Bill McCorkle, the event attracted many of bowling's top luminaries. The event was attended by over 20 members of the Weber family, representing four generations, as well as over 50 professional bowlers, including champions and members of the Hall of Fame. The highlight of the evening came when Pete Weber delivered a moving tribute. Many in the audience had never seen this side of him before.

A documentary on the life and fame of Dick Weber was released on March 23, 2007, by Live Technologies, Inc. and Bill McCorkle. It consists of interviews with many current and former professional bowlers, family, and sportscasters as well as footage covering Weber's 60-year history as a professional athlete.

Said all-time PBA major titles leader Jason Belmonte in 2026, "The Weber name, it is bowling. I have a lot of respect for the Weber name."

Weber's legacy also lives on through the Bowling Proprietors Association of America (BPAA), which began giving out an annual BPAA Dick Weber Bowling Ambassador award in 2006 (won that year by Dick Ritger). The most recent award winner was Larry Nowak in 2025. Also, the PBA50 Dick Weber Sportsmanship Award is given annually to the "senior tour" player that best represents Weber's class, character and humility during a given season.
