= 2021 PBA Tour season =

- League: Professional Bowlers Association
- Sport: Ten-pin bowling
- Duration: January 14 – August 22

PBA Tour
- Season MVP: Kyle Troup

PBA Tour seasons
- ← 2020 2022 →

The 2021 PBA Tour season, the 62nd season of play for the U.S. Professional Bowlers Association's ten-pin bowling tour, began on January 14 with the Regional Portions of the PBA Players Championship. The season included 14 singles title events and two doubles title events.

The 2021 season has featured three televised perfect 300 games, the 30th, 31st and 32nd in PBA Tour history. The first was accomplished by Chris Via (February 7, PBA Players Championship East Region finals) and the second by Sam Cooley (May 16, PBA Tour Playoffs). Via then rolled his second 300 game of the season on June 27 at the PBA Tour Finals, joining Sean Rash and François Lavoie as the only players in history with two televised 300 games in PBA Tour title events.

This season has also seen the fourth-ever 7–10 split conversion in a televised PBA Tour event (and first since 1991), accomplished by 18-year old rookie Anthony Neuer in the semifinal match of the U.S. Open.

Kyle Troup has set the PBA's single-season earnings record this season, with $496,900. The previous record holder was Walter Ray Williams Jr., who earned $419,700 in the 2002–03 season.

== Season overview ==
The PBA announced it would open the 2021 season with a revamped and expanded PBA Players Championship that opens up the event to a broader portion of the PBA membership. Five Regional events (West, Southwest, Central, South and East) were hosted first. After 28 qualifying games (7 games on each of four different oil patterns), each Region held its own stepladder finals broadcast on FS1. The five Regional winners then competed in the tournament finals held in Jupiter, Florida on February 21, which was broadcast live on Fox. The Regional concept was introduced, in part, due to travel restrictions that have resulted from the continuing COVID-19 pandemic, and will allow most PBA professionals to compete in safe events closer to home. In addition, the 2021 PBA Players Championship featured a $1 million prize fund, with a PBA record-tying $250,000 first place prize.

The PBA Tournament of Champions took place February 23–28, also in Jupiter, Florida (following the conclusion of the PBA Players Championship finals in the same location). The PBA then moved to Tampa, Florida for World Series of Bowling (WSOB) XII. WSOB XII featured three animal oil pattern title events (Cheetah, Chameleon, Scorpion), with these three tournaments serving as initial qualifying for the PBA World Championship major. WSOB XII also included the PBA Roth-Holman Doubles Championship. The PBA World Championship finals aired on Saturday afternoon, March 13 on Fox, kicking off five consecutive days of broadcasts. The Roth-Holman Doubles, Cheetah Championship, Chameleon Championship and Scorpion Championship aired March 14–17 on FS1.

The U.S. Open was originally scheduled to take place in Green Bay, Wisconsin while the USBC Masters was to be held in Las Vegas, Nevada. In December 2020, the USBC announced the two events would be held in back-to-back weeks (March 30 through April 11). Both tournaments were held in Reno, Nevada due to COVID-19 continuing to impact USBC operations.

Following the U.S. Open was the PBA Super Slam on April 18, which saw the five PBA major winners vying for a $100,000 first prize. The third annual PBA Tour Playoffs ran from April 24 through May 16. Previous events featured the top 24 players in points through the first 13 events of the season, but due to only nine events being scheduled before the 2021 Playoffs, this season's tournament started with the top 16 players only.

On April 29, the PBA announced the return of the King of the Lanes event, to be held this season on June 19 & 20 in Portland, Maine. The "last man standing" format will have reigning king Kris Prather returning, with a mix of veteran and current players looking to gain the throne over the five rounds. The challengers include: Chris Barnes, AJ Johnson, Jesper Svensson, Parker Bohn III, Chris Via, Anthony Neuer, Tim Mack, Jason Sterner, Tom Daugherty and François Lavoie. The PBA member event will be preceded by an all-women's event, the PBA King of the Lanes: Empress Edition, on June 15 & 16. (In the 2020 PBA King of the Lanes, two females – Clara Guerrero and Gazmine Mason – participated against an otherwise all-male field.) This marked the first PBA event to have a live audience since February 2020.

The PBA Tour Finals, featuring the top eight points earners since the start of the 2020 season, was held June 26–27 in Allen Park, Michigan, with all rounds airing live on CBS Sports Network.

In May, the PBA finalized scheduling for five Summer Tour events, beginning with the Lubbock Sports Open on July 23–25 and concluding with the Chesapeake Open on August 20–22. All events awarded a PBA title, Tier 3 Tour points and a minimum $10,000 winner's share, with a $40,000 bonus pool up for grabs based on combined points over the five stops. The top points earner (Darren Tang) won a $20,000 bonus, with smaller amounts awarded to the second through tenth place finishers.

== Season awards ==
- Chris Schenkel PBA Player of the Year: Kyle Troup
- Harry Smith PBA Points Leader: Kyle Troup
- Harry Golden PBA Rookie of the Year: Matt Russo
- PBA Steve Nagy Sportsmanship Award: Jake Peters
- PBA Tony Reyes Community Service Award: Warren Eales

== Tournament summary ==
The events for the 2021 PBA tournament schedule are shown below. Major tournaments are in bold. Career PBA title numbers for winners are shown in parentheses (#). Winner's share prize money is shown in US dollars ($), except where indicated.

Tour points are awarded for most events. Besides the season-ending Harry Smith PBA Points Winner award, points are one consideration for Player of the Year voting, and also affect eligibility for the PBA Tour Playoffs and PBA Tour Finals (combined with 2020 points). Points for tournaments are awarded differently based on a "tier" system. The tier of each qualifying tournament is shown in the Notes column on the tournament schedule, and is explained below.

- Tier 3: PBA short format or limited field tournaments (2500 points for first, and descending thereafter)
- Tier 2: PBA standard tournaments with a fully open field (double the points of Tier 3 events)
- Tier 1: PBA major tournaments (triple the points of Tier 3 events)

Event	Airdate	City	Preliminary rounds	Final round	Oil pattern	Winner	Notes
**PBA Players Championship**	West Region Finals: Jan 24 FS1 (220,000 viewers); Southwest Region Finals: Jan 31 FS1 (287,000 viewers); Central Region Finals: Feb 6 FS1 (209,000 viewers); East Region Finals: Feb 7 FS1 (208,000 viewers); South Region Finals: Feb 14 FS1 (328,000 viewers); Championship Finals: Feb 21 Fox (958,000 viewers)	Phoenix, AZ; Garland, TX; Milwaukee, WI; Richmond, VA; Tampa, FL; Jupiter, FL	Jan 14–17 (all regions)	Live	Qualifying: Viper 36, Bear 41, Chameleon 39, Shark 48; Regional & tournament finals: Don Carter 39	Kyle Troup, USA (7)	Open PBA members-only event (Tier 1). PBA major. Five Regional winners (Anthony Simonsen, François Lavoie, Tom Smallwood, Kyle Troup, Dick Allen) compete on February 21 for a $250,000 top prize.
**Kia PBA Tournament of Champions**	Feb 28 Fox (865,000 viewers)	Jupiter, FL	Feb 23–26 (PTQ: Feb 22)	Live	Don Johnson 40	François Lavoie, Canada (5)	Invitational event (Tier 1), limited to 64 PBA titlists. PBA major. PBA Tour champions fill up to 58 entries. PBA players with Regional titles only bowl in the PTQ to fill a minimum of 6 entries. $100,000 top prize.
**PBA Guaranteed Rate World Championship**	Mar 13 Fox (456,000 viewers)	Tampa, FL	Mar 7–11	Live	Qualifying: Cheetah 33, Chameleon 39, Scorpion 42; Cashers round thru finals: Earl Anthony 43	Tom Daugherty, USA (3)	Open event for WSOB XII participants (Tier 1). PBA major. Top 30 players based on combined Cheetah, Chameleon and Scorpion qualifying pinfall advance to cashers round. $100,000 top prize.
PBA WSOB XII Roth-Holman Doubles Championship	Mar 14 FS1 (254,000 viewers)	Tampa, FL	Mar 7–9, 12	Live	Qualifying: Cheetah 33, Chameleon 39, Scorpion 42; Match Play & Finals: Mark Roth 42 (left lane); Marshall Holman 37 (right lane)	Andrew Anderson, USA (3) & Kris Prather, USA (4)	Open event-limited field (Tier 3). Top 16 teams based on combined Cheetah, Chameleon and Scorpion qualifying pinfall advance to match play on March 12. $30,000 top prize.
PBA WSOB XII Cheetah Championship	Mar 15 FS1	Tampa, FL	Mar 7, 15	Live	Cheetah 33	Sam Cooley, Australia (1)	Open event-short format (Tier 3). $30,000 top prize.
PBA WSOB XII Chameleon Championship	Mar 16 FS1	Tampa, FL	Mar 8, 16	Live	Chameleon 39	Shawn Maldonado, USA (1)	Open event-short format (Tier 3). $30,000 top prize.
PBA WSOB XII Scorpion Championship	Mar 17 FS1	Tampa, FL	Mar 9, 17	Live	Scorpion 42	Tom Daugherty, USA (4)	Open event-short format (Tier 3). $30,000 top prize.
**USBC Masters**	Apr 4 FS1 (249,000 viewers)	Reno, NV	Mar 30 – Apr 3	Live	USBC custom (40 ft.)	Thomas Larsen, Denmark (3)	Open event (Tier 1). PBA major. $30,000 top prize.
**77th U.S. Open**	Apr 11 FS1 (465,000 viewers)	Reno, NV	Apr 6–10 (PTQ: Apr 4)	Live	U.S. Open (4 custom patterns)	Chris Via, USA (1)	Open event (Tier 1). PBA major. $30,000 top prize.
Guaranteed Rate PBA Super Slam	Apr 18 Fox (593,000 viewers)	Annandale, VA	N/A	Live	Mike Aulby 39	François Lavoie, Canada	Non-title event for winners of all 2021 majors. $100,000 top prize.
Kia PBA Tour Playoffs	Round of 16: Apr 24–25 FS1 (227,000 viewers/224,000 viewers); May 1 FS1 (viewers–NA) & May 2 FS1 (406,000 viewers); Quarterfinals: May 9 FS1 (345,000 viewers) & May 10 FS1 (187,000 viewers); Semifinals: May 15 FS1; Finals: May 16 Fox	Milford, CT	Live	Live	Carmen Salvino 44	Kyle Troup, USA (8)	Invitational title event. Starting field includes top 16 players in 2021 season points through the U.S. Open. $100,000 top prize.
PBA King of the Lanes	Jun 19–20 FS1	Portland, ME	Live	Live	Mark Roth 42	Final King: Jason Sterner; Top Casher: Parker Bohn III ($25,000)	Non-title invitational event. Defending King: Kris Prather. Each round pays $10,000 to the King match winner, $5,000 for second, $3,000 for third.
PBA Tour Finals	Jun 26–27 CBS Sports	Allen Park, MI	Live	Live	Marshall Holman 38 & Johnny Petraglia 46	Anthony Simonsen, USA (8)	Invitational title event. Starting field includes Top 8 players in Tour points since start of 2020 season. $30,000 top prize.
PBA Strike Derby	Jul 11 FS1	Portland, ME	N/A	Jun 18	Mark Roth 42	Andrew Anderson, USA	Non-title invitational event. 12 player starting field. $25,000 top prize.
PBA Lubbock Sports Open	Jul 25 FloBowling	Lubbock, TX	Jul 23–24	Live	Carmen Salvino 44	Shawn Maldonado, USA (2)	Open event. Tier 3-short format. $15,000 top prize.
PBA-PWBA Striking Against Breast Cancer Mixed Doubles (a.k.a. The Luci)	Aug 1 FloBowling	Houston, TX	Jul 29–31	Live	Custom Kegel design	E. J. Tackett, USA (14) & Danielle McEwan, USA	Open PBA and PWBA title event. Tier 3-limited field. $20,000 top prize.
PBA FloBowling Jonesboro Open	Aug 8 FloBowling	Jonesboro, AR	Aug 6–7	Live	Marshall Holman 38	Matt Russo, USA (1)	Open event. Tier 3-short format. $10,000 top prize.
PBA FloBowling Bowlerstore.com Classic	Aug 15 FloBowling	Coldwater, OH	Aug 13–14	Live	Bear 41	Darren Tang, USA (1)	Open event. Tier 3-short format. $10,000 top prize.
PBA FloBowling Chesapeake Open	Aug 22 FloBowling	Chesapeake, VA	Aug 20–21	Live	Wolf 32	Sean Rash, USA (17)	Open event. Tier 3-short format. $10,000 top prize.
