= 2026 PBA Tour season =

- League: Professional Bowlers Association
- Sport: Ten-pin bowling
- Duration: February 16–August 31

PBA Tour

PBA Tour seasons
- ← 2025

The 2026 PBA Tour season, the 67th season of play for the U.S. Professional Bowlers Association's ten-pin bowling tour, began on February 16 with the pre-tournament qualifier (PTQ) for the PBA Players Championship. The season was composed of 18 Tour title events, which included 16 singles events (nine standard, five major, two postseason), 2 doubles title events, and 2 non-title team events.

After the end of the 2025 regular season came news that the PBA and Fox Broadcasting had terminated their television contract. On April 30, 2025, the PBA announced that The CW had acquired the television rights to air ten live PBA Tour final rounds on consecutive Sunday afternoons, beginning February 22, 2026.

The PBA then announced on May 29, 2025 that all events of the 2026 and 2027 PBA World Series of Bowling would be covered on CBS stations. CBS Sports Network carried live coverage of four animal pattern events (including play-ins), while CBS terrestrial stations hosted live coverage of the PBA World Championship finals. CBS broadcasts were also live streamed on Paramount+. In 2026, the May 9–12 telecasts for the four animal pattern events of WSOB XVII included the semifinal and final rounds of the PBA event, plus the final round of a concurrent PBA50 World Series of Bowling event (including the PBA50 World Championship on May 12), marking the first PBA50 Tour television broadcasts since 2009.

The PBA Tour Finals, a postseason event which has aired on CBS Sports Network since the 2017 season, was replaced with the PBA Norm Duke Open. However, the television format remained much like the PBA Tour Finals, in which eight finalists from qualifying (four in two separate groups) competed in five hours of live coverage.

== Season overview ==
The 2026 PBA Tour season included 18 telecasts totaling 55 hours. The CW aired ten title events. CBS and CBS Sports aired six title events, plus two special non-title events (USA vs. The World and PBA Elite League Battle of the Brands).

As in 2025, the final rounds of all five major events were broadcast live on over-the-air network television (four on CW network and one on CBS). These included the finals of the PBA Players Championship on February 22, the U.S. Open on March 8, the USBC Masters on March 29, the PBA Tournament of Champions on April 26, and the PBA World Championship (part of the five-event PBA World Series of Bowling XVII) on June 13.

=== Season highlights ===
- With Austin Grammar's win in the Surfside PBA New York Classic on April 12, the 2026 PBA Tour season saw three rookies win in the same season for the first time in PBA history. Grammar joined Brandon Bonta (PBA Players Championship) and Spencer Robarge (Pilgrim's PBA Ohio Classic) as first-time winners in their rookie seasons. Two weeks later, Alex Horton became the fourth rookie winner of the 2026 season, winning the Tournament of Champions. With Horton and Robarge each winning a second title later in the season, 2026 saw a total of six titles won by rookies, also a PBA record.
- E. J. Tackett posted a 229.78 average during the season to set a new PBA record. Jason Belmonte had held the record since 2017, when he averaged 229.39.

=== Season Awards ===
- Chris Schenkel PBA Player of the Year: E. J. Tackett (85.5% of vote; unprecedented fourth consecutive POY award)
- Harry Golden PBA Rookie of the Year: Brandon Bonta (58.8% of vote)

== Tournament summary ==
The announced events to be held during the 2026 PBA Tour season are shown below. Major tournaments are in bold. Career PBA title numbers for winners are shown in parentheses (#). Winner's share prize money is shown in US dollars ($), except where indicated. The number shown with oil pattern names is the oil length in feet.

Tour points are awarded for most events. Besides the season-ending Harry Smith PBA Points Winner award, points are one consideration for Player of the Year voting and some postseason events.

- Tier 3: PBA short format or limited field tournaments (2500 points for first, and descending thereafter)
- Tier 2: PBA standard tournaments with an open field (double the points of Tier 3 events)
- Tier 1: PBA major tournaments (triple the points of Tier 3 events)

Sources for table below:

Event	Airdate	City	Preliminary rounds	Final round	Oil pattern	Winner	Notes
**PBA Players Championship**	Feb 22 CW	Euless, TX (qualifying & match play); Arlington, TX (finals)	Feb 17–20 (PTQ: Feb 16)	Live	Badger 50 & Viper 37 (PTQ: Mike Aulby 39)	Brandon Bonta, USA (1)	PBA members-only event (Tier 1). PBA major. $100,000 top prize.$
PBA Pete Weber Classic	Mar 1 CW	St. Peters, MO	Feb 25–27 (PTQ: Feb 24)	Live	Dick Weber 45 (PTQ: Shark 47)	Graham Fach, Canada (3)	Open event (Tier 2). $30,000 top prize.
**Go Bowling U.S. Open**	Mar 8 CW	Indianapolis, IN	Mar 3–7 (PTQ: Mar 1)	Live	Four custom patterns of 40, 47, 35 and 43 feet. 43-foot Pattern 4 used for match play & finals.	Patrick Dombrowski, USA (1)	Open event (Tier 1). PBA major. $100,000 top prize.
Groupon PBA Illinois Classic	Mar 15 CW	Decatur, IL	Mar 10–13 (PTQ: Mar 9)	Live	Carmen Salvino 43 (PTQ: Scorpion 44)	Anthony Simonsen, USA (17)	Open event (Tier 2). $30,000 top prize.
PBA Indiana Classic	Mar 22 CW	Fort Wayne, IN	Mar 18–20 (PTQ: Mar 17)	Live	Mike Aulby 39 (PTQ: Don Johnson 40)	Marshall Kent, USA (8)	Open event (Tier 2). $30,000 top prize.
**USBC Masters**	Mar 29 CW	Allen Park, MI	Mar 24–28	Live	41-foot custom Kegel pattern (alternating fresh & burn in qualifying rounds)	David Krol, USA (3)	Open event (Tier 1). PBA major. $100,000 top prize.
USA vs. The World	Apr 4 CBS+	Columbus, OH	None	Live	Randy Pedersen 43	The World team (5–1): Jason Belmonte (Australia), Dom Barrett (England), Jesper Svensson (Sweden), and Graham Fach (Canada)	Non-title event. The top US and international players of the last 25 seasons (E. J. Tackett and Jason Belmonte) captain teams of four players. Event features a captains singles match, a doubles match (captains ineligible), and two Baker team matches. One point awarded per match and two points awarded for team total pins. $60,000 top prize (team).#
Pilgrim's PBA Ohio Classic	Apr 5 CW	Columbus, OH	Mar 31–Apr 2	Live	Dragon 47	Spencer Robarge, USA (1)	Open event (Tier 2). No PTQ. 120 player starting field with non-priority entries added in registration order. $30,000 top prize.
Surfside PBA New York Classic	Apr 12 CW	Rochester, NY	Apr 7–10	Live	Bear 38	Austin Grammar, USA (1)	Open event (Tier 2). No PTQ. 120 player starting field with non-priority entries added in registration order. $30,000 top prize.
Owen's Craft Mixers PBA Roth-Holman Doubles Championship	Apr 19 CW	Portland, ME	Apr 16–17	Live	Marshall Holman 38 (left lane); Mark Roth 42 (right lane)	Zach Wilkins, Canada (1) & AJ Chapman, USA (1)	Open event (Tier 3-limited field). $50,000 top prize (team).
**PBA Tournament of Champions**	Apr 26 CW	Fairlawn, OH	Apr 22–24 (PTQ: Apr 21)	Live	Don Johnson 40	Alex Horton, USA (1)	Invitational event (Tier 1). PBA major. $100,000 top prize.
PBA WSOB XVII Cheetah Championship	May 9 CBS Sports*	Brooklyn Park, MN (qualifying); Lakeville, MN (match play & finals)	May 1, 9 (WSOB PTQ: Apr 29)	Live	Cheetah 35	Packy Hanrahan, USA (3)	Open event (Tier 3-short format). $20,000 top prize.
PBA WSOB XVII Chameleon Championship	May 10 CBS Sports*	Brooklyn Park, MN (qualifying); Lakeville, MN (match play & finals)	May 2, 10 (WSOB PTQ: Apr 29)	Live	Chameleon 39	Darren Tang, USA (2)	Open event (Tier 3-short format). $20,000 top prize.
PBA WSOB XVII Scorpion Championship	May 11 CBS Sports*	Brooklyn Park, MN (qualifying); Lakeville, MN (match play & finals)	May 3, 11 (WSOB PTQ: Apr 29)	Live	Scorpion 44	Zach Wilkins, Canada (2)	Open event (Tier 3-short format). $20,000 top prize.
PBA WSOB XVII Shark Championship	May 12 CBS Sports*	Brooklyn Park, MN (qualifying); Lakeville, MN (match play & finals)	May 4, 12 (WSOB PTQ: Apr 29)	Live	Shark 47	Alex Horton, USA (2)	Open event (Tier 3-short format). $20,000 top prize.
**AMF PBA World Championship**	Jun 13 play-in stepladder CBS Sports; Jun 13 finals CBS+	Brooklyn Park, MN (qualifying thru match play); Allen Park, MI (play-in round & finals)	May 1–4 (initial qualifying on WSOB "animal" patterns); May 5–6 (advancers round & match play)	Live	4 animal patterns (qualifying); Earl Anthony 42 (advancers round through finals)	E. J. Tackett, USA (28)	Open event for WSOB entrants (Tier 1). PBA major. Top 4 after match play earn automatic bids into finals. 5 through 9 seeds compete in a play-in stepladder to determine 5th seed. $100,000 top prize.
PBA Elite League: Battle of the Brands presented by BeatBox	June 20 CBS Sports	Bethlehem, PA	2026 season singles events	Live	Randy Pedersen 43	Team Storm (Mgr-François Lavoie): Jason Belmonte, Darren Tang, Chris Via, Kyle Troup & Patrick Dombrowski	Non-title team event. Six bowling ball manufacturer teams (Brunswick, Hammer, Storm, Roto Grip, 900 Global and MOTIV) earn points during the 14 season singles events (through PBA World Championship) to determine seeding. Top prize $33,000 (team).
The Magnum Ice Cream Company PBA Norm Duke Open	June 21 CBS Sports	Sinking Spring, PA (qualifying); Bethlehem, PA (finals)	Jun 15–19	Live	Norm Duke 39	Marshall Kent, USA (9)	Open event (Tier 2). Players grouped into two initial squads based on season points. (Split by odd and even ranking positions up to top 100, with additional entrants randomly placed.) Top four from each squad compete in separate televised stepladder rounds, with winners from each squad stepladder advancing to the "race to two points" televised finals. $40,000 top prize.
PBA-PWBA Storm Striking Against Breast Cancer Mixed Doubles (aka "The Luci")	Aug 2 BowlTV	Houston, TX	Jul 31–Aug 1	Live	Custom Kegel pattern	Spencer Robarge, USA (2) & Annalise OBryant, USA	Open PBA and PWBA title event. Highest combined scores of male and female singles matches after 7 games of qualifying, 4 games in Top 40 cashers round, and 12 roundrobin match play games (including bonus pins for match wins) determines the winning team. (No stepladder.) $25,000 top prize (team).
Storm Lucky Larsen Masters	Aug 31	Helsingborg, Sweden	Aug 21–30	Live	Custom 38-foot pattern	Raymond Teece, ENG (1)	200.000 SEK top prize (approx. $21,750 USD)

- $ = Brandon Bonta won an additional $10,000 for rolling a 300 game in the title match.
- + = Also live streamed on Paramount+.
- * = Five hours of coverage each broadcast. Broadcast opens with a PBA50 World Series of Bowling final round (Ballard Championship May 9, Monacelli Championship May 10, Petraglia Championship May 11, PBA50 World Championship May 12). The PBA animal pattern match play and championship finals follow.
- # = Tackett and Belmonte competed in a captains match on February 15, with Tackett winning. This gave the USA team choice of starting lane and the decision on which captain must set his lineup order first. Tackett chose Andrew Anderson and Ethan Fiore as his captain's selections, while Belmonte chose Dom Barrett and Jesper Svensson for the World team. The fourth player for each team was filled by the highest American and international player in competition points following the PBA Indiana Classic on March 22, which were Anthony Simonsen (USA) and Graham Fach (World).
