= Tom Daugherty =

American professional ten-pin bowler

Personal information
- Born: February 22, 1975 (age 51) Tampa, Florida, U.S.

Bowling Information
- Affiliation: PBA
- Rookie year: 2001
- Dominant hand: Right (no-thumb delivery)
- Wins: 4 PBA Tour (1 major); 25 PBA Regional Tour; 2 PBA50 Tour (2 majors); 1 PBA50 Regional Tour
- 300-games: 21
- Sponsors: Hammer Bowling, Turbo Grips, Dexter shoes

Tom Daugherty (born February 22, 1975) is a right-handed American professional ten-pin bowler residing in Riverview, Florida. He is a member of the Professional Bowlers Association (PBA), having joined in 2001. He is one of the very few PBA bowlers to successfully use the one-handed no-thumb delivery, although he uses his thumb for most spares. While Daugherty has won four PBA Tour titles (including one major) and 25 PBA Regional titles, he is perhaps best known for rolling a nationally televised 100 game at the 2011 PBA Tournament of Champions, the lowest score ever bowled in a televised PBA event.

Daugherty has also won two titles on the PBA50 Tour, both of them majors.

Nicknamed "Rebel" and "Tampa Tom", Daugherty has accumulated 21 career 300 games in PBA events. He is a pro staff member for Hammer bowling balls, Dexter shoes, and Turbo Inserts.

== PBA career ==
Daugherty became a PBA member in 2001, and started bowling regularly on the PBA Tour in the 2003–04 season. After three seasons of little success as a full-time Tour bowler, he returned to bowling mostly in PBA Regional Tour events for the next six seasons.

=== The 100 game ===
By way of his Regional Tour titles, Daugherty made the initial "Champions" field for the 2011 PBA Tournament of Champions. He fought his way into the "Elite" field and made the January 22 televised finals as the #2 seed, where he faced #3 seed Mika Koivuniemi in the semifinal match. Daugherty wound up on the wrong end of PBA history that day, rolling seven splits en route to a record-low 100 score. (The previous low score in a televised PBA Tour event was 129, shot by Steve Jaros in 1992.) With Koivuniemi narrowly missing perfection and bowling a 299 in the same match, Daugherty also became part of the most lopsided match in PBA history (–199 pins). Despite the embarrassment, Daugherty ran around and high-fived the crowd after knocking down the two pins he needed to reach the 100 mark. He cashed $50,000 for his third-place finish, joking after the match, "I made 500 dollars a pin!" In the next season's Tournament of Champions, Daugherty again made the Elite Field and was candid about the previous year's debacle:

"That 100 game was the best thing that ever happened to me. I have no problem with it. No one would remember me if I hadn't bowled that game. No one remembers Tom Smallwood and he finished second last year."

=== Success in 2012 ===
Daugherty returned to full-time touring status in the 2012–13 PBA season. He finally found success, winning his first national PBA Tour title on November 11, 2012, at the PBA Bowlers Journal Scorpion Championship, which was part of that season's World Series of Bowling in Las Vegas. He defeated Finland's Osku Palermaa in the final match. In his post-match interview, Daugherty stated, "Now I'm not just the guy who bowled a 100 game. I'm the guy who bowled a 100 game and also has a PBA title."

=== 2013–2020 highlights ===
Daugherty finished third at the 2015 PBA Players Championship, his best finish in a major since 2011. He was also a member of the Bass Pro Shops Silver Lake Atom Splitters team, which won the 2015 PBA League Elias Cup team title.

Daugherty made the TV finals for the 2016 PBA Tournament of Champions and the 2016 USBC Masters, but could not complete the quest for a title in either of these major events. He would win his second PBA Tour title on September 10, 2016, at the PBA Wolf Open in Allen Park, Michigan.

Daugherty was again a member of the Silver Lake Atom Splitters team, which won the PBA League title in 2018.

While he didn't win a title in 2019, Daugherty made a career-high 13 match play rounds and cashed a then-career high $75,890 in PBA earnings.

=== 2021: first major title and ESPY award ===
On March 13, 2021, Daugherty won his third PBA Tour title and first major at the PBA World Championship, the premiere event of World Series of Bowling XII. Having earned the #1 seed for the televised finals, the 46-year old defeated Jakob Butturff in his lone match, 263–257, to capture the title and $100,000 top prize. Four days later, Daugherty won his fourth PBA Tour title in the final event of the World Series. Hours after breaking the hearts of bowling fans by eliminating legends Pete Weber and Walter Ray Williams Jr. from match play, Daugherty topped Kyle Troup in the final match, 266–254, to capture his second career PBA Scorpion Championship. Daugherty and partner BJ Moore also finished second in another World Series of Bowling event, the Roth-Holman PBA Doubles Championship. Over the five-event 2021 World Series of Bowling, Daugherty claimed $139,750 in earnings, easily topping what he had earned in any previous full season of his career.

Based on points earned over the first nine events of the 2021 PBA season, Daugherty qualified as the #3 seed for the 2021 PBA Tour Playoffs. After topping Jason Sterner in the Round of 16, Tom was upset in the Round of 8 by #11 seed Sam Cooley. He would finish the 2021 season third in Tour points and third in earnings ($197,400).

On July 10, 2021, Daugherty was awarded an ESPY for Best Bowler.

=== PBA50 Tour ===
After turning 50 in February 2025, Daugherty joined the PBA50 Tour, while continuing to participate on the standard tour. He won his first PBA50 Tour title on June 8, 2025, at the USBC Senior Masters. As the top seed, he defeated PBA Hall of Famer Parker Bohn III in the championship match, 233–185. Following the 2025 season, Daugherty was named PBA50 Rookie of the Year.

On May 12, 2026, Daugherty won the PBA50 World Championship for his second PBA50 title and second major. In the final match, he defeated Mika Koivuniemi, the player he will always be linked to following the 299–100 loss in 2011. Daugherty now has a World Championship title on both Tours.

=== Other career highlights ===
Daugherty won the inaugural PBA LBC Champions Clash on September 28, 2023, in Portland, Maine. This was a special non-title event featuring 12 bowlers, a mix of male-female and amateur-professional, who were part of the PBA's League Bowler Certification (LBC) program and qualified during their division championships. It aired October 1 on Fox Sports 1. Daugherty topped PWBA star Danielle McEwan with a strike in the tenth and final round. In the elimination event, Daugherty struck on 10 of 12 shots, including all of his last five shots and two in roll-off rounds. He won $60,000 and The Duke trophy, named after PBA Hall of Famer Norm Duke.

== PBA wins ==
Major championships are in bold text.

=== PBA Tour titles ===
1. 2012 PBA Bowlers Journal Scorpion Championship (Las Vegas, Nevada)
2. 2016 PBA Wolf Open (Allen Park, Michigan)
3. **2021 Guaranteed Rate PBA World Championship** (Tampa, Florida)
4. 2021 PBA Scorpion Championship (Tampa, Florida)

=== PBA50 Tour titles ===
1. **2025 USBC Senior Masters** (Las Vegas, Nevada)
2. **2026 PBA50 World Championship** (Bloomington, Minnesota)

=== Non-title event victories ===
1. 2015 PBA League champion (w/Silver Lake Atom Splitters)
2. 2018 PBA League champion (w/Silver Lake Atom Splitters)
3. 2023 PBA LBC National Champions Clash

== International competition ==
Daugherty represented Team USA at the 2021 Weber Cup, an annual USA vs. Europe competition. In the USA's 17–18 loss to Team Europe, Daugherty participated in 11 of 35 matches, going 3–2 in singles, 2–1 in doubles and 0–3 in team.

== Personal ==
Daugherty has three daughters (Camryn and twins Cayce and Courtney) and a son (Kody), all from a previous marriage. In addition to earning a living on the lanes, he operates two bowling pro shops in the Tampa Bay Area, also running the store online via TDbowling.com.
