= Spencer Robarge =

American professional ten-pin bowler

Personal information
- Born: August 20, 2002 (age 24)

Bowling Information
- Sport: Tenpin bowling
- Affiliation: PBA
- Rookie year: 2026
- Dominant hand: Left (two-hand delivery)
- Wins: 2 PBA Tour; 4 PBA Regional Tour
- Sponsors: Brunswick, VISE grips

Spencer Robarge (born August 20, 2002) of Springfield, Missouri is an American professional ten-pin bowler who competes as a member of the Professional Bowlers Association (PBA). After attending and bowling for Wichita State University, Robarge turned pro in 2026. In his first full season on the PBA Tour, he won the Pilgrim's PBA Ohio Classic and the Storm Striking Against Breast Cancer Mixed Doubles (with Annalise OBryant). He bowls using the two-handed shovel style delivery with a dominant left hand.

Robarge is sponsored by Brunswick and VISE finger grips.

== Amateur career ==
Robarge first started competing in junior leagues as a 4-year old. He placed third at age 11 in his very first Junior Gold tournament, and success followed from there. He went on to win the 2015 U12 Junior Gold title the very next year, and became one of the most accomplished junior bowlers of all time. He won 12 Storm Youth Championships titles, was the USBC Male Youth High Average Award winner in the 2020–21 season (250 over 78 games), and set USBC Youth records with 41 perfect 300 games and 22 series of 800 or better. He was a member of Junior Team USA for four straight years (2020 through 2023). He won the inaugural PBA Junior National Championship in 2021.

As an 18-year old amateur, Robarge made the televised finals of the 2021 USBC Masters and finished in third place.

Robarge went on to attend and bowl for Wichita State University, where he majored in Business Management. He was named an NCBCA All-American all four years he competed (2022 through 2025). He helped his Shockers team win the 2023 Intercollegiate Team Championship, and won two Collegiate MVP awards.

== Professional career ==
Robarge turned pro in the 2026 season. In his very first PBA Tour event as a professional, the PBA Players Championship major, he made the televised finals as the #5 seed, but he lost the opening match to his former Wichita State teammate Brandon Bonta.

On April 5, 2026, Robarge won the Pilgrim's PBA Ohio Classic for his first PBA Tour title. As the #3 seed, he defeated Chris Via and Packy Hanrahan to move up the ladder and face #1 seed, former Wichita State grad and reigning PBA Rookie of the Year, Ryan Barnes. In a tight battle that came down to the tenth frame, Robarge emerged victorious with a 236–228 triumph. On August 2, 2026, Robarge and partner Annalise OBryant won the Storm PBA-PWBA Striking Against Breast Cancer Mixed Doubles tournament, giving Spencer his second PBA Tour title.

Robarge also has four PBA Regional Tour titles, all earned in 2026.

=== PBA Tour titles ===
1. 2026 Pilgrim's PBA Ohio Classic (Columbus, Ohio)
2. 2026 Storm PBA-PWBA Striking Against Breast Cancer Mixed Doubles w/Annalise OBryant (Houston, Texas)

== Personal ==
Robarge attended Kickapoo High School in Springfield, Missouri. He has an older half-brother, Blake Demore, who also bowled for Wichita State and in a few PBA events.
