= Kamron Doyle =

American ten-pin bowler

Kamron Doyle (born January 13, 1998) is an American ten-pin bowler from Brentwood, Tennessee.

== Amateur accomplishments ==
Doyle was at one time the youngest person in USBC history to record a sanctioned 800 series — a three-game set with scores adding to at least 800 — which he accomplished by rolling an 802 score on March 14, 2009, at the age of 11 years, 60 days. (Korey Reichard of Jackson, Michigan, aged 10 years, 7 months, 23 days, rolled an 800 series on January 21, 2012, to top Doyle's record.) Doyle is also the third-youngest bowler to roll a USBC-sanctioned 300 game, which he did in May 2008.

In league play on December 8, 2012, Doyle blasted the pins for an 818 series with games of 239, 300 and 279, achieving his 15th perfect game and the fourth time he rolled an 800 series. On December 11, 2012, bowling with his high school, Doyle rolled a 247, 279, and a 278 for an 804 series—his fifth in his young career. On February 2, 2013, Doyle bowled his 16th perfect game, and also rolled a 299.

Doyle also bowled in the Southern Scratch Junior Bowling Association (SSJBA) and had won 15 titles through 2012. On April 15, 2012, Kamron broke the SSJBA record for most titles in one season with six, topping Chad Pitcock's previous record of five titles in 2001. Doyle's record was subsequently broken by James Matthews, who earned seven titles in 2014.

Doyle qualified as the top seed at the 2016 U.S. Amateur Championships, but lost the January 9 final match and finished runner-up to Chris Via.

== PBA Regional Tour ==
Doyle became the youngest bowler to ever cash in a PBA tournament, when he entered a PBA South Region Event in Canton, Georgia, in May 2010, at age 12, and finished in 30th place out of 94 bowlers. He averaged 215 for 13 games in that event and earned $400 in his second-ever PBA regional event.

Kamron bowled another PBA regional, the PBA South Region Marion, NC Non-Champions Open, on April 1–3, 2011, at age 13. He blasted the pins for a 279 in the first game of match-play and compiled a 3–3 win-loss record en route to a respectable 7th-place finish out of 96 bowlers, earning $700 for the PBA event.

On August 26, 2012, Kamron had a stellar performance in a PBA South Region tournament in Canton, GA, finishing in a tie for third place out of 75 bowlers. In his 21 qualifying games, he tallied a total pinfall of 4,646, a 221.24 average, and posted a 5–3 win-loss record in match play. In the round of 16, Kamron defeated 2012 PBA Tour titlist Scott Newell, 3 games to 1, and the first game of the match, which the 14-year-old won 299–289, was easily the most exciting game of the tournament. Doyle added scores of 229, 244 and 261 to cap off an excellent four-game block of 1,033, a 258.25 average. He then went on to defeat Mike Williams II, 2 games to 1 in the round of 8, and met eventual tournament winner and bowling legend Walter Ray Williams, Jr. in the round of 4. Kamron lost to Walter Ray, 226–214 in the semi-final match, and earned $850 for the event.

Doyle won his first PBA Regional title on May 17, 2014, at the PBA Lightning Lanes Challenge in Marion, NC., at the age of 16 years, 124 days old. He knocked down 3543 pins in his 17 games, for a 208.41 average. He recorded a 7–2 win-loss record in match play and defeated Derek Phillips 201-182 in the title match to capture the first place prize of $1,500. A total of 69 bowlers started the event (one withdrew after 5 games).

== PBA Tour ==
On February 23, 2012, at age 14, Doyle became the youngest person to ever cash in a PBA Tour major tournament, when he qualified 54th (out of 394 bowlers from 12 different countries) and finished 61st at the prestigious U.S. Open in North Brunswick, NJ. In a scheduling oddity, Doyle, the youngest player in the event, bowled his qualifying round on the same lanes as 64-year-old PBA legend Johnny Petraglia. Said Petraglia of Doyle, whom he beat by just 7 pins: "I think he is going to be terrific. I remember bowling with Pete Weber in a pro-am in St. Louis when he was maybe 15, and I see the same kind of swing, the same fiery attitude, the same attributes Pete had when he was a teenager." In the U.S. Open, Doyle averaged 200.77 for the event, and earned $1340 for the week, finishing ahead of PBA stars Tommy Jones (65th), Amleto Monacelli (66th), Tom Baker (67th), Walter Ray Williams Jr. (74th), George Branham III (77th), Petraglia (78th), and Parker Bohn III (119th).

At age 15, Doyle was again successful in his second trip to the U.S. Open in 2013, as he qualified 38th with a 24-game pinfall of 4,896 to make the 65-player cut line. Doyle shot 1,233 in the 6-game cashers round, failing to make the 24-player match play round and finishing 37th overall out of 260 bowlers to earn $1140. Doyle averaged 204.30 for the event and finished way ahead of such bowling legends as Chris Barnes (55th place), and Parker Bohn III and Walter Ray Williams Jr. (tied for 75th place).

Doyle also had respectable U.S. Open finishes in 2015 (66th place, $930) and 2016 (36th place, $1825), before finishing a disappointing 108th in 2017.

=== PBA Rookie Year ===
After becoming a full-fledged PBA member at age 20, Doyle enjoyed his best finish in a PBA major at the 2018 USBC Masters in April. Out of a full field of 360 bowlers, he finished 14th, taking home $3,200. On August 19, 2018, Doyle had his best finish to date in a national PBA Tour event, placing third at the PBA Gene Carter's Pro Shop Classic in Middletown, Delaware.

On November 20, the PBA announced that Doyle had won the 2018 PBA Rookie of the Year award.
