= 2018 PBA Tour season =

- League: Professional Bowlers Association
- Sport: Ten-pin bowling
- Duration: January 26, 2018 – December 23, 2018

PBA Tour
- Season MVP: Andrew Anderson

PBA Tour seasons
- ← 2017 2019 →

The 2018 PBA Tour season, the 59th season of play of the U.S. Professional Bowlers Association's (PBA) ten-pin bowling tour, began on January 26, 2018. The season included 21 singles title events, two doubles title events, and a non-title team event (PBA League). The 2018 season was used to mark the PBA's 60th year of operations, which included a 148-player PBA 60th Anniversary Classic in Indianapolis, and the unveiling of the Tour's top 60 moments.

== Tournament schedule ==
The PBA Tournament of Champions and the PBA Players Championship majors were held in February. The season's third major, the USBC Masters, took place in April, while the U.S. Open was contested in late October. The PBA Tour Finals, first contested in 2017, returned for 2018, featuring the top eight money leaders from the start of 2016 through the 2018 Maine Shootout (April 18). It was held in Allen Park, MI on May 4-6.

On March 21, 2018, Fox Sports announced that it had acquired the television rights for the PBA Tour, replacing ESPN, with 26 broadcasts on Fox Sports 1 and four on Fox beginning in 2019. Fox aired an additional PBA Clash event on December 23, 2018, which served as Fox's debut bowling broadcast and as a prelude for the 2019 season. This broadcast drew a live TV audience of 1.768 million viewers, the highest audience for a bowling broadcast on any network since 2005.

Due to the new agreement, the World Series of Bowling and PBA World Championship were postponed from the 2018 season and moved to March 2019, in order to have them be part of Fox's 2019 schedule. They were replaced on the schedule with a reinstated PBA Fall Swing, held in the Tulsa suburb of Owasso, Oklahoma. This event consisted of two standalone title events (Wolf Open and Bear Open), with these events serving as initial qualifying for the PBA Tulsa Open.

== Season awards ==
The PBA announced its 2018 season awards on November 20.

- Chris Schenkel PBA Player of the Year: Andrew Anderson
- Harry Golden PBA Rookie of the Year: Kamron Doyle
- Steve Nagy Sportsmanship Award: Tom Smallwood
- Tony Reyes Community Service Award: Chris Barnes

== Tournament summary ==
Major tournaments are in bold. Career PBA title numbers for winners are shown in parentheses (#).

In late 2017, the PBA released a list of 16 oil patterns that would debut with the 2017 PBA World Series of Bowling and continue into 2018. The patterns now include both a name and number, with the number representing the oil length (in feet). There are nine "Animal" oil patterns: Cheetah 33, Wolf 33, Viper 36, Chameleon 39, Bear 39, Scorpion 42, Shark 45, Dragon 45, and Badger 52. (The Badger 52 pattern will not be used in 2018.) There are also seven "Legends" patterns: Johnny Petraglia 36, Don Carter 39, Don Johnson 40, Earl Anthony 42, Mark Roth 42, Carmen Salvino 44, and Dick Weber 45.

| Event | Airdate | City | Preliminary rounds | Final round | Oil pattern | Winner | Notes |
|---|---|---|---|---|---|---|---|
| DHC PBA Japan Invitational | Jan 28 X | Tokyo, Japan | Jan 26–27 | Live | Dragon 45 | Dominic Barrett, England (6) | Invitational event. ¥5 million (approx. $46,000) first prize. |
| **PBA Tournament of Champions** | Feb 11 E | Fairlawn, OH | Feb 5–10 | Live | Don Johnson 40 | Matt O'Grady, USA (1) | Invitational event. PBA major. $50,000 top prize. |
| Go Bowling! PBA 60th Anniversary Classic | Feb 18 E | Indianapolis | Feb 13–17 | Live | Dick Weber 45 | Jakob Butturff, USA (3) | Open event. $30,000 top prize. |
| **Barbasol PBA Players Championship** | Feb 25 E | Columbus, OH | Feb 19–24 | Live | Carmen Salvino 44 | Tom Smallwood, USA (3) | Open members-only event. PBA major. $40,000 top prize. |
| Mark Roth-Marshall Holman PBA Doubles Championship | Mar 25 E | Columbus, OH | Feb 19–24 | Feb 25 | Carmen Salvino 44 | Jason Belmonte, Australia (17) and Bill O'Neill, USA (9) | Open event. $24,000 top prize. |
| PBA-WBT Brunswick Euro Challenge | N/A | Munich, Germany | Mar 10-17 | Mar 18 | Not reported | Jenny Wegner, Sweden (NQ) | PBA and WBT title event. €11,500 ($14,150) first prize. |
| **USBC Masters** | Apr 15 E | Syracuse, NY | Apr 8–14 | Live | USBC Masters (custom) | Andrew Anderson, USA (1) | Open event. PBA major. $30,000 top prize. |
| PBA Xtra Frame Port Property Management Maine Shootout | Apr 18 X | Portland, ME | Apr 16–18 | Live | Mark Roth 42 | Dick Allen, USA (5) | Open match play tournament limited to 64 entries. $10,000 top prize. |
| OceanView at Falmouth PBA League | Quarterfinal 1: Apr 22 E Quarterfinal 2: Apr 29 E Semifinals: May 6 E Finals: May 13 E | Portland, ME | Apr 19–21 | Apr 22 | Mark Roth 42 | Go Bowling! Silver Lake Atom Splitters (Dick Allen, Chris Barnes, Tom Daugherty, A.J. Johnson, Jesper Svensson, Manager–Mark Baker) | Team event. $60,000 top prize. |
| 2018 PBA Tour Finals | Position Rd. 1: May 22 C Position Rd. 2: May 29 C Grp1 Stepladder: Jun 5 C Grp2 Stepladder: Jun 12 C Finals: Jun 19 C | Allen Park, MI | May 4–5 | May 6 | Position rounds on Johnny Petraglia 36, Don Carter 39, Mark Roth 42 and Dick Weber 45. Top seed chooses pattern afterward. | Jason Belmonte, Australia (18) | Invitational event featuring top 8 in PBA Tour prize money, 2016 through April 18, 2018. $30,000 top prize. |
| PBA Xtra Frame Wilmington Open | May 20 X | Wilmington, NC | May 18–19 | Live | Viper 36 | Cristian Azcona, Puerto Rico (1) | Open event. $10,000 top prize. |
| PBA-WBT Busan Cup | N/A | Busan, South Korea | May 20-25 | May 26 | Not reported | Annop Arromsaranon, Thailand (1) | PBA and WBT title event. ₩30 million ($27,875) top prize. |
| PBA Xtra Frame Greater Jonesboro Open | Jun 3 X | Jonesboro, AR | Jun 1–2 | Live | Don Johnson 40 | Andrew Anderson, USA (2) | Open event. $12,500 top prize. |
| PBA Xtra Frame Lubbock Sports Open | Jun 10 X | Lubbock, TX | Jun 8–9 | Live | Scorpion 42 | Chris Barnes, USA (19) | Open event. $13,000 top prize. |
| PBA Xtra Frame Parkside Lanes Open | Jul 2 X | Aurora, IL | Jun 29–Jul 1 | Live | Chameleon 39, Bear 39, Don Carter 39; top seed chooses stepladder finals pattern | E. J. Tackett, USA (10) | Open event. $10,000 top prize. |
| Storm Xtra Frame PBA/PWBA Striking Against Breast Cancer Mixed Doubles | Jul 29 X | Houston, TX | Jul 26–28 | Live | Not reported | E. J. Tackett, USA (11) and Liz Johnson, USA | Open PBA and PWBA title event. $16,000 top prize. |
| PBA Xtra Frame Gene Carter's Pro Shop Classic | Aug 19 X | Middletown, DE | Aug 17–18 | Live | Earl Anthony 42 | Anthony Simonsen, USA (4) | Open event. $15,000 top prize. |
| PBA Xtra Frame Kenn-Feld Group Classic | Aug 26 X | Coldwater, OH | Aug 24–25 | Live | Don Johnson 40 | Jakob Butturff, USA (4) | Open event. $10,000 top prize. |
| PBA-WBT Storm Lucky Larsen Masters | N/A | Malmö, Sweden | Sep 5–8 | Sep 9 | Not reported | Kyle Troup, USA (3) | PBA and WBT title event. $16,385 top prize. |
| PBA International-WBT Thailand | N/A | Bangkok, Thailand | Sep 22–27 | Sep 28 | Not reported | Danielle McEwan, USA (NQ) | PBA and WBT title event. ฿1,000,000 ($31,908) top prize. |
| FloBowling PBA Fall Swing Wolf Open | Oct 16 X | Owasso, OK | Oct 15–16 | Live | Wolf 33 | Anthony Simonsen, USA (5) | Open event. $10,000 top prize. |
| FloBowling PBA Fall Swing Bear Open | Oct 18 X | Owasso, OK | Oct 17–18 | Live | Bear 39 | E. J. Tackett, USA (12) | Open event. $10,000 top prize. |
| FloBowling PBA Fall Swing Tulsa Open | Oct 20 X | Owasso, OK | Oct 19–20 | Live | Match play: Dragon 45; Finals: Bear 39 (left lane), Wolf 33 (right lane) | Stuart Williams, England (2) | Top 18 from Wolf & Bear qualifying. $30,000 top prize. |
| **74th U.S. Open** | Oct 31 C | Wichita, KS | Oct 24–30 | Live | U.S. Open (custom) | Dominic Barrett, England (7) | Open event. $30,000 top prize. |
| PBA-WBT World Men's Championships – Masters Event | N/A | Hong Kong | Nov 24–Dec 4 | Dec 5 | Not reported | Mitch Hupe, Canada | Non-title event. Participants based on 2017–18 WBT event points. |
| PBA Clash | Dec 23 F | Houston, TX | N/A | Live | Don Johnson 40 | Marshall Kent, USA | Non-title elimination tournament. Top 8 earnings leaders from 2018 season. $25,000 winner-take-all prize. |

- C: broadcast on CBS Sports Network
- E: broadcast on ESPN
- F: broadcast on Fox
- X: broadcast on the PBA's Xtra Frame webcast service
- NQ: World Bowling Tour rules on handicapping allowed female competitors eight handicap pins per game. As a result, she did not qualify for a PBA or WBT title. A subsequent rule change has since eliminated the handicapping rule.
