= PBA World Series of Bowling =

North American multi-tournament ten-pin bowling event

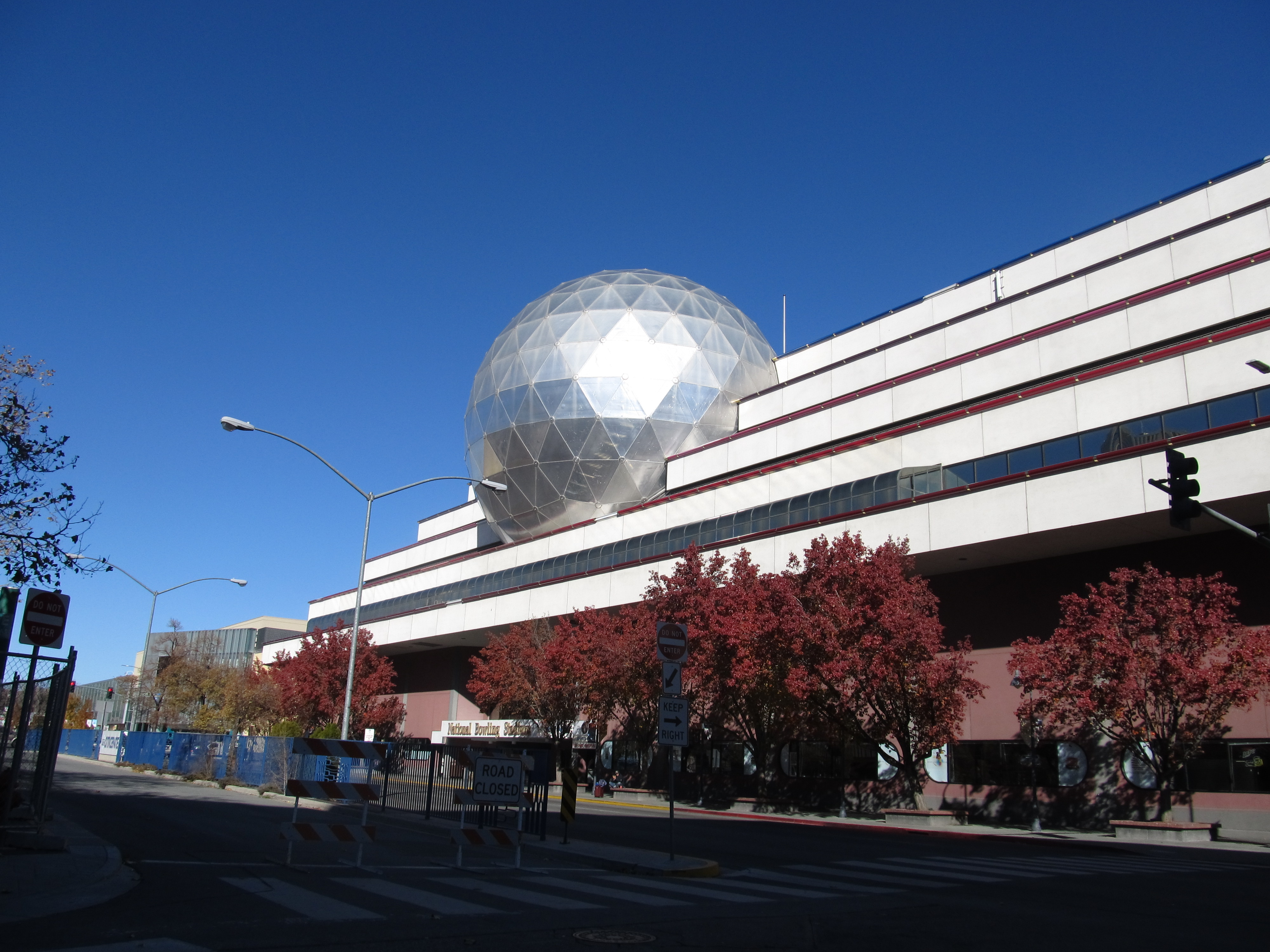
The National Bowling Stadium in Reno, Nevada was the site of the 2025 WSOB.

The PBA World Series of Bowling (WSOB) is an annual multi-tournament ten-pin bowling event held by the Professional Bowlers Association (PBA) in North America.

== Formation ==
The inaugural World Series of Bowling event was held by the PBA at the start of the 2009–10 PBA Tour season (August 2 through September 6, 2009), and took place in the Detroit, Michigan suburbs of Allen Park and Taylor. Part of the reason for developing the World Series, given the U.S. economic recession at the time, was to consolidate multiple tournaments into one location to save on travel and broadcast crew costs. The brainchild of then-Deputy Commissioner Tom Clark, the World Series included five “animal pattern” tournaments (Cheetah, Viper, Chameleon, Scorpion and Shark), each named for a custom lane-oiling pattern. All of the animal pattern tournaments took place in Allen Park's Thunderbowl Lanes. A stand-alone tournament at nearby Taylor Lanes, the Motor City Open, was also considered part of the inaugural World Series of Bowling. In addition to being stand-alone title tournaments, the animal pattern events served as initial qualifying for that season's PBA World Championship major. While television tapings for the final rounds of the Motor City Open and all five animal pattern tournaments took place September 5 and 6, the PBA World Championship finals were not held until December 13, 2009 in Wichita, Kansas.

== History ==
World Series of Bowling II moved to Las Vegas for the 2010–11 season. The event had five animal oil pattern events, with the PBA World Championship again running in a split format (qualifying in late October through early November, 2010, with the final rounds on January 14–16, 2011). Subsequent events ran only four or three animal pattern tournaments, but continued to use these events as initial qualifying for the PBA World Championship. After being held in Las Vegas for the next four years, the event moved to Reno, Nevada for three consecutive seasons.

The World Series of Bowling has run every PBA season since its inception, except for 2018. After Fox Sports acquired the PBA television rights earlier that year, the decision was made to move the World Series to a spring event so it would be included in Fox's TV schedule. Thus, World Series of Bowling X was moved from late 2018 to March 2019, and was held in its original home of Allen Park, MI.

Bowlers from over 30 countries have participated in the World Series of Bowling. PBA Commissioner Tom Clark has credited the WSOB with inspiring an influx of international players who now regularly compete on the PBA Tour.

Tournament formats and qualifying have changed over the years. For the 2026 season, priority registration was given to the top 75 PBA players in 2025 season points, the top three players in collegiate points, top three from the Regional Players Invitational tournament, any player with a national PBA Tour title in the last ten years, and any PBA Hall of Famer (Performance category). There are also a select number of international players chosen by way of resumé submissions through March 15, as well as Commissioner's exemptions. Any open spots in the initial field are filled from the ten-game April 29 Pre-Tournament Qualifier (PTQ). The starting field bowls ten qualifying games (in two 5-game blocks) on each of the four "animal" oil patterns. The 40 total games of qualifying determine the top one-third of bowlers who move on to the ten-game Advancers Round on the Earl Anthony 42 oil pattern. The top 16 players from the Advancers Round then compete in roundrobin match play. Pinfall from all rounds, plus 30 bonus pins for each match play victory, determine the nine players for the PBA World Championship semifinals. The 5–9 seeds bowl a play-in stepladder to determine the fifth seed for the televised finals, while the top four seeds automatically advance to the finals telecast.

== Event results ==
=== World Series of Bowling I ===
Dates: August 2–September 6, 2009 and December 13, 2009
Location: Allen Park, MI, except where noted

Events:

Event	Airdate	Preliminary rounds	Final round	Winner	Runner-up
Motor City Open	Nov 1	Aug 2–6 (Taylor, MI)	Sep 5	Walter Ray Williams, Jr., USA	Chris Barnes, USA
Cheetah Championship	Nov 8	Aug 11–13	Sep 5	Norm Duke, USA	Ryan Ciminelli, USA
Viper Championship	Nov 15	Aug 14–16	Sep 5	Rhino Page, USA	Ryan Ciminelli, USA
Chameleon Championship	Nov 22	Aug 18–20	Sep 6	Bill O'Neill, USA	Ronnie Russell, USA
Scorpion Championship	Nov 29	Aug 23–25	Sep 6	Mike Devaney, USA	Jason Belmonte, Australia
Shark Championship	Dec 6	Aug 27–29	Sep 6	Jack Jurek, USA	Mike Fagan, USA
PBA World Championship	Dec 13 (Wichita, KS)	Aug 30–Sep 3	Live	Tom Smallwood, USA	Wes Malott, USA

=== World Series of Bowling II ===
Dates: October 25–November 6, 2010 and January 14–16, 2011
Location: Las Vegas, Nevada

Events:

Event	Airdate	Preliminary rounds	Final round	Winner	Runner-up
Cheetah Championship	Nov 28	Oct 25, Nov 1	Nov 5	Eugene McCune, USA	Norm Duke, USA
Viper Championship	Dec 5	Oct 26, Nov 1	Nov 5	Bill O’Neill, USA	Andres Gomez, Colombia
Chameleon Championship	Dec 12	Oct 27, Nov 2	Nov 6	Scott Norton, USA	Sean Rash, USA
Scorpion Championship	Dec 19	Oct 28, Nov 2	Nov 6	Yong-Jin Gu, South Korea	Jun-Yung Kim, South Korea
Shark Championship	Dec 6	Oct 29, Nov 3	Nov 6	Osku Palermaa, Finland	Dan MacLelland, Canada
PBA World Championship	Jan 14–16	Oct 25–29	Live	Chris Barnes, USA	Bill O’Neill, USA

=== World Series of Bowling III ===
Dates: November 5–19, 2011
Location: Las Vegas, Nevada

Events:

Event	Airdate	Preliminary rounds	Final round	Winner	Runner-up
Viper Open	Jan 22	Nov 5	Nov 18	Stuart Williams, England	Ildemaro Ruiz, Venezuela
Chameleon Open	Feb 12	Nov 6	Nov 19	Jason Belmonte, Australia	Sean Rash, USA
Scorpion Open	Feb 19	Nov 7	Nov 19	Dominic Barrett, England	Sean Rash, USA
Shark Open	Mar 4	Nov 8	Nov 19	Jason Belmonte, Australia	Chris Barnes, USA
PBA World Championship	Jan 15	Nov 5–8, 17–18	Nov 18	Osku Palermaa, Finland	Ryan Shafer, USA

Notes: WSOB III was the first and only World Series in which all events were won by players from outside North America.

=== World Series of Bowling IV ===
Dates: November 3–11, 2012
Location: Las Vegas, Nevada

Events:

Event	Airdate	Preliminary rounds	Final round	Winner	Runner-up
Cheetah Championship	Dec 16	Nov 3–7	Nov 10	Bill O’Neill, USA	Mike Wolfe, USA
Viper Championship	Dec 23	Nov 3–7	Nov 10	Brad Angelo, USA	Mika Koivuniemi, Finland
Chameleon Championship	Dec 30	Nov 3–7	Nov 11	Scott Norton, USA	Jason Belmonte, Australia
Scorpion Championship	Jan 6	Nov 3–7	Nov 11	Tom Daugherty, USA	Osku Palermaa, Finland
PBA World Championship	Jan 13	Nov 3–9	Nov 11	Parker Bohn III, USA	Jason Belmonte, Australia

=== World Series of Bowling V ===
Dates: October 25–November 3, 2013
Location: Las Vegas, Nevada

Events:

Event	Airdate	Preliminary rounds	Final round	Winner	Runner-up
Cheetah Championship	Dec 1	Oct 25–26	Nov 2	Wes Malott, USA	Parker Bohn III, USA
Viper Championship	Dec 8	Oct 25, 27	Nov 2	Chris Barnes, USA	Ryan Ciminelli, USA
Chameleon Championship	Dec 15	Oct 25, 28	Nov 2	Ryan Ciminelli, USA	Dominic Barrett, England
Scorpion Championship	Dec 22	Oct 25, 29	Nov 3	Tom Smallwood, USA	Marshall Kent, USA
PBA World Championship	Jan 13	Oct 25–31	Nov 3	Dominic Barrett, England	Sean Rash, USA

=== World Series of Bowling VI ===
Dates: October 25–November 2, 2014
Location: Las Vegas, Nevada

Events:

Event	Airdate	Preliminary rounds	Final round	Winner	Runner-up
Cheetah Championship	Dec 14	Oct 25, 30	Nov 2	Anthony Pepe, USA	Dick Allen, USA
Viper Championship	Dec 21	Oct 26, 30	Nov 2	Mika Koivuniemi, Finland	Connor Pickford, USA
Chameleon Championship	Dec 28	Oct 27, 31	Nov 2	DJ Archer, USA	Ronnie Russell, USA
Scorpion Championship	Jan 4	Oct 28, 31	Nov 2	Michael Haugen Jr., USA	Martin Larsen, Sweden
PBA World Championship	Jan 11	Oct 25–31	Live	Mike Fagan, USA	Wes Malott, USA

=== World Series of Bowling VII ===
Dates: December 8–19, 2015
Location: Reno, Nevada

Events:

Event	Airdate	Preliminary rounds	Final round	Winner	Runner-up
Cheetah Championship	Dec 20	Dec 8, 14	Dec 18	Parker Bohn III, USA	Paul Moor, England
Viper Championship	Dec 27	Dec 9, 14	Dec 18	Ryan Ciminelli, USA	Kim Bolleby, Thailand
Chameleon Championship	Jan 3	Dec 10, 15	Dec 19	Jesper Svensson, Sweden	Pascal Winternheimer, Germany
Scorpion Championship	Jan 10	Dec 11, 15	Dec 19	Jon Van Hees, USA	Jason Sterner, USA
PBA World Championship	Dec 17	Dec 8–13	Live	Gary Faulkner Jr., USA	E. J. Tackett, USA

=== World Series of Bowling VIII ===
Dates: November 29–December 11, 2016
Location: Reno, Nevada

Events:

Event	Airdate	Preliminary rounds	Final round	Winner	Runner-up
Cheetah Championship	Dec 18	Nov 29, Dec 6, 8	Dec 10	Mike Wolfe, USA	Darren Tang, USA
Chameleon Championship	Dec 24	Nov 30, Dec 6, 8	Dec 10	Mitch Beasley, USA	A. J. Johnson, USA
Scorpion Championship	Dec 25	Dec 1, 7–8	Dec 10	Tommy Jones, USA	BJ Moore, USA
Shark Championship	Dec 25	Dec 2, 7–8	Dec 10	François Lavoie, Canada	Walter Ray Williams Jr., USA
PBA World Championship	Dec 11	Nov 29–Dec 5	Live	E. J. Tackett, USA	Tom Smallwood, USA

=== World Series of Bowling IX ===
Dates: November 8–19, 2017
Location: Reno, Nevada

Events:

Event	Airdate	Preliminary rounds	Final round	Winner	Runner-up
Chameleon Championship	Dec 17	Nov 8, 15	Nov 18	Liz Johnson, USA	Anthony Pepe, USA
Shark Championship	Dec 17	Nov 9, 15	Nov 18	Richie Teece, England	Charlie Brown Jr., USA
Cheetah Championship	Dec 24	Nov 11, 16	Nov 19	Jesper Svensson, Sweden	Thomas Larsen, Denmark
Scorpion Championship	Dec 24	Nov 12, 16	Nov 19	E. J. Tackett, USA	Jason Belmonte, Australia
PBA World Championship	Dec 31	Nov 8–9, 11–14	Nov 19	Jason Belmonte, Australia	Jesper Svensson, Sweden

=== World Series of Bowling X ===
Dates: March 12–21, 2019
Location: Allen Park, Michigan

Events:

Event	Airdate	Preliminary rounds	Final round	Winner	Runner-up
Cheetah Championship	Mar 18	Mar 12, 18	Live	Dick Allen, USA	Kyle Sherman, USA
Chameleon Championship	Mar 19	Mar 13, 19	Live	Jason Belmonte, Australia	Andres Gomez, Colombia
Scorpion Championship	Mar 20	Mar 14, 20	Live	Kristopher Prather, USA	BJ Moore, USA
PBA World Championship	Mar 21	Mar 12–16	Live	Jason Belmonte, Australia	Jakob Butturff, USA

=== World Series of Bowling XI ===
Dates: March 6–15, 2020 & October 1–5, 2020
Location: Las Vegas, Nevada & Centreville, Virginia

The PBA's World Series of Bowling XI, which included three standard PBA title events and the PBA World Championship, was scheduled to take place March 6–18, 2020 in Las Vegas, with live finals broadcasts occurring across four consecutive days on FS1 (one Sunday afternoon broadcast on March 15, followed by three prime time evening broadcasts on March 16–18). However, due to the coronavirus pandemic, only the PBA World Championship was completed in March. The match play rounds and finals of the other three tournaments were postponed, and eventually rescheduled for October 1–5, 2020. The location for the animal pattern tournament conclusions was also changed to Centreville, Virginia, allowing it to follow the PBA League event.

Events:

Event	Airdate	Preliminary rounds	Final round	Winner	Runner-up
Cheetah Championship	Oct 4	Mar 8, Oct 1	Live	Sean Rash, USA	E. J. Tackett, USA
Chameleon Championship	Oct 4	Mar 9, Oct 2	Live	Jason Belmonte, Australia	Brad Miller, USA
Scorpion Championship	Oct 5	Mar 10, Oct 3	Live	Carsten Hansen, Denmark	BJ Moore, USA
PBA World Championship	Mar 15	Mar 8–14	Live	Jason Belmonte, Australia	Anthony Simonsen, USA

=== World Series of Bowling XII ===
Dates: March 5–17, 2021
Location: Tampa, Florida

The PBA announced on January 15, 2021 that World Series of Bowling XII would take place in Tampa, Florida on March 7–17, with a pre-tournament qualifier (PTQ) on March 5. As in the previous season, WSOB XII included three animal pattern events (Cheetah, Chameleon, Scorpion) plus the PBA World Championship major. This season's WSOB also hosted the Roth-Holman PBA Doubles Championship. Combined pinfall from the three animal pattern qualifying rounds determines the top 30 that move on to the PBA World Championship cashers round, and also determines the top 16 teams that advance to the Roth-Holman Doubles match play rounds.

Event	Airdate	Preliminary rounds	Final round	Winner	Runner-up
PBA Guaranteed Rate World Championship	Mar 13	Mar 7–11	Live	Tom Daugherty, USA	Jakob Butturff, USA
Roth-Holman Doubles Championship	Mar 14	Mar 7–9, 12	Live	Andrew Anderson, USA & Kris Prather, USA	Tom Daugherty, USA & BJ Moore, USA
Cheetah Championship	Mar 15	Mar 7, 15	Live	Sam Cooley, Australia	Kris Prather, USA
Chameleon Championship	Mar 16	Mar 8, 16	Live	Shawn Maldonado, USA	Jakob Butturff, USA
Scorpion Championship	Mar 17	Mar 9, 17	Live	Tom Daugherty, USA	Kyle Troup, USA

=== World Series of Bowling XIII ===
Dates: March 3–16, 2022
Location: Wauwatosa, Wisconsin

World Series of Bowling XIII took place in Wauwatosa, WI on March 3–16, with a pre-tournament qualifier (PTQ) on March 1. As in the previous season, WSOB XIII included three animal pattern events (Cheetah, Scorpion, Shark) plus the PBA World Championship major. Combined pinfall from the three animal pattern qualifying rounds determined the top 30 that move on to the PBA World Championship cashers round. This season's WSOB opened with the Roth-Holman PBA Doubles Championship.

Event	Airdate	Preliminary rounds	Final round	Winner	Runner-up
PBA Roth-Holman Doubles Championship	Mar 6	Mar 3–5	Live	E.J. Tackett (USA) and Marshall Kent (USA)	D.J. Archer (USA) and Shawn Maldonado (USA)
PBA World Championship	Mar 13	Mar 7–11	Live	Kristopher Prather (USA)	Jason Sterner (USA)
Cheetah Championship	Mar 14	Mar 7, 14	Live	Kyle Sherman (USA)	Cristian Azcona (Puerto Rico)
Scorpion Championship	Mar 15	Mar 8, 15	Live	Jason Belmonte (Australia)	Anthony Simonsen (USA)
Shark Championship	Mar 16	Mar 9, 16	Live	Keven Williams (USA)	A. J. Chapman (USA)

=== World Series of Bowling XIV ===
Dates: April 7–23, 2023
Location: Wauwatosa, Wisconsin

World Series of Bowling XIV took place in Wauwatosa, WI on April 9–23, with a pre-tournament qualifier (PTQ) on April 7. WSOB XIV included three animal pattern events (Cheetah, Scorpion, Shark) plus the PBA World Championship major. Combined pinfall from the three 20-game animal pattern qualifying rounds determined the top 12 that moved on to World Championship match play. This season's WSOB television coverage opened with the USA vs. the World non-title event.

Event	Airdate	Preliminary rounds	Final round	Winner	Runner-up
Cheetah Championship	Apr 17	Apr 9–10	Live	E.J. Tackett (USA)	BJ Moore (USA)
Scorpion Championship	Apr 18	Apr 11–12	Live	Jakob Butturff (USA)	E.J. Tackett (USA)
Shark Championship	Apr 19	Apr 13–14	Live	Matthew Ogle (USA)	Sam Cooley (Australia)
PBA World Championship	Apr 23	Apr 9–14, 20	Live	E.J. Tackett (USA)	Jason Belmonte (Australia)

=== World Series of Bowling XV ===
Dates: April 2–21, 2024
Location: Allen Park, MI

World Series of Bowling XV returned to Allen Park, MI on April 2–21, kicked off by the Roth-Holman Doubles Championship on April 4 (PTQ on April 2). The pre-tournament qualifier (PTQ) for all singles events was April 6. In addition to the Doubles Championship, WSOB XV included three animal pattern events (Cheetah, Scorpion, Shark) plus the PBA World Championship major. Combined pinfall from the three 15-game animal pattern qualifying rounds (45 games total) determined the top 16 that moved on to World Championship match play.

Event	Airdate	Preliminary rounds	Final round	Winner	Runner-up
Roth-Holman Doubles Championship	Apr 14	Apr 4–5 (PTQ: Apr 2)	Apr 6 (taped)	Kristopher Prather (USA) & Andrew Anderson (USA)	Jason Belmonte (Australia) & Bill O'Neill (USA)
Cheetah Championship	Apr 15	Apr 8–9	Live	Deo Benard (USA)	Marshall Kent (USA)
Scorpion Championship	Apr 16	Apr 10–11	Live	Matt Russo (USA)	Packy Hanrahan (USA)
Shark Championship	Apr 17	Apr 12–13	Live	E. J. Tackett (USA)	Shota Kawazoe (Japan)
PBA World Championship	Apr 21	Apr 8–13, 18, 20	Live	E. J. Tackett (USA)	Matt Russo (USA)

=== World Series of Bowling XVI ===
Dates: March 3–22, 2025
Location: Reno, NV

The 16th PBA World Series of Bowling was held on March 3–22, 2025 in Reno, Nevada. For the first time since 2017, the WSOB included four animal oil pattern events prior to the PBA World Championship. Also, the Viper Championship returned to the slate of events at the WSOB for the first time since World Series of Bowling VII in 2015. E. J. Tackett placed in the top-4 of all five events, an unprecedented feat, as he won a third-consecutive PBA World Championship, defended his Shark Championship, was runner-up at the Viper Championship, and finished 3rd and 4th at the Scorpion and Cheetah Championships, respectively.

Event	Airdate	Preliminary rounds	Final round	Winner	Runner-up
Scorpion Championship	Mar 16	Mar 4–5, 16	Live	Rasmus Edvall (Sweden)	Rafiq Ismail (Malaysia)
Viper Championship	Mar 17	Mar 6–7, 17	Live	Darren Ong (Singapore)	E. J. Tackett (USA)
Chameleon Championship	Mar 18	Mar 8–9, 18	Live	Tun Hakim (Malaysia)	Kevin McCune (USA)
Shark Championship	Mar 19	Mar 10–11, 19	Live	E. J. Tackett (USA)	Tom Smallwood (USA)
PBA World Championship	Mar 22	Mar 4–11, 14–15, 20	Live	E. J. Tackett (USA)	Jason Belmonte (Australia)

=== World Series of Bowling XVII ===
Dates: April 29–May 12, 2026 & June 13, 2026
Location: Brooklyn Park, MN, Lakeville, MN & Allen Park, MI

The 17th PBA World Series of Bowling took place in Greater Minneapolis on April 29 (PTQ) through May 12, with the PBA World Championship semifinals and finals contested in Allen Park, Michigan on June 13. As in 2025, there were four animal pattern events that served as initial qualifying for the PBA World Championship. All animal pattern finals broadcasts also included the finals of a concurrent PBA50 World Series of Bowling event.

Event	Airdate	Preliminary rounds	Final round	Winner	Runner-up
Cheetah Championship	May 9	May 1, 9	Live	Packy Hanrahan (USA)	Matt Sanders (USA)
Chameleon Championship	May 10	May 2, 10	Live	Darren Tang (USA)	Jason Belmonte (Australia)
Scorpion Championship	May 11	May 3, 11	Live	Zach Wilkins (Canada)	Jesper Svensson (Sweden)
Shark Championship	May 12	May 4, 12	Live	Alex Horton (USA)	Ronnie Russell (USA)
PBA World Championship	Jun 13	May 1–6, Jun 13	Live	E. J. Tackett (USA)	Zack Wilkins (Canada)

== WSOB highlights ==
- 2009: Tom Smallwood, a 32-year old laid-off auto worker from Saginaw, Michigan who had re-qualified for the PBA Tour only seven months earlier, becomes the Cinderella story of the year, defeating Wes Malott in the PBA World Championship.
- 2010: The WSOB sees its first two international champions, as Yong-Jin Gu (South Korea) and Osku Palermaa (Finland) win the Scorpion and Shark Championships, respectively.
- 2011: All five events are won by international players – Stuart Williams and Dominic Barrett (England), Jason Belmonte (Australia, two titles), and Osku Palermaa (Finland).
- 2012: Redemption for Tom Daugherty, who had rolled a record-low televised 100 score in the previous season's Tournament of Champions; Daugherty wins the Scorpion Championship for his first PBA Tour title. Also, the PBA World Championship is won by 49-year old Parker Bohn III.
- 2015: Gary Faulkner Jr. becomes the second African American (following George Branham III) to win a PBA Tour title and PBA major, as he takes the PBA World Championship crown.
- 2017: Liz Johnson becomes the second female to win on the PBA Tour (following Kelly Kulick) and the first woman to win a WSOB event when she defeats fellow New Yorker Anthony Pepe for the Chameleon Championship title.
- 2019: Australian Jason Belmonte wins his second consecutive PBA World Championship title, giving him a record-breaking 11 major championships on the PBA Tour.
- 2020: Belmonte earns a three-peat in the PBA World Championship, becoming the second player (after Earl Anthony, who did it twice) to win this major three years in a row. The World Championship was the only event contested on schedule, due to the interruption caused by the COVID-19 pandemic. The finals of the three animal pattern events were eventually contested in October.
- 2021: It's the year of "Tampa Tom". In his hometown bowling center, Tom Daugherty wins two WSOB titles, including his first major in the PBA World Championship, and finishes second in another event.
- 2025: World Series of Bowling XVI sees the PBA Tour's first-ever winners from Singapore (Darren Ong-Viper Championship) and Malaysia (Tun Hakim-Chameleon Championship), as well as a three-peat by E. J. Tackett in the PBA World Championship.
- 2026: Darren Tang wins the Chameleon Championship bowling two-handed. Having previously won a 2021 title bowling one-handed, he is the first player to ever win PBA Tour titles both one-handed and two-handed. Later, E. J. Tackett earns the first-ever PBA Tour four-peat by winning the PBA World Championship.

== PBA50/60 World Series of Bowling ==
The World Series of Bowling concept was introduced on the PBA50 Tour (for players 50 years of age and over) in the 2023 season. The PBA50 World Series of Bowling featured three standard PBA50 events (PBA50 Ballard Championship, PBA50 Monacelli Championship and PBA50 Petraglia Championship) on three different oil patterns named after PBA Hall of Famers, followed by the PBA50 National Championship major. A full field of 192 players aged 50 and older competed, with all events taking place July 15-23 in Jackson, Michigan. The concept was expanded in 2025 to PBA60 (for bowlers 60 and older). There are two standard PBA60 events (Webb and Roth Championships) and the World Championship. The Webb and Roth tournaments use the oil patterns named for their respective bowlers..
