= Bob Benoit =

American ten-pin bowler

Bob Benoit (born July 21, 1954, in Topeka, Kansas) is a retired professional bowler in the Professional Bowlers Association (PBA), who was active in the 1980s and 1990s. Over the course of his career, Benoit won four PBA Tour titles, all between 1988 and 1993.

== PBA career ==
Benoit is mostly known for being the first bowler to bowl a perfect game in a televised title match, and became the fifth PBA bowler to throw a televised perfect game overall. He did this against Mark Roth, beating him 300–255, at the Quaker State Open on January 23, 1988. The victory was in front of his home crowd at the Forum Bowl in Grand Prairie, Texas, a place where Benoit bowled league during the eleven years in which he lived in Dallas. Only four other players have scored 300 in a televised title match since Benoit's feat: Mike Aulby in 1993, Tommy Jones in 2020, Jason Belmonte in 2022, and Brandon Bonta in 2026.

This was Benoit's first ever title, as well as his first appearance in a telecast, making him the first bowler in history to score 300 in their very first TV appearance. This distinction stood until 1996, when C.K Moore scored a 300 game in the semifinal round of the 1996 PBA Columbia 300 open, which was his first ever TV finals appearance. Benoit's distinction as being the only player to roll a championship match 300 in his TV debut was not matched until Brandon Bonta did so in 2026.

Benoit would later be on the other end of a televised 300 game, losing 300–236 to Butch Soper in a stepladder match of the Hilton Hotels Classic in July, 1994.

Benoit had 28 career top-five finishes and made it to the final match on eight occasions (wins in bold type):

- **January 23, 1988: Quaker State Open in Grand Prairie, TX** (defeated Mark Roth)
- January 21, 1989: Showboat Invitational in Las Vegas, Nevada (lost to Del Ballard Jr.)
- **February 16, 1991: Bud Light Classic in Sunrise, FL** (defeated Wayne Webb)
- March 9, 1991: Johnny Petraglia Open in North Brunswick, NJ (lost to Pete Weber)
- **June 1, 1991: Beaumont PBA Doubles Classic (w/Del Ballard Jr.) in Beaumont, TX** (defeated Steve Hoskins and Philip Ringener)
- July 6, 1991: El Paso Open in El Paso, TX (lost to Ray Edwards)
- August 6, 1992: Senior/Touring Pro Doubles (w/Nelson Burton Jr.) in Belleville, IL (lost to Justin Hromek and Dick Weber)
- **July 17, 1993: El Paso Open in El Paso, TX** (defeated Robert Lawrence)

== Personal ==
Bob's brother, Rick Benoit, is a former PBA Tour consultant for Brunswick. He currently provides coaching and training for both professional and amateur bowlers through BowlU International, a bowling program he founded. Rick serves as BowlU's President/Lead Instructor alongside PBA Tour professional and fellow Lead Instructor, Brad Angelo.

Bob currently is a coach at Seaman High School in Topeka, Kansas.
