= Darren Tang =

Right-handed American ten-pin bowler (born 1993)

Personal information
- Nationality: American
- Born: June 14, 1993 (age 33) San Francisco, California, U.S.
- Years active: 2016–present

Bowling Information
- Sport: Tenpin bowling
- Affiliation: PBA
- Rookie year: 2016
- Dominant hand: Right (two-handed delivery)
- Wins: 2 PBA Tour; 15 PBA Regional Tour
- Sponsors: Storm Products, Dexter shoes, VISE grips

Darren Tang (born June 14, 1993) is an American professional ten-pin bowler who joined the Professional Bowlers Association in 2016 after a collegiate career at San Jose State University. Born in San Francisco, he currently resides in Las Vegas, Nevada. He has also competed internationally as a member of Team USA.

Tang currently uses a two-handed shovel-style delivery with a dominant right hand. He has won two titles on the PBA Tour. His first title came as a one-handed bowler in the 2021 Bowlerstore.com Classic. His second title was earned bowling two-handed at the 2026 PBA Chameleon Championship. This gave him the distinction as the only player in PBA history to win separate PBA Tour titles bowling one-handed and two-handed. He has also won 15 PBA Regional Tour titles, and was the 2022 PBA Northwest Region Player of the Year.

Tang is a national pro staff member for Storm Bowling. He is also sponsored by Dexter shoes and VISE finger grips.

== Amateur career ==
Tang bowled collegiately for San Jose State University, where he was a three-time NCBCA All-American and finished runner-up at the 2016 Intercollegiate Singles Championship. He has also been a six-time member of Team USA (2018, 2019, and 2022–2025), and placed first in the 2022 and 2024 Team USA Trials. With Team USA, he has won one gold medal and three other medals in international competition. He won a silver medal in All-events and a bronze medal in Masters at the 2019 PABCON Championships.

== Professional career ==
Tang became a PBA member in 2016. He made his first televised finals appearance on December 18 in the 2016 PBA Cheetah Championship, part of that season's PBA World Series of Bowling, where he finished runner-up to Mike Wolfe. After making just four final round appearances over the next four years, he broke through with his first title at the Bowlerstore.com Classic in Coldwater, Ohio on August 15, 2021. As the top seed, Tang dominated #2 seed Kyle Troup in the title match, 254–174. Tang also won an additional $20,000 for earning the most points during the PBA's summer series that year.

Tang then went through three seasons of struggles, finishing 28th on the Tour points list in 2022 before falling to 40th in 2023 and 56th in 2024. After poor finishes in the first two events of the 2025 PBA Tour season, Tang made the bold decision to switch from one-handed bowling to the two-handed shovel-style delivery. Later in the 2025 season, Tang won a PBA Regional Title using the new delivery.

At the 2026 PBA Chameleon Championship, the second event of PBA World Series of Bowling XVII, Tang qualified as the #2 seed, earning him a bye into the quarterfinal round. He defeated David Krol in the quarterfinal match and Santtu Tahvanainen in the semifinal round to move on to face all-time major titles leader Jason Belmonte in the race-to-two-points final match. Tang swept Belmonte, 247–217 and 176–167 to earn his second PBA Tour title, while also becoming the first player to ever earn PBA Tour titles bowling one-handed and two-handed. After finishing 55th on the 2025 PBA Tour points list, Tang moved up to a tenth place ranking in 2026.

=== PBA Tour titles ===
1. 2021 PBA Bowlerstore.com Classic (Coldwater, OH)
2. 2026 PBA WSOB XVII Chameleon Championship (Lakeville, MN)

=== Other accomplishments and honors ===
- 2016 Intercollegiate Singles Championship runner-up
- 2016 PBA West and Northwest Region Rookie of the Year
- 2022 Northwest Region Player of the Year
- Six-time member of Team USA; 2022 and 2024 Team USA trials champion
- First player to win PBA Regional Tour titles bowling one-handed and two-handed
- First player to win national PBA Tour titles bowling one-handed and two-handed

== Personal life ==
Darren's brother, Michael Tang, is also a PBA member who has competed on the PBA Tour and in PBA Regional competition. The two faced each other in the televised finals of the 2017 USBC Masters. Michael won that match, but did not go on to win the title.
