= Brandon Bonta =

American professional ten-pin bowler

Personal information
- Born: December 21, 2002 (age 23)

Bowling Information
- Affiliation: PBA
- Rookie year: 2026
- Dominant hand: Right (power stroker delivery)
- Wins: 1 PBA Tour (major); 1 PBA Regional Tour; 2026 Harry Golden PBA Rookie of the Year
- Sponsors: 900 Global, Turbo Grips

Brandon Bonta (born December 21, 2002) of Wichita, Kansas is a right-handed American professional ten-pin bowler who competes as a member of the Professional Bowlers Association (PBA). After attending Wichita State University, Bonta turned pro in 2026. In his very first event on the PBA Tour, he won the PBA Players Championship with a perfect 300 game in the title match, the PBA Tour's 36th-ever televised perfect game.

Bonta is sponsored by 900 Global and Turbo Grips.

== Amateur career ==
Bonta burst onto the bowling scene when he finished second at the 2018 U15 Junior Gold Championships. He attended and bowled for Wichita Northwest High School, and helped his team win two 6A Kansas state championships (2018, 2021). As a senior in 2021, he won the high school individual state title.

Bonta went on to attend Wichita State University, where he majored in Sports Management. He was a three-time NCBCA first-team collegiate All-American (2023, 2024, 2025) and was a second-team All-American in 2022. His Shockers bowling team won the 2023 National Championship.

He is a two-time member of Junior Team USA (2021 and 2022), and made Team USA in 2023.

== Professional career ==
Bonta turned pro in the 2026 season. In his very first PBA Tour event, the PBA Players Championship major, he qualified as the #4 seed, meaning he had to win four matches in the televised finals to climb the stepladder and win. After defeating #5 seed and fellow Wichita State grad Spencer Robarge in the opening match, he upset two former PBA major champions, Jesper Svensson and Graham Fach, to face #1 seed and four-time PBA Player of the Year E. J. Tackett in the title match. In a debut for the ages, Bonta rolled the PBA Tour's 36th televised perfect 300 game to defeat Tackett 300–238. In addition to the $100,000 winner's check, Bonta received a $10,000 bonus for the perfect game. He is the fifth PBA player overall to score 300 in his TV debut, but only the second to do so in the championship match of his debut. The first was Bob Benoit in 1988.

Bonta made the televised finals of a second major event in 2026, the PBA Tournament of Champions, but he was defeated in the opening match by Jason Belmonte. He made the top ten in four of the season's five major tournaments.

Bonta finished the 2026 season third in points and seventh in average (223.56), topping all rookies in each category. He also earned $163,800 to shatter the rookie record of $113,502 set by Ryan Barnes just a year earlier. On September 26, Bonta was named Harry Golden PBA Rookie of the Year for the 2026 season. In a year with four rookie title winners, Bonta garnered 58.8% of the vote.

== Personal ==
Bonta is a Wichita native, son of Kelly and Christy Bonta.
