= MOTIV Bowling =

American bowling equipment company

MOTIV Bowling is an American company involved in the manufacture and sale of bowling balls and bowling-related accessories. The company headquarters are in Spring Lake, Michigan, with the main manufacturing facility in nearby Roosevelt Park, Michigan.

== History ==
MOTIV had its beginnings in the 1990s as Wilbur Products, a company that engineered cores for other high-performance bowling ball brands. When its largest customer (Brunswick) chose to move its manufacturing from Michigan to Mexico, Wilbur Products embarked on a project to start its own bowling ball production, launching the MOTIV brand in 2009. Said company president W. Scott Wilbur: "When our primary customer for bowling products left for Mexico in 2006, we enacted our belief that bowling ball manufacturing in America was still possible if a business was truly focused on excellence in innovation and cutting-edge manufacturing processes."

=== Patents ===
MOTIV patented a process called NeoMark[TM], which integrates logos and other graphics into the cover stock of the ball. (Other bowling ball manufacturers use etching or engraving for logos and graphics.)

== Current company ==
MOTIV continues to operate out of the Muskegon, Michigan metro area, and employs approximately 45 people. In February of 2026, the company announced a major $8.9 million expansion to boost capacity and streamline production due to increasing global demand for its products, with the acquisition of a 96,000 square foot facility in Roosevelt Park, MI. The expansion is expected to create about 90 new jobs, with both bowling ball production and exporting logistics operating out of the new facility. Research and design will continue to operate out of the company's Spring Lake property two miles away.

MOTIV has become a notable high-performance brand among league, tournament and professional players, and is now one of three parent companies (with Storm and Brunswick) producing balls authorized for use on the PBA and PWBA Tours. During the 2025 PBA Tour season, MOTIV was the only bowling ball manufacturer represented on every televised finals broadcast, while MOTIV equipment won half of the PBA singles titles on the season. MOTIV pro staff member E. J. Tackett has won five PBA Player of the Year awards, including the last four in a row.

=== MOTIV-sponsored professional bowlers ===
MOTIV has produced many bowling balls used in the sport by competitive players, and has several sponsorship agreements on both the PBA and PWBA Tours.

List of notable MOTIV-sponsored players as of January 1, 2026:

- Dick Allen
- Sam Cooley
- Michael Davidson
- Rasmus Edvall
- Ethan Fiore
- A. J. Johnson
- Sean Lavery-Spahr
- Gillian Lim
- Wesley Low
- Nick Pate
- Maria José Rodriguez-Bohr
- Ronnie Russell
- Matt Russo
- Tom Smallwood
- E. J. Tackett
- Zac Tackett
- Santtu Tahvanainen
