= Tom Smallwood =

American PBA bowler

Personal information
- Born: November 5, 1977 (age 48) Flushing, Michigan, U.S.
- Years active: 2008–present
- Height: 5 ft 6 in (168 cm)

Bowling Information
- Affiliation: PBA
- Rookie year: 2003–04
- Dominant hand: Right (half-thumb full roller delivery)
- Wins: 3 PBA Tour (2 majors); 5 PBA Regional Tour
- 300-games: 11
- Sponsors: MOTIV Bowling, Vise Inserts

Thomas Smallwood (born November 5, 1977) is an American professional ten-pin bowler competing on the PBA Tour. In 2009, the right-hander won his first PBA Tour title and first major in the PBA World Championship, defeating 2008–09 PBA Player of the Year Wes Malott in the final match. Smallwood has won three PBA Tour titles, two of which are majors. He has finished runner-up in three other PBA major championships.

== Early life ==
Growing up in Flushing, Michigan, Smallwood's parents took him as a toddler to Colonial Lanes for their Sunday-night mixed league which led to his interest in bowling. He played other sports but always came back to bowling. He went to Saginaw Valley State University, but soon quit to be a bowler.

== Bowling career ==
=== Early years ===
At age 19, Smallwood went to Las Vegas for a 1997 high-roller amateur (non-PBA) tournament for the first time. He fell short of winning $10,000 on the second day.

Tom had been an excellent bowler in classic leagues in and around Saginaw, and supplemented his income by competing in local tournaments and a few open PBA events. He estimated that even in a lean year, he would net an extra $10,000 to $15,000 from bowling. He qualified for his PBA Tour card in 2003–04 because he did well in PBA Regional Tour events. However, he did not handle the pressure well in his first try on the national PBA Tour, missing the cut in 19 of 20 events. He finished 53rd on the Tour points list and did not make the next season's all-exempt Tour.

Smallwood then found a job at a metal shop as his then-girlfriend (now wife) Jennifer would not marry a man without a regular paycheck. At age 30, Tom had decided he was "done" with trying to be a full-time bowler, content to work during the week and bowl weekend tournaments that paid as little as $800 for first place. He then got a job at General Motors' Pontiac East Assembly Plant in the Spring of 2008 only to get laid off two days before Christmas. Tom, then married and with one child, agreed to look for a new job for two months before considering a return to the PBA Tour. Smallwood practiced for free at State Lanes in Saginaw after job applications did not pan out, having been a regular league bowler there and being neighbors of the owners, Anne and Steve Doyle.

=== Success in 2009 ===
Still looking for a regular job, Smallwood learned that the PBA Tour Trials would be held in the Detroit area in May, 2009, making travel a non-issue. He swore to Jen that this would be his last attempt at bowling for a PBA Tour card. He and Jen scraped together the $1500 entry fee and Tom finished third at the Trials (out of 97 bowlers), easily making the top eight who gained PBA exemptions for the 2009–10 season. "I always felt I could compete out there [on the Tour], but I was also content with working and staying with my family," Smallwood said in an interview with USA Today just prior to the PBA World Championship finals.

Ironically, he was offered a chance to go back to work at General Motors, when a representative from that company's job bank called him just days before the 2009 World Championship finals. Smallwood had to decline, telling the rep that he was a full-time bowler now and would in fact be on ESPN television that Sunday. Smallwood, now a 32-year old "rookie", then shocked the bowling world on December 13, 2009, by making it to the final match of the PBA World Championship and defeating reigning PBA Player of the Year Wes Malott, 244–228, for the title.

With his major tournament win at the PBA World Championship, Smallwood earned a PBA Tour exemption through the 2011–12 season. In his first full season on the PBA Tour, he made 15 cuts and eight match-play rounds in 18 events, while appearing in three televised finals. Tom's "rags to riches" victory in the World Championship was voted #47 in the PBA's "60 Most Memorable Moments" list, revealed as part of the PBA Tour's 60th Anniversary celebrations during the 2018 season.

=== Continuing in the PBA ===
Smallwood qualified as the #1 seed for the 2011 PBA Tournament of Champions, which offered a PBA-record $250,000 first prize for the January 22 televised finals. He faced Mika Koivuniemi, fresh off a 299 semifinal game, in the final match, but lost 269–207 to take home the $100,000 runner-up check. He made four TV finals overall in 2010–11, but did not win a title.

Smallwood won his second PBA title on November 3, 2013, at the World Series of Bowling PBA Scorpion Championship. To get to the final match on this day, he survived the longest sudden-death roll-off in PBA history (at the time) after tying Josh Blanchard 232–232 in the semifinal. Smallwood threw five strikes in the roll-off, while Blanchard threw four strikes before leaving a 10 pin on his fifth shot. Smallwood then defeated top seed Marshall Kent in the final match.

Smallwood made a bid to win his second PBA World Championship in December, 2016, charging from the #4 seed to the finals, but he fell to #1 seed E. J. Tackett in the title match. Smallwood was voted by his peers to receive the PBA Steve Nagy Sportsmanship Award for the 2016 season.

On February 25, 2018, Smallwood won his third PBA title and second major at the Barbasol PBA Players Championship. Smallwood climbed from the #5 seed in the TV finals, eventually defeating top seed Jason Belmonte in the final match. On November 20, 2018, the PBA announced that Smallwood had won his second career PBA Steve Nagy Sportsmanship Award.

Based on 2020 season points, Smallwood qualified as the #14 seed for the season-ending PBA Tour Playoffs. He made it all the way to the final four (semifinal) round before being defeated by eventual champion Bill O'Neill. Smallwood was the only player in the final four that did not earn a bye into the second round.

On February 6, 2021, Smallwood won the Central Region qualifier for the PBA Players Championship, earning a spot in the February 21 final round, which offered a PBA record-tying $250,000 first prize. Smallwood qualified as the #4 seed in the finals and, in the first match, beat Anthony Simonsen 278–225 to advance and bowl against third-seeded Dick Allen. Prior to Smallwood's seventh frame in this match, Allen knocked over his water bottle, some thought intentionally, spilling water on the floor. This caused a lengthy delay. After this, Smallwood did not perform as well, which some attributed to the delay, but he still had a chance to shut out Allen in the ninth and tenth frames. However, Smallwood rolled an errant ninth frame shot that ultimately cost him the match. Smallwood himself later said the ball landed on the thumb hole, causing it to project several boards to the right, and placed no blame on Allen or the delay. After Smallwood failed to make the ninth frame spare and then threw a split in the tenth frame, Dick Allen won 216–195. Smallwood won $60,000 for finishing fourth in the tournament.

On the first day of qualifying for the 2021 PBA Tournament of Champions on February 23, Smallwood toppled 3,153 pins (262.75 average) to set the all-time PBA record for a 12-game block. However, by the end of the week, Tom just missed making the televised finals, losing a roll-off to François Lavoie for the fifth and final seed to finish the tournament in sixth place.

Smallwood's 2021 Players Championship earnings pushed him over the $700,000 mark in career PBA earnings. He also has five PBA Regional Tour titles, and has rolled eleven perfect 300 games in PBA competition.

In January 2024, Smallwood qualified as the top seed at the PBA Players Championship, but had to settle for his third runner-up finish in a major, falling to Bill O'Neill in the championship match. In May, 2024, he faced Andrew Anderson in game 4 of the play-in round of the PBA Tour playoffs and shot a 298, two pins short of a perfect game, and sending him into the PBA Tour Playoffs as the #12 seed. For the 2024 season, Smallwood finished 12th in Tour points and cashed $102,175.

== Personal life ==
Tom Smallwood was born to Dennie and Sharon. His father worked at General Motors, primarily at a Flint Chevrolet plant manufacturing V6 engines. Smallwood is married to Jennifer "Jen" (née De Veaux). The couple has a daughter, Hannah Rose, and a son, Brady. Tom is a native of Flushing, Michigan.

In 2020, Smallwood became a pro staff member for MOTIV Bowling and later that year was named a MOTIV brand ambassador. Prior to 2020, he was sponsored by Radical Bowling.

== In the media ==
On March 1, 2021, CBS Television announced it had ordered a pilot for a multi-camera sitcom based on the life of Tom Smallwood and his journey from laid-off auto worker to professional bowler. The pilot for the family sitcom was produced by David Hollander and Saginaw, MI native Brian d'Arcy James, and written by Mark Gross (Man with a Plan). Actor-comedian Pete Holmes was chosen to play the lead as Smallwood. In April 2021, it was announced that Chi McBride and Katie Lowes would co-star in the pilot. On May 14, 2021, CBS officially picked up the series, planning a mid-season debut in the 2021–22 television season. The CBS promo read:

Here's the thing Tom Smallwood (Pete Holmes) knows about bowling: You get two chances. No matter what you do with the first ball, you get another roll to make it right. A story of the ultimate second chance, Smallwood tells of a Detroit assembly-line worker who, with the consent of his loving wife (Katie Lowes), decides to turn an unexpected layoff into a dream-fulfilling new job as a pro bowler. Based on the true "modern-day Michigan fable" of three-time PBA Tour winner Tom Smallwood.

On November 24, 2021, it was announced that the series title had been changed from Smallwood to How We Roll. The series premiered on March 31, 2022, but was canceled after one season (11 episodes) two months later.
