= Chris Via =

American professional ten-pin bowler

Personal information
- Born: March 9, 1992 (age 34)

Bowling Information
- Affiliation: PBA
- Rookie year: 2017
- Dominant hand: Right (two-hand delivery)
- Wins: 2 PBA Tour (1 major); 3 PBA Regional Tour
- Sponsors: Storm Products, Turbo Grips

Chris Via (born March 9, 1992) is an American professional ten-pin bowler from Springfield, Ohio known for winning the 2021 U.S. Open. Chris uses the two-handed shovel-style delivery with a dominant right hand. He competes in events on the PBA Tour, where he has won two titles to date. He also bowls internationally as a multi-year and current member of Team USA.

Via rolled the PBA Tour's 30th-ever televised perfect 300 game, accomplished February 7, 2021 at the East Region Finals of the 2021 PBA Players Championship. At the PBA Tour Finals on June 27, 2021, in Allen Park, Michigan, Via rolled the PBA's 32nd televised 300 game. He joined Sean Rash and François Lavoie as the only players in history to score 300 in two televised PBA Tour title events. Jason Belmonte would roll his second televised 300 game in 2022 to also join this group. Chris is the only one of the four to roll both of his 300 games in the same season.

Via is a pro staff member for Storm bowling balls and Turbo Grips inserts.

== Early life ==
Via claims to have been bowling since age 1. He bowled in a Saturday morning league with an older sister until age 12, took a break to play on a traveling basketball team for a few years, then returned to bowling at age 15. He attended Kenton Ridge High School in Springfield, Ohio. His high school teams won the Ohio state bowling championships in 2009 and 2010.

== Amateur career ==
Via bowled collegiately at Notre Dame College in South Euclid, Ohio. While earning his degree in accounting, his bowling prowess won him National Collegiate All-American honors in three straight seasons (2011–12, 2012–13 and 2013–14). He was a member of Junior Team USA in 2011 and 2012, and won a Team Gold Medal at the 2012 World Youth Bowling Championships. While in college, he won a 2013 PBA Regional Tour event as a non-member. Chris went on to win the 2016 U.S. Amateur Championship, securing the title with a final match victory over Kamron Doyle. This earned Via a spot on Team USA for 2016, and he would remain a Team USA member through 2018. Following his breakout 2021 PBA season, Via was again a member of Team USA for 2022 through 2025.

Via represented the US in the 2021 Weber Cup, an annual USA vs. Europe competition. In the USA's 17–18 loss to Team Europe, Via participated in 11 of 35 matches, going 3–1 in singles, 2–2 in doubles, and 0–3 in team.

== Professional career ==
Via joined the Professional Bowlers Association in 2017. In his first full season, he cashed in 12 of 20 events, made match play 7 times, made one championship round appearance, and won his first Regional Tour title as a PBA member. He made only one more championship round appearance over the next two seasons, while winning another Regional title in 2019.

After appearing in the televised finals of four PBA majors between 2020 and 2021 without winning, Via won his first national PBA Tour title and first major at the 2021 U.S. Open. Having qualified as the #1 seed for the April 11 finals, Via won his lone TV match over second-seeded Jakob Butturff by a single pin, 214–213. Via finished third in the 2021 Chris Schenkel PBA Player of the Year voting, behind Kyle Troup and François Lavoie, while also finishing second in Tour points (behind Troup), and sixth in earnings ($125,210).

On September 28, 2023 (broadcast October 22 on Fox), Via won the non-title PBA Strike Derby in Portland, Maine.

On July 27, 2025, Via won his second PBA title in the PBA-PWBA Striking Against Breast Cancer Mixed Doubles tournament, with partner Bryanna Coté. Despite no singles titles in 2025, his consistency helped him rank sixth in points and seventh in earnings with a new career high of $147,684. On September 23, the PBA announced that Via had won the PBA Tony Reyes Community Service Award for 2025. The award annually recognizes "a current PBA member who exemplifies extraordinary community service, charitable or educational contributions over the course of a PBA season." Via has been active with the PBA's Bowlers to Veterans Link (BVL), and caught the attention of PBA Commissioner Tom Clark at the Striking Against Breast Cancer Mixed Doubles tournament, where he donated the bonus money for his two 300 games (the only two rolled during the entire tournament) back to the SABC foundation.

Despite no wins in the 2026 PBA Tour season, Via finished sixth in points and seventh in earnings ($120,988).

=== PBA Tour titles ===
Major titles are in bold text.

1. **2021 U.S. Open** (Reno, Nevada)
2. 2025 PBA-PWBA Striking Against Breast Cancer Mixed Doubles w/Bryanna Coté (Houston, Texas)

=== PBA non-title wins ===
1. 2023 PBA Strike Derby (Portland, Maine)
2. 2025 PBA Elite League Battle of the Brands Championship (member of champions Team Storm)
3. 2026 PBA Elite League Battle of the Brands Championship (member of champions Team Storm)

== Awards and accomplishments ==
- 2016 U.S. Amateur champion
- 2x PBA Tour titlist with one major championship
- Only PBA player to roll two televised 300 games in PBA title events during the same season (2021)
- 2025 PBA Tony Reyes Community Service Award winner

== Personal life ==
In addition to earning a living on the lanes, Via co-owns TV Bowling Supply in Columbus, Ohio with fellow PBA member Michael Tang. Chris now resides in Blacklick, Ohio.

Via’s surname is pronounced “vi,” with the last letter being silent.
