= Dick Allen (bowler) =

Right-handed American ten-pin bowler (born 1978)

Richard Allen
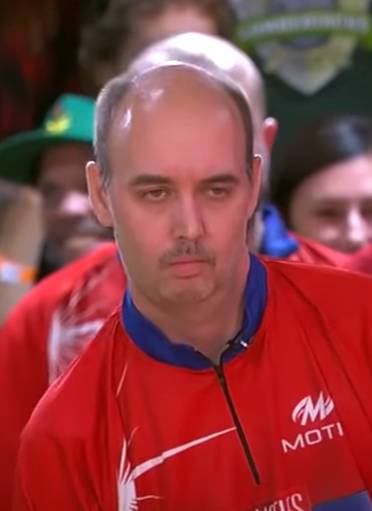
- Allen in 2019

Personal information
- Born: 1978 (age 47–48) Colorado Springs, Colorado, U.S.
- Years active: 1999–present

Bowling Information
- Affiliation: PBA
- Rookie year: 2000
- Dominant hand: Right (power stroker delivery)
- Wins: 7 PBA Tour; 28 PBA Regional Tour
- Sponsors: MOTIV Bowling, Turbo Grips

Richard Allen (born 1978) is a right-handed American professional ten-pin bowler and member of the Professional Bowlers Association (PBA). He competes in events on the PBA Tour and has competed internationally on the World Bowling Tour (WBT). Allen has seven PBA Tour titles and 28 PBA Regional Tour titles. He was known as Ritchie Allen on the PBA Tour until the 2010–11 season.

Allen has been a member of the MOTIV Bowling pro staff since 2012, after previously being sponsored by Ebonite. He is also sponsored by Turbo Grips.

== Professional career ==
Allen became a PBA member in 1999, and bowled in 21 national PBA Tour events between the 2000 and 2001–02 seasons, winning his first title at the 2002 PBA Dallas Open. He then took a break from touring for almost three years, before rejoining the tour full-time in the 2004–05 season. In 2005–06, he cashed in 19 of 21 events, made seven match play rounds, appeared in two televised finals, won his second PBA title at the Motel 6 Phoenix Classic, and cashed a then-career high $90,350.

After a long title drought, Allen won the season-ending Dick Weber PBA Playoffs in 2011, defeating former PBA Player of the Year Chris Barnes in the final match. In 2015, Allen was a member of the champion Silver Lake Atom Splitters PBA League team, and was named League MVP for that season.

Following four more years without a win, Allen’s career had a rebirth in 2017. From 2017 to 2019, he won four PBA Tour titles, the most recent coming in the PBA Cheetah Championship at the 2019 PBA World Series of Bowling. The 2019 season was Allen's first with multiple titles (2), and he cashed a new career high of $94,955.

Allen won the PBA South Region qualifier for the 2021 PBA Players Championship, earning him a spot in the February 21 finals, which offered a PBA record $250,000 first prize. After defeating Tom Smallwood and François Lavoie in stepladder matches, he came up short against top seed Kyle Troup in the championship match, but did earn a $130,000 second place check – more than he had earned in any full season previously.

Allen has made 24 top-five finishes in PBA Tour events, and has a 7–2 record in championship matches. Through 2025, he has earned almost $950,000 in his PBA career.

=== PBA Tour titles ===
1. 2002 Dallas Open (Dallas, TX)
2. 2006 Motel 6 Phoenix Classic (Phoenix, AZ)
3. 2011 Dick Weber PBA Playoffs (Indianapolis, IN)
4. 2017 PBA Xtra Frame Chesapeake Open (Chesapeake, VA)
5. 2018 PBA Xtra Frame Maine Shootout (Portland, ME)
6. 2019 PBA Lubbock Sports Open (Lubbock, TX)
7. 2019 PBA WSOB X Cheetah Championship (Allen Park, MI)

=== Additional honors ===
- 2015 PBA League MVP (with champion Silver Lake Atom Splitters team)

== Style ==
Allen has a high backswing and strong rev rate, but also uses a smooth slide step and release, which most closely aligns him with a power stroker delivery. A natural left-hander until a young age, he bowled with his left hand until the second grade, when he broke that hand. He was forced to use his right hand to bowl, as the cast stayed on for six months. Because of this, Allen had become so accustomed and skilled with using a right-handed delivery, he continued that way.

== Personal information ==
Born in Colorado Springs, Colorado, Allen now lives in Chapin, South Carolina with his wife, Sarah. The couple has two daughters.

On his left arm, Allen has a tattoo of the initials THB, which stands for "typical house bowler." It is a tongue-in-cheek reply to a bowling center pro, who once told Allen he'd never succeed on anything other than league or "house" lane conditions.
