= Rate (company) =

U.S. residential mortgage company

Guaranteed Rate
- Trade name: Rate
- Type: Private
- Industry: Mortgage
- Founded: 2000
- Founder: Victor Ciardelli (CEO & chairman)
- Headquarters: Chicago, Illinois, U.S.
- Number of locations: 850 (Apr. 2021)
- Products: Mortgage
- Number of employees: 5,500 (Apr. 2024)
- Website: rate.com

Guaranteed Rate Companies, doing business as Rate, is an American residential mortgage company headquartered in Chicago, Illinois. Founded in 2000 by Victor Ciardelli, the company had $55 billion in funded volume in 2022, down 25% since 2020. As of 2021, the company had more than 10,000 employees and more than 850 offices nationwide with locations in 50 states. By 2024, the company had shrunk to fewer than 5,500 employees.

== History ==
Former logo as Guaranteed Rate.

Guaranteed Rate was founded in Chicago in 2000 by Victor F. Ciardelli III, a native of Oak Brook, Illinois, who serves as chairman and CEO. Through 2020, the company was the third-largest retail mortgage lender in the US.

Guaranteed Rate Foundation was formed in 2012 to help those in need through difficult times. As of June 2021, the foundation had donated over $5 million in charitable grants.

In 2013, Guaranteed Rate grew to more than $15.9 billion in residential home loans, an increase of $1.2 billion over 2012. This moved the company from the twelfth-largest retail mortgage lender in the U.S. to the tenth-largest.

In 2015, Guaranteed Rate became the eighth-largest retail mortgage lender with volume of more than $18 billion in home loans and was named Lender of the Year by Chicago Agent Magazine.

In March 2016, Guaranteed Rate and one of its loan officers were found guilty in California of diverting loans from Mount Olympus Mortgage, and ordered to pay $25 million in damages to the Irvine, California-based company.

In May, Guaranteed Rate bought the domain name Rate.com for $725,000.

In 2017, Guaranteed Rate entered into a joint venture with Realogy Holdings Corp to form Guaranteed Rate Affinity, in which Guaranteed Rate would provide marketing services to Realogy's subsidiaries, including NRT and Cartus, and would take over some assets of its former joint venture partner, PHH Corporation out of New Jersey. In December, Guaranteed Rate announced plans to sell a minority stake of the company to an affiliate of Boston-based private equity firm Thomas H. Lee Partners. The partial sale was finalized in June 2018. Also in December, a former loan officer sued Guaranteed Rate claiming that he was owed $2 million and that executives at the company were manipulating and misreporting financial information for their own benefit.

In January 2018, Guaranteed Rate announced that its employees' and customers' personal information was in hackers' hands as the result of an email phishing attack. As of October, Guaranteed Rate “[was] bounc[ing] around between the fifth and seventh largest mortgage lender in the [U.S].”

In January 2019, The Wall Street Journal revealed Guaranteed Rate's efforts to boost their Glassdoor ratings. According to the article, the company "pressured employees to write positive reviews in order to raise poor ratings, according to interviews with current and former employees." Prior to these efforts, the company's rating on Glassdoor averaged 2.6 out of 5. In October, Guaranteed Rate partnered with online notary company Notarize to integrate notarization into the online closing process. The company also announced a partnership with Marcus by Goldman Sachs to help customers consolidate debt and fund home improvement projects. Also in 2019, Guaranteed Rate launched a market research platform for potential home buyers to research neighborhood property trends, home prices, demographics, income levels, and school districts.

In April 2020, Guaranteed Rate was required to pay the federal government a $15 million fine to settle a lawsuit brought by a former employee whistleblower who alleged the company pushed its underwriters into endorsing ineligible loans for FHA and VA loan programs and making false statements to "induce the government" to extend insurance coverage. According to the Chicago Tribune, as part of the settlement, Guaranteed Rate admitted that it failed to adhere to self-reporting requirements and certified loans for government insurance that were not eligible. It also admitted to giving FHA underwriters commissions and gifts in violation of the rules. In July, Guaranteed Rate and @Properties launched the joint venture Proper Rate, a Chicago-based independent retail mortgage lender expected to serve as an in-house lender for @Properties. Overall during 2020, Guaranteed Rate originated over 135,000 mortgages with a value of over $47,000,000,000.

In May 2021, it was reported that founder and CEO Victor Ciardelli bought a $38 million mansion in Miami Beach, Florida.

In October 2023, The Wall Street Journal published a report titled "The Mortgage Market Is So Bad Lenders Want Ex-Employees to Give Back Their Bonuses" that detailed Guaranteed Rate's practice of clawing back signing bonuses from loan officers hired in years prior. According to the article, Guaranteed Rate's business dropped by over 50% in 2022 from its high in 2021.

In June 2024, the Chicago Tribune reported in an article titled "Verbal abuse, ‘sex-driven’ culture alleged at Guaranteed Rate" that 80 ex-employees interviewed by the paper said they had experienced or witnessed persistent verbal abuse, a "sex-driven" culture, and a misogynistic atmosphere at the firm and from Victor Ciardelli. Ciardelli expressly denied these allegations, stating such allegations are “simply not true.” The company “has not, does not, and would not objectify women or put them in uncomfortable personal or professional situations." The Tribune reported that "Guaranteed Rate also retained an outside law firm that, even before receiving the reporters’ list of questions, threatened to sue the Tribune for defamation." The suit was never filed. The Tribune also reported that the company was changing its name to Rate, as Ciardelli said "people have trouble spelling 'guaranteed'."

In July 2024, the company officially announced that it would rebrand as simply Rate, with Ciardelli explaining that it reflected the company's "new era" of "making the mortgage process smoother, faster and smarter." The new brand was intended to be phased in across its businesses and sponsorships, and "not affect current operations or mortgage loan officer licenses."

== Acquisitions and layoffs ==
In 2012, Guaranteed Rate acquired Manhattan Mortgage, a residential mortgage brokerage in the New York Metropolitan Area. Founded in 1985 by Melissa L. Cohn, the company employed more than 100 home loan professionals and originated loans in New York, Vermont, Massachusetts, Connecticut, Florida and New Jersey. Cohn later sued Guaranteed Rate and CEO Victor Ciardelli for breach of contract and fraud among other complaints but was unsuccessful. Also in 2012, Guaranteed Rate acquired Massachusetts-based Superior Mortgage.

In 2014, Guaranteed Rate acquired Sun State Home Loans, Nationwide Direct, and Arbor Mortgage in one deal. It also acquired lender FirsTrust Mortgage in Overland Park, Kansas. In November 2018, Guaranteed Rate announced that it would acquire some assets of Honolulu HomeLoans and its affiliate Hawaii Lending Alliance, in order to expand further into the state.

In January 2021, Guaranteed Rate acquired Stearns Holdings, to help the company expand its joint ventures. In February 2021, the company acquired assets of Owning Corporation, a direct-to-consumer mortgage lender. In March 2021, after acquiring AI Foundry of Kodak Alaris, the company launched the mortgage tech company Gateless, which utilizes artificial intelligence and machine learning technologies.

In January 2022, Guaranteed Rate closed Stearns Lending after owning it for one year, laying off 348 employees.

== Sponsorships ==
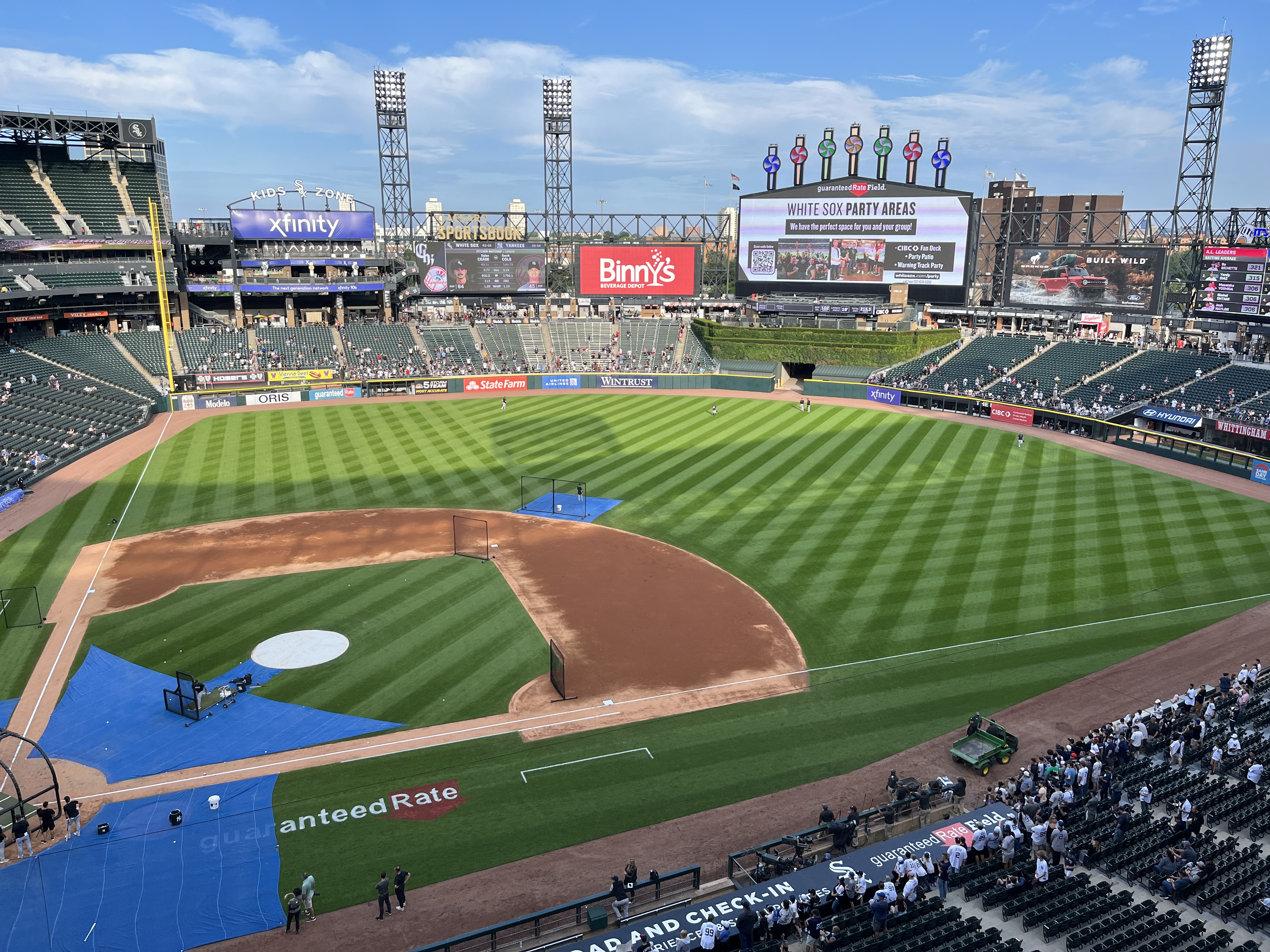
Rate Field in 2023

In August 2016, the Chicago White Sox announced a 13-year agreement with Guaranteed Rate to rename their stadium to Guaranteed Rate Field beginning November 1, 2016. At the time, the Chicago Sun-Times wrote, "There can't be a worse name than Guaranteed Rate Field. Can't be." In December 2024, the stadium's name was shortened to Rate Field following the rebranding.

In 2017, the White Sox and Guaranteed Rate teamed up to create the Guaranteed Impact program, which honors kids who make a positive difference in their community.

On December 17, 2024, the stadium was renamed "Rate Field" due to the company's rebranding.

In August 2020, the company signed a 12-race sponsorship deal with Roush Fenway Racing, to fund Ryan Newman's car through the remainder of the 2020 NASCAR season. They also sponsored Spanish racing driver Álex Palou.

In October 2020, the company became the title sponsor of the Guaranteed Rate Bowl (formerly the Cactus Bowl and Cheez-It Bowl), a college football bowl game played at Chase Field in Phoenix, Arizona. With the company's rebranding, the game was rebranded as the Rate Bowl in 2024.

Also in 2020, the company partnered with the National Hockey League, US Figure Skating, and World TeamTennis as their official mortgage partner. They also sponsored US Figure Skating's National Get Up Day on February 1, 2021.

On January 22, 2021, the company was announced as the title sponsor of the 2021 Professional Bowlers Association Tour. Guaranteed Rate ran a 60-second spot during the Super Bowl LV broadcast on February 7, 2021, featuring mixed martial artist Dustin Poirier, NASCAR driver Ryan Newman, and Erik Weihenmayer, the first blind man to climb to the top of Mount Everest.

== Awards and accolades ==
- Inc. 5000 list of fastest-growing private US companies, each year from 2008 to 2015, and again from 2018 to 2022
- Guaranteed Rate named a top private U.S. job creator by Inc. Magazine
- Guaranteed Rate ranked as a top workplace by the Chicago Tribune in 2012, 2013, 2014, 2015, 2016, 2017, 2018
- Guaranteed Rate was named Top Lender by Chicago Agent Magazine from 2016 to 2020
- Founder and CEO, Victor Ciardelli, III was named an Ernst & Young Entrepreneur of the Year Award winner in 2012
- American Business Award for digital mortgage technology in 2016
- Top Lender for Online Service, U.S. News & World Report, 2018
- Rated as the fourth best mortgage lender by Forbes
