= Perfect game (bowling) =

Highest score possible in a bowling game

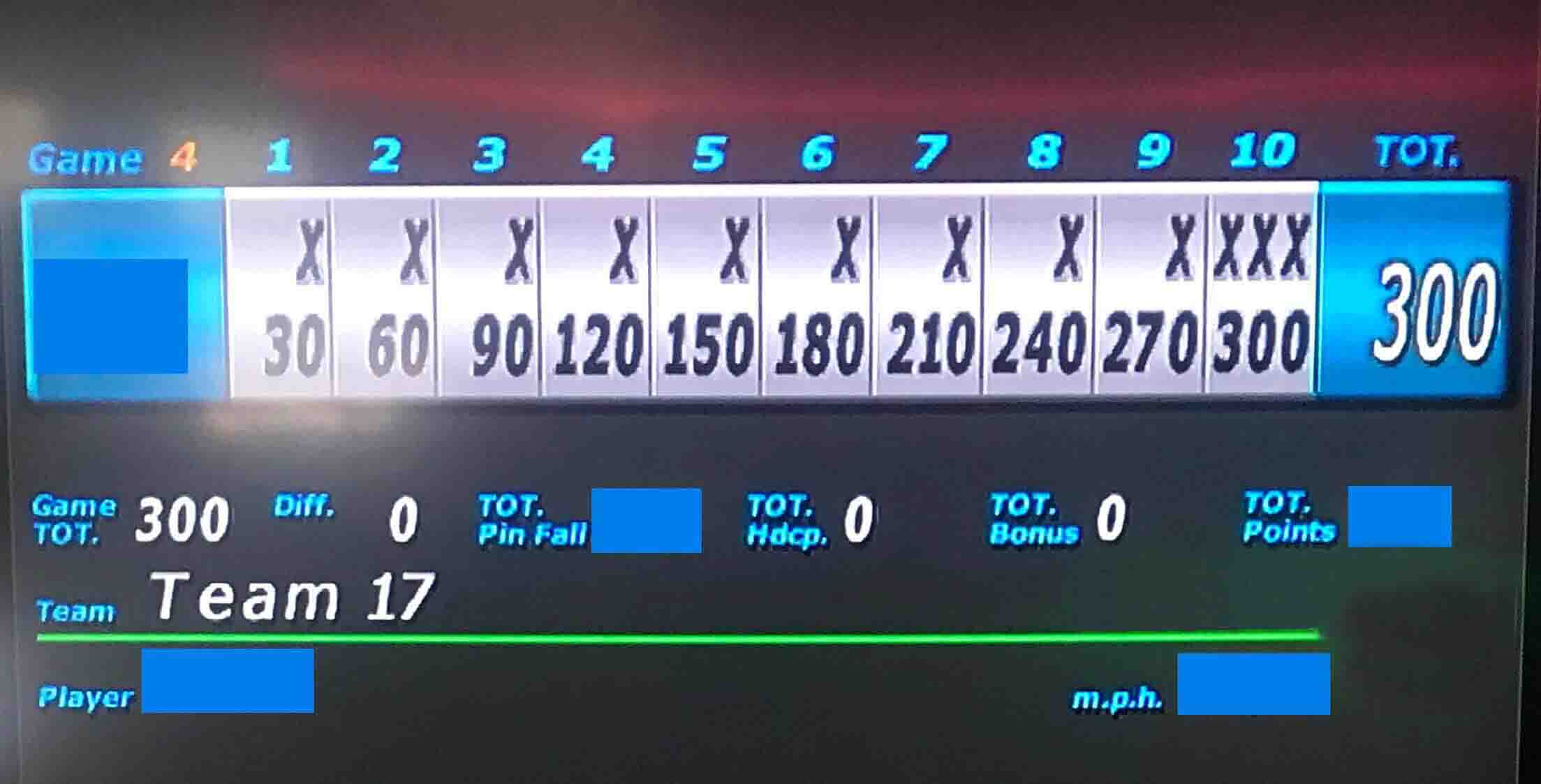
A ten-pin scoresheet showing a perfect game

The number of sanctioned perfect (300) games per league bowler has increased substantially since the 1990s. Freeman and Hatfield posit that the increase in perfect games is due to factors such as the introduction of reactive resin coverstocks, asymmetric ball cores, synthetic lane surfaces, and precision lane oiling machines.

A perfect game is the highest score possible in a game of bowling, achieved by scoring a strike with every throw. In bowling games that use 10 pins, such as ten-pin bowling, candlepin bowling, and duckpin bowling, the highest possible score is 300, achieved by bowling 12 strikes in a row in a traditional single game: one strike in each of the first nine frames, and three more in the tenth frame.

In five-pin bowling, the highest possible score is 450, as a strike is worth 15 pins. It is rare to bowl or witness one. The Canadian Five Pin Bowlers Association approves from 10 to 40 perfect games per year.

== 300 game ==
=== Scoring system ===
The score of a bowling game is the sum of points accumulated across ten frames. Each frame's score includes the number of pins knocked down plus any applicable bonuses earned from strikes and spares scored in the previous frame. Consequently, a frame's final score may not appear immediately. For instance, a strike requires the results of the next two balls to determine the total for that frame. The score displayed in any given frame represents a running total rather than the points scored exclusively within that single frame.

A strike occurs when all ten pins are knocked down on the first ball of a frame. It is worth ten points plus the total number of pins knocked down on the next two balls. For example, a strike followed by a 7 and 2 yields 19 points (10 + 7 + 2). A strike followed by a spare (such as 6 and a 4) yields 20 points (10 + 10). Lastly, a strike followed by two strikes yields 30 points (10 + 10 + 10), which is the maximum value for a single frame.

=== Certification process ===
Before a 300 game is recognized by the certifying body of the league or tournament, a series of tests are conducted by the local or regional bowling association. First, the bowler and league (or tournament) must be in good standing with the organization. In earlier years, the bowling ball(s) used in the scoring was taken for testing (hardness, weighting, and other aspects that would otherwise break the organization's regulations). Also, the lanes used in the scoring were shut down after the last game of the day was completed. The official then used a tape reader to test the oil condition, to make sure it met the organization's regulations. The data was then sent to the certifying body, and the score received a certification decision a few days to a few weeks later.

There are cases where the tests do not meet regulation, and therefore the score is not recognized by the organization. However, the score still counts towards the league or tournament statistics. Modern recognition is much easier; lanes are no longer shut down, balls are no longer taken and inspected. The lanes are inspected once a year, and the ball's make and serial number (USBC only requires that the ball have an engraved serial number, they do not need the actual number) are taken by a league/tournament official and reported to the certifying organization.

=== Recognition ===
In league or tournament play, a certified 300 game is usually commemorated with a ring. Subsequent league 300s are denoted by setting "chips" or precious stones into the ring, so that skilled bowlers do not have to wear several rings. The United States Bowling Congress (USBC) offers a "multiple" 300 ring for an additional fee that features the number of approved 300 games for that bowler surrounded by stones. The ring can be returned to have the number changed as the bowler rolls additional perfect games.

In casual or "open" play, a 300 game is not recognized officially by any certifying, professional, or other organization, but may be honored by other means within the bowling center, such as a plaque, trophy, "wall of fame" photo, or other prize.

=== Televised 300 games ===
A handful of 300 games have been broadcast on television broadcasts. Grazio Castellano of Brooklyn, New York, was the first to roll a 300 game on live television. This occurred on October 4, 1953, during an Eastern All-Star league session in Newark, New Jersey. (Castellano is a member of the United States Bowling Congress Hall of Fame.) A more recent example came in October 2006, when England's Paul Moor became the first man to register a score of 300 in the Weber Cup (the first 300 on live British television), the annual team challenge event between the United States and Europe. Australian Jason Belmonte became the first bowler to ever roll a 300 game in the televised finals of the World Tenpin Masters, defeating Moor in the 2007 event. Tommy Jones had shot a perfect game in each Weber Cup from 2007 to 2009. Shota Kawazoe has rolled back-to-back 300 games on live Japanese television.

A bowler that bowls a perfect game on a televised PBA Tour event receives a $10,000 bonus, although the PBA and/or its sponsors have occasionally offered as much as a $1 million bonus for a player that bowls a 300 game in selected televised events. Through the 2026 season, there have been 36 televised 300 games in title events on the PBA Tour, and two more on the PBA50 Tour. The first 300 game in a televised PBA event was rolled by Jack Biondolillo in the opening match of the 1967 Firestone Tournament of Champions finals (broadcast by ABC). This was also the first nationally televised broadcast of a perfect game. The most recent perfect game in a U.S. telecast of a PBA Tour event happened in the PBA Players Championship on The CW, held February 22, 2026. Brandon Bonta defeated E. J. Tackett in the final, 300-238.

Sean Rash rolled the PBA's 23rd and 25th 300 games to become the first player with multiple televised perfect games in PBA Tour stops. Canadian François Lavoie, having previously bowled the PBA Tour's 26th televised 300 game, joined Rash when he bowled the Tour's 29th in 2020. Chris Via rolled two 300 games, making him the third member of this exclusive club. (Via is the only player of the three to roll both of his 300 games in the same season.) Mika Koivuniemi narrowly missed (as well as becoming the first to do so) joining this exclusive club. Having rolled the PBA's 17th televised perfect game in 2003, Mika shot a 299 game in the semifinals of the 2011 PBA Tournament of Champions. Belmonte's 2022 PBA Tour Finals championship match 1 300 game made him the fourth (21st in 2012 and 34th in 2022).

There have been five 300 games in PBA-sanctioned challenge events or team competitions that are not part of the PBA Tour. In 2009, Wes Malott rolled two 300 games in the PBA-sanctioned King of Bowling series televised on ESPN. Ryan Shafer, who earlier in his career rolled the PBA's 19th televised 300 in a PBA Tour event, threw his second televised 300 game in a singles match at the Geico PBA Team Shootout, a made-for-TV event broadcast on ESPN, July 2, 2011. On May 21, 2023, E. J. Tackett rolled a 300 game in the PBA-sanctioned Super Slam Cup on Fox, which was restricted to the winners of the five major tournaments (and if necessary, runners-up if a bowler who had previously won a major won a second major in the season). In addition, PBA Hall of Famer Chris Barnes, who rolled the PBA's 22nd televised 300 game, has also rolled live perfect games on European television (2014 QubicaAMF World Cup) and Japanese television (2015 PBA-DHC Japan Invitational). On April 3, 2016 (broadcast May 1, 2016), a PBA League broadcast featured the PBA's first Baker format 300 game, rolled by Norm Duke, Shawn Maldonado, BJ Moore, Bill O'Neill and Tommy Jones.

Female bowlers have also achieved perfection in front of a television audience. Ritsuko Nakayama of the Japan Professional Bowling Association became the first woman to score a perfect game in front of a national television audience, doing so in Japan on August 21, 1970. Michelle Feldman of the Professional Women's Bowling Association (PWBA) became the first woman to score a 300 on American national television, when she accomplished the feat in a 1997 Prime Sports broadcast. Cara Honeychurch, Liz Johnson and Dasha Kovalova have also bowled 300 games in PWBA events on American TV. Urara Himeji, Wendy Macpherson and Takiko Naganawa have rolled 300 games on Japanese national television, all during JPBA events.

The following is a list of all perfect 300 games in nationally televised PBA Tour title events (PBA Hall of Famers marked with an asterisk; major tournaments in bold text):

No.	Player	Event	Air Date	Location	Opponent	Bonus (USD)	Notes & Trivia
1	Jack Biondolillo	**Firestone Tournament of Champions**	April 1, 1967	Akron, Ohio	Les Schissler	$10,000	-First 300 game in a nationally televised bowling event
2	Johnny Guenther*	San Jose Open	February 1, 1969	San Jose, California	Don Johnson*	$10,000	
3	Jim Stefanich*	Midas Open	January 5, 1974	Alameda, California	Glenn Carlson	$10,000	
4	Pete McCordic	Greater Los Angeles Open	January 31, 1987	Torrance, California	Wayne Webb*	$100,000	-Ended the longest drought between televised PBA 300 games (13 years); -First $100,000 bonus for bowling a televised 300
5	Bob Benoit	Quaker State Open	January 23, 1988	Grand Prairie, Texas	Mark Roth*	**$100,000**	-First televised 300 game shot in a title match
6	Mike Aulby*	Wichita Open	July 31, 1993	Wichita, Kansas	David Ozio*	$10,000	-First televised 300 by a left-handed bowler; -Second televised 300 game shot in a title match; -Set record for combined score in a title match (579 total pins; Ozio shot 279)
7	Johnny Petraglia*	**PBA National Championship**	March 5, 1994	Toledo, Ohio	Walter Ray Williams, Jr.*	**$100,000**	-Oldest player (47) to bowl 300 in a televised PBA Tour event
8	Butch Soper	Hilton Hotels Classic	July 12, 1994	Reno, Nevada	Bob Benoit	$10,000	-First PBA season with multiple televised 300 games; -First time a 300 was bowled on TV to beat another player who had previously bowled a 300 on TV (Benoit, 1988)
9	C.K. Moore	Columbia 300 Open	February 2, 1996	Austin, Texas	Parker Bohn III	$25,000	-First bowler to roll a 300 game in his TV debut (was Moore's first ever game on TV)
10	Bob Learn Jr.	Flagship Open	April 6, 1996	Erie, Pennsylvania	Johnny Petraglia	$100,000	-Highest four-game pinfall in a PBA Tour telecast (300, 270, 280, 279 = 1,129 total); -Second time a 300 was bowled on TV to beat another player who had previously bowled a 300 on TV (Petraglia, 1994) (to date, both events are the only $100,000 bonus prizes); -Tied record for combined score in a televised match (579 total pins; Petraglia shot 279)
11	Jason Queen	**USBC Masters**	May 3, 1997	Huntsville, Alabama	Bobby Fleetwood	None	-Last year before the tournament was recognized as a PBA event. Declared a major in 2000; -Retroactively added in 2008 after the PBA announced all members who had won the American Bowling Congress Masters (renamed United States Bowling Congress Masters in 2005 after the consolidation of the men's, women's, and youth bowling sanctioning bodies) winners prior to 1998 were credited with a PBA win; -No bonus was awarded for this perfect game as it was not a PBA event at the time (the sponsor, Contour Power Grips, would only provide a 300-game bonus if a bowler was wearing their company patch; Queen was not wearing said patch during his 300 game)
12	Steve Hoskins*	Ebonite Challenge 2	October 15, 1997	Rochester, New York	Walter Ray Williams, Jr. (2)	$10,000	-Williams, Jr.: first bowler to lose to a 300-game on TV multiple times
13	Parker Bohn III*	**USBC Masters**	May 9, 1998	Reno, Nevada	Chris Sand & Michael Mullin	$10,000	-Bohn: first bowler to have previously lost to a 300-game on TV (1996 vs. C.K. Moore) who later accomplished the same feat for a win; -Unlike the previous year, this counted as a PBA win originally, as the USBC Masters was officially a PBA Tour event starting in 1998. The PBA paid the $10,000 bonus.
14	Steve Jaros	Chattanooga Open	February 13, 1999	Chattanooga, Tennessee	Ricky Ward	$10,000	
15	Mike Miller	National Bowling Stadium Open	June 20, 1999	Reno, Nevada	Danny Weisman* & Tim Criss	$10,000	
16	Norm Duke*	GEICO Earl Anthony Classic	January 5, 2003	Tacoma, Washington	Walter Ray Williams, Jr. (3)	$10,000	-Williams, Jr.: first bowler to lose to a 300-game on TV 3 times
17	Mika Koivuniemi*	PBA Cambridge Credit Classic	December 7, 2003	Windsor Locks, Connecticut	Jason Couch*	$20,000	-First PBA televised 300 game by a player born outside of the United States
18	Tony Reyes	Motor City Classic	November 5, 2006	Taylor, Michigan	Parker Bohn III (2)	$10,000	-Bohn: second bowler to lose to a 300-game on TV multiple times; -Third time a 300 was bowled on TV to beat another player who had previously bowled a 300 on TV (Bohn, 1998)
19	Ryan Shafer	Pepsi Championship	March 18, 2007	Indianapolis, Indiana	Jeff Carter	$10,000	-Set a PBA TV record with 18 consecutive strikes in the same telecast.
20	Rhino Page	Dydo Japan Cup	April 25, 2009	Tokyo, Japan	Jeong Tae-Hwa	$10,000	-First televised 300 game in a PBA event held outside of the United States
21	Jason Belmonte	**PBA World Championship**	January 15, 2012	Las Vegas, Nevada	Mike Fagan & Brian Kretzer	$10,000	-Tape-delayed broadcast (rolled November 18, 2011)
22	Chris Barnes*	WSOB GEICO Shark Open	March 4, 2012	Las Vegas, Nevada	Sean Rash & Jason Belmonte	$10,000	-Tape-delayed broadcast (rolled November 19, 2011)
23	Sean Rash	PBA Wolf Open	June 3, 2014	Shawnee, Oklahoma	Chris Loschetter	$10,000	-Tape-delayed broadcast (rolled May 24, 2014); -Rash: second bowler to have previously lost to a 300-game on TV (2012 vs. Chris Barnes) who later accomplished the same feat for a win
24	Ronnie Russell	WSOB Chameleon Championship	December 28, 2014	Las Vegas, Nevada	Sean Rash (2) & JR Raymond	$10,000	-Tape-delayed broadcast (rolled November 2, 2014); -Fourth time a 300 was bowled on TV to beat another player who had previously bowled a 300 on TV (Rash, 2014); -Rash: third bowler to lose to a 300-game on TV multiple times
25	Sean Rash (2)	**Barbasol PBA Tournament of Champions**	February 15, 2015	Indianapolis, Indiana	Ryan Ciminelli	$10,000	-First player with multiple televised PBA 300 games
26	François Lavoie	**U.S. Open**	November 9, 2016	Las Vegas, Nevada	Shawn Maldonado	$10,000	-First 300 game in the televised finals of the U.S. Open
27	Tommy Jones*	PBA Hall of Fame Classic	January 19, 2020	Arlington, Texas	Darren Tang	$10,000	-Third televised 300 game shot in a title match; -First televised 300 on a mixed oil pattern (left and right lanes had different lengths and layouts of oil) -Jones had bowled as part of a Baker format 300 game in 2016.
28	Jakob Butturff	PBA Tour Finals	July 18, 2020	Jupiter, Florida	Norm Duke, Sean Rash (3), & Anthony Simonsen	$10,000	-First time a televised 300 game was bowled against two bowlers at the same time who had also bowled televised 300 games (Duke, 2003; Rash, 2014-15); -Fifth time a 300 was bowled on TV to beat another player who had previously bowled a 300 on TV (Duke, 2003; Rash, 2014-15)
29	François Lavoie (2)	PBA Tour Playoffs	October 11, 2020	Centreville, Virginia	Sean Rash (4)	$10,000	-Second player with multiple televised PBA 300 games (the first was Rash); -First PBA season with three televised 300 games; -Rash: involved in the most televised 300 games combined (6 total: 2 for, 4 against)
30	Chris Via	**PBA Players Championship**	February 7, 2021	Jupiter, Florida	Tim Foy, Jr.	$10,000	
31	Sam Cooley	PBA Tour Playoffs	May 16, 2021	Milford, Connecticut	Kyle Troup	$10,000	
32	Chris Via (2)	PBA Tour Finals	June 27, 2021	Allen Park, Michigan	E. J. Tackett	$10,000	-First player with multiple televised 300 games in the same season; -Third player with multiple televised PBA 300 games
33	Kyle Troup	PBA Tour Finals	June 5, 2022	Arlington, Washington	Kris Prather	$10,000	-Second televised 300 on a mixed oil pattern (left and right lanes had different lengths and layouts of oil); -Troup: third bowler to have previously lost to a 300-game on TV (2021 vs. Sam Cooley) who later accomplished the same feat for a win
34	Jason Belmonte (2)	PBA Tour Finals	June 5, 2022	Arlington, Washington	Dom Barrett	$10,000	-First televised PBA event with multiple 300 games -Fourth player with multiple televised PBA 300 games -Fourth televised 300 game shot in a title match -Third televised 300 on a mixed oil pattern (left and right lanes had different lengths and layouts of oil) -Longest gap between first and second televised 300 games (10 years)
35	Jason Belmonte (3)	PBA Tour Finals	June 25, 2023	Arlington, Washington	Kris Prather (2)	$10,000	-Fourth televised 300 on a mixed oil pattern (left and right lanes had different lengths and layouts of oil); -First bowler to record three televised perfect games; -Prather: fourth bowler to lose to a 300-game on TV multiple times
36	Brandon Bonta	**PBA Players Championship**	February 22, 2026	Arlington, Texas	E. J. Tackett (2)	$10,000	-Bonta made his professional debut at PBA Players Championship. He is the second player (after Bob Benoit in 1988) to roll a championship game 300 in his TV debut, and the fifth to roll 300 in any game of a TV debut. -Tackett: fifth bowler to lose to a 300-game on TV multiple times -Fifth televised 300 shot in the championship match -Fifth televised 300 on a mixed oil pattern (left and right lanes had different lengths and layouts of oil) -PBA Tour premiere on The CW

=== Andy Varipapa 300 ===
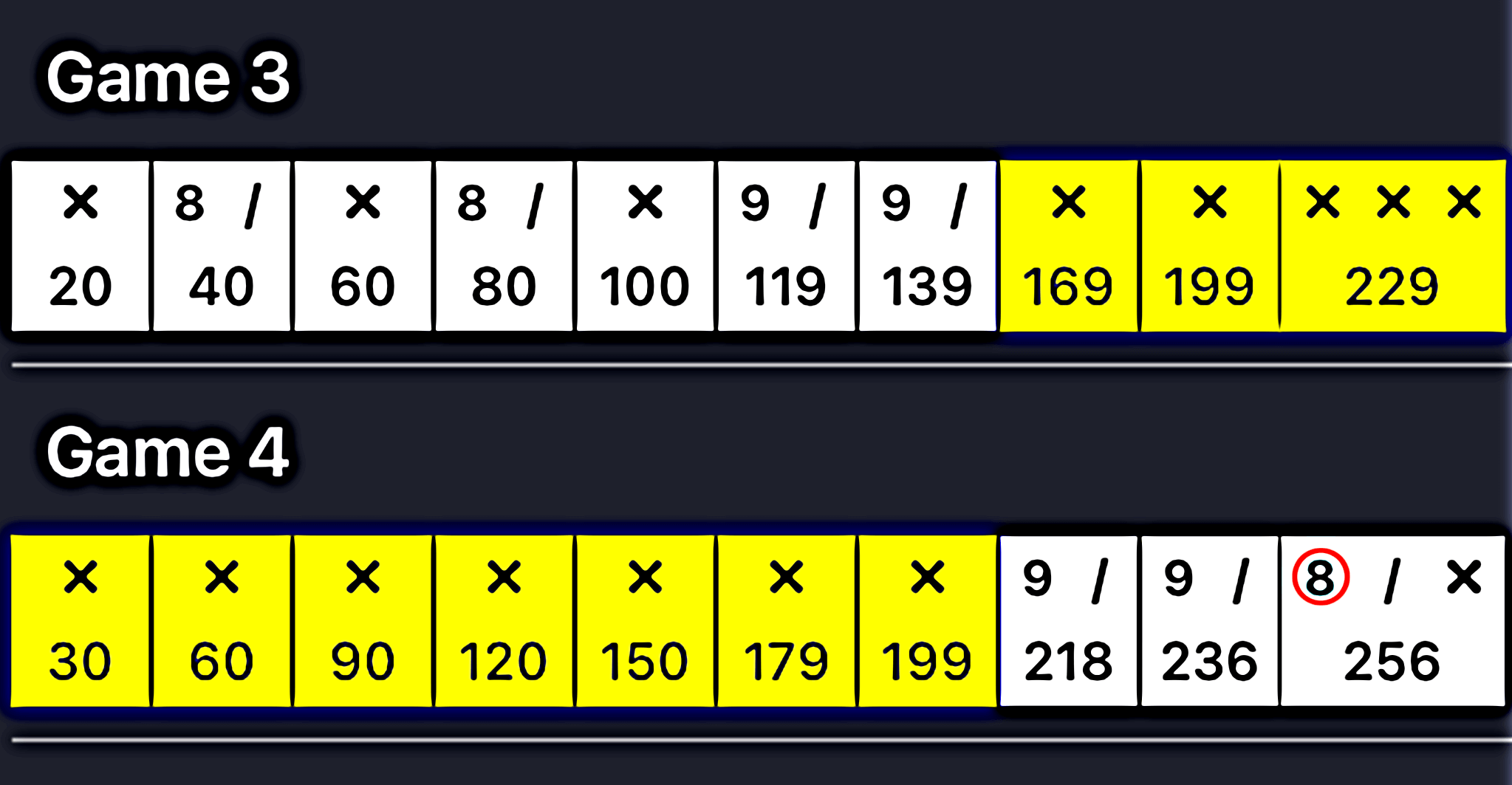
An "Andy Varipapa 300" game, highlighted in yellow

Andy Varipapa, a standout bowler from the 1930s and 1940s, joked about a 300 game being twelve strikes in a row spanning two games. Hence, such a result is named after the veteran bowler.

=== Back-to-back ===
On August 31, 2010, 75-year-old Will June, grandfather of Cato June, became the oldest player to bowl consecutive perfect games.

=== Perfect series ===
A 900 series, a three-game set with scores adding up to 900, is a more difficult feat to achieve than bowling a single perfect game because it requires more consistency and careful attention to the subtle changes in the lane conditions from game to game. The first six 900 series reported, starting with PBA Hall of Famer Glenn Allison's in 1982, were all rejected by the USBC for various reasons – mostly due to nonconforming lane conditions. Finally, in 1997, an officially certified 900 series was bowled by collegiate bowler Jeremy Sonnenfeld, rolled at Sun Valley Lanes in Lincoln, Nebraska. It was the first 900 series approved by the USBC. Twelve perfect series were bowled in the ten-year period 1997–2008, and six were bowled in the two years 2009–2010. As of November 12, 2026, the USBC lists a total of 45 officially certified 900 series by 44 different bowlers, with Robert Mushtare the only person to roll more than one.

== In fiction ==
The concept of a perfect bowling game has been regularly used in fiction for either suspenseful or comedic effect.

- In a season 4 episode of Married... with Children, "Peggy Turns 300," Peggy bowls a perfect game immediately after Al breaks the record at their local alley.
- In one episode of Camp Lazlo, Scout Master Lumpus builds his own personal bowling lane and attempts to bowl a perfect game, but as usual, Lazlo and his friends Raj and Clam come along and foil it, in curiosity of what he's doing.
- In one episode of The Flintstones, an invisible Barney helps Fred bowl a "perfect game" by knocking/kicking aside all the pins whenever Fred bowls the ball.
- In the episode "Bowling" of Malcolm in the Middle, Hal almost bowls a perfect game, but Malcolm accidentally gets caught in the pinsetter and is dropped onto the pins on the 12th roll. Although the computer claims that Hal bowled a perfect game (since Malcolm did knock all the pins over), the game is dismissed by the gathered crowd.
- In an episode of Hill Street Blues, the roll call sergeant had bowled a 300 game. After the bowling alley burned down, the sergeant was an arson suspect because his 300 was not league certified.
- In the 1998 movie The Big Lebowski, the character of Jesus Quintana (John Turturro) is seen wearing three perfect game rings.
- In The Simpsons episode "Hello Gutter, Hello Fadder", Homer bowls a perfect game in a parody of The Natural. Later, the baby Maggie also apparently bowls one.
- An episode of The Andy Griffith Show titled "Howard the Bowler" features a bowling match between Mayberry and neighboring Mt. Pilot. Howard is one strike away from a perfect game, only to have the lights go out due to a power overload. He has a day to think about it before he tries for the final strike. They make bets on him bowling a perfect game, and when he returns he gets two practice frames before making his final attempt. Both are gutter balls, so Andy gets the guys to relinquish the bets. With the pressure relieved, Howard makes the final strike for a perfect game.
- In a similar 2001 episode of the series According to Jim, Jim (James Belushi) bowls the first 11 strikes of a game when the power goes out at the bowling center. It is the day before Thanksgiving, and the proprietor tells Jim he cannot get credit for a 300 game (nor a photo on the center's "wall of fame") if he leaves and returns. Jim spends the night, and his wife, Cheryl (Courtney Thorne-Smith), surprises him by bringing Thanksgiving dinner to the bowling center while he waits for the power to return. Cheryl and Jim's family light the lane by placing candles in the gutters, and Jim rolls the final strike to complete the 300 game.
- In the episode "Bowling for Votes" of the series Parks and Recreation, Ron Swanson bowls a perfect game by rolling the ball with two hands from between his legs.
- In the episode "Blind Ambition" of the series Family Guy, where Peter becomes jealous of his friends' achievements, Mort Goldman bowls a perfect game despite rolling the ball so slowly it takes several seconds to reach the pins.
- In an episode "Lawmen" of the series Lethal Weapon, Roger (Damon Wayans) has his photo on the "wall of fame" in a local bowling center for a 300-game (which he admits was only a 290), but was pushed to roll a perfect game to prove it.
- Scoring a 300 game is a common objective in most bowling video games, which often offer unique or rare rewards for the player, as well as a large increase of the player's level.
- In the first episode of the anime Shikimori's Not Just a Cutie, Shikimori, the main female character in the anime and manga series, bowled a perfect 300 in a friendly match against her friends: Kyo Nekozaki, Yui Hachimitsu, Shu Inuzuka, and Izumi, her boyfriend.

== See also ==
- Golden Set in tennis
- Maximum break and century break in snooker
- Nine dart finish in darts
- Perfect game in baseball
- Immaculate inning in baseball
- Golden break in nine-ball pool
