= 1994 PBA Tour season =

PBA Bowling Tour: 1994 Season
- League: Professional Bowlers Association
- Sport: Ten-pin bowling
- Duration: January 18 – December 11, 1994

PBA Tour
- Season MVP: Norm Duke

PBA Tour seasons
- ← 1993 1995 →

This is a recap of the 1994 season for the Professional Bowlers Association (PBA) Tour. It was the tour's 36th season, and consisted of 30 events.

History was made at the PBA National Championship when, for the first time, two brothers faced each other for a PBA title. David Traber defeated his elder brother, Dale, to take his first PBA title and first major. In the same tournament, 47-year-old Johnny Petraglia rolled the PBA's seventh televised 300 game before being defeated by Dale Traber in the next match. Butch Soper would toss the PBA's eighth televised 300 game later in the season at the Hilton Hotels Classic.

Justin Hromek made his second-ever PBA Tour victory count, winning the BPAA U.S. Open. Norm Duke captured the Tournament of Champions among his five titles for the season, and was voted PBA Player of the year.

During the season, Pete Weber became the PBA's career money leader, surpassing Hall of Famer Marshall Holman.

== Tournament schedule ==
Event	Bowling center	City	Dates	Winner
AC-Delco Classic	Cal Bowl	Lakewood, California	Jan 18–22	Norm Duke (5)
Showboat Invitational	Showboat Bowling Center	Las Vegas, Nevada	Jan 23–29	Walter Ray Williams, Jr. (14)
Quaker State Open	Forum Bowling Lanes	Grand Prairie, Texas	Feb 1–5	Steve Hoskins (2)
Choice Hotels Classic	Boulevard Bowl	Edmond, Oklahoma	Feb 6–12	Norm Duke (6)
Bud Light Hall of Fame Championship	Tropicana Lanes	Richmond Heights, Missouri	Feb 15–19	Andy Neuer (1)
True Value Open	Landmark Recreation Center	Peoria, Illinois	Feb 22–26	Bryan Goebel (3)
PBA National Championship	Ducat's Imperial Lanes	Toledo, Ohio	Feb 27 – Mar 5	David Traber (1)
Brunswick Johnny Petraglia Open	Carolier Lanes	North Brunswick, New Jersey	Mar 8–12	Norm Duke (7)
Leisure's Long Island Open	Sayville Bowl	Sayville, New York	Mar 15–19	Amleto Monacelli (14)
Tums Classic	Bradley Bowl	Windsor Locks, Connecticut	Mar 22–26	Harry Sullins (5)
Splitfire Spark Plug Open	Erie Civic Center	Erie, Pennsylvania	Mar 29 – Apr 2	Dennis Horan (1)
BPAA U.S. Open	Bowl One	Troy, Michigan	Apr 3–9	Justin Hromek (2)
IOF Foresters Bowling for Miracles Open	Club 300 Bowl	Markham, Ontario	Apr 11–16	Mike Edwards (1)
Tournament of Champions	Riviera Lanes	Fairlawn, Ohio	Apr 19–23	Norm Duke (8)
Northwest Classic	Celebrity Bowl	Kennewick, Washington	Jun 24–28	Dave Husted (9)
PBA Oregon Open	Hollywood Bowl	Portland, Oregon	Jul 1–5	Dave D'Entremont (2)
Hilton Hotels Classic	Reno Hilton Bowling Center	Reno, Nevada	Jul 8–12	John Mazza (5)
Active West Open	Active West Thunderbird Lanes	Ontario, California	Jul 15–19	Bryan Goebel (4)
Tucson PBA Open	Golden Pin Lanes	Tucson, Arizona	Jul 22–26	Steve Hoskins (3)
Sherwin Williams Classic	Brunswick Ambassador Lanes	Bedford, Ohio	Aug 12–16	Dave Husted (10)
Greater Harrisburg Open	ABC West Lanes	Mechanicsburg, Pennsylvania	Aug 19–23	Randy Pedersen (10)
Greater Lexington Classic	Collins Bowling Center-Eastland	Lexington, Kentucky	Aug 26–30	Amleto Monacelli (15)
Oronamin C Japan Cup	Tokyo Port Bowl	Tokyo, Japan	Sep 22–25	Brian Voss (14)
AMF Dick Weber Classic	AMF Major League Lanes	Richmond, Virginia	Sep 30 – Oct 5	John Mazza (6)
Touring Players Championship	Woodland Bowl	Indianapolis, Indiana	Oct 8–12	Walter Ray Williams, Jr. (15)
Greater Detroit Open	Taylor Lanes	Taylor, Michigan	Oct 15–19	Bryan Goebel (5)
Rochester Open	Marcel's Olympic Bowl	Rochester, New York	Oct 22–26	Norm Duke (9)
Great Lakes Open	Spectrum Lanes	Wyoming, Michigan	Oct 29 – Nov 2	Dave Ferraro (10)
Brunswick Memorial World Open	Brunswick Deer Park Lanes	Lake Zurich, Illinois	Nov 3–9	Eric Forkel (3)
Merit Mixed Doubles Championship	Hilton Lanes	Reno, Nevada	Dec 8–11	Bryan Goebel (6), Aleta Sill
