= 1992 PBA Tour season =

PBA Bowling Tour: 1992 Season
- League: Professional Bowlers Association
- Sport: Ten-pin bowling
- Duration: January 7 – November 11, 1992

PBA Tour
- Season MVP: Dave Ferraro

PBA Tour seasons
- ← 1991 1993 →

This is a recap of the 1992 season for the Professional Bowlers Association (PBA) Tour. It was the tour's 34th season, and consisted of 35 events.

The 1992 season featured 12 first-time winners, including a stretch of five straight weeks in January–February where previous non-winners took home all of the titles.

Eric Forkel, who won his first PBA title earlier in the season, won his second at the Bud Light PBA National Championship. Robert Lawrence was victorious at the BPAA U.S. Open, while PBA President Marc McDowell captured the Firestone Tournament of Champions and was named Bowling Writers Association of America Male Bowler of the Year.

Though he won only two titles on the year and was shut out in majors, Dave Ferraro made numerous TV finals and finished high on the points, average and earnings lists, all of which helped him garner PBA Player of the Year honors.

Jim Pencak, who had gone undefeated in his first 15 career televised matches (a PBA record), ran his streak to 16 in the semi-final of the ABC West Lanes Open before losing in the final match to Bob Vespi.

== Tournament schedule ==
| Event | Bowling center | City | Dates | Winner |
|---|---|---|---|---|
| AC-Delco Classic | Gable House Bowl | Torrance, California | Jan 7–11 | Marc McDowell (3) |
| Showboat Invitational | Showboat Bowling Center | Las Vegas, Nevada | Jan 12–18 | Harry Sullins (4) |
| ARC Sacramento Open | Mardi Gras Lanes | Sacramento, California | Jan 21–25 | Mike Scroggins (1) |
| Quaker State Open | Forum Bowling Lanes | Grand Prairie, Texas | Jan 28 – Feb 1 | Alan Bishop (1) |
| Flagship City Open | Eastway Lanes | Erie, Pennsylvania | Feb 4–8 | Eric Forkel (1) |
| True Value Open | Landmark Recreation Center | Peoria, Illinois | Feb 10–15 | Bruce Hamilton (1) |
| Fair Lanes Open | Fair Lanes Woodlawn | Baltimore, Maryland | Feb 17–22 | Bob Learn, Jr. (1) |
| Florida Open | Cypress Lanes | Winter Haven, Florida | Feb 24–29 | Chris Warren (5) |
| Paula Carter's Homestead Classic | Paula Carter's Pro Bowl-Homestead | Homestead, Florida | Mar 2–7 | Brian Voss (12) |
| Johnny Petraglia Open | Carolier Lanes | North Brunswick, New Jersey | Mar 9–14 | Dave Ferraro (8) |
| Cleveland Open | Yorktown Lanes | Parma Heights, Ohio | Mar 16–21 | Steve Cook (15) |
| Bud Light PBA National Championship | Imperial Lanes | Toledo, Ohio | Mar 22–28 | Eric Forkel (2) |
| Toyota Long Island Open | Sayville Bowl | Sayville, New York | Mar 30 – Apr 4 | Del Ballard, Jr. (10) |
| BPAA U.S. Open | Roseland Bowl | Canandaigua, New York | Apr 5–11 | Robert Lawrence (3) |
| Tums Classic | Bradley Bowl | Windsor Locks, Connecticut | Apr 13–18 | Jimmy Keeth (1) |
| Firestone Tournament of Champions | Riviera Lanes | Fairlawn, Ohio | Apr 21–25 | Marc McDowell (4) |
| Earl Anthony PBA Open | Earl Anthony's Dublin Bowl | Dublin, California | May 19–23 | Mike Shady (1) |
| Seattle Open | Skyway Park Bowl | Seattle, Washington | May 25–30 | Eric Adolphson (1) |
| PBA Oregon Open | Hollywood Bowl | Portland, Oregon | Jun 2–6 | Del Ballard, Jr. (11) |
| Active West PBA Open | Active West Town Square Lanes | Riverside, California | Jun 8–13 | Dave Ferraro (9) |
| Fresno Open | Cedar Lanes | Fresno, California | Jun 16–20 | Dave D'Entremont (1) |
| El Paso Open | Bowl El Paso | El Paso, Texas | Jun 23–27 | Parker Bohn III (6) |
| Tucson PBA Open | Golden Pin Lanes | Tucson, Arizona | Jun 30 – Jul 4 | Bob Vespi (1) |
| Wichita Open | Northrock Lanes | Wichita, Kansas | Jul 7–11 | Mike Miller (2) |
| Choice Hotels Summer Classic | Boulevard Bowl | Edmond, Oklahoma | Jul 12–18 | Amleto Monacelli (12) |
| Beaumont PBA Doubles Classic | Crossroads Bowling Center | Beaumont, Texas | Jul 19–23 | Parker Bohn III (7), Hugh Miller (6) |
| Columbia 300 Open | Astro Bowling Center | San Antonio, Texas | Jul 26–30 | Roger Bowker (3) |
| Senior/Touring Pro Doubles | St. Clair Bowl | Belleville, Illinois | Aug 2–6 | Dick Weber (28), Justin Hromek (1) |
| Green Bay Classic | Red Carpet Lanes | Green Bay, Wisconsin | Aug 9–13 | Mike Aulby (20) |
| ABC West Lanes Open | ABC West Lanes | Mechanicsburg, Pennsylvania | Aug 15–20 | Bob Vespi (2) |
| Oronamin C Japan Cup | Tokyo Port Bowl | Tokyo, Japan | Oct 8–11 | Parker Bohn III (8) |
| Bud Light Touring Players Championship | Woodland Bowl | Indianapolis, Indiana | Oct 17–21 | Pete Weber (19) |
| Rochester Open | Marcel's Olympic Bowl | Rochester, New York | Oct 24–28 | Marc McDowell (5) |
| Taylor Lanes Open | Taylor Lanes | Taylor, Michigan | Oct 31 – Nov 4 | Amleto Monacelli (13) |
| Brunswick Memorial World Open | Brunswick Deer Park Lanes | Lake Zurich, Illinois | Nov 5–11 | Jeff Lizzi (1) |
