= 1993 PBA Tour season =

PBA Bowling Tour: 1993 Season
- League: Professional Bowlers Association
- Sport: Ten-pin bowling
- Duration: January 5 – December 5, 1993

PBA Tour
- Season MVP: Walter Ray Williams, Jr.

PBA Tour seasons
- ← 1992 1994 →

This is a recap of the 1993 season for the Professional Bowlers Association (PBA) Tour. It was the tour's 35th season, and consisted of 35 events.

PBA Player of the Year Walter Ray Williams, Jr. dominated the season with seven victories and a 299 game in the first match in the Leisure's Long Island open against Robert Lawrence, while leading nearly every statistical category. He had a good chance to tie Mark Roth's 1978 single-season record of eight titles, having collected an additional four runner-up finishes during the year.

Ron Palombi, Jr. captured his second career major title at the Bud Light PBA National Championship. Del Ballard, Jr. became the PBA's third two-time winner of the modern-day BPAA U.S. Open, joining Marshall Holman and Pete Weber.

George Branham III made history in what would be the final Firestone Tournament of Champions, becoming the first African American to win a PBA major. Prior to the tournament, the PBA announced that General Tire would be taking over sponsorship of the ToC, which had been sponsored by Firestone Tire since 1965.

Mike Aulby rolled the PBA's sixth televised 300 game at the Wichita Open, defeating David Ozio 300–279 in the highest-scoring TV match in PBA history.

== Tournament schedule ==
| Event | Bowling center | City | Dates | Winner |
|---|---|---|---|---|
| AC-Delco Classic | Gable House Bowl | Torrance, California | Jan 5–9 | Ron Williams (3) |
| Phoenix Open | Fair Lanes Squaw Peak | Phoenix, Arizona | Jan 12–16 | Parker Bohn III (9) |
| Showboat Invitational | Showboat Bowling Center | Las Vegas, Nevada | Jan 17–23 | Mike Aulby (21) |
| Quaker State Open | Forum Bowling Lanes | Grand Prairie, Texas | Jan 25–30 | Steve Hoskins (1) |
| True Value Open | Landmark Recreation Center | Peoria, Illinois | Feb 2–6 | John Mazza (4) |
| Bud Light Hall of Fame Championship | Tropicana Lanes | Richmond Heights, Missouri | Feb 8–13 | Bob Learn, Jr. (2) |
| Cleveland Open | Yorktown Lanes | Parma Heights, Ohio | Feb 16–20 | Ron Williams (4) |
| Bud Light PBA National Championship | Imperial Lanes | Toledo, Ohio | Feb 21–27 | Ron Palombi, Jr. (6) |
| Flagship City Open | Eastway Lanes | Erie, Pennsylvania | Mar 1–6 | Walter Ray Williams, Jr. (7) |
| Baltimore Open | Fair Lanes Woodlawn | Baltimore, Maryland | Mar 9–13 | George Branham III (3) |
| Johnny Petraglia Open | Carolier Lanes | North Brunswick, New Jersey | Mar 15–20 | Ricky Ward (1) |
| Leisure's Long Island Open | Sayville Bowl | Sayville, New York | Mar 22–27 | Dave Arnold (1) |
| Tums Classic | Bradley Bowl | Windsor Locks, Connecticut | Mar 30 – Apr 3 | Jason Couch (1) |
| BPAA U.S. Open | Roseland Bowl | Canandaigua, New York | Apr 4–10 | Del Ballard, Jr. (12) |
| IOF Foresters Bowling for Miracles Open | Club 300 Bowl | Markham, Ontario | Apr 13–17 | Pete Weber (20) |
| Firestone Tournament of Champions | Riviera Lanes | Fairlawn, Ohio | Apr 20–24 | George Branham III (4) |
| PBA Touring Pro/Senior Doubles | St. Clair Bowl | O'Fallon, Illinois | May 11–15 | Teata Semiz, Rich Abboud (1) |
| Columbia 300 Open | Astro Bowling Center | San Antonio, Texas | May 17–22 | Walter Ray Williams, Jr. (8) |
| Billy Vuckovich III Memorial Fresno Open | Cedar Lanes | Fresno, California | May 24–29 | Randy Pedersen (9) |
| Seattle Open | Skyway Park Bowl | Seattle, Washington | Jun 7–12 | Steve Fields (1) |
| Northwest Classic | Celebrity Bowl | Kennewick, Washington | Jun 14–19 | Walter Ray Williams, Jr. (9) |
| Oregon Open | Hollywood Bowl | Portland, Oregon | Jun 22–26 | Walter Ray Williams, Jr. (10) |
| Active West Open | Active West Town Square Lanes | Riverside, California | Jun 28 – Jul 2 | Brian Voss (13) |
| Tucson PBA Open | Golden Pin Lanes | Tucson, Arizona | Jul 6–10 | Walter Ray Williams, Jr. (11) |
| El Paso Open | Bowl El Paso | El Paso, Texas | Jul 13–17 | Bob Benoit (4) |
| Wichita Open | Northrock Lanes | Wichita, Kansas | Jul 27–31 | Mike Aulby (22) |
| Choice Hotels Summer Classic | Boulevard Bowl | Edmond, Oklahoma | Aug 2–7 | Steve Jaros (2) |
| Greater Grand Rapids Open | Spectrum Lanes | Grand Rapids, Michigan | Aug 8–12 | Walter Ray Williams, Jr. (12) |
| Greater Harrisburg Open | ABC West Lanes | Mechanicsburg, Pennsylvania | Aug 14–19 | Brian Davis (1) |
| Paula Carter's Homestead Classic | Paula Carter's Pro Bowl | Homestead, Florida | Aug 21–26 | Walter Ray Williams, Jr. (13) |
| Oronamin C Japan Cup | Tokyo Port Bowl | Tokyo, Japan | Oct 7–10 | Pete Weber (21) |
| Rochester Open | Marcel's Olympic Bowl | Rochester, New York | Oct 16–20 | Roger Bowker (4) |
| Greater Detroit Open | Taylor Lanes | Taylor, Michigan | Oct 23–27 | Norm Duke (4) |
| Touring Players Championship | Woodland Bowl | Indianapolis, Indiana | Oct 30 – Nov 3 | Jason Couch (2) |
| Brunswick Memorial World Open | Brunswick Deer Park Lanes | Lake Zurich, Illinois | Nov 4–10 | Dave Husted (8) |
| Merit Mixed Doubles Championship | Hilton Lanes | Reno, Nevada | Dec 2–5 | Parker Bohn III (10), Aleta Sill |
