= 1996 PBA Tour season =

PBA Bowling Tour: 1996 Season
- League: Professional Bowlers Association
- Sport: Ten-pin bowling
- Duration: January 22 – December 15, 1996

PBA Tour
- Season MVP: Walter Ray Williams, Jr.

PBA Tour seasons
- ← 1995 1997 →

This is a recap of the 1996 season for the Professional Bowlers Association (PBA) Tour. It was the tour's 38th season, and consisted of 29 events.

Dave D'Entremont won his first career major at the Brunswick World Tournament of Champions. Likewise, long-time PBA Tour professional Butch Soper captured his first career major at the PBA National Championship.

Dave Husted became the first PBA player to win three modern-day BPAA U.S. Open titles, and the first to win back-to-back as he successfully defended his 1995 U.S. Open crown.

Though shut out in the major tournaments, Walter Ray Williams, Jr. collected five titles on the season and led the tour in earnings, helping him win PBA Player of the Year honors for the third time in his career.

At the Columbia 300 Open, C.K. Moore rolled the PBA's ninth televised 300 game, becoming the first Tour rookie to do so. Later in the season, at the Flagship Open, Bob Learn, Jr. rolled the PBA's 10th televised perfect game in his hometown of Erie, Pennsylvania. At this same event, Learn shattered the PBA record for a four-game TV series by downing 1,129 pins. The old record was set in 1995 by David Ozio, who toppled 1,070 pins.

== Tournament schedule ==
Event	Bowling center	City	Dates	Winner
Peoria Open	Landmark Recreation Center	Peoria, Illinois	Jan 22–26	Wayne Webb (18)
Columbia 300 Open	Highland Lanes	Austin, Texas	Jan 29 – Feb 2	C.K. Moore (1)
Reno Open	Reno Hilton Bowling Center	Reno, Nevada	Feb 5–9	Dave Arnold (2)
Oregon Open	Hollywood Bowl	Portland, Oregon	Feb 12–16	Brian Voss (16)
Track Synergy Open	Celebrity Bowl/Tri-Cities Coliseum	Kennewick, Washington	Feb 18–23	Walter Ray Williams, Jr. (17)
Tucson Open	Golden Pin Lanes	Tucson, Arizona	Feb 25 – Mar 1	Bryan Goebel (8)
AC-Delco Classic	Cal Bowl	Lakewood, California	Mar 5–9	Tom Baker (8)
Showboat Invitational	Showboat Bowling Center	Las Vegas, Nevada	Mar 10–16	Walter Ray Williams, Jr. (18)
Quaker State 250	Warrior Coliseum	Grand Prairie, Texas	Mar 17–23	Steve Wilson (1)
Comfort Inn Classic	Don Carter's All-Star Lanes-Sawgrass	Sunrise, Florida	Mar 26–30	Steve Hoskins (4)
Flagship Open	Eastway Lanes/Erie Civic Center	Erie, Pennsylvania	Apr 2–6	Bob Learn, Jr. (3)
Brunswick Johnny Petraglia Open	Carolier Lanes	North Brunswick, New Jersey	Apr 9–13	Walter Ray Williams, Jr. (19)
Bud Light Championship	Sayville Bowl	Sayville, New York	Apr 16–20	Philip Ringener (1)
Brunswick World Tournament of Champions	Brunswick Deer Park Lanes	Lake Zurich, Illinois	Apr 21–27	Dave D'Entremont (5)
IOF Foresters Open	Classic Bowl	Mississauga, Ontario	May 14–18	David Traber (3)
Greater Baltimore Open	Country Club Lanes	Baltimore, Maryland	May 21–25	Mike Aulby (24)
Greater Hartford Open	Bradley Bowl	Windsor Locks, Connecticut	May 28 – Jun 1	Dennis Horan (2)
PBA National Championship	Ducat's Imperial Lanes	Toledo, Ohio	Jun 2–8	Butch Soper (6)
Greater Detroit Open	Taylor Lanes	Taylor, Michigan	Jun 11–15	Doug Kent (1)
Kingpin Classic	Northrock Lanes	Wichita, Kansas	Jun 18–22	Jess Stayrook (6)
Oronamin C Japan Cup	Tokyo Port Bowl	Tokyo, Japan	Sep 19–22	Steve Wilson (2)
BPAA U.S. Open	Woodland Bowl	Indianapolis, Indiana	Sep 28 – Oct 4	Dave Husted (13)
Cleveland Open	Brunswick Ambassador Lanes	Bedford, Ohio	Oct 5–6	George Branham III (5)
Ebonite Classic	Bowl One Lanes	Troy, Michigan	Oct 11 – Nov 15	Marshall Holman (22)
Rochester Open	Marcel's Olympic Bowl	Rochester, New York	Oct 19–23	Walter Ray Williams, Jr. (20)
Touring Pro/Senior Doubles	East Providence Lanes	East Providence, Rhode Island	Oct 26–30	Eric Forkel (4), Gene Stus
Greater Harrisburg Open	ABC West Lanes	Mechanicsburg, Pennsylvania	Nov 2–6	Walter Ray Williams, Jr. (21)
Bayer/Brunswick Touring Players Championship	Olympic Lanes-Harmar	Harmarville, Pennsylvania	Nov 8–12	Mike Aulby (25)
Merit Mixed Doubles Championship	Sam's Town Bowling Center	Las Vegas, Nevada	Dec 13–15	Mark Williams (7), Aleta Sill
