= 1990 PBA Tour season =

PBA Bowling Tour: 1990 Season
- League: Professional Bowlers Association
- Sport: Ten-pin bowling
- Duration: January 9 – December 10, 1990

PBA Tour
- Season MVP: Amleto Monacelli

PBA Tour seasons
- ← 1989 1991 →

This is a recap of the 1990 season for the Professional Bowlers Association (PBA) Tour. It was the tour's 32nd season, and consisted of 37 events. Amleto Monacelli repeated as PBA Player of the Year, winning another three titles on top of the four he had won in 1989.

Jim Pencak won his second title and first major at the Society Bank PBA National Championship. By also winning the Budweiser Open and Showboat Atlantic City Open later in the season, Pencak set a PBA record by winning the first 15 TV matches of his career.

Ron Palombi, Jr. won a major at the Seagram's Coolers U.S. Open, while Dave Ferraro was victorious at the Firestone Tournament of Champions.

== Tournament schedule ==
Event	Bowling center	City	Dates	Winner
AC-Delco Classic	Gable House Bowl	Torrance, California	Jan 9–13	Ron Williams (2)
Showboat Invitational	Showboat Bowling Center	Las Vegas, Nevada	Jan 14–20	Dave Husted (7)
ARC Pinole Open	Pinole Valley Lanes	Pinole, California	Jan 23–27	Chris Warren (1)
Quaker State Open	Forum Bowling Lanes	Grand Prairie, Texas	Jan 30 – Feb 3	Randy Pedersen (8)
Don Carter Classic	Don Carter's All-Star Lanes	Kenner, Louisiana	Feb 5–10	Parker Bohn III (3)
Budweiser Classic	Don Carter's All-Star Lanes	Sunrise, Florida	Feb 12–17	Brian Voss (9)
Bowler's Journal Florida Space Coast Open	Shore Lanes	Merritt Island, Florida	Feb 19–24	Robert Lawrence (1)
Fair Lanes Open	Fair Lanes Woodlawn	Baltimore, Maryland	Feb 26 – Mar 3	Danny Wiseman (1)
Columbus Professional Bowling Classic	Columbus Square Bowling Center	Columbus, Ohio	Mar 5–10	Amleto Monacelli (7)
Society Bank PBA National Championship	Ducat's Imperial Lanes	Toledo, Ohio	Mar 11–17	Jim Pencak (2)
Budweiser Open	Buckeye Lanes	North Olmsted, Ohio	Mar 19–24	Jim Pencak (3)
True Value Open	Landmark Recreation Center	Peoria, Illinois	Mar 27–31	Robert Lawrence (2)
Seagram's Coolers U.S. Open	Woodland Bowl	Indianapolis, Indiana	Apr 1–7	Ron Palombi, Jr. (4)
Showboat Atlantic City Open	Showboat Lanes	Atlantic City, New Jersey	Apr 9–14	Jim Pencak (4)
Greater Hartford Open	Bradley Bowl	Windsor Locks, Connecticut	Apr 17–21	Mike Aulby (19)
Firestone Tournament of Champions	Riviera Lanes	Fairlawn, Ohio	Apr 24–28	Dave Ferraro (6)
Seattle Open	Skyway Park Bowl	Seattle, Washington	May 15–19	Chris Warren (2)
PBA Oregon Open	Hollywood Bowl	Portland, Oregon	May 22–26	Mark Baker (4)
Showboat PBA Doubles Classic	Showboat Bowling Center	Las Vegas, Nevada	May 29 – Jun 2	David Ozio (6), Steve Wunderlich (2)
Kessler Open	Earl Anthony's Dublin Bowl	Dublin, California	Jun 11–16	Butch Soper (4)
Fresno Open	Cedar Lanes	Fresno, California	Jun 19–23	Hugh Miller (5)
Kessler Classic	Town Square Lanes	Riverside, California	Jun 26–30	Danny Wiseman (2)
Fair Lanes Phoenix Classic	Fair Lanes Squaw Peak	Phoenix, Arizona	Jul 2–7	Ron Polombi, Jr. (5)
Miller Lite Challenge	Golden Pin Lanes	Tucson, Arizona	Jul 9–14	Bryan Goebel (1)
El Paso Open	Bowl El Paso	El Paso, Texas	Jul 17–21	Scott Devers (4)
Quality Inns International Summer Classic	Boulevard Bowl	Edmond, Oklahoma	Jul 22–28	Parker Bohn III (4)
Columbia 300 Open	Highland Lanes	Austin, Texas	Jul 29 – Aug 2	Bob Handley (5)
Wichita Open	Northrock Lanes	Wichita, Kansas	Aug 4–9	Amleto Monacelli (8)
La Mode Classic	Red Carpet Lanes	Green Bay, Wisconsin	Aug 11–16	Pete Weber (14)
Senior/Touring Pro Doubles Championship	Thruway Lanes	Buffalo, New York	Aug 19–23	Dave Soutar (18), Rowdy Morrow (2)
Oronamin C Japan Cup '90	Tokyo Port Bowl	Tokyo, Japan	Oct 11–14	Chris Warren (3)
Chevy Truck Classic	Marcel's Olympic Bowl	Rochester, New York	Oct 29 – Nov 3	Roger Bowker (2)
Toyota Classic	Tropicana Lanes	Richmond Heights, Missouri	Nov 5–10	Pete Weber (15)
Brunswick Memorial World Open	Brunswick Northern Bowl	Glendale Heights, Illinois	Nov 10–17	Jimmy Johnson (1)
American Bowling Congress Fall Classic	Red Carpet Celebrity Lanes	Milwaukee, Wisconsin	Nov 19–24	Parker Bohn III (5)
Budwesier Touring Players Championship	Taylor Lanes	Taylor, Michigan	Nov 26 – Dec 1	Duane Fisher (1)
Cambridge Mixed Doubles	Sally's Lanes	Reno, Nevada	Dec 7–10	Amleto Monacelli (9), Tish Johnson
