= 1995 PBA Tour season =

PBA Bowling Tour: 1995 Season
- League: Professional Bowlers Association
- Sport: Ten-pin bowling
- Duration: January 10 – December 10, 1995

PBA Tour
- Season MVP: Mike Aulby

PBA Tour seasons
- ← 1994 1996 →

This is a recap of the 1995 season for the Professional Bowlers Association (PBA) Tour. It was the tour's 37th season, and consisted of 30 events.

The "semi-retired" Dave Husted won his 12th title and second BPAA U.S. Open crown in front of the largest crowd to ever witness a PBA event. After the qualifying at Bowl One Lanes in Troy, Michigan, the TV finals moved to Detroit's Joe Louis Arena, where a paid audience of 7,212 were in attendance. Bowling in his first TV finals, Scott Alexander was the surprise winner at the Chevrolet PBA National Championship.

Mike Aulby captured the Brunswick World Tournament of Champions to complete his quest for the "triple crown" of PBA majors. He joined Billy Hardwick, Johnny Petraglia and Pete Weber as the PBA's only triple crown winners to date. As the Tour's leading money winner for 1995, Aulby was also voted the PBA Player of the Year.

At the Northwest Classic in July, John Handegard became the oldest PBA Tour champion. Handegard was 57 years, 55 days old. Hall of Famer Buzz Fazio was 56 years, 307 days old when he won a standard PBA tour event in December, 1964.

Another record was set late in the year at the AMF Dick Weber Classic, where David Ozio rolled a four-game total of 1,070 pins en route to the title. This broke the 11-year-old record of 1,050 pins set by Nelson Burton Jr.

== Tournament schedule ==
Event	Bowling center	City	Dates	Winner
AC-Delco Classic	Cal Bowl	Lakewood, California	Jan 10–14	Jess Stayrook (4)
Hilton Hotels Classic	Reno Hilton Bowling Center	Reno, Nevada	Jan 17–21	Justin Hromek (3)
Showboat Invitational	Showboat Bowling Center	Las Vegas, Nevada	Jan 22–28	Dave Husted (11)
Quaker State 250	Forum Bowling Lanes	Grand Prairie, Texas	Jan 31 – Feb 4	Bob Spaulding (1)
Choice Hotels Classic	Don Carter's All-Star Lanes-Sawgrass	Sunrise, Florida	Feb 7–11	Dave D'Entremont (3)
Peoria Open	Landmark Recreation Center	Peoria, Illinois	Feb 14–18	Dave D'Entremont (4)
Chevrolet PBA National Championship	Ducat's Imperial Lanes	Toledo, Ohio	Feb 19–25	Scott Alexander (1)
Greater Baltimore Open	Country Club Lanes	Baltimore, Maryland	Feb 28 – Mar 4	David Traber (2)
Brunswick Johnny Petraglia Open	Carolier Lanes	North Brunswick, New Jersey	Mar 7–11	John Gant (3)
Bud Light Championship	Sayville Bowl	Sayville, New York	Mar 14–18	Jess Stayrook (5)
Tums Classic	Bradley Bowl	Windsor Locks, Connecticut	Mar 21–25	Jack Jurek (1)
Splitfire Spark Plug Open	Eastway Lanes/Erie Civic Center	Erie, Pennsylvania	Mar 28 – Apr 1	Danny Wiseman (5)
BPAA U.S. Open	Bowl One/Joe Louis Arena	Detroit, Michigan	Apr 2–8	Dave Husted (12)
IOF Foresters Open	Club 300 Bowl	Markham, Ontario	Apr 11–15	Mark Roth (34)
Brunswick World Tournament of Champions	Brunswick Deer Park Lanes	Lake Zurich, Illinois	Apr 18–22	Mike Aulby (23)
Northwest Classic	Celebrity Bowl	Kennewick, Washington	Jul 7–11	John Handegard (1)
PBA Oregon Open	Hollywood Bowl	Portland, Oregon	Jul 14–18	Norm Duke (10)
Tucson PBA Open	Golden Pin Lanes	Tucson, Arizona	Jul 21–25	Bryan Goebel (7)
Columbia 300 Open	Highland Lanes	Austin, Texas	Jul 28 – Aug 1	Parker Bohn III (11)
Ebonite Kentucky Classic	Executive Bowl	Louisville, Kentucky	Aug 4–8	Randy Pedersen (11)
Cleveland Open	Brunswick Ambassador Lanes	Bedford, Ohio	Aug 11–15	Norm Duke (11)
Bowlers Journal Classic	ABC West Lanes	Mechanicsburg, Pennsylvania	Aug 18–22	Jason Couch (3)
Oronamin C Japan Cup	Tokyo Port Bowl	Tokyo, Japan	Sep 21–24	Amleto Monacelli (16)
Indianapolis Open	Woodland Bowl	Indianapolis, Indiana	Sep 30 – Oct 4	Jason Couch (4)
Greater Detroit Open	Taylor Lanes	Taylor, Michigan	Oct 7–11	Brian Voss (15)
Great Lakes Open	Spectrum Lanes/Welsh Auditorium	Grand Rapids, Michigan	Oct 14–18	Danny Wiseman (6)
Rochester Open	Marcel's Olympic Bowl	Rochester, New York	Oct 21–25	Walter Ray Williams Jr. (16)
AMF Dick Weber Classic	AMF Major League Lanes	Richmond, Virginia	Oct 28 – Nov 1	David Ozio (11)
Bayer/Brunswick Touring Players Championship	Olympic Lanes-Harmar	Harmarville, Pennsylvania	Nov 3–8	Ernie Schlegel (6)
Merit Mixed Doubles Championship	Sam's Town Bowling Center	Las Vegas, Nevada	Dec 8–10	Butch Soper (5), Kim Canady
