= 1991 PBA Tour season =

PBA Bowling Tour: 1991 Season
- League: Professional Bowlers Association
- Sport: Ten-pin bowling
- Duration: January 8 – December 8, 1991

PBA Tour
- Season MVP: David Ozio

PBA Tour seasons
- ← 1990 1992 →

This is a recap of the 1991 season for the Professional Bowlers Association (PBA) Tour. It was the tour's 33rd season, and consisted of 36 events.

The 1991 season featured the infamous "Del Ballard, Jr. gutter ball." Needing two strikes and seven pins in the tenth frame to defeat Pete Weber for the title at the Fair Lanes Open, Ballard got the necessary first two strikes. But he then inexplicably tossed his fill ball into the channel, handing Weber the title.

Ballard would rebound to win four titles in 1991, but it was another four-time winner, David Ozio, who claimed PBA Player of the Year honors. Among his four titles on the season, Ozio was victorious at the Firestone Tournament of Champions. The televised finals for this event were delayed 40 minutes due to a bomb threat, which turned out to be a prank call.

Mike Miller won his first-ever PBA title at the PBA National Championship, while Pete Weber captured the second BPAA U.S. Open title of his career, and fourth major title overall. Post-interview after winning the tournament, Pete held up the trophy above his head, and the cast resin eagle attachment unexpectedly fell from the base and shattered into pieces upon hitting the floor. Telecast commentator and longtime professional Nelson Burton, Jr. later suspected guilt for the mishap, recalling that before they went on the air, he unscrewed the nut that held the eagle in place and showed it to the audience before putting it back on the base, neglecting to secure the nut back on. He cannot remember fully if this is the case, but believes it is. Weber was mailed a replacement trophy a few days later.

John Mazza made PBA TV history in a semi-final match at the Bud Light Classic, when he became just the second person ever to convert the 7–10 split on national television. (Mark Roth was the first.) Jess Stayrook would become the third player to accomplish the same feat, later in the season at the Tucson Open.

== Tournament schedule ==
Event	Bowling center	City	Dates	Winner
AC-Delco Classic	Gable House Bowl	Torrance, California	Jan 8–12	David Ozio (7)
Showboat Invitational	Showboat Bowling Center	Las Vegas, Nevada	Jan 13–19	David Ozio (8)
ARC Pinole Open	Pinole Valley Lanes	Pinole, California	Jan 22–26	Brian Voss (10)
Quaker State Open	Forum Bowling Lanes	Grand Prairie, Texas	Jan 29 – Feb 2	Amleto Monacelli (10)
Florida Open	Cypress Lanes	Winter Haven, Florida	Feb 5–9	John Mazza (1)
Bud Light Classic	Don Carter's All-Star Lanes-Sawgrass	Sunrise, Florida	Feb 11–16	Bob Benoit (2)
Flagship City Open	Eastway Lanes	Erie, Pennsylvania	Feb 19–23	Jess Stayrook (2)
Fair Lanes Open	Fair Lanes Kings Point	Randallstown, Maryland	Feb 25 – Mar 2	Pete Weber (16)
Johnny Petraglia Open	Carolier Lanes	North Brunswick, New Jersey	Mar 4–9	Pete Weber (17)
Leisure's Long Island Open	Sayville Lanes	Sayville, New York	Mar 11–16	Del Ballard, Jr. (6)
Bud Light Open	Yorktown Lanes	Parma Heights, Ohio	Mar 18–23	Norm Duke (2)
PBA National Championship	Ducat's Imperial Lanes	Toledo, Ohio	Mar 24–30	Mike Miller (1)
True Value Open	Landmark Recreation Center	Peoria, Illinois	Apr 1–6	Amleto Monacelli (11)
BPAA U.S. Open	Woodland Bowl	Indianapolis, Indiana	Apr 7–13	Pete Weber (18)
Tums Classic	Bradley Bowl	Windsor Locks, Connecticut	Apr 16–20	Billy Young, Jr. (2)
Firestone Tournament of Champions	Riviera Lanes	Fairlawn, Ohio	Apr 23–27	David Ozio (9)
Fresno Open	Cedar Lanes	Fresno, California	May 7–11	John Mazza (2)
Kessler Classic	Town Square Lanes	Riverside, California	May 14–18	Bryan Goebel (2)
Celebrity Denver Open	Celebrity Sports Center	Denver, Colorado	May 21–25	John Mazza (3)
Beaumont PBA Doubles Classic	Crossroads Bowling Center	Beaumont, Texas	May 28 – Jun 1	Del Ballard, Jr. (7), Bob Benoit (3)
Kessler Open	Earl Anthony's Dublin Bowl	Dublin, California	Jun 11–15	Del Ballard, Jr. (8)
Seattle Open	Skyway Park Bowl	Seattle, Washington	Jun 18–22	Danny Wiseman (3)
PBA Oregon Open	Hollywood Bowl	Portland, Oregon	Jun 25–29	Tony Westlake (3)
El Paso Open	Bowl El Paso	El Paso, Texas	Jul 2–6	Ray Edwards (1)
Tucson Open	Golden Pin Lanes	Tucson, Arizona	Jul 9–13	Norm Duke (3)
Wichita Open	Northrock Lanes	Wichita, Kansas	Jul 16–20	Chris Warren (4)
Columbia 300 Open	Highland Lanes	Austin, Texas	Jul 22–27	Brian Voss (11)
Choice Hotels International Summer Classic	Boulevard Bowl	Edmond, Oklahoma	Jul 28 – Aug 3	Steve Jaros (1)
La Mode Classic	Red Carpet Lanes	Green Bay, Wisconsin	Aug 4–8	Tony Westlake (4)
Senior/Touring Pro Doubles	Thruway Lanes	Buffalo, New York	Aug 11–15	Teata Semiz, Rick Steelsmith (1)
Toyota Classic	Tropicana Lanes	Richmond Heights, Missouri	Sep 30 – Oct 5	Danny Wiseman (4)
Oronamin C Japan Cup	Tokyo Port Bowl	Tokyo, Japan	Oct 10–13	Walter Ray Williams, Jr. (6)
Brunswick Memorial World Open	Brunswick Deer Park Lanes	Lake Zurich, Illinois	Nov 10–16	Jess Stayrook (3)
Chevy Truck Classic	Marcel's Olympic Bowl	Rochester, New York	Nov 18–23	David Ozio (10)
Bud Light Touring Players Championship	Taylor Lanes	Taylor, Michigan	Nov 25–30	Dave Ferraro (7)
Cambridge Mixed Doubles	Bally's Bowling Center	Reno, Nevada	Dec 6–8	Del Ballard, Jr. (9), Nikki Gianulias
