= 1989 PBA Tour season =

PBA Bowling Tour: 1989 Season
- League: Professional Bowlers Association
- Sport: Ten-pin bowling
- Duration: January 3 – December 7, 1989

PBA Tour
- Season MVP: Amleto Monacelli

PBA Tour seasons
- ← 1988 1990 →

This is a recap of the 1989 season for the Professional Bowlers Association (PBA) Tour. It was the tour's 31st season, and consisted of 36 events.

Despite winning four titles (including a major at the Seagram's Coolers U.S. Open) and setting a PBA record of $298,237 in season earnings, Mike Aulby was out-voted for PBA Player of the Year honors in favor of Amleto Monacelli. Monacelli also won four titles, including the Budweiser Touring Players Championship, while leading the Tour in points and finishing second in earnings.

Pete Weber completed the triple crown of PBA majors when he took the title in the Trustcorp PBA National Championship. He joined Johnny Petraglia and Billy Hardwick as the PBA's only career triple crown winners.

Del Ballard, Jr. captured his second career major title and fifth overall at the Firestone Tournament of Champions.

== Tournament schedule ==
Event	Bowling center	City	Dates	Winner
ARC Pinole Open	Pinole Valley Lanes	Pinole, California	Jan 3–7	Ernie Schlegel (5)
AC-Delco Classic	Gable House Bowl	Torrance, California	Jan 9–14	Randy Pedersen (5)
Showboat Invitational	Showboat Bowling Center	Las Vegas, Nevada	Jan 15–21	Del Ballard, Jr. (3)
Quaker State Open	Forum Bowling Lanes	Grand Prairie, Texas	Jan 23–28	Del Ballard, Jr. (4)
Budweiser Classic	Don Carter's Kendall Lanes	Miami, Florida	Jan 30 – Feb 4	Randy Pedersen (6)
Bowler's Journal Florida Open	Shore Lanes	Merritt Island, Florida	Feb 6–11	Brian Voss (7)
Don Carter's Greater New Orleans Classic	Don Carter's All-Star Lanes	Harvey, Louisiana	Feb 13–18	Brian Voss (8)
True Value Open	Landmark Plaza Recreation Center	Peoria, Illinois	Feb 20–25	Wayne Webb (17)
Showboat Atlantic City Open	Atlantic City Showboat Lanes	Atlantic City, New Jersey	Feb 27 – Mar 4	Mike Aulby (15)
Budweiser Open	Buckeye Lanes	North Olmsted, Ohio	Mar 6–11	Mike Aulby (16)
Trustcorp PBA National Championship	Imperial Lanes	Toledo, Ohio	Mar 13–18	Pete Weber (12)
King Louie Open	King Louie West Lanes	Overland Park, Kansas	Mar 20–25	Butch Soper (3)
Seagram's Coolers U.S. Open	Boulevard Bowl	Edmond, Oklahoma	Mar 27 – Apr 1	Mike Aulby (17)
Fair Lanes Open	Fair Lanes Woodlawn	Baltimore, Maryland	Apr 3–8	Ron Bell (1)
Greater Hartford Open	Bradley Bowl	Windsor Locks, Connecticut	Apr 10–15	Charlie Tapp (2)
Firestone Tournament of Champions	Riviera Lanes	Akron, Ohio	Apr 18–22	Del Ballard, Jr. (5)
A & W Fair Lanes Open	Fair Lanes Squaw Peak	Phoenix, Arizona	May 16–20	Harry Sullins (3)
Fresno Open	Cedar Lanes	Fresno, California	May 23–27	Marc McDowell (1)
Showboat PBA Doubles Classic	Showboat Bowling Center	Las Vegas, Nevada	May 30 – Jun 3	Mike Aulby (18), Steve Cook (14)
Kessler Open	Earl Anthony's Dublin Bowl	Dublin, California	Jun 17–21	Pete Weber (13)
Seattle Open	Skyway Park Bowl	Seattle, Washington	Jun 24–28	Jess Stayrook (1)
Kessler Classic	Town Square Lanes	Riverside, California	Jul 1–5	Tom Crites (5)
Miller Lite Challenge	Golden Pin Lanes	Tucson, Arizona	Jul 8–12	Amleto Monacelli (3)
El Paso Open	Bowl El Paso	El Paso, Texas	Jul 15–19	Tony Westlake (2)
Columbia 300 Open	Highland Lanes	Austin, Texas	Jul 22–26	Joe Salvemini (3)
Wichita Open	Northrock Lanes	Wichita, Kansas	Jul 29 – Aug 2	Amleto Monacelli (4)
La Mode Classic	Red Carpet Lanes	Green Bay, Wisconsin	Aug 5–9	Jim Pencak (1)
Senior/Touring Pro Doubles Championship	Thruway Lanes	Cheektowaga, New York	Aug 12–16	Dick Weber (27), Marc McDowell (2)
Number 7 PBA Invitational	Silver Dollar Action Centre	Calgary, Alberta	Sep 22–24	Kevin West (amateur) (1)
Oronamin C Japan Cup '89	Tokyo Port Bowl	Tokyo, Japan	Oct 11–14	Randy Pedersen (7)
Budweiser Challenge	Marcel's Olympic Bowl	Rochester, New York	Oct 24–28	Joe Berardi (10)
Toyota Classic	Tropicana Lanes	St. Louis, Missouri	Nov 7–11	Charlie Tapp (3)
Brunswick Memorial World Open	Brunswick Northern Bowl	Glendale Heights, Illinois	Nov 11–18	Parker Bohn III (2)
Milwaukee Classic	Red Carpet Celebrity Lanes	Milwaukee, Wisconsin	Nov 20–25	David Ozio (5)
Budwesier Touring Players Championship	Taylor Lanes	Taylor, Michigan	Nov 27 – Dec 2	Amleto Monacelli (5)
Cambridge Mixed Doubles	Sally's Lanes	Reno, Nevada	Dec 4–7	Amleto Monacelli (6), Tish Johnson
