= Bowling Writers Association of America Bowler of the Year =

Bowler of the Year

The Bowling Writers Association of America (BWAA) annually selects a Male Bowler of the Year and a Female Bowler of the Year.

== Dick Weber Male Bowler of the Year ==
- 1942: Johnny Cremins
- 1943: Ned Day
- 1944: Ned Day
- 1945: Buddy Bomar
- 1946: Joe Wilman
- 1947: Buddy Bomar
- 1948: Andy Varipapa
- 1949: Connie Schwoegler
- 1950: Junie McMahon
- 1951: Lee Jouglard
- 1952: Steve Nagy
- 1953: Don Carter
- 1954: Don Carter
- 1955: Steve Nagy
- 1956: Bill Lillard
- 1957: Don Carter
- 1958: Don Carter
- 1959: Ed Lubanski
- 1960: Don Carter
- 1961: Dick Weber
- 1962: Don Carter
- 1963: Dick Weber
- 1964: Billy Hardwick
- 1965: Dick Weber
- 1966: Wayne Zahn
- 1967: Dave Davis
- 1968: Jim Stefanich
- 1969: Billy Hardwick
- 1970: Nelson Burton Jr.
- 1971: Don Johnson
- 1972: Don Johnson
- 1973: Don McCune
- 1974: Earl Anthony
- 1975: Earl Anthony
- 1976: Earl Anthony
- 1977: Mark Roth
- 1978: Mark Roth
- 1979: Mark Roth
- 1980: Wayne Webb
- 1981: Earl Anthony
- 1982: Earl Anthony
- 1983: Earl Anthony
- 1984: Mark Roth
- 1985: Mike Aulby
- 1986: Walter Ray Williams
- 1987: Marshall Holman
- 1988: Brian Voss
- 1989: Mike Aulby
- 1990: Amleto Monacelli
- 1991: David Ozio
- 1992: Marc McDowell
- 1993: Walter Ray Williams
- 1994: Norm Duke
- 1995: Mike Aulby
- 1996: Walter Ray Williams
- 1997: Walter Ray Williams
- 1998: Walter Ray Williams
- 1999: Parker Bohn III
- 2000: Norm Duke
- 2001: Parker Bohn III
- 2002: Walter Ray Williams
- 2003: Walter Ray Williams
- 2004: Walter Ray Williams
- 2005: Patrick Allen
- 2006: Tommy Jones
- 2007: Patrick Allen
- 2008: Norm Duke
- 2009: Norm Duke
- 2010: Bill O'Neill
- 2011: Mika Koivuniemi
- 2012: Mike Fagan

== Female Bowler of the Year ==
- 1948: Val Mikiel
- 1949: Val Mikiel
- 1950: Marion Ladewig
- 1951: Marion Ladewig
- 1952: Marion Ladewig
- 1953: Marion Ladewig
- 1954: Marion Ladewig
- 1955: Sylvia Martin
- 1956: Anita Cantaline
- 1957: Marion Ladewig
- 1958: Marion Ladewig
- 1959: Marion Ladewig
- 1960: Sylvia Martin
- 1961: Shirley Garms
- 1962: Shirley Garms
- 1963: Marion Ladewig
- 1964: LaVerne Carter
- 1965: Betty Kuczynski
- 1966: Joy Abel
- 1967: Mildred Ignizio
- 1968: Dotty Fothergill
- 1969: Dotty Fothergill
- 1970: Mary Baker Harris
- 1971: Paula Carter
- 1972: Patty Costello
- 1973: Judy Soutar
- 1974: Betty Morris
- 1975: Judy Soutar
- 1976: Patty Costello
- 1977: Betty Morris
- 1978: Donna Adamek
- 1979: Donna Adamek
- 1980: Donna Adamek
- 1981: Donna Adamek
- 1982: Nikki Gianulias
- 1983: Lisa Wagner
- 1984: Aleta Sill
- 1985: Aleta Sill
- 1986: Lisa Wagner
- 1987: Betty Morris
- 1988: Lisa Wagner
- 1989: Robin Romeo
- 1990: Tish Johnson
- 1991: Leanne Barrette
- 1992: Tish Johnson
- 1993: Lisa Wagner
- 1994: Anne Marie Duggan
- 1995: Tish Johnson
- 1996: Wendy Macpherson
- 1997: Wendy Macpherson
- 1998: Carol Gianotti-Block
- 1999: Wendy Macpherson
- 2000: Wendy Macpherson
- 2001: Carolyn Dorin-Ballard
- 2002: Leanne Barrette
- 2003: Carolyn Dorin-Ballard
- 2004: Shannon Pluhowsky
- 2005: Liz Johnson
- 2006: Kelly Kulick
- 2007: Liz Johnson
- 2008: Lynda Barnes
- 2009: Liz Johnson
- 2010: Kelly Kulick
- 2011: Shannon Pluhowsky
- 2012: Diandra Asbaty
