= Anita Cantaline =

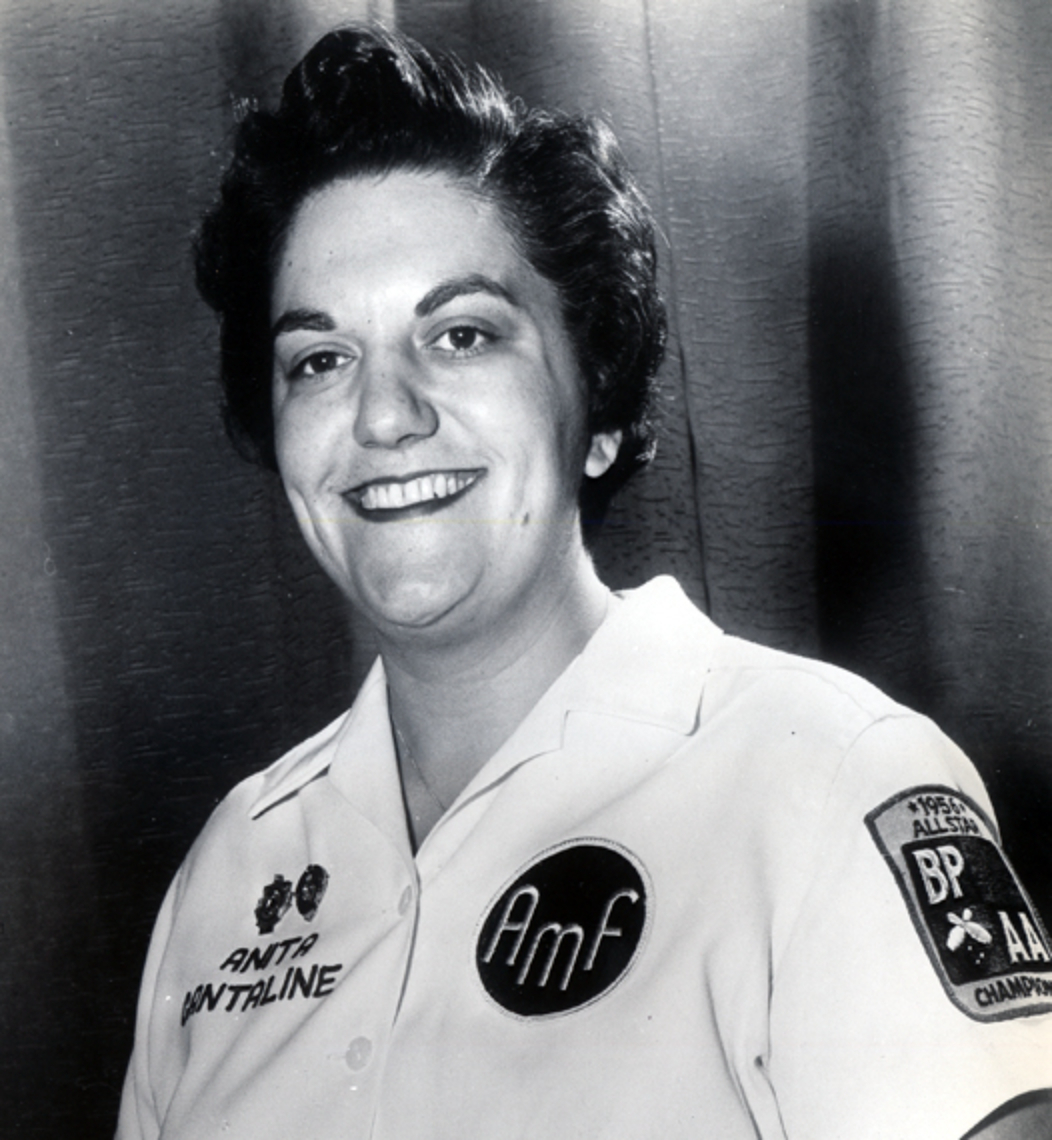

Personal information
- Born: c. 1927

Sport
- Country: United States
- Sport: Ten-pin bowling

Anita Cantaline (born c. 1927) is an American former professional bowler from Detroit and later Warren, Michigan. A graduate of Cass Tech High School, she won her first women's championship in 1948. In December 1955, she won the U.S. Women's Open. She was inducted into the Women's International Bowling Congress (WIBC) Hall of Fame in 1979. She also won the Bowling Proprietors Association of America (BPAA) All-Star tournament in 1956, the WIBC all-events title in 1957, and WIBC team championships in 1957 and 1959. She was also named the BPAA National Individual Match Game champion in 1956. She was the first woman to win both the singles and doubles championships in the same year and was named 1956 Bowling Writers Association of America Bowler of the Year. As of 2008, she had made 62 tournament appearances.
