= Steve Nagy =

Steve Nagy may refer to:

- Steve Nagy (baseball)
- Steve Nagy (bowler)
