= Dave D'Entremont =

American ten-pin bowler (1961–2013)

Personal information
- Nicknames: Double D, Big D
- Born: David W. D'Entremont; June 15, 1961 Cleveland, Ohio, U.S.
- Died: October 12, 2013 (aged 52) Cleveland, Ohio, U.S.
- Years active: 1982-2011
- Height: 6 ft 1 in (185 cm)

Bowling Information
- Affiliation: PBA
- Dominant hand: Right
- Wins: 6 PBA Tour (1 major); 19 PBA regional
- 300-games: 50

Dave D'Entremont (June 15, 1961 – October 12, 2013) of Middleburg Heights, Ohio was an American professional 10-pin bowler and member of the Professional Bowlers Association PBA Tour. Over his nearly 30 year career, he won 6 national titles (including 1 major), was a 10-time runner-up, and appeared in the top-5 another 19 times. D'Entremont earned over $1.3 million in prize money on the PBA Tour.

D'Entremont made his first finals appearance at the 1989 ARC Pinole Open as the top seed, but was defeated by Ernie Schlegel 268–215 in the title match. Unfortunately, many TV viewers were unable to watch the match. The tournament's center (Pinole Valley Lanes) experienced a 15-minute power outage during Schlegel's preceding match against Ron Williams and because the Pro Bowlers Tour live telecasts on ABC Sports were contractually limited to only 90 minutes, ABC had to air the next program (Wide World of Sports) over the D'Entremont vs. Schlegel match. However, viewers did get live match updates with look-ins during Wide World's commercial breaks.

D'Entremont's first tour victory was at the 1992 PBA Fresno Open, defeating Marc McDowell 258–195 in the title match.

In 1995, D'Entremont had his best year on the PBA Tour as a nine time finalist, winning two titles (Choice Hotels Classic and the Peoria Open), earning the Harry Smith Points Leader Award and a career-high $184,075 in earnings, which was then a Tour record.

D'Entremont's lone major tour win was at the 1996 Brunswick World Tournament of Champions. Qualifying for the finals as a five-seed, he won all four matches in the stepladder format, including his title match win over Dave Arnold 215–202.

Dave's last PBA Tour victory took place at the 2002 Wichita Open, where he defeated Chris Barnes 202–179 in the championship match.

For all of D'Entremont's bowling accomplishments, he was inducted into both the Greater Cleveland Bowling and Ohio State Bowling Hall of Fame.

D'Entremont died on October 12, 2013 of an undisclosed illness at the age of 52.

== D'Entremont's PBA Tour titles ==
Major championships are in bold

- 1992 – Fresno Open (Fresno, California)
- 1994 – PBA Oregon Open (Eugene, Oregon)
- 1995 – Choice Hotels Classic (Sunrise, Florida)
- 1995 – Peoria Open (Peoria, Illinois)
- **1996 – Brunswick World Tournament of Champions** (Lake Zurich, Illinois)
- 2002 – PBA Wichita Open (Wichita, Kansas)
