= Cathy Dorin-Lizzi =

CatProfessional ten-pin bowler (born 1966)

Cathy Dorin-Lizzi (born December 18, 1966) is a professional ten-pin bowler who has won multiple national titles as a member of the Professional Women's Bowling Association.

Dorin-Lizzi, from Linden, New Jersey, is the sister of professional bowler Carolyn Dorin-Ballard.

As a professional bowler, Dorin-Lizzi was the AMF World Cup 3rd place finisher 1992. She won the PWBA Three Rivers Open in 1999.

Dorin-Lizzi and her sister Carolyn have been commentators on ESPN's bowling tournament coverage.

She is married to Pro Bowler Jeffrey Lizzi and both are residents of Sandusky, Ohio where the family owns and operates Star Lanes. Her husband won the 1992 Brunswick Memorial World Open, defeating PBA Hall of Famer Amleto Monacelli in the title match, 247-192
