= Carolyn Dorin-Ballard =

American bowling professional (born 1964)

- Born: 1964 (age 61–62); Linden, New Jersey, U.S.
- Education: West Texas State University (BA)
- Occupation: Ten-pin bowler
- Years active: 1990-present
- Spouse: Del Ballard Jr.
- Children: 1
- Relatives: Cathy Dorin-Lizzi (sister)
- Awards: PWBA Hall of Fame

Carolyn Dorin-Ballard (born 1964) is one of the top female ten-pin bowlers in the world. She is a member of the Professional Women's Bowling Association (1990–2003 and 2015–present) and has bowled in PBA Tournaments as well. She was an exempt competitor in the 2008–09 and 2009-10 PBA Women's Series seasons, which were sponsored by the United States Bowling Congress (USBC). Between the PWBA and the PBA Women's Series, she has won 22 professional titles. Carolyn was a 2008 inductee into the USBC Hall of Fame, and a 2020 inductee into the PWBA Hall of Fame.

Dorin-Ballard is a member of the Roto Grip Professional Staff, and also endorses Turbo 2-N-1 Grips, USBC and Ballard's Bowling Solutions. She has also served as the USBC's Director of Coaching.

== Personal and family ==
Her father was a POW during World War II.

Born and raised in Linden, New Jersey, she graduated from Linden High School in 1985.

Dorin-Ballard is married to PBA Hall of Famer Del Ballard Jr., whom she met in college. The couple has a daughter, Alyssa, and the family now resides in North Richland Hills, Texas. She is also the sister of former professional bowler and TV bowling analyst Cathy Dorin-Lizzi, who won a PWBA title in 1999. Her brother-in-law (Cathy's husband), Jeff Lizzi, was a member of the PBA and won a 1992 PBA Tour title.

Daughter Alyssa is a standout bowler for the Vanderbilt Commodores collegiate squad. In 2022, Carolyn and Alyssa won the PBA King of the Lanes: Royal Family Edition made-for-TV event. As the only mother-daughter combo in the competition, they eliminated Parker and Brandon Bohn in the semi-finals before defeating Chris and Ryan Barnes in the finals.

In bowling circles, Carolyn is often referred to by just the initials, "CDB."

== Bowling career ==
=== Amateur ===
Carolyn attended West Texas State University on a partial bowling scholarship. While there, she led the University to back to back national titles and was a three-time All-American. She was the MVP of the Intercollegiate Bowling Championships in 1989. She graduated in 1989 with a B.A. in Communications.

She has been a member of Team USA for multiple seasons. In 2011, she was part of the team that went to the WTBA World Women's Championships in Hong Kong and took home gold for the United States in the team event for the first time since 1987.

=== Professional ===
During the original existence of the PWBA Tour, Carolyn was one of its top bowlers. Carolyn had 20 Tour titles over a 14-year career (1990–2003). She won her first title in a doubles tournament in 1991 with her partner, Lisa Wagner, who was one of the top bowlers on the tour in the 1980s. Dorin-Ballard's first singles title was earned at the 1994 Lady Ebonite Classic. With the support of her sister and husband, her career really took off in 1997, when she began a string of eight titles in four seasons, beginning with the 1997 Three Rivers Classic. In that period she was the runner up in the Player of the Year voting all four seasons.

Among Dorin-Ballard's 20 PWBA titles (tied for seventh all-time) are three major championships (1997 and 2001 Brunswick World Open, 2001 WIBC Queens) and a Player of the Year award in 2001. The 2001 season was her career year. She won seven titles (including two of her three majors), posted an average of 214.73, and earned $135,045 in prize money. She received many honors this year including nomination for an ESPY award. She tied or broke 11 PWBA Tour records in 2001, including setting a record for most titles (7) and the most TV finals appearances (18) in a season.

In WIBC (now USBC) competition, she won three WIBC Titles (2000 All-Events Champion, 2001 Team Champion, 2004 Doubles Champion with Lynda Barnes). She was a seven-time WIBC All American and six-time Bowlers Journal All-American. Before the PWBA disbanded, she had moved up to sixth on the all-time Tour earnings list (over $910,000). She won two PBA Women's Series titles (2007 Great Lakes Classic and 2008 Cheetah Championship). She also won the PBA Women's Series Showdown, a non-title event held in April, 2009.

In 2006, she joined top female bowlers from around the world in the USBC Women's Challenge tournament. The event took place on a single lane, in the middle of a shopping mall in Las Vegas, Nevada. This event was particularly challenging, because all of the distractions of a mall (music, voices, people walking in the upper level) were present during the entire tournament. She made it to the semi-finals where she was defeated by Clara Guerrero. (Guerrero would go on to lose to Cara Honeychurch in the final.)

Following the disbandment of the PWBA in 2003, Dorin-Ballard started to bowl against men in PBA competition. In 2007, she became the first woman to bowl a perfect game in a PBA event, doing so in match play at the USBC Masters. As a member of the PBA Southwest Region, she once rolled back-to-back 300 games in a PBA Regional Tour event.

The only major missing from Dorin-Ballard's resume is the U.S. Women's Open, although she has made the semi-finals five times (2003, 2007, 2008, 2009 and 2010) with runner-up finishes in the 2003 and 2009 events.

Carolyn is known as one of the best female bowlers of all time, and at the Kegel training center also has the title of being the most accurate player in history of the testing center, hitting the exact target over 30 times in a row at exactly the same speed. During the PBA Women's Series Showdown in 2009, CDB rolled 20 consecutive strikes over two games to earn the distinction of rolling the most consecutive strikes in the history of televised bowling (male or female). (The previous mark of 18 consecutive strikes had been set by the PBA's Ryan Shafer two years earlier.) Currently a Roto Grip staffer, Carolyn is representing the brand with her recent bowling with Team USA and was on the roster for the PanAmerican games.

In 2014, Dorin-Ballard won the BPAA's Dick Weber Bowling Ambassador Award, an honor given annually to the "bowling athlete who has consistently shown grace on and off the lanes by promoting the sport of bowling in a positive manner."

In 2020, Dorin-Ballard was inducted into the PWBA Hall of Fame for Superior Performance.

Carolyn recently managed the New Jersey Kingpins PBA League team, with husband Del.

== List of professional titles ==
=== PWBA titles ===
Major championships in bold text. (Source: 11thframe.com)

1. 1991 LPBT National Doubles (w/Lisa Wagner)
2. 1994 Lady Ebonite Classic
3. 1997 Three Rivers Open
4. 1998 Greater Orlando Classic
5. **1998 Brunswick Women’s World Open**
6. 1999 Greater Jacksonville Open
7. 1999 Visionary Bowling Products Classic
8. 2000 Bowl for Blindness Classic
9. 2000 Greater San Diego Open
10. 2000 Three Rivers Open
11. **2001 WIBC Queens**
12. 2001 Albuquerque Open
13. 2001 Fort Worth Classic
14. 2001 Greater Memphis Open
15. 2001 Southern Virginia Open
16. 2001 Jacksonville Open
17. **2001 Brunswick Women’s World Open**
18. 2002 Dallas Open
19. 2002 Burlington Open
20. 2003 Greater Cincinnati Open

=== PBA Women's Series titles ===
1. 2007 Motor City Classic
2. 2008 Cheetah Championship

== Sources ==
- Carolyn Fan Website (some info outdated) (archived)
