= Jim Pencak =

American professional ten-pin bowler

Personal information
- Born: April 9, 1959 (age 67) Mayfield Heights, Ohio, U.S.
- Years active: 1982–1993
- Height: 5 ft 10 in (178 cm)

Bowling Information
- Affiliation: PBA
- Rookie year: 1982
- Dominant hand: Right
- Wins: 4 PBA Tour (1 major)
- 300-games: 6

Jim Pencak of Parma, Ohio is a former professional 10-pin bowler who was a member of the Professional Bowlers Association, bowling on the PBA Tour. During his eleven years on tour, Jim collected four titles (including one major), three time runner-up finishes, and made an additional ten appearances in the top-five.

All of Pencak's tour victories happened in 1989 and 1990, which includes his record winning streak of 16 consecutive televised final matches, still a PBA record. The start of Jim's streak was at the 1989 La Mode Classic in Green Bay (where he captured his first PBA title), where he needed to win four matches including his championship match victory over Dave Ferraro 231–218. The end of the steak also happened at the La Mode Classic in Green Bay (1991), where Pencak was defeated in the semifinal match by Tony Westlake 223–195.

Also a part of Pencak's TV final winning streak, his lone PBA major win at the 1990 PBA National Championship. Qualifying for the final rounds as the fourth seed, Jim won all four matches in the stepladder format culminating his 223–214 win over Chris Warren in the title match.

Pencak is a member of both the Greater Cleveland Bowling and Ohio State Bowling Hall of Fame.

== PBA Tour titles ==
Major championships are in bold type.

1. 1989 La Mode Classic (Green Bay, WI)
2. **1990 Society Bank PBA National Championship** (Toledo, OH)
3. 1990 Budweiser Open (North Olmsted, OH)
4. 1990 Showboat Atlantic City Open (Atlantic City, NJ)
