= Bryan Goebel =

American professional ten-pin bowler

Personal information
- Born: October 15, 1961 (age 64) Kansas City, Kansas, U.S.

Bowling Information
- Affiliation: PBA, PBA50
- Rookie year: 1988
- Dominant hand: Right
- Wins: 10 PBA Tour (1 major); 1 PBA50 Tour (major); 6 PBA Regional Tour; 6 PBA50 Regional Tour
- Sponsors: Ebonite

Bryan Goebel (born October 15, 1961, in Kansas City, Kansas) is a right-handed professional ten-pin bowler who currently resides in Shawnee, Kansas. He is a member of the Professional Bowlers Association. Having previously bowled on the PBA Tour, he now participates on the PBA50 Tour (formerly PBA Senior Tour) and PBA60 Tour. He has topped $1 million in career PBA earnings. Goebel's release style is that of a power stroker. He has the rev-rate and hook pattern of a cranker, but uses the smooth slide step of a stroker. Goebel is a 2016 inductee into the PBA Hall of Fame, and a 2025 inductee into the United States Bowling Congress (USBC) Hall of Fame.

Bryan is a pro staff member for Ebonite.

== PBA Tour ==
Goebel won his first PBA tournament at the 1990 Miller Lite Challenge. The following season, he won the Kessler Classic for his second title. In 1992, he had a chance to join an exclusive group of bowlers who have rolled a perfect 300 game in a televised PBA event. In the second match of that year's Japan Cup, he left a 10-pin on his final shot for a 299 game.

Goebel won four titles in the 1994 PBA season and cashed a career-high $172,182, but was beaten out for PBA Player of the Year honors by Norm Duke, who won five titles that same year. He won the Tucson Open in back-to-back seasons (1995 and 1996). He won his ninth title and lone PBA major at the 1998 PBA Tournament of Champions, held that season in his native Kansas. He defeated future PBA Hall of Famer Steve Hoskins, 245–235, for the title.

At the PBA Medford Open, held in January 2003, Goebel won his tenth PBA title, defeating Danny Wiseman 257–212. This victory made him eligible to go on the ballot for the PBA Hall of Fame.

Goebel also has six PBA Regional Tour and six PBA50 Regional Tour titles.

Goebel served as a color analyst for ESPN on a few broadcasts in the 1990s. He filled in for Marshall Holman in 1996 when Holman won his final PBA title.

=== Hall of Fame ===
After more than a decade of eligibility, Goebel was voted into the PBA Hall of Fame in December 2016. He was officially inducted on February 13, 2017. In his induction speech, Goebel spoke about the difficult decision to become a full-time touring pro:

"In 1988, I had been a pro bowler for eight years and didn't have a title. I quit my job and decided if I was ever going to be a (full time) pro, I had to do it now. I missed a cut and came home whining. My wife Kelly said, 'well, you quit your job; you’d better go out and bowl better.’"

In November 2024, Goebel was elected to the United States Bowling Congress (USBC) Hall of Fame. He was officially inducted with the 2025 class in a ceremony at the USBC convention on May 7.

== PBA50 Tour ==
After participating in 50 tournaments on the PBA50 Tour without a win, Goebel won his first PBA50 Tour title on May 16, 2017, at the PBA50 Miller Lite Players Championship in Indianapolis. This is considered a major title for PBA50 players. Qualifying as the #2 seed, Goebel defeated top seed and fellow PBA Hall of Famer Parker Bohn III in the final match.

== Goebel's PBA titles ==
Major championships are in bold type.

=== PBA Tour ===
1990 – Miller Lite Challenge (Tucson, AZ)
1991 – Kessler Classic (Riverside, CA)
1994 – True Value Open (Peoria, IL)
1994 – Active West Open (Ontario, CA)
1994 – Greater Detroit Open (Taylor, MI)
1994 – Merit Mixed Doubles Championship (w/Aleta Sill) (Reno, NV)
1995 – Tucson PBA Open (Tucson, AZ)
1996 – Tucson Open (Tucson, AZ)
1998 – Brunswick World Tournament of Champions (Overland Park, KS)
2003 – PBA Medford Open (Medford, OR)

=== PBA50 Tour ===
2017 – PBA50 Miller Lite Players Championship (Indianapolis, IN)
