= Bob Learn Jr. =

American ten-pin bowler

Personal information
- Born: April 4, 1962 (age 64) Erie, Pennsylvania, U.S.

Bowling Information
- Affiliation: PBA, PBA50
- Rookie year: 1984
- Dominant hand: Right
- Wins: 5 PBA Tour (1 major); 3 PBA50 Tour; 25 PBA Regional Tour; 4 PBA50 Regional Tour
- Sponsors: Brunswick, Ultimate Inserts

Robert Learn Jr. (born April 4, 1962) is a professional ten-pin bowler and bowling coach. He formerly competed on the Professional Bowlers Association (PBA) Tour and is currently active on the PBA50 Tour. He is nicknamed "Mr. 300", having rolled over 100 perfect games between PBA and sanctioned USBC competition. Learn was inducted into the USBC Hall of Fame (Veterans category) in 2020. He is also a member of the Erie Bowling and Pennsylvania State Bowling Halls of Fame.

Learn Jr. is a member of the Brunswick pro staff.

== Bowling career ==
Learn became a PBA member in 1981, bowling mostly in PBA Regional Tour events until joining the national PBA Tour full-time in 1984. He won five PBA Tour titles during his career, including a major at the 1999 U.S. Open, but is most noted for:

- Rolling the PBA's 10th televised 300 game in the opening match of the final round at the PBA Flagship Open, earning a $100,000 bonus. The event was held in Learn's hometown of Erie, Pennsylvania, on April 6, 1996.
- Setting the all-time PBA record for total pins in a four-game TV final at the same event. Learn shot games of 300, 270, 280 and 279 for a total of 1,129. This shattered the previous PBA record of 1,070 pins, set in 1995 by David Ozio. In the four matches, Learn recorded 44 of a possible 48 strikes. This was easily the highest-scoring televised finals in PBA Tour history, as the four opponents Learn bowled against (Johnny Petraglia, John Mazza, Parker Bohn III, and Randy Pedersen) combined for 1,084 pins, 14 more than Ozio's 4-game record.

Learn's fifth and final PBA Tour title came in 2001 at the Dydo Japan Cup. He also has ten career runner-up finishes on the PBA Tour, and has earned over $1 million in PBA events.

He joined the PBA Senior Tour (renamed the PBA50 Tour) in 2012, and has three titles on that tour to date. He also has 25 PBA Regional Tour titles and four PBA50 Regional Tour titles.

=== PBA Tour titles ===
Major championships in bold.

1. 1992 Fair Lanes Open (Baltimore, Maryland)
2. 1993 Bud Light Hall of Fame Championship (Richmond Heights, Missouri)
3. 1996 Flagship Open (Erie, Pennsylvania)
4. **1999 U.S. Open** (Uncasville, Connecticut)
5. 2001 Dydo Japan Cup (Tokyo, Japan)

=== PBA50 Tour titles ===
1. 2012 PBA Senior Mooresville Classic (Mooresville, North Carolina)
2. 2013 PBA50 Pasco County Suncoast Open (New Port Richey, Florida)
3. 2015 PBA/PBA50 South Shore Doubles w/DJ Archer (Hammond, Indiana)

== Coaching career ==
In May 2017, with over 25 years of coaching experience, he accepted the position of head men's and women's bowling coach for the Martin Methodist RedHawks in Pulaski, Tennessee (now the Tennessee Southern Firehawks). He was named NAIA Men's Bowling Coach of the Year in the 2019–20 and 2020–21 seasons. He was also named 2023 USBC Men's Coach of the Year.

Learn created TurboTech Collegiate Expo, which he designed specifically for college recruitment. He has conducted numerous bowling clinics around the world and has been a past coach for Team USA.

In 2020, Learn was named manager of the expansion Miami Waves PBA League team.

== Personal ==
Originally from Erie, Pennsylvania, Learn now resides in Spring Hill, Tennessee. Bob is married to his wife Stacey, and the couple have two children.
