= Del Ballard Jr. =

American ten-pin bowler

Personal information
- Born: Delmas Perry Ballard Jr. July 1, 1963 (age 63) Keller, Texas, U.S.
- Home town: North Richland Hills, Texas, U.S.
- Years active: 1982–2007 (competition)
- Height: 5 ft 10 in (178 cm)

Sport
- Sport: Ten-pin bowling
- Turned pro: 1982

Achievements and titles
- National finals: 13 PBA Tour (4 majors); 17 PBA Regional Tour
Medal record
Representing United States
World Senior Championships
Silver medal – second place	2013 Las Vegas	Fours
Bronze medal – third place	2013 Las Vegas	Doubles

Delmas Perry Ballard Jr. (born July 1, 1963) is an American professional ten-pin bowler and member of the Professional Bowlers Association. He was a 2009 inductee into the PBA Hall of Fame, and a 2011 inductee into the USBC Hall of Fame. Ballard is the husband of top female bowler Carolyn Dorin-Ballard with whom he has one daughter. The Ballard family now resides in North Richland Hills, Texas. He is also the brother-in-law of another top female bowler, Cathy Dorin-Lizzi.

In recent years, Ballard has appeared laneside in several televised PBA matches, as a ball representative and coach for Storm Bowling.

== Bowling career ==
Ballard entered the PBA Tour in 1982 at the age of 19. He won two titles in 1987, including his first major at the U.S. Open Championship which earned him a then-record $100,000. In 1988, Ballard won his second major, the ABC Masters. (The Masters was not considered a PBA Tour event at the time, but is now recognized as a PBA title and a major). He went on to win two additional majors, the 1989 Firestone Tournament of Champions and the 1993 U.S. Open. In 1991, he had his most successful year on the tour, making nine final round appearances and winning four titles, but he was beaten out for PBA Player of the Year by David Ozio. He won 13 PBA Titles in his career (all between 1987 and 1993) and has career total earnings of $1,176,912.

In his career, Ballard cashed in 287 of 518 tournaments. He had a 30–21 record in televised PBA finals, with a 216.29 average. He made 35 top-5 finishes while making it all the way to the final match 17 times, compiling an impressive 13–4 record in those matches.

No longer an active bowler on the standard PBA Tour, Ballard continues to work on tour as a ball rep/coach for Storm. He managed the Motown Muscle PBA League team for several years, while wife Carolyn managed the NYC Kingpins.

=== PBA Tour titles ===
Major championships in bold text.

1. **1987 Seagram's Coolers U.S. Open** (Tacoma, WA)
2. 1987 Brunswick Memorial World Open (Glendale Heights, IL)
3. **1988 Bud Light ABC Masters** (Jacksonville, FL)
4. 1989 Showboat Invitational (Las Vegas, NV)
5. 1989 Quaker State Open (Grand Prairie, TX)
6. **1989 Firestone Tournament of Champions** (Akron, OH)
7. 1991 Leisure's Long Island Open (Sayville, NY)
8. 1991 Beaumont PBA Doubles Classic w/Bob Benoit (Beaumont, TX)
9. 1991 Kessler Open (Dublin, CA)
10. 1991 Cambridge Mixed Doubles Classic w/Nikki Gianulias (Reno, NV)
11. 1992 Toyota Long Island Open (Sayville, NY)
12. 1992 PBA Oregon Open (Portland, OR)
13. **1993 BPAA U.S. Open** (Canandaigua, NY)

== The "Ballard Gutter-Ball" Moment ==
On March 2, 1991, Ballard was on the receiving end of one of the most bizarre and infamous incidents in PBA history. In the nationally televised championship match at the 1991 Fair Lanes Open tournament in Baltimore, Ballard faced Pete Weber for the title. Weber closed off with three strikes in the tenth frame, putting Ballard in a position where he needed two strikes and at least seven pins on the third ball to win. Ballard did throw the two strikes that he needed, but the third shot came too close to the right channel and fell in, thus handing Pete Weber the title. Ballard recovered from this loss a few weeks later, defeating Jim Johnson Jr. to win the Long Island Open.

Ballard said the gutter ball incident changed him forever, and not in the way many would think:

"The next week was in New Jersey. As soon as I checked in, I received a phone call in my room. It was a male who asked if I was Del Ballard. I said 'yes'. The next comment...he says, 'you threw the ball in the gutter against Pete and it cost me, and now I’m going to get you.' I immediately hung up and called the front desk. I know I joke around a lot and expected some razzing from the guys, but they said this same person had called the hotel numerous times during the day from an outside number. I immediately checked out and changed hotels. I was a changed man from that day forward. I knew then the impact of what you do on the grand stage."

== Personal life ==
Ballard is married to Carolyn and the two have a daughter, Alyssa. Alyssa is a standout bowler for Vanderbilt University.

It was announced on PBA.com in August 2010, that Ballard was battling tonsil cancer. He underwent chemotherapy and radiation treatments at Texas Oncology, an affiliate of Baylor University Medical Center, and prognosis for a full recovery was good. Wanting to turn a negative into a positive, he and wife Carolyn, along with a few friends, got together after one of his treatments and organized the "Ballard vs. The Big C" bowling tournament. By 2017, the tournament had raised over $300,000, which was donated to Cancer Care Services, Baylor Health Care and the North Texas Laryngectomy Society. Ballard was recognized by the PBA for his efforts, being presented with the PBA Tony Reyes Community Service Award for the 2017 season.

== Notable accomplishments ==
- Won 13 PBA titles, including four majors
- Ballard was a PBA World Championship short of completing both a Triple Crown and Grand Slam. (The Triple Crown for PBA Bowlers is The U.S. Open, PBA World Championship and Tournament of Champions. To complete the Grand Slam, a bowler must also win the USBC Masters.)
- Became the 11th bowler in PBA History to surpass $1 million in career earnings in 1994.
- Won the first six-figure first place prize in PBA History ($100,000 at the 1987 U.S. Open).
- Was ranked #29 on the PBA's 2008 list of "50 Greatest Players of the Last 50 Years."
- Inducted into the PBA Hall of Fame on January 24, 2009.
- Inducted into the USBC Hall of Fame on July 1, 2011.
