= Marc McDowell =

American professional bowler

Personal information
- Born: May 12, 1962 (age 64) Madison, Wisconsin, U.S.
- Education: Monona Grove High School (Monona, WI); West Texas A&M University (Canyon, TX)
- Years active: 1986-1996
- Height: 5 ft 8 in (173 cm)
- Spouse: Kerri Stoner McDowell

Bowling Information
- Affiliation: PBA
- Rookie year: 1986 (Rookie of the Year)
- Dominant hand: Right (tweener)
- Wins: 5 PBA Tour (1 Major); 1992 BWAA Bowler of the Year
- Sponsors: MOTIV Bowling; VISE

Marc McDowell (born May 12, 1962) of Madison, Wisconsin, is an American right-handed professional ten-pin bowler who competed on the PBA Tour circuit from 1986 to 1996. Overall on tour, Marc captured 5 tour championships, including 1 major. Additionally, Marc also has 7 runner-up finishes along with another 13 appearances in the top 5.

His strong rookie year (1986) earned him that season's PBA Rookie of the Year award, including a runner-up finish at the Ebonite-Firebolt Open plus placing third at the King Louie Open.

1992 proved to be McDowell's most successful season on the tour. Marc collected 3 victories including a major win at the 1992 PBA Firestone Tournament of Champions with a 223-193 victory over Don Genalo in the final match. Furthermore, with Marc being the tour's top earner with $176,215, he was voted Bowler of the Year by the Bowling Writers Association of America.

En route to winning the AC-Delco Classic in 1992 (January 11), McDowell is also remembered for being the first bowler to use a reactive resin bowling ball (Nu-Line Xcalibur) on television.

== PBA Tour titles ==
Major championships are in bold type.

1. 1989 – Fresno Open (Fresno, CA)
2. 1989 – Senior/Touring Pro Doubles Championship with Dick Weber (Buffalo, NY)
3. 1992 – AC-Delco Classic (Torrance, CA)
4. 1992 – **PBA Firestone Tournament of Champions** (Akron, OH)
5. 1992 – Rochester Open (Rochester, NY)

== Additional Awards ==
- 1986 PBA Rookie of the Year
- 1992 BWAA Bowler of the Year
