= Dave Ferraro =

American professional bowler

Personal information
- Born: David Ferraro; June 8, 1959 (age 67) Kingston, New York, U.S.
- Home town: Kingston, New York, U.S.
- Education: John A. Coleman Catholic High School (Hurley, NY)
- Years active: 1979−1995
- Height: 173 cm (5 ft 8 in)
- Weight: 160 lb (73 kg)

Sport
- Country: United States
- Sport: Ten-pin bowling
- League: PBA
- Turned pro: 1979
- Retired: 1995

Achievements and titles
- National finals: 10 PBA Tour (3 majors, 1 doubles); PBA Player of the Year (1992); PBA’s 50 Greatest Players

David Ferraro (born June 8, 1959) is an American retired professional bowler who won ten titles on the Professional Bowlers Tour and was inducted into the PBA Hall of Fame in 1997. Ferraro was ranked 36th on the list of the 50 Greatest PBA Bowlers of all time, in a 2008 poll honoring the PBA's 50th anniversary.

Ferraro won three major championships among his ten PBA Tour titles. He was the first bowler to win the Touring Players Championship twice (1988, 1991) and was the 1990 Firestone Tournament of Champions winner.

== Early life ==
Ferraro was born to John "Jack" Ferraro Jr. and Lorraine (née Secreto) Ferraro in Kingston, New York and graduated from John A. Coleman Catholic High School in nearby Hurley, New York. Ferraro's family, Southern Italian immigrants from Calabria, settled in Ulster County, New York around the turn of the 20th century. Ferraro's great-grandfather, Francesco "Frank" Ferraro, who listed his occupation as a barber, came to New York from Cittanova, Calabria, Italy in 1889. The Ferraro family eventually settled in the hamlet of Glasco, New York where the family later got into the bowling business. Dave's grandfather, John Ferraro Sr., one of 21 children, owned and operated several bowling lanes in Kingston before purchasing Bowlerama Lanes. Jack Ferraro took over the business from his father while simultaneously taking up harness racing as a driver, horse trainer and owner. While Dave picked up his father's love and talent for bowling, his battles with hay fever prevented him from also going into harness racing.

Ferraro began bowling when he was two years old and by the time he turned four had bowled a 156 game. By age 16, in 1976, Ferraro was averaging 190 in men's league play and after graduating from Coleman Catholic High School Ferraro began bowling local tournaments. In 1979, Dave and his brother Steve joined the Professional Bowlers Association.

== Professional career ==
Ferraro began competing in PBA Regional tournaments around the northeast, bowling against the likes of Johnny Petraglia and Teata Semiz before making his first televised appearance on the Pro Bowlers Tour in 1980 at the Long Island Open in Garden City, New York. To reach the tournament finals, Ferraro bowled a 10-game block of 2,264 to lead a pack of 115 non-exempt bowlers and enter the main tournament field. From there, Ferraro moved up to eighth place after four rounds, and qualified fifth for the final, televised round of the tournament. Coincidentally, it was also be the first televised appearance of fellow future hall of famer Pete Weber, son of the legendary Dick Weber. Ferraro was defeated in the first match by Arnie Goldman of Chicago 194–163, earning Ferraro $3,500.

Ferraro didn't reach the final round again on the professional tour until 1985 at the Austin Open, where he finished third. At the time his 279–278 loss to Mark Baker was the highest losing score in a final-round match in PBA history. The following year Ferraro earned his first professional victory at the 1986 Budweiser Classic over John Gant. In that tournament, he was in 72nd place after the second round before storming through the rest of qualifying to finish as the top seed. "I feel great," Ferraro told the Poughkeepsie Journal after the win. "Having the title is a good feeling and one that will give me confidence in the future. I got the monkey off my back and now I know I can win."

He won again the next season, beating Brian Voss at the Miller Lite Open in suburban Cleveland, and posted three other top-five finishes.

But it would be 1988 when Ferraro put it all together, winning three times on tour including the Budweiser Touring Players Championship, his first major title, by defeating Walter Ray Williams Jr., 212–195. In the final match, Williams uncharacteristically missed a ten-pin spare in the second frame but Ferraro followed with back-to-back spares and was unable to capitalize. Williams then struck in the third, fourth and fifth frames to retake the lead. Ferraro kept pace and, in the sixth frame, Williams again missed a ten-pin on the right lane of the pair. With the miss, Ferraro went from trailing by ten pins to leading by three in the seventh frame. The game was tied entering the tenth frame with Williams needing two strikes and eight pins to win, but he left the 3–6–10 on his first shot of the frame to give Ferraro the win.

Ferraro made the final round seven times in 1989, finishing in second place in five times including a loss to Pete Weber at the PBA National Championship in Toledo, Ohio, while earning over $100,000 for the second consecutive season.

He won his second major title at the 1990 Firestone Tournament of Champions as the top-seeded player. Ferraro overcame an ugly start to the championship match, badly missing a 2–10 split followed by consecutive spares, by stringing five strikes in a row to defeat his tour roommate and best friend Tony Westlake 226–203.

The next year saw Ferraro win the Players Championship again, this time over Roger Bowker (who was on the telecast the first time Ferraro won in 1989) while making eight television appearances.

Ferraro continued his solid play in 1992, making nine final rounds and winning at the Johnny Petraglia Open in March and the Active West PBA Open in June on his way to earning the George Young High Average Award and the Harry Smith Point Leader Award. That effort was enough to earn Ferraro PBA Player of the Year honors for the first and only time in his career.

All told, from 1987 to 1993 Ferraro won $829,411 on the professional tour and retired as the 17th bowler in PBA history to earn one million dollars in a career.

Ferraro earned his tenth and final PBA Tour title at the 1994 Great Lakes Classic. His last tournament as a regular competitor came at the 1995 PBA National Championship. Disdainful of traveling and being away from his family, Ferraro retired prior to the 1996 PBA Tour season. "I did it for 12 years," Ferraro said. "It was time to get out."

Ferraro briefly came back from retirement in 2006 after PBA Commissioner Fred Schreyer awarded him a tour exemption to bowl in the 2006 Columbia 300 Classic, which was held about 135 miles from his home in Kingston in West Babylon, New York.

=== PBA Tour titles ===
Major championships are in bold type.

1. 1986 Budweiser Classic (Columbus, Ohio)
2. 1987 Miller Lite Open (North Olmsted, Ohio)
3. 1988 Showboat PBA Doubles Classic (with Joe Berardi) (Las Vegas, Nevada)
4. 1988 Number 7 PBA Invitational (Calgary, Alberta, Canada)
5. **1988 Budweiser Touring Players Championship** (Taylor, Michigan)
6. **1990 Firestone Tournament of Champions** (Akron, Ohio)
7. **1991 Budweiser Touring Players Championship** (Taylor, Michigan)
8. 1992 Johnny Petraglia Open (North Brunswick, New Jersey)
9. 1992 Active West PBA Open (Riverside, California)
10. 1994 Great Lakes Classic (Wyoming, Michigan)

== Legacy ==
Ferraro was inducted into the PBA Hall of Fame in 1997 and, along with Diandra Asbaty was elected to the USBC Hall of Fame in 2023. In 2007, Ferraro was inducted into the National Italian American Sports Hall of Fame alongside such luminaries as Geno Auriemma, Fred Couples, and fellow professional bowler, PWBA Hall of Fame member Robin Romeo.

== Awards and recognition ==
- PBA Player of the Year (1992)
- 10 PBA Tour championships, including three major titles
- Inducted into PBA Hall of Fame, 1997
- Inducted into National Italian American Sports Hall of Fame, 2007
- Inducted into USBC Hall of Fame, 2023
- Ranked No. 36 in a 2008 poll of the PBA's 50 Greatest Players
