= Steve Hoskins =

American professional ten-pin bowler

Personal information
- Born: January 9, 1969 (age 57) Woburn, Massachusetts, U.S.
- Years active: 1989–2004

Bowling Information
- Affiliation: PBA
- Rookie year: 1989
- Dominant hand: Right (power stroker delivery)
- Wins: 10 PBA Tour (2 majors); 1989 PBA Rookie of the Year
- Sponsors: Track, Vise Grips

Steve Hoskins (born January 9, 1969) is a retired professional ten-pin bowler who was a member of the Professional Bowlers Association (PBA). He won ten titles on the PBA Tour, including two major championships. Originally from Woburn, Massachusetts, Hoskins started bowling at age 4 when his family moved to Tarpon Springs, Florida in 1973.

Hoskins joined the PBA Tour in 1989 and won PBA Rookie of the Year honors that year. After three trips to the televised finals, including runner-up finishes in 1990 and 1991, Hoskins won his first PBA Tour title at the 1993 Quaker State Open. He would successfully defend his title at the same tournament in 1994. He went on to win a total of ten PBA Tour titles in an eight-season stretch.

The 1997 season provided his most shining moments. On October 15 of that year, he rolled the PBA's 12th-ever televised 300 game in the semifinal match of the Ebonite Challenge, defeating Walter Ray Williams Jr. He then went on to win the tournament in the next match, besting top seed Rick Steelsmith with a clutch double in the tenth frame to earn $21,000 plus a $10,000 bonus for the perfect game. Less than a month later, he won his first major title at the Bayer/Brunswick Touring Players Championship, defeating Danny Wiseman in the championship match to earn his largest single paycheck ($40,000) to that point of his career.

He won a second major at the 1999 Touring Players Championship. His final title was on November 1, 2000, at the Lone Star Open. His final televised finals appearance (of his 31 career top-five finishes) was on March 2, 2003, at the PBA Odor-Eaters Open.

Hoskins spent a year as PBA President (2003) and retired after the 2004 season to spend more time with family and children. He ran a used car dealership and operated a subprime lending company in Hudson, Florida for many years after. He made a brief comeback on the PBA50 Tour in 2019.

In 2017, he was inducted into the PBA Hall of Fame for superior performance.

For much of his career, Hoskins was sponsored by Track bowling (later a division of Ebonite International).

== PBA Tour titles ==
Major championships are in bold text.

1. 1993 Quaker State Open (Grand Prairie, TX)
2. 1994 Quaker State Open (Grand Prairie, TX)
3. 1994 Tucson Open (Tucson, AZ)
4. 1996 Comfort Inn Classic (Sunrise, FL)
5. 1997 Ebonite Challenge 2 (Rochester, NY)
6. **1997 Bayer/Brunswick PBA Touring Players Championship** (Pittsburgh, PA)
7. 1998 AC-Delco Classic (Lakewood, CA)
8. 1998 Phillip Morris Mixed Doubles w/Kim Canady (Las Vegas, NV)
9. **1999 Bayer/Brunswick PBA Touring Players Championship** (Akron, OH)
10. 2000 Lone Star Open (Pasadena, TX)

== Awards and honors ==
- 1989 PBA Rookie of the Year
- Rolled the PBA's 12th televised 300 game in 1997
- 2017 PBA Hall of Fame inductee
