= Aleta Sill =

American bowler (born 1962)

Aleta Sill (née Rzepecki, born September 9, 1962) is a retired American professional ten-pin bowler and current bowling coach from Dearborn Heights, Michigan. She competed nationally on the Professional Women's Bowling Association (PWBA) Tour from 1980 through 2001. In her career, the left-handed Sill won 31 titles (second most on the official PWBA list), including six major championships. She was the first female bowler to eclipse $1 million in career earnings. Aleta is a 1996 inductee into both the PWBA Hall of Fame and the USBC Hall of Fame.

For most of her career, Sill was a member of the Ebonite national pro staff.

== Early life ==
Aleta says her parents named her after the character Princess Aleta from the Prince Valiant comic strip series.

Aleta began bowling at age 5 when her maternal grandparents, Steve and Adeline Zuke, let her roll a few balls after their league session at Oxford Lanes in Dearborn, Michigan. After seeing her struggle, Steve jokingly told her, "We're not paying for gutter balls; you have to learn to keep it on the lane." Steve promised he'd buy her a ball and shoes if she bowled a score of at least 80. "It didn't take me long to break 100 and fall in love with the game," said Aleta.

She participated regularly in youth leagues, and in 1976, her youth coach Joe Naso took her to watch a professional women's tournament that had come to the Detroit area. From that point on, Aleta was determined to become a professional bowler. Said Aleta in 2015, "I played other sports in school, but bowling was the one thing I always stuck with."

== Professional career ==
After graduating from Crestwood High School in Dearborn Heights, Aleta joined the PWBA in the summer of 1980, with grandparents Steve and Adeline agreeing to pay her tournament entry fees that season. She entered her first pro tournament in August of that year, the Stroh Light Classic in Rochester, Michigan, and finished 11th. After a heartbreaking second-place finish at the Stardust Classic in 1981 (a total pins event which she lost 9,439–9,435 to Donna Adamek), 19-year old Aleta won the season's next tour stop, the Gallery of Homes Classic in Los Angeles, for her first professional title.

While struggling through a winless 1982 season, Aleta began to question if she should continue a career as a professional bowler. Those questions were put to rest when she won her second title and first major championship at the 1983 WIBC Queens. She won a second title in 1983 at the Dallas-Fort Worth Classic, and was the Tour's leading money winner that season. In between these two 1983 titles, Aleta Rzepecki married David Sill and became known as Aleta Sill. They later divorced. Her career really took off in 1984, when she won five titles, including a major at the Sam's Town LPBT Tournament of Champions, and was voted by her peers as the 1984 Player of the Year. She was also named Bowler of the Year in both 1984 and 1985 by the Bowling Writers Association of America (BWAA). The 1985 season saw her win three titles, including her second WIBC Queens crown.

After she won only one title between 1990 and 1992, Sill's career resurged. She won 13 titles between 1993 and 1998 to reach the 30-title plateau, including two wins in the U.S. Women's Open major (1994 and 1998). The 1998 victory made Sill the first bowler, male or female, to win her sport's triple crown twice (two WIBC Queens titles, two U.S. Open titles and two Sam's Town Invitational titles). The feat was eventually matched on the men's PBA Tour by Pete Weber in 2013. Aleta won the Merit Mixed Doubles Championship three times in four years (1993, 1994 and 1996) with three different partners.

Sill's final title was earned at the 2000 Greater Atlanta Open. She retired from professional bowling after the 2001 season, having won 31 titles, just one shy of the PWBA record set by Lisa Wagner two years earlier.

In addition to her PWBA accolades, Sill won five titles in the WIBC (now USBC) Open Championships. She won all-events titles in 1982 and 1985, a singles title in 1983, and a team title in 1995. Ten years after her PWBA career ended, she won the USBC Open Doubles title with Michelle Feldman in 2011. She is one of a very few women to have a title in all four WIBC/USBC Open categories.

Sill says she has rolled "35 or 36" perfect 300 games, including one at a 1984 tournament that she listed as one of her top bowling memories. "My first 300 game [was] bowled in Dallas, Texas in 1984. I won a white Mustang convertible. Now that was great!"

Sill is a member of eight halls of fame, including the PWBA Hall of Fame (inducted 1996), the USBC Hall of Fame (inducted in 1996), the National Polish-American Sports Hall of Fame (inducted 2008) and the Michigan Sports Hall of Fame (inducted 2015).

== Later career ==
Since her retirement from competitive bowling, Sill has enjoyed a second career as a pro shop owner and bowling coach. She says, "At this point in my life, I just love helping someone bowl better because of what I have learned." She currently owns Aleta Sill's Bowling World in Farmington Hills, Michigan, and co-owns Your Bowling Coach with four-time PWBA champion and USBC gold-certified coach Michelle Mullen. Sill herself is a USBC silver-certified coach. She now makes her home in Livonia, Michigan.

== Professional titles ==
Major championships in bold text. (Source: 11thframe.com)

1. 1981 Gallery of Homes Classic
2. **1983 WIBC Queens**
3. 1983 Dallas-Fort Worth Classic
4. 1984 Robby's Florida Classic
5. 1984 McCall's Patterns Classic
6. 1984 Ladies Hammer Classic
7. 1984 Dallas Classic
8. **1984 Sam's Town LPBT Tournament of Champions**
9. **1985 WIBC Queens**
10. 1985 Northwest Fabrics Classic
11. 1985 Hammer Western Open
12. **1986 Sam's Town Invitational**
13. 1987 Columbia 300 Invitational
14. 1987 Brunswick Classic
15. 1989 Michigan Classic
16. 1989 Hammer Eastern Open
17. 1991 New Orleans Classic
18. 1993 LPBT National Doubles (w/Laurie Soto)
19. 1993 Merit Mixed Doubles Championship (w/Parker Bohn III)
20. 1994 Rocket City Challenge
21. **1994 U.S. Women's Open**
22. 1994 Columbia 300 Delaware Open
23. 1994 Merit Mixed Doubles Championship (w/Bryan Goebel)
24. 1995 Texas Border Shoot-Out
25. 1995 Lady Ebonite Classic
26. 1996 Greater Charleston Open
27. 1996 Merit Mixed Doubles Championship (w/Mark Williams)
28. 1997 AMF Gold Cup
29. **1998 U.S. Women's Open**
30. 1998 Southern Virginia Open
31. 2000 Greater Atlanta Open

== Accomplishments and honors ==
- 31 PWBA Tour titles (6 majors)
- 5 WIBC/USBC Open Championships titles, including at least one title in all four categories (singles, doubles, team and all-events)
- 1984 PWBA Player of the Year
- Two-time BWAA Woman Bowler of the Year (1984, 1985)
- Six-time PWBA Tour leading money winner (1983–1986, 1993 and 1994)
- Nine-time WIBC All-American (1983–1986 and 1994–1998)
- PWBA Hall of Fame Inductee (1996)
- WIBC (now USBC) Hall of Fame inductee (1996)
- First female bowler to reach $1 million in career earnings
- First professional bowler to win the triple crown (WIBC Queens, U.S. Women's Open and Sam's Town Invitational/TOC) twice in a career
- Named a Detroit Dream Team Legendary Athlete, a group that includes hockey great Gordie Howe and boxing legend Joe Louis
