= Butch Soper =

American professional ten-pin bowler

Personal information
- Born: June 17, 1949 (age 77) Newport Beach, Califiornia, U.S.
- Years active: 1972–2001
- Height: 5 ft 6 in (168 cm)

Bowling Information
- Affiliation: PBA
- Dominant hand: Right (stroker delivery)
- Wins: 6 PBA Tour (1 major); 1 PBA Senior Tour
- 300-games: 19

Butch Soper of Lake Havasu City, Arizona is a retired professional 10-pin bowler and member of the Professional Bowlers Association, who bowled on the PBA Tour. During his 29 years on tour, Butch won 6 titles (including a major and a mixed doubles win), 11 runner-up finishes, and another 15 appearances in the top-5.

After joining the PBA Tour in 1972, it took Soper 6 years to capture his first tournament win at the 1978 Fair Lanes Open. As the Open's top seed going into the finals, Butch defeated George Pappas in the title match 199-184.

On July 12, 1994, at the Hilton Hotels Classic in Reno, Nevada, Soper rolled a perfect 300 game against Bob Benoit. It was the 8th perfect game aired on live television and the first time a televised 300 was bowled to beat another player who had previously bowled a 300 on TV as Benoit did so at the 1988 PBA Quaker State Open.

Butch's lone major and last victory of his PBA Tour career, was at the 1996 PBA National Championship. Qualifying for the final rounds as the #2 seed, Soper won his semifinal match with a 216–214 victory over Justin Hromek and then triumphed over Walter Ray Williams, Jr. 226–210 in the title match.

On the PBA Senior Tour, Soper snagged one title at the 2000 PBA Seattle Senior Open, defeating Norb Wentzel 222-210 in the championship match.

Soper is a member of the Orange County USBC Hall of Fame.

== Soper's Bowling Titles ==
Major Major championships are in bold type.

=== PBA Tour ===
1. 1978 Fair Lanes Open (Towson, MD)
2. 1984 AC-Delco Classic (Alameda, CA)
3. 1989 King Louie Open (Overland Park, KS)
4. 1990 Kessler Open (Dublin, CA)
5. 1995 Merit Mixed Doubles Championship w/ Kim Canady (Las Vegas, NV)
6. **1996 PBA National Championship** (Toledo, OH)

=== PBA Senior Tour ===
1. 2000 PBA Seattle Senior Open (Seattle, WA)
