= Dave Husted =

American ten-pin bowler (born 1960)

David Husted
Personal information
- Born: April 12, 1960 (age 66) Milwaukie, Oregon, U.S.
- Years active: 1978–2019
- Height: 6 ft 2 in (188 cm)

Bowling Information
- Affiliation: PBA
- Rookie year: 1978
- Dominant hand: Right
- Wins: 14 PBA Tour (including 4 majors); 26 PBA Regional Tour
- 300-games: 15

David Husted (born April 12, 1960), of Milwaukie, Oregon, is a retired professional ten-pin bowler and member of the Professional Bowlers Association (PBA). He was inducted into the PBA Hall of Fame in 1996, and became a member of the USBC Hall of Fame in 2012.

A right-handed bowler, Husted joined the PBA in 1978 and won 14 titles on the PBA Tour, including four major championships. He was one of the most dominant bowlers in the prestigious U.S. Open, a PBA major which he won three times (1982, 1995 and 1996). Only Pete Weber has won more modern-day U.S. Open titles (5). He won the 1982 event for his first PBA title at age 21, making him the youngest-ever winner of the U.S. Open as of 2021. The 1995 U.S. Open victory was in front of the largest crowd to ever witness a PBA event: 7,212 at Joe Louis Arena in Detroit, MI. To date (2021), Husted is the last bowler to successfully defend a U.S. Open title (1995 and 1996), and the only bowler in the modern era (since 1971) to do so. Aside from the U.S. Open victories, he earned one other major tournament win at the 1985 Touring Players Championship.

Husted was well respected by his peers, winning back-to-back PBA Steve Nagy Sportsmanship Awards in 1988 and 1989. He was also the ninth PBA player in history to eclipse the $1 million mark in career earnings. Dave was ranked #23 on the PBA's 2008 list of "50 Greatest Players of the Last 50 Years."

Husted also won 26 PBA Regional Tour titles.

Husted is owner/operator of Milwaukie Bowl in Milwaukie, OR and Hazel Dell Lanes in Vancouver, WA.

== Husted's PBA Tour titles ==
Major championships are in bold type.

1. 1982 – **BPAA U.S. Open** (Houston, TX)
2. 1982 – Sarasota Open (Sarasota, FL)
3. 1985 – **Touring Players Championship** (Saginaw, MI)
4. 1986 – Kessler Open (Dublin, CA)
5. 1986 – Miller Lite Challenge (Tucson, AZ)
6. 1988 – La Mode Classic (Green Bay, WI)
7. 1990 – Showboat Invitational (Las Vegas, NV)
8. 1993 – Brunswick Memorial World Open (Lake Zurich, IL)
9. 1994 – Northwest Classic (Kennewick, WA)
10. 1994 – Sherwin-Williams Classic (Bedford, OH)
11. 1995 – Showboat Invitational (Las Vegas, NV)
12. 1995 – **BPAA U.S. Open** (Detroit, MI)
13. 1996 – **BPAA U.S. Open** (Indianapolis, IN)
14. 2000 – NBS National/Senior Doubles (w/Pete Couture) (Reno, NV)
