= Danny Wiseman =

American ten-pin bowler

Personal information
- Born: September 24, 1967 (age 59)

Bowling Information
- Affiliation: PBA
- Rookie year: 1987
- Dominant hand: Right
- Wins: 12 PBA Tour (1 major); 1 PBA50 Tour; 12 PBA Regional Tour
- 300-games: 44

Daniel Albert Wiseman (born September 24, 1967) is a right-handed professional ten-pin bowler who won 12 national PBA Tour titles as a member of the Professional Bowlers Association (PBA), in addition to one PBA50 Tour title. He is a member of both the PBA and USBC Halls of Fame.

Wiseman is a resident of Baltimore, Maryland, USA.

== PBA career ==
Wiseman joined the PBA in 1987, and won two titles in his first full season on the PBA Tour (1990), including a win in his TV debut that took place in his home town of Baltimore. He also won multiple titles in 1991 and 1995, on his way to 12 titles overall. His best professional season was in 2004-05, when he cashed in all 21 events that he entered, made match play a career-high 18 times, won his only major title at 2004 Miller High Life ABC Masters, and earned a career-best $186,050. The final round of the 2004 Masters was held at Miller Park, home of Major League Baseball's Milwaukee Brewers, where Wiseman won in front of over 4,000 fans. He also finished runner-up in two other majors: the 1997 Touring Players Championship and the 2009 USBC Masters.

Wiseman won more than $1.6 million in his PBA career (TV bonuses, Pro staff salary and incentives not included). He has 45 career top-five finishes on the PBA Tour and competed in the title match 18 times, going 12–6 in those matches. He has thrown 44 career perfect 300 games in PBA competition (through 2019). He also has 31 USBC 300 games for a total of 75 perfect games.

Wiseman was an exempt player for the 2010-11 PBA season. He bowled in only six events of the 2009-10 season, but was granted a hardship exemption deferment due to him having to care for his ailing mother. His mother recovered from the sub-arachnid hemorrhage (brain bleed). Danny did not win a title in 2010-11, but earned enough points to retain his exemption for the 2011-12 season. The PBA Tour returned to an "open" (non-exempt) format for the 2012-13 season, but by then Wiseman had chosen to only participate part-time. In 2013-14, Danny participated in only a few PBA regional events before a serious tendon tear in his right wrist had to be addressed. He had surgery in April 2015 to repair the torn tendon, and continued rehab the rest of the season.

Wiseman was ranked #42 on the PBA's 2008 list of "50 Greatest Players of the Last 50 Years". He was voted into the PBA Hall of Fame in January, 2013, and was officially inducted on March 30, 2013 (along with Doug Kent). Later in 2013, Danny was elected to the Maryland State Athletic Hall of Fame (induction November 14). He was the first tenpin bowler to ever be honored by that organization. Danny is also a member of the Greater Maryland State USBC and Greater Baltimore USBC Halls of fame being inducted into these in 2009. In 2014 Danny was also inducted into the local Dundalk Sports Hall of Fame. In April, 2018, Wiseman was inducted into the National USBC Hall of Fame in the Superior Performance category, marking his sixth Hall of Fame induction.

On December 17, 2020, Wiseman was announced as the winner of the 2020 PBA Tony Reyes Community Service Award for his work promoting youth bowling. Since 2012, Wiseman has run an annual Danny Wiseman Youth Scholarship tournament which has awarded over $190,000 in scholarship grants.

Wiseman is a part-time bowler on the PBA50 Tour. On April 16, 2026, Wiseman won the PBA50 The Villages Classic for his first PBA50 title.

=== PBA Tour titles ===
Major titles in bold type.

1. 1990 Fair Lanes Open (Baltimore, MD)
2. 1990 Kessler Classic (Dublin, CA)
3. 1991 Seattle Open (Seattle, WA)
4. 1991 Toyota Classic (Richmond Heights, MO)
5. 1995 Splitfire Spark Plug Open (Erie, PA)
6. 1995 Great Lakes Open (Grand Rapids, MI)
7. 1998 PBA Oregon Open (Portland, OR)
8. 2000 Columbia 300 Open (Austin, TX)
9. 2001–02 Johnny Petraglia Open (North Brunswick, NJ)
10. 2002–03 Miller High Life Open (Vernon Hills, IL)
11. **2004–05 Miller High Life ABC Masters** (Milwaukee, WI)
12. 2007–08 PBA Exempt Doubles Classic w/Mike Fagan (Las Vegas, NV)

=== PBA50 Tour titles ===
1. 2026 PBA50 The Villages Classic (The Villages, FL)

=== PBA Regional Titles ===
1. 1989 Phillipsburg NJ
2. 1989 Brooklyn NY
3. 1995 Franklin VA
4. 1998 Indianapolis IN
5. 2000 West Caldwell NJ
6. 2000 Seaford DE
7. 2010 Forest Hill MD
8. 2010 Middletown DE
9. 2011 Lebanon PA
10. 2012 Turnersville NJ
11. 2012 Howell NJ
12. 2013 Middletown DE (Appletree Classic)

=== Awards and honors ===
- PBA Tony Reyes Community Service Award winner (2020)
- USBC Hall of Fame (2018)
- Professional Bowlers Association Hall Of Fame (2013)
- Maryland State Athletic Hall of Fame (2013)
- Member of the Maryland State USBC Hall of Fame (2009)
- Member of the Greater Baltimore Bowling Association Hall of Fame (2009)
- Voted 42nd greatest player of the PBA's first 50 years by the PBA and bowling media (2008)
- Elected to the Bowlers Journal All-American Team in 1990, 1991, 1996, 1999, 2002–03, 2004–05
- Elected to Bowling Digest Magazine All-American Team 2002-03, 2004–05
- Elected to the USBC All American Team in 2000, 2004
- Selected as the 1986-87 & 1987–88 Baltimore Metro Bowler of the Year
- Selected to the 1986–87 & 1987-88 Baltimore All Metro Team

Maryland State USBC Championship Titles:

- 1988 Team Scratch
- 1989 Singles Scratch
- 2011 Singles Scratch

Greater Baltimore USBC Bowling Association Titles:

- 1989 Team Scratch
- 1999 All Events Scratch
- 1999 Doubles Handicap
- 1999 Singles Scratch

Baltimore 700 Club Titles: 5

== Personal ==
Wiseman started his own signature line of bowling and casual shirts called DWGEAR Clothing found on his website. He is a fan of IRL, NASCAR and NHRA and Formula One auto racing, as well as heavy metal and alternative music. Wiseman also hosts an annual Youth Scholarship Tournament each October, from which over $190,000 was distributed in its first 8 years to youth bowlers for their further education. Youth bowlers have traveled from nine states to participate in this event.

In August 1998, Wiseman underwent laser eye surgery to mitigate his vision issues. He saw this as a personal benefit as he didn't have to wear glasses or contacts afterwards.

A fan of the Baltimore Orioles, Wiseman was in the stands and caught Adam Jones' game-winning home run ball in the 11th inning of opening day, 2018. On June 30, 2018, the two met in person for an exchange. Wiseman had Jones sign the baseball, and gave Jones a signed bowling ball in return.

Wiseman has also worked with Jeff Gordon (NASCAR), Ray Lewis (Baltimore Ravens), and other sports stars on their bowling charity events through the years.
