= David Ozio =

Retired right-handed ten-pin bowler

David Ozio (born April 3, 1954) of Beaumont, Texas is a retired right-handed ten-pin bowler and member of the Professional Bowlers Association (PBA). He won 11 titles on the PBA Tour, including one major championship, and was the 1991 PBA Player of the Year. He was the 2004 Senior PBA Rookie of the Year, and has won five titles on the Senior and Generations tours. Ozio is a member of both the PBA and USBC Halls of Fame.

== PBA career ==
Ozio had a slow start on the PBA Tour, first joining in 1978. After devastating heartbreak following the loss of his first wife Sharon during childbirth in 1981, he won his first title in 1985, and would win a second later that season. After amassing six titles by 1990, he started 1991 with titles in the season's first two events. He then won his only career major on the regular PBA Tour later that season at the 1991 Firestone Tournament of Champions, when he was living in nearby Vidor, Texas. The televised finals for this Tournament of Champions was delayed 40 minutes due to a bomb threat, which turned out to be a hoax. After winning a fourth title later that season, Ozio was named 1991 PBA Player of the Year. He was inducted into the PBA Hall of Fame in 1995. He was ranked #34 on the PBA's 2008 list of "50 Greatest Players of the last 50 years."

Ozio's 11th and final PBA Tour win was on October 28 – November 1, 1995 in the AMF Dick Weber Classic at the Arthur Ashe Center in Richmond, Virginia, where he broke the TV record for four-game pinfall with 1,070 pins, topping the mark of 1,050 set in 1984 by Nelson Burton Jr. The record would stand only one year, however, as it was shattered by Bob Learn Jr.'s 1,129 four-game total in an April 6, 1996 Erie, Pennsylvania event.

Ozio spent some time on the PBA Senior Tour (now PBA50 Tour), winning two events including the 2004 Senior U.S. Open, before being slowed by a wrist injury. He retired from professional bowling after the 2008 Senior season, having decided he wasn't as competitive as he wanted to be.

22 years after his PBA Hall of Fame induction, Ozio was voted into the USBC Hall of Fame in January 2017, and was inducted with the 2017 class on April 26.

=== PBA Tour titles ===
Major championships in bold.

1. 1985 AMF Angle Open (Florissant, Missouri)
2. 1985 Tucson Open (Tucson, Arizona)
3. 1986 Lite Beer Classic (Miami, Florida)
4. 1988 Hammer Open (Edmond, Oklahoma)
5. 1989 Milwaukee Classic (Milwaukee, Wisconsin)
6. 1990 Showboat Doubles Classic w/Steve Wunderlich (Las Vegas, Nevada)
7. 1991 AC-Delco Classic (Torrance, California)
8. 1991 Showboat Invitational (Las Vegas, Nevada)
9. **1991 Firestone Tournament of Champions** (Fairlawn, Ohio)
10. 1991 Chevy Truck Classic (Rochester, New York)
11. 1995 AMF Dick Weber Classic (Richmond, Virginia)

== In the media ==
- Ozio authored an instructional book (with Dan Herbst) in 1992 called Bowl Like a Pro.
- Bowlers Journal International editor Gianmarc Manzione interviewed Ozio, along with fellow pro-bowlers DJ Archer, Steve Wunderlich, Pete McCordic, Paul McCordic, and Mark Williams, among others, about surviving Hurricane Harvey in 2017.
