= PBA Tournament of Champions =

Professional bowling invitational

The PBA Tournament of Champions is one of the five major PBA (Professional Bowlers Association) bowling events. It is an invitational event and the only PBA Tour major that does not have any open field. All participants must meet qualifications to be invited.

== History ==
The inaugural event, held by the PBA in 1962, featured all 25 PBA Tour title-holders to date, and was won by PBA Hall of Famer Joe Joseph, who had qualified for the tournament only four events prior. In 1965, the tournament featured all champions since the 1962 event, before officially becoming an annual event in 1966 (at that time featuring the most recent 48 tour champions).

From 1965 to 1993, Firestone Tire sponsored the Tournament of Champions. Since 1994, the Tournament of Champions has had a variety of sponsors, including General Tire, Brunswick, Dexter, H&R Block, Barbasol, Fire Lake Casino & Resort, and most recently Kia.

From 1965 until 1994, the tournament was contested at Riviera Lanes (now AMF Riviera Lanes) in Fairlawn, Ohio near the long-time Firestone World Headquarters in Akron, Ohio. From 2002 to 2007, the Tournament of Champions was contested in an arena setting at Mohegan Sun Arena, in Uncasville, Connecticut. The event was moved to Las Vegas, Nevada for the 2007–08 season, and was contested there through the 2011–12 season. The tournament returned to Riviera Lanes again in 2018.

The TOC is the only PBA major that is an "invitational" event. Prior to 2007–08, a bowler qualified for the Tournament of Champions by being one of the 32 most recent title winners on the regular PBA Tour. The list was expanded in 2008 to include some past winners of the TOC itself, even if they were no longer in the Top 32 most recent PBA winners. The 2009–10 TOC saw its first-ever female competitor, as a spot in the 2010 tournament was given to Kelly Kulick, winner of the inaugural PBA Women's World Championship in 2009. Kulick made sports history on January 24, 2010 as she defeated Mika Koivuniemi and Chris Barnes to become the first woman to win a title against men on the PBA Tour.

In the 2011 and 2012 Tournament of Champions, the tournament allowed PBA Regional Tour winners for the first time, even if they had no titles on the PBA Tour, as long as they were PBA members at the time of their Regional title. These players participated in the initial "Champions" field qualifying to gain a spot in the "Elite" field. After 20 games of qualifying, a limited number of Champions field players earned entry into the Elite Field, which consisted of 54 bowlers total (a combination of past PBA Tour champions, top players in Champions field qualifying, plus the previous year's TOC champion). All Elite field players cashed a minimum of $2,500. After 16 more games in the Cashers' Round, the Top 24 (based on 36 total games) made the round-robin match play. The Top 4 match play qualifiers then made the live televised finals. Payouts for the TV finals were $250,000 for first, $100,000 for second, $50,000 for third and $40,000 for fourth. (See also: PBA Bowling Tour: 2010–11 season.) This format was retained for the 2011–12 season, albeit with reduced prize money.

For the 2018 season, the TOC format changed again. With a maximum starting field of 80, up to 70 spots are automatically given to entrants with a National PBA Tour title. If the number of entrants tops 70, the list is cut to the most recent title winners, although past winners of the TOC itself retain their automatic entry regardless of when the win occurred. Winners of a PBA Regional, PBA50 Tour, PBA50 Regional or PBA Women's Series title must bowl in an 8-game Pre Tournament Qualifier (PTQ) to earn one of the remaining spots in the opening field. A minimum of 10 spots are filled from the PTQ, but additional spots are made available if the number of automatic entrants is fewer than 70. In 2018, Matt O'Grady became the first player out of the PTQ (with no national PBA Tour titles) to win the Tournament of Champions.

== Notable editions ==
In a notable opening match at the 1967 Tournament of Champions finals, Jack Biondolillo rolled the first-ever nationally televised 300 game. Biondolillo would only tally a 188 score in his next match (a victory), before being eliminated in his third match with a 172 score. Biondolillo's feat was not matched until 2015, when Sean Rash rolled the TOC's second televised perfect game in the second match of the stepladder finals. The tournament has also seen a pair of televised 299 games, by Don Johnson (1970) and Mika Koivuniemi (2011). The 2011 event also featured the lowest-ever game bowled in a nationally televised PBA event as well as the largest pin differential in a PBA match, when Koivuniemi defeated Tom Daugherty in the semifinals, 299–100.

The TOC is the only PBA major that all-time titles leader Walter Ray Williams Jr. has never won.

The 2010–11 Tournament of Champions took place January 16–22, 2011, and featured a $1 million purse and $250,000 first prize, making it the richest PBA tournament ever. The tournament had an all-new format that included a "Champions Field" and an "Elite Field." The Champions Field (maximum of 180 bowlers) included any past PBA champions with four or fewer titles, plus titlists on the PBA Regional Tour, PBA Women's Series tour, PBA Senior Tour and PBA Senior Regional Tour who were PBA members at the time of the titles. The Top 90 finishers after 14 qualifying games advanced to bowl against the Elite Field. The Elite Field included all 2010–11 exempt PBA players, any PBA Hall of Famer, any player listed in 2008 as one of the "50 Greatest PBA Players of the Last 50 Years," any PBA player with five or more PBA Tour titles or at least one PBA major title, plus the winners of the 2010 USBC Senior Masters, 2010 PBA Senior U.S. Open, 2010 Regional Players Invitational and 2010 Regional Players Championship. All entrants had to be full-fledged PBA members as of October 1, 2010.

== Tournament Winners ==
=== 2026 Event ===
The 2026 PBA Tournament of Champions was held April 22–26 at Riviera Lanes in Fairlawn, Ohio, with a pre-tournament qualifier (PTQ) on April 21. The starting field of 72 players included 60 past PBA Tour champions and 12 PBA Regional Tour champions who were added out of the PTQ. The total prize fund was $400,000, with the top 32 players cashing and $100,000 going to the winner. A five-player stepladder format was used for the finals. Second-seeded Alex Horton, one of the 12 Regional champions to come out of the PTQ, defeated top seed Zach Wilkins (who had qualified for the main field just the week before with his first national PBA Tour title), 224–176, to earn his first PBA Tour title and first major championship.

Match #1
4	Brandon Bonta	213
5	Jason Belmonte	247

Match #2
3	Andrew Anderson	236
5	Jason Belmonte	163

Match #3
2	Alex Horton	223
3	Andrew Anderson	212

Title Match
1	Zach Wilkins	176
2	Alex Horton	224

Prize Pool:

1. Alex Horton (Douglassville, Pennsylvania) – $100,000
2. Zach Wilkins (Barrie, Ontario, Canada) – $50,000
3. Andrew Anderson (Holly, Michigan) – $30,000
4. Jason Belmonte (Orange, New South Wales, Australia) – $25,000
5. Brandon Bonta (Wichita, Kansas) – $20,000

=== Past winners ===
Year	Winner	Runner-up	Championship match score
1962	Joe Joseph	Billy Golembiewski	480–416
1965	Billy Hardwick	Dick Weber	484–468
1966	Wayne Zahn	Dick Weber (2)	203–170
1967	Jim Stefanich	Don Johnson	227–227 (48–36 roll-off)
1968	Dave Davis	Don Johnson (2)	213–205
1969	Jim Godman	Jim Stefanich	266–228
1970	Don Johnson	Dick Ritger	299–268
1971	Johnny Petraglia	Don Johnson (3)	246–169
1972	Mike Durbin	Timmy Harahan	258–187
1973	Jim Godman (2)	Barry Asher	224–200
1974	Earl Anthony	Johnny Petraglia	216–213
1975	Dave Davis (2)	Barry Asher (2)	201–195
1976	Marshall Holman	Billy Hardwick	203–198
1977	Mike Berlin	Mike Durbin	221–205
1978	Earl Anthony (2)	Teata Semiz	237–192
1979	George Pappas	Dick Ritger (2)	224–195
1980	Wayne Webb	Gary Dickinson	219–194
1981	Steve Cook	Pete Couture	287–183
1982	Mike Durbin (2)	Steve Cook	233–203
1983	Joe Berardi	Henry Gonzalez	186–179
1984	Mike Durbin (3)	Mike Aulby	246–163
1985	Mark Williams	Bob Handley	191–140
1986	Marshall Holman (2)	Mark Baker	233–211
1987	Pete Weber	Jim Murtishaw	222–190
1988	Mark Williams (2)	Tony Westlake	237–214
1989	Del Ballard Jr.	Walter Ray Williams Jr.	254–218
1990	Dave Ferraro	Tony Westlake (2)	226–203
1991	David Ozio	Amleto Monacelli	236–203
1992	Marc McDowell	Don Genalo	223–193
1993	George Branham III	Parker Bohn III	227–214
1994	Norm Duke	Eric Forkel	217–194
1995	Mike Aulby	Bob Spaulding	237–232
1996	Dave D'Entremont	Dave Arnold	215–202
1997	John Gant	Mike Aulby (2)	208–187
1998	Bryan Goebel	Steve Hoskins	245–235
1999	Jason Couch	Chris Barnes	197–193
2000	Jason Couch (2)	Ryan Shafer	198–166
2001	Tournament not held in 2001		
2002	Jason Couch (3)	Ryan Shafer (2)	266–224
2003	Patrick Healey, Jr	Randy Pedersen	222–188
2004	Tournament not held in 2004		
2005	Steve Jaros	Norm Duke	248–242
2006	Chris Barnes	Steve Jaros	234–227
2007	Tommy Jones	Tony Reyes	257–222
2008	Michael Haugen Jr.	Chris Barnes (2)	215–214
2009	Patrick Allen	Rhino Page	267–263
2010	Kelly Kulick	Chris Barnes (3)	265–195
2011	Mika Koivuniemi	Tom Smallwood	269–207
2012	Sean Rash	Ryan Ciminelli	239–205
2013	Pete Weber (2)	Jason Belmonte	224–179
2014	Jason Belmonte	Wes Malott	219–218
2015	Jason Belmonte (2)	Rhino Page (2)	232–214
2016	Jesper Svensson	Mitch Beasley	226–177
2017	E. J. Tackett	Tommy Jones	208–203
2018	Matt O'Grady	Jesper Svensson	207–193
2019	Jason Belmonte (3)	E. J. Tackett	225–196
2020	Kristopher Prather	Bill O'Neill	280–205
2021	François Lavoie	Anthony Simonsen	233–187
2022	Dominic Barrett	Kristopher Prather	210–189
2023	Jason Belmonte (4)	E. J. Tackett (2)	246–179
2024	Marshall Kent	Anthony Simonsen (2)	205–201
2025	Jesper Svensson (2)	Jakob Butturff	221–197
2026	Alex Horton	Zach Wilkins	224–176

== Jason Thomas' "Top 10 Moments in T of C History" ==
In 2010, PBA.com writer Jason Thomas listed his Top 10 moments in the 48-year history of the Tournament of Champions.

#10 - Marshall Holman's Million-Dollar Win. Hall of Famer Marshall Holman became the third player in PBA history to top the $1 million mark in career earnings by winning the 1986 event.

#9 - George Branham III Wins Last Firestone. In 1993, George Branham III became the first (and only until Alex Horton in 2026) African American winner in this tournament, as well as the last to win the tournament while it was sponsored by Firestone.

#8 - Weber Becomes Youngest to 10 Titles. With his win in the 1987 T of C, 24-year-old Pete Weber became the youngest PBA player ever to reach the 10-title plateau.

#7 - Earl Gets Title #30. Hall of Fame left-hander Earl Anthony became the first PBA player to reach 30 career titles with his win in the 1978 event. The legendary Dick Weber, who was in the ABC broadcast booth with Chris Schenkel because analyst Nelson Burton Jr. had made the TV finals, proclaimed Anthony the "undisputed King of Bowling" after the victory.

#6 - Bomb Scare. In 1991, the tournament was delayed 40 minutes due to a bomb threat, which turned out to be a hoax. David Ozio eventually won the title on his way to 1991 Player of the Year honors.

#5 - Rhino's 4-Count. Rhino Page, needing a 9-spare to defeat Patrick Allen after striking on the first ball in the 10th frame in the 2009 event, left an inexplicable 4-count. Missing wide left of target, Page's shot cut right between the 1 and 4 pins, leaving a bizarre 1-3-4-7-9-10 washout. Though he made the spare, he lost to Allen, 267-263.

#4 - Michael Haugen Jr.'s Comeback. Having just qualified for the 2008 T of C earlier that season, Michael Haugen Jr. trailed Chris Barnes by 53 pins in the 5th frame of the final match, and was still down 41 pins entering the 9th frame. When Barnes missed a 10-pin in the 9th frame, Haugen responded with a strike in the 9th and two strikes plus nine pins in the 10th. Barnes rolled a spare in the 10th, and needed a strike on the fill ball to force extra frames. But Barnes left a 4-pin, giving Haugen a narrow 215-214 victory.

#3 - Couch's Three-Peat. In 2002, Jason Couch became just the second PBA Player to win the T of C three times (joining Mike Durbin) and the only one to do so in consecutive seasons.

#2 - Don Johnson's 299 Game. In perhaps the most iconic moment of the PBA's first 50 years, Hall of Famer Don Johnson had struck on the first nine balls of the final 1970 T of C match, but still needed a mark in the 10th frame to top Dick Ritger's 268 score. Johnson rolled the first two strikes in the 10th to lock up the title. With an additional $10,000 and a Mercury Cougar automobile on the line for a 300-game, Johnson packed his 12th shot but left a ringing 10-pin for a 299 game. The shot of Johnson lying face-down on the approach in disbelief has been replayed dozens of times on PBA telecasts. The Tournament of Champions now uses the "Don Johnson 40" (40-foot) oil pattern in honor of this feat.

#1 - Kelly Kulick became the first woman to win a national PBA Tour event at the 2010 Tournament of Champions. After qualifying for the telecast in second place on Friday, Kulick defeated Mika Koivuniemi and Chris Barnes on Sunday, finishing with a 265 game in the final. The telecast was the PBA's highest-rated show for the year.

== 50th Anniversary "Top Moments" Fan Voting ==
To commemorate the 50th Tournament of Champions in 2015, a fan poll was conducted to name their top moment in the tournament's history. The top five vote earners included some historic moments that have occurred since Thomas' list was published:

1. Kelly Kulick's win in 2010. (27%)

2. Pete Weber's 2X Triple Crown Win. (16%) Pete Weber's victory in the 2013 event made him the oldest player (50) to win the T of C, as well as the only player to win each event of the PBA's Triple Crown at least twice in a career.

3. Mika Koivuniemi Cashes a Record Winner's Share. (13%) The 2011 Tournament of Champions featured a $1 million purse and a $250,000 first prize (won by Mika Koivuniemi), making it the richest PBA tournament ever. Koivuniemi also won the most lopsided match in PBA finals history, defeating Tom Daugherty 299-100 in the semifinals.

T4. Don Johnson's 299 game in the 1970 final match. (8%)

T4. Jason Couch's three-peat win in 2002. (8%)

== Sources ==
- PBA.com site
