= Round1 Japan Cup =

Annual bowling event between the American and Japanese professional bowling associations

ROUND1 Japan Cup is an annual PBA (Professional Bowlers Association) and JPBA (Japan Professional Bowling Association) bowling event sponsored by ROUND1. In its earlier years, the tournament typically featured the top 16 bowlers from each organization, but has recently enjoyed an expanded field. It has been dominated by PBA Tour professionals since 1989. Until Yuya Katoh's win in 2013, the last JPBA bowler to win the event was Takeo Sakai in 1988.

The tournament celebrated its 25th anniversary in 2010. The 2010 Dydo Japan Cup featured a starting field of 144 bowlers, which included JPBA members from Japan and South Korea, PBA members, and Japanese amateurs.

The event was not held in 2011, due in large part to the earthquake and resulting tsunami in Japan.

The 2013 edition of the Japan Cup was held from November 28 through December 1, 2013. The top 16 PBA Tour players (based on 2012-13 competition points), plus a handful of at-large PBA Tour invitees, joined a large field of players from Japan and South Korea.

== 2019 Results ==
=== TV Finals ===
==== Finals ====
- Match 1: Chris Barnes (United States) def. Dom Barrett (United Kingdom) 253-222
- Match 2: Jason Belmonte (Australia) def. Chris Barnes (United States) 245-220
- Match 3: Jason Belmonte (Australia) def. Takuya Miyazawa (Japan) 227-189
- Match 4: Jason Belmonte (Australia) def. Jakob Butturff (United States) 224-213

=== Final standings ===
- 1st Place - Jason Belmonte, (Australia) (US$44,650)
- 2nd Place - Jakob Butturff, (United States) (US$22,330)
- 3rd Place - Takuya Miyazawa, (Japan) (US$11,150)
- 4th Place - Chris Barnes, (United States) (US$8,900)
- 5th Place - Dom Barret, (United Kingdom) (US$7,100)

== Winners ==
- 1985 Ken Taniguchi (Japan)
- 1986 Pete Weber (United States)
- 1987 Amleto Monacelli (Venezuela)
- 1988 Takeo Sakai (Japan)
- 1989 Randy Pedersen (United States)
- 1990 Chris Warren (United States)
- 1991 Walter Ray Williams, Jr. (United States)
- 1992 Parker Bohn III (United States)
- 1993 Pete Weber (2) (United States)
- 1994 Brian Voss (United States)
- 1995 Amleto Monacelli (2) (Venezuela)
- 1996 Steve Wilson (United States)
- 1997 Doug Kent (United States)
- 1998 Parker Bohn III (2)(United States)
- 1999 Parker Bohn III (3) (United States)
- 2000 Parker Bohn III (4)(United States)
- 2001 Bob Learn, Jr. (United States)
- 2002 Robert Smith (United States)
- 2003 Chris Barnes (United States)
- 2004 Tommy Jones (United States)
- 2005 Tommy Jones (2) (United States)
- 2006 Walter Ray Williams, Jr. (2) (United States)
- 2007 Mika Koivuniemi (Finland)
- 2009 Patrick Allen (United States)
- 2010 Tommy Jones (3) (United States)
- 2012 Mika Koivuniemi (2) (Finland)
- 2013 Yuya Katoh (Japan)
- 2014 Park Kyung Shin (South Korea)
- 2015 Chris Barnes (2) (United States)
- 2016 Amleto Monacelli (3) (Venezuela)
- 2017 E. J. Tackett (United States)
- 2018 Dominic Barrett (England)
- 2019 Jason Belmonte (Australia)
