= Fairlawn, Ohio =

- City
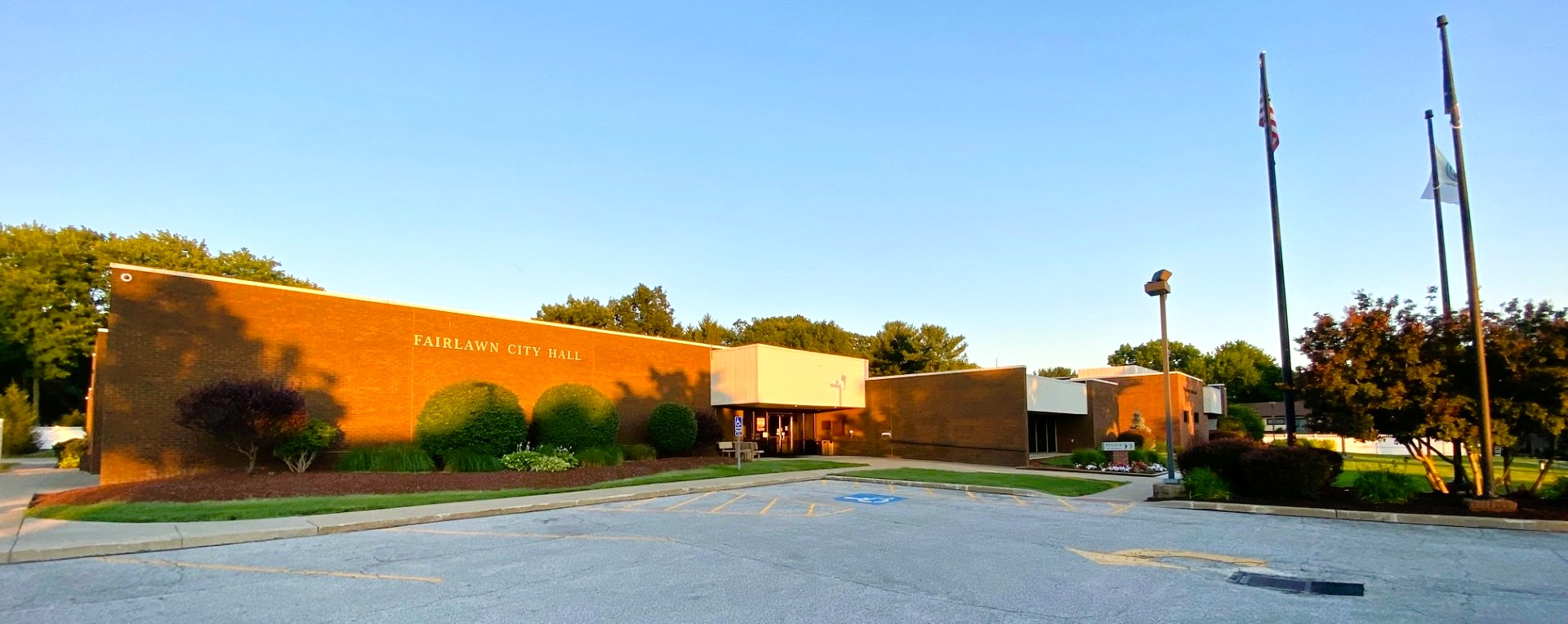
- Fairlawn City Hall

- Flag Seal
- Interactive map of Fairlawn, Ohio
- Location within Ohio Location within the United States
- Coordinates: 41°07′36″N 81°37′20″W
- Country: United States
- State: Ohio
- County: Summit

Area
  - Total: 4.58 sq mi (11.85 km^{2})
  - Land: 4.56 sq mi (11.82 km^{2})
  - Water: 0.012 sq mi (0.03 km^{2})
- Elevation: 1,030 ft (310 m)

Population (2020)
  - Total: 7,710
  - Estimate (2023): 7,682
  - Density: 1,689.1/sq mi (652.15/km^{2})
- Time zone: UTC-5 (Eastern (EST))
  - Summer (DST): UTC-4 (EDT)
- ZIP codes: 44313, 44333, 44334, 44398
- Area codes: 330, 234
- FIPS code: 39-26166
- GNIS feature ID: 2394734
- Website: cityoffairlawn.com

Fairlawn is a city in western Summit County, Ohio, United States, and a suburb of Akron. The population was 7,710 at the 2020 census. It is part of the Akron metropolitan area.

== History ==
Fairlawn was incorporated as Fairlawn Village in 1960. It became a city when its population reached 6,200 in the 1970 census.

== Geography ==
According to the United States Census Bureau, the city has a total area of 4.49 square miles (11.63 km^{2}), of which 4.48 square miles (11.60 km^{2}) is land and 0.01 square miles (0.03 km^{2}) is water.

== Demographics ==
Historical population
Census	Pop.	Note	%±
1970	6,102		—
1980	6,100		0.0%
1990	5,779		−5.3%
2000	7,307		26.4%
2010	7,437		1.8%
2020	7,710		3.7%
2023 (est.)	7,682		−0.4%

=== 2020 census ===
As of the 2020 census, Fairlawn had a population of 7,710. The median age was 48.2 years. 17.4% of residents were under the age of 18, and 27.0% were 65 years of age or older. For every 100 females, there were 85.7 males, and for every 100 females age 18 and over there were 82.8 males age 18 and over.

100.0% of residents lived in urban areas, while 0.0% lived in rural areas.

There were 3,366 households in Fairlawn, of which 23.2% had children under the age of 18 living in them. Of all households, 44.9% were married-couple households, 17.6% were households with a male householder and no spouse or partner present, and 32.4% were households with a female householder and no spouse or partner present. About 35.9% of all households were made up of individuals, and 17.2% had someone living alone who was 65 years of age or older.

There were 3,533 housing units, of which 4.7% were vacant. The homeowner vacancy rate was 1.3% and the rental vacancy rate was 4.7%.

Racial composition as of the 2020 census
Race	Number	Percent
White	5,974	77.5%
Black or African American	905	11.7%
American Indian and Alaska Native	11	0.1%
Asian	315	4.1%
Native Hawaiian and Other Pacific Islander	0	0.0%
Some other race	80	1.0%
Two or more races	425	5.5%
Hispanic or Latino (of any race)	237	3.1%

=== 2010 census ===
As of the census of 2010, there were 7,437 people, 3,219 households, and 1,978 families living in the city. The population density was 1,660.0 inhabitants per square mile (640.9/km^{2}). There were 3,455 housing units at an average density of 771.2 per square mile (297.8/km^{2}). The racial makeup of the city was 82.1% White, 11.0% African American, 4.3% Asian, 0.5% from other races, and 2.0% from two or more races. Hispanic or Latino of any race were 2.3% of the population.

There were 3,219 households, of which 25.1% had children under the age of 18 living with them, 46.8% were married couples living together, 10.6% had a female householder with no husband present, 4.0% had a male householder with no wife present, and 38.6% were non-families. 34.2% of all households were made up of individuals, and 16.7% had someone living alone who was 65 years of age or older. The average household size was 2.20 and the average family size was 2.82.

The median age in the city was 46.8 years. 19.4% of residents were under the age of 18; 5.7% were between the ages of 18 and 24; 22.3% were from 25 to 44; 29.2% were from 45 to 64; and 23.4% were 65 years of age or older. The gender makeup of the city was 47.1% male and 52.9% female.

Of the city's population over the age of 25, 51.1% hold a bachelor's degree or higher.

=== 2000 census ===
As of the census of 2000, there were 7,307 people, 2,986 households, and 1,976 families living in the city. The population density was 1,649.7 inhabitants per square mile (637.0/km^{2}). There were 3,141 housing units at an average density of 709.1 per square mile (273.8/km^{2}). The racial makeup of the city was 88.81% White, 6.12% African American, 0.07% Native American, 3.30% Asian, 0.01% Pacific Islander, 0.44% from other races, and 1.26% from two or more races. Hispanic or Latino of any race were 1.08% of the population.

There were 2,986 households, out of which 27.0% had children under the age of 18 living with them, 56.2% were married couples living together, 8.1% had a female householder with no husband present, and 33.8% were non-families. 29.2% of all households were made up of individuals, and 12.1% had someone living alone who was 65 years of age or older. The average household size was 2.30 and the average family size was 2.85.

In the city the population was spread out, with 20.3% under the age of 18, 5.4% from 18 to 24, 26.0% from 25 to 44, 24.5% from 45 to 64, and 23.8% who were 65 years of age or older. The median age was 44 years. For every 100 females, there were 83.9 males. For every 100 females age 18 and over, there were 82.0 males.

The median income for a household in the city was $62,180, and the median income for a family was $78,947. Males had a median income of $56,303 versus $35,136 for females. The per capita income for the city was $34,927. About 0.6% of families and 1.5% of the population were below the poverty line, including 1.2% of those under age 18 and 1.5% of those age 65 or over.
