= Brian Voss =

American professional ten-pin bowler (born 1958)

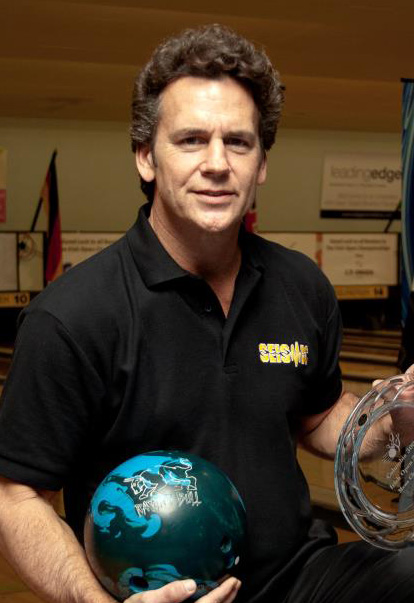
- Voss with his first place trophy at the 2012 Irish Open Championships

Personal information
- Born: August 4, 1958 (age 68) Cornelius, North Carolina, U.S.
- Occupation: Ten-pin bowler
- Years active: 1982–present
- Height: 179 cm (5 ft 10 in)

Sport
- Country: United States
- Sport: Ten-pin bowling
- League: PBA, NHPA World Tournament, PBA50 Tour
- Turned pro: 1982

Brian Voss (born August 4, 1958) in Cornelius, North Carolina, is a professional ten-pin bowler and member of the Professional Bowlers Association since 1982 at aged 24. The right-hander owns 25 PBA Tour titles (12th all-time), including one major championship, plus two titles on the PBA50 Tour and one PBA60 event title. He was inducted into the PBA Hall of Fame in 1994 and the USBC Hall of Fame in 2007.

== Early years ==
Born August 4, 1958, Brian Voss grew up in Anchorage, Alaska (USA), where his father took ownership of a bowling center when Brian was 6. As he said in a 2002 interview, "Bowling has been part of my life for as long as I can remember." After his family moved to Colorado, Voss struggled to pay for college while working at a bowling center, before deciding to enlist in the U.S. Army. He served two years as an Army electronics technician in the Seattle, WA area, where he also had the opportunity to participate in intramural bowling and refine his game while winning multiple All-Army championships.

== PBA career ==
Voss won his first PBA tour title in the 1983 Greater Detroit Open. In the title match, Voss and challenger Pete McCordic tied after the standard 10 frames with an unusually low score of 176. Voss took the championship in a 9th/10th frame roll-off. The 1980s saw him win his only major title, the 1988 PBA National Championship. Also in 1988, he earned a then-record $225,485 and was named PBA Player of the Year.

Voss enjoyed his best career stretch from 1987–1998, winning at least one title in 12 straight seasons. (The PBA record of 17 straight seasons with a title is held by Walter Ray Williams Jr.) It was during this time that two well-known catchphrases caught on: "Don't cross the Voss!" and "Voss is Boss!". Voss suffered a broken wrist at the beginning of the 1999 season, and the streak ended. He has collected over $2.4 million in career PBA earnings.

He was known for exceptional versatility, being able to bowl well on multiple oil patterns. According to pba.com, Voss was "a threat to win any event in which he entered."

Voss lost his PBA Tour exemption following the 2006-07 season, but was reinstated as an exempt player for 2009-10 under the PBA's new "Golden Parachute" rule. In that season, at age 51, Voss won his 25th PBA Tour title—a mixed doubles championship with Diandra Asbaty. With the win, Voss bowled as an exempt player for the 2010-11 PBA Tour season. This made him the oldest exempt player on tour at that time. (Voss turned 52 in August 2010. Exempt player and all-time titles leader Walter Ray Williams Jr. turned 51 in October 2010.)

On August 3, 2016, a day shy of his 58th birthday, Voss won his first PBA50 Tour title at the Dave Small's Championship Lanes Classic in Anderson, Indiana. He won his second PBA50 Tour title on May 2, 2018, at the Mooresville Open in Mooresville, NC.

In August 2018, he turned 60 and won the Dick Weber Classic for PBA60, winning the 60-up tour in his first tournament.

=== PBA Tour titles ===
Major titles in bold type.

1. 1983 Greater Detroit Open (Dearborn Heights, Michigan)
2. 1984 Houston Open (Houston, Texas)
3. 1987 Quaker State Open (Grand Prairie, Texas)
4. 1987 Southern California Open (Riverside, California)
5. **1988 Trustcorp PBA National Championship** (Toledo, Ohio)
6. 1988 True Value Open (Peoria, Illinois)
7. 1989 Bowlers Journal Florida Open (Merritt Island, Florida)
8. 1989 Don Carter’s Greater New Orleans Classic (Harvey, Louisiana)
9. 1990 Budweiser Classic (Sunrise, Florida)
10. 1991 ARC Pinole Open (Pinole, California)
11. 1991 Columbia 300 Open (Austin, Texas)
12. 1992 Paula Carter’s Homestead Classic (Homestead, Florida)
13. 1993 Active West Open (Riverside, California)
14. 1994 Oranamin C Japan Cup (Tokyo, Japan)
15. 1995 Greater Detroit Open (Taylor, Michigan)
16. 1996 Oregon Open (Portland, Oregon)
17. 1997 Northwest Classic (Richland, Washington)
18. 1997 Wichita Open (Wichita, Kansas)
19. 1998 Brunswick Johnny Petraglia Open (North Brunswick, New Jersey)
20. 1998 National Finance Championship (Virginia Beach, Virginia)
21. 2002 PBA Las Vegas Open (Las Vegas, Nevada)
22. 2002 PBA Memphis Open (Memphis, Tennessee)
23. 2004 PBA Storm Orange County Classic (Fountain Valley, California)
24. 2006 Jackson Hewitt Tax Service Classic (Trussville, Alabama)
25. 2010 Bayer Don & Paula Carter Mixed Doubles w/Diandra Asbaty (Wheat Ridge, Colorado)

== Personal ==
Early in his career, Voss developed a reputation because of his poster-boy good looks. In fact, he became a devout family man. Unlike most bowlers, who stay on the road between stops of the grueling PBA tour, Brian routinely flew home to his wife and two sons in the Atlanta area, even if only for a couple of days.

After living for many years in the Atlanta suburbs, Brian moved to Centennial, Colorado. He currently lives in Cornelius, North Carolina, having been given an opportunity to teach bowling in the area.

== Awards and recognition ==
- PBA Player of the Year (1988)
- Harry Smith PBA Points Leader award (1987, 1988)
- Inducted into PBA Hall of Fame, 1994
- Inducted into USBC Hall of Fame, 2007
- Through the end of the 2008-09 season, he had rolled 52 perfect 300 games in PBA events.
- Was ranked #13 on the PBA's 2008 list of "50 Greatest Players of the Last 50 Years"

== Sources ==
- Hall of Fame bios at www.pba.com, official site of the Professional Bowlers Association
- Video of Brian Voss converting the 7-10 split on "PBA Xtra Frame" broadcast on YouTube
- Official website of the Professional Bowlers Association
