= 2002–03 PBA Tour season =

PBA Bowling Tour: 2002–03 Season
- League: Professional Bowlers Association
- Sport: Ten-pin bowling
- Duration: August 30, 2002 – March 9, 2003

PBA Tour
- Season MVP: Walter Ray Williams, Jr.

PBA Tour seasons
- ← 2001–02 2003–04 →

This is a recap of the 2002–03 season for the Professional Bowlers Association (PBA) Tour. It was the tour's 44th season and consisted of 22 events.

Walter Ray Williams, Jr. won his sixth PBA Player of the Year award, tying Earl Anthony for the most all time. He won three titles on the season, including major victories at the 60th U.S. Open and PBA World Championship, while collecting a PBA record $419,700. This record would stand until 2021, when it was surpassed by Kyle Troup.

Bryon Smith won his first PBA title at the ABC Masters. Jason Couch became just the second three-time winner of the Tournament of Champions (joining Mike Durbin), as well as the only player to win three consecutive TOC events.

Eugene McCune's win at the PBA Banquet Classic marked the third time (after Dick & Pete Weber and Don and Jimmy Johnson) that a father-and-son combination had each won PBA titles. Eugene's father is PBA Hall of Famer Don McCune, who won eight titles in his career.

At the GEICO Earl Anthony Classic in Tacoma, Washington, Norm Duke rolled the PBA's 15th televised 300 game.

== Tournament schedule ==
Event	City	Dates	Winner
Dream Bowl 2002	Yokohama, Japan	Aug 30 – Sep 2	Hugh Miller (7)
Oranamin C Japan Cup	Tokyo, Japan	Sep 5–8	Robert Smith (4)
PBA Wichita Open	Wichita, Kansas	Oct 9–13	Dave D'Entremont (6)
Greater Kansas City Classic	Blue Springs, Missouri	Oct 16–20	Patrick Healey Jr. (1)
PBA Memphis Open	Memphis, Tennessee	Oct 23–27	Brian Voss (22)
PBA Miller High Life Open	Vernon Hills, Illinois	Oct 30 – Nov 3	Danny Wiseman (10)
PBA Greater Detroit Open	Taylor, Michigan	Nov 6–10	Walter Ray Williams, Jr. (35)
PBA Banquet Classic	Grand Rapids, Michigan	Nov 13–17	Eugene McCune (1)
Pepsi Open	Springfield Twp., Pennsylvania	Nov 20–24	Randy Pedersen (13)
PBA Cambridge Credit Classic	Syosset, New York	Nov 27 – Dec 1	Norm Duke (20)
PBA Empire State Open	Latham, New York	Dec 4–8	Doug Kent (6)
Tournament of Champions at Mohegan Sun	Uncasville, Connecticut	Dec 12–15	Jason Couch (10)
GEICO Earl Anthony Classic	Tacoma, Washington	Jan 1–5	Mike DeVaney (1)
PBA Medford Open	Medford, Oregon	Jan 8–12	Bryan Goebel (10)
ABC Masters	Reno, Nevada	Jan 14–19	Bryon Smith (1)
Storm Las Vegas Classic	Las Vegas, Nevada	Jan 19–23	Lonnie Waliczek (1)
60th U.S. Open	Fountain Valley, California	Jan 27 – Feb 2	Walter Ray Williams, Jr. (36)
Days Inn Open	Dallas, Texas	Feb 2–9	Chris Barnes (4)
VIA Bowling Open	Orlando, Florida	Feb 12–16	Chris Hayden (1)
PBA Tar Heel Open	Burlington, North Carolina	Feb 19–23	Pete Weber (29)
Odor Eaters Open	Louisville, Kentucky	Feb 26 – Mar 2	Lonnie Waliczek (2)
PBA World Championship	Taylor, Michigan	Mar 3–9	Walter Ray Williams, Jr. (37)
