= 2010–11 PBA Tour season =

PBA Bowling Tour: 2010–11 Season
- League: Professional Bowlers Association
- Sport: Ten-pin bowling
- Duration: October 25, 2010 – March 14, 2011

PBA Tour
- Season MVP: Mika Koivuniemi

PBA Tour seasons
- ← 2009–10 2011–12 →

This is a recap of the 2010–11 season for the Professional Bowlers Association (PBA) Tour. It was the Tour's 52nd season and consisted of 12 title events.

== Tournament schedule and recaps ==
For the second season in a row, the PBA condensed the first half of the season into the PBA World Series of Bowling (WSOB). Preliminary rounds of the televised tournaments were held in October and November, with television tapings on November 5–6. All of the events were held at the South Point Casino's bowling center in Las Vegas, NV. South Point also hosted the live multi-day final for the PBA World Championship on January 14–16, 2011.

The World Series was open to all PBA, Korean Professional Bowlers Association, Japan Professional Bowlers Association, and World Ten-Pin Bowling Association members (except for USA-based WTBA members, who must also join the PBA).

The format for the first of the PBA's four majors, the PBA World Championship, overlapped with the five "oil pattern" championships of the World Series. Each of the five oil pattern championships (Cheetah, Viper, Chameleon, Scorpion, Shark) were both standalone title tournaments and part of the qualifying round for the 2010–11 PBA World Championship. Each oil pattern championship opened with a 12-game qualifying round, and proceeded to its own 16-bowler match play semifinal and five-bowler televised final round. In addition, scores from the 60 total games of oil pattern tournament qualifying were combined to create the eight-bowler final field for the PBA World Championship. The PBA also used the 60-game scores to create a made-for-television exhibition event, U.S.A. vs. the World, taped on November 6 and aired on January 9, 2011. The event featured the top 6 USA qualifiers against the top 6 international qualifiers.

The PBA, for the first time, scheduled three consecutive days of live broadcasts for the PBA World Championship finals, January 14–16, 2011. The format was an 8-bowler stepladder. The 8–7 and 7–6 matches aired Friday night, January 14 on ESPN2; the 6–5 and 5–4 matches aired Saturday night, January 15 on ESPN2; the top four then competed Sunday afternoon, January 16 on ESPN.

The 2011 PBA Tournament of Champions featured an all-new format and a $250,000 first prize, making it the richest PBA tournament in history. The event also marked the return of a PBA tournament to ABC-TV, where the PBA Tour aired from 1962 to 1997.

The 2011 Lumber Liquidators U.S. Open also featured live Friday and Saturday night broadcasts on ESPN2, this time covering the match-play rounds on February 25–26. The 4-person stepladder finals aired live Sunday, February 27 on ESPN.

For the first time in PBA history, the season concluded with a playoff. The qualifying rounds of the Dick Weber PBA Playoffs ran March 8–13, and featured 18 regional qualifiers in each PBA Region (East, Central, South, Southwest, Midwest, combined West/Northwest) plus 72 "seeded" regular touring pros randomly placed in each of the six regions. Two "knockout" rounds (three region finals each) and the "conference finals" were broadcast on a tape-delay basis for three straight Sundays, starting March 27, 2011. The finals, featuring the three conference final winners, were broadcast live on Sunday, April 17.

=== World Series of Bowling (first-half) highlights ===
- Eugene McCune won the season's first tournament (and his second PBA title) at the Brunswick Cheetah Championship. During the 9-game match play round for this tournament, McCune set a PBA record for a 9-game squad with 2,468 pins (274.2 average).
- Yong-Jin Gu became the first Korean to win a U.S. PBA Tour event, when he took the crown in the Scorpion Championship. In an all-South Korean final, he toppled Jun-Yung Kim, 236–224. (Gu was not awarded an official PBA title, because he is not a full-fledged PBA member in either the U.S. or Korea.)
- The World Series concluded with three first-time PBA Tour winners: Scott Norton, Yong-Jin Gu and Osku Palermaa.

=== Second-half highlights ===
- Chris Barnes became just the sixth player in PBA history to earn a career "triple crown" when he won the PBA World Championship on January 16.
- Mika Koivuniemi won the largest first-place prize in PBA Tour history, taking $250,000 and the title in the PBA Tournament of Champions on January 22.
- Tom Hess won his first-ever PBA title at the USBC Masters on February 13.
- Norm Duke won his second U.S. Open title and seventh PBA major overall on February 27, when Mika Koivuniemi missed a 10-pin for an open in the 10th frame of the final match.
- Ritchie Allen, now bowling under the name "Dick Allen," won the inaugural Dick Weber PBA Playoffs for his third PBA title.
- By failing to win a title in the 2010–11 season, Walter Ray Williams Jr.'s PBA-record streak of winning at least one title in 17 consecutive seasons came to an end.

=== 2010–11 Awards ===
- Chris Schenkel Player of the Year: Mika Koivuniemi
- George Young High Average Award: Mika Koivuniemi (222.50)
- Harry Golden Rookie of the Year: Scott Norton
- Steve Nagy Sportsmanship Award: Ryan Shafer

=== Schedule with results ===
Below is a summary of the 2010–11 season. Total career PBA Tour titles for winners are shown in parentheses.

Event	Airdate	City	Preliminary rounds	Final round	Oil pattern	Winner	Notes
Brunswick Cheetah Championship	Nov 28	Las Vegas, NV	Oct 25 & Nov 1	Nov 5	Cheetah	Eugene McCune, USA (2)	WSOB II event.
Pepsi Viper Championship	Dec 5	Las Vegas, NV	Oct 26 & Nov 1	Nov 5	Viper	Bill O'Neill, USA (3)	WSOB II event.
Chameleon Championship	Dec 12	Las Vegas, NV	Oct 27 & Nov 2	Nov 5	Chameleon	Scott Norton, USA (1)	WSOB II event..
Scorpion Championship	Dec 19	Las Vegas, NV	Oct 28 & Nov 2	Nov 6	Scorpion	Yong-Jin Gu, South Korea (NQ)	WSOB II event.
GEICO Shark Championship	Dec 26	Las Vegas, NV	Oct 29 & Nov 3	Nov 6	Shark	Osku Palermaa, Finland (1)	WSOB II event.
U.S.A. vs. the World	Jan 9	Las Vegas, NV	Oct 25–29	Nov 6	Cheetah	World Team, 6–3	Exhibition event; (1-point head-to-head matches tied 3-3, World defeats USA in 3-point team event, 1251–1208.)
PBA World Championship	Jan 14–16	Las Vegas, NV	Oct 25–29	Live	Viper	Chris Barnes, USA (13)	Qualifying rounds took place at WSOB II. No. 1 qualifier chose oil pattern for finals.
PBA Tournament of Champions	Jan 22*	Las Vegas, NV	Jan 16–21	Live	T of C	Mika Koivuniemi, Finland (9)	
One A Day Earl Anthony Memorial Classic	Jan 30	Dublin, CA	Jan 24–29	Live	Earl pattern	Ryan Ciminelli, USA (1)	
Chris Paul PBA Celebrity Invitational	Feb 6	New Orleans, LA	Dec 9–11	Dec 12	Scorpion	Jason Belmonte and Chris Paul	Exhibition event.
Bayer USBC Masters	Feb 13	Reno, NV	Feb 6–12	Live	USBC Masters (custom)	Tom Hess, USA (1)	
Lumber Liquidators 68th U.S. Open	Feb 25–27	North Brunswick, NJ	Feb 21–26	Live	U.S. Open (custom)	Norm Duke, USA (34)	
Mark Roth Plastic Ball Championship	Mar 6	Cheektowaga, NY	Mar 1–5	Live	Modified house	Jason Couch, USA (16)	
Dick Weber PBA Playoffs	Mar 27 (Knockout; Round 1)	Indianapolis, IN	Mar 8–14	Mar 14	Dick Weber	Central – Dick Allen; East – Steve Jaros; South – Randy Weiss	Advanced to Conference Finals
Dick Weber PBA Playoffs	Apr 3 (Knockout; Round 2)	Indianapolis, IN	Mar 8–14	Mar 14	Dick Weber	Midwest – Jack Jurek; Southwest – Jason Belmonte; West/Northwest – Chris Barnes	Advanced to Conference Finals
Dick Weber PBA Playoffs	Apr 10 (Conference; Finals)	Indianapolis, IN	Mar 8–14	Mar 14	Dick Weber	Randy Weiss defeated Steve Jaros; Ritchie Allen defeated Jack Jurek; Chris Barnes defeated Jason Belmonte	Head-to-head matches
Dick Weber PBA Playoffs	Apr 17 (Final Round)	Indianapolis, IN	Mar 8–14	Live	Dick Weber	Dick Allen, USA (3)	

- *Aired on ABC-TV. All Sunday final rounds were broadcast on ESPN, except the One-A-Day Earl Anthony Memorial, which was on ESPN2. Friday and Saturday telecasts for the PBA World Championship and U.S. Open also aired on ESPN2.
- NQ: Not a full-time PBA member in the USA or Korea, and thus did not qualify for a PBA title.

== 2010–11 PBA Tour Trials ==
The seven bowlers who join the PBA's exempt bowler field for the 2010–11 season via the Regional Players Invitational tournament (which replaced the Tour Trials in 2010) are as follows:

- Dave D'Entremont
- Bobby Hall II
- Ryan Ciminelli
- Lennie Boresch Jr.
- Chris Warren
- David Beres
- Jeff Zaffino

These players join the bowlers who either (1) won a 2009–10 PBA Tour title, (2) earned a multi-year exemption by winning a major title, (3) earned an exemption via 2009–10 points list or (4) were awarded an injury deferment from the 2009–10 season. The total exempt field is 52 bowlers, with one more to be added via the PBA's "Golden Parachute" rule.
