= Professional bowling tournaments in New Orleans =

- Professional Bowling tournaments -- New Orleans played host to PBA Tour events in 1963, 1964, 1966-1978 and 1988-1990. A PBA Tour sponsored exhibition tournament took place in 2009 and 2010.

Tour	Event	Bowling Center	City	Dates	Winner
PBA	New Orleans Coca-Cola PBA Open	Expressway Lanes	Gretna, LA	03/13/1963-03/16/1963	Winner: J. B. Solomon (2)
PBA	New Orleans Coca-Cola PBA Open	Expressway Lanes	Gretna, LA	02/18/1964-02/22/1964	Winner: Bill Allen (5)
PBA	Crescent City Open	Mardi Gras Bowl	New Orleans, LA	09/08/1966-09/12/1966	Winner: Barry Asher (2)
PBA	Lions Club Open	Pelican Lanes	New Orleans, LA	09/14/1967-09/17/1967	Winner: Bill Tucker (3)
PBA	New Orleans Lions Open	Pelican Lanes	New Orleans, LA	03/26/1968-03/30/1968	Winner: Dick Ritger (5)
PBA	New Orleans Lions Open	Pelican Lanes	New Orleans, LA	03/25/1969-03/29/1969	Winner: Dick Weber (18)
PBA	New Orleans Lions Open	Pelican Lanes	New Orleans, LA	03/24/1970-03/28/1970	Winner: Don Johnson (10)
PBA	Don Carter Classic	Pelican Lanes	New Orleans, LA	03/23/1971-03/27/1971	Winner: Johnny Petraglia (5)
PBA	Andy Granatelli's STP Classic	Pelican Lanes	New Orleans, LA	03/22/1972-03/25/1972	Winner: Don Helling (3)
PBA	Lincoln-Mercury Open	Pelican Lanes	New Orleans, LA	02/06/1973-02/10/1973	Winner: Carmen Salvino (11)
PBA	New Orleans Open	Pelican Lanes	New Orleans, LA	03/05/1974-03/09/1974	Winner: Paul Colwell (5)
PBA	Monroe Max-Air Open	Pelican Lanes	New Orleans, LA	03/18/1975-03/22/1975	Winner: Don Helling (4)
PBA	New Orleans Lions Open	Pelican Lanes	Metarie, LA	03/09/1976-03/13/1976	Winner: Louie Moore (2)
PBA	Midas Open	Expressway Lanes	Gretna, LA	02/08/1977-02/12/1977	Winner: Don Johnson (26)
PBA	Midas Golden Challenge	Expressway Lanes	Gretna, LA	02/14/1978-02/18/1978	Winner: Pete Couture (1)
PBA	Don Carter's Greater New Orleans Classic	Don Carter's All-Star Lanes	Harvey, LA	01/25/1988-01/30/1988	Winner: Roger Bowker (1)
PBA	Don Carter's Greater New Orleans Classic	Don Carter's All-Star Lanes	Harvey, LA	02/13/1989-02/18/1989	Winner: Brian Voss (8)
PBA	Don Carter Classic	Don Carter's All-Star Lanes	Kenner, LA	02/05/1990-02/10/1990	Winner: Parker Bohn III (3)
PBA	Chris Paul PBA Celebrity Invitational		Kenner, LA	09/25/2009	Winners: Chris Paul and Jason Belmonte (Invitational, non-title event)
PBA	Chris Paul PBA Celebrity Invitational		New Orleans, LA	12/9/2010-12/12/2010	Winners: Jason Belmonte and Chris Paul (Exhibition Event)
