= Tony Reyes =

American Bowler

Tony Reyes (October 24, 1973 – September 28, 2012) of San Bruno, CA, was a professional right handed ten-pin bowler who competed as a member of the Professional Bowlers Association (PBA) over 14 seasons. He won one national PBA Tour title and eight PBA Regional Tour titles.

== Professional career ==
Reyes reached the top five in 12 PBA Tour tournaments, including three runner-up finishes and one national PBA Tour title at the 2006 Motor City Classic.

En route to winning the Motor City Classic on November 5, 2006, Reyes rolled a 300 game in his semifinal match against Parker Bohn III, the 18th televised perfect game in PBA history. Then to claim his lone tour victory, Reyes defeated Wes Malott 255–238 in the title match. The win qualified Reyes for his first-ever PBA Tournament of Champions appearance in 2007, and he made it all the way to the final match before losing to Tommy Jones.

== Death and legacy ==
At approximately 12:30 a.m. on Friday, September 28, 2012, Reyes tragically died in a car accident on Highway 101 northbound in Redwood City, CA just 26 days before his 39th birthday. This came approximately 7 years after Reyes's father had also died in a tragic accident.

To continue Reyes's legacy, the PBA created the annual Tony Reyes Community Service Award in 2013 to recognize a current member who exemplifies extraordinary community service, charitable, or educational contributions over the course of a season. Reyes' legacy was recognized because of a PBA Regional tournament he launched in honor of late PBA legend Don Johnson, at which Reyes would organize silent auctions and other fundraisers to fight juvenile diabetes.

=== PBA Tony Reyes Community Service Award winners ===
- 2013: Parker Bohn III
- 2014: Missy Parkin
- 2015: Ed Godbout
- 2016: Rhino Page
- 2017: Del Ballard Jr.
- 2018: Chris Barnes
- 2019: Chuck Gardner
- 2020: Danny Wiseman
- 2021: Warren Eales
- 2022: Ryan Shafer
- 2023: Johnny Petraglia
- 2024: Kyle Troup
- 2025: Chris Via

== Other work ==
When he didn't make the televised finals of tournaments, Reyes often worked in the ESPN TV truck for that week's PBA telecast. His job was to log timestamps of potential replays and advise producers of what replays to use. On the occasion of Reyes' 300 game and first title, longtime friend and seven-time PBA Tour winner Robert Smith took over Reyes's duties in the TV truck. "Tony was the TV crew's favorite, hands down," Smith said. "The way they were treating it when Tony was going for 300, it was really awesome to see ... I can remember, clear as day, (the director) pointing directions out to each of the camera guys on the lanes ... 'You do this, you do that — and everybody else shut the f--- up so Tony can shoot 300!'"
