= Guppy Troup =

American ten-pin bowler

Personal information
- Nickname: Guppy
- Born: John Douglas Troup; January 18, 1950 (age 76) Edinburgh, Scotland
- Years active: 1973–2013
- Height: 5 ft 8 in (173 cm)

Bowling Information
- Affiliation: PBA
- Dominant hand: Right
- Wins: 8 PBA Tour; 42 PBA Regional Tour
- 300-games: 27

John Douglas "Guppy" Troup (born 18 January 1950) is a retired ten-pin bowler who competed professionally from the mid-1970s through 2013. During his career on the Professional Bowlers Association (PBA) Tour, he earned eight national titles, along with another 42 titles in PBA Regional Tour competitions. He is a member of the PBA Hall of Fame.

== Career ==
Troup was born on 18 January 1950 in Edinburgh, Scotland. At the age of 3, his family moved to the United States when his father began working at the University of South Carolina. Troup began bowling in his youth and chose his nickname at the age of 11 after becoming a member of The Guppies, a South Carolina team of youth bowlers that he captained. He later said, "We won a state title and we set a state record for juniors back then and it just stuck. I don't know why. I just started telling everybody to start calling me Guppy." In 1973, Troup turned professional, and joined the PBA Tour for the 1976 season. In his first two years on the tour, Troup had little success, and was unable to secure financial backing from a sponsor, forcing him to use personal savings to continue competing in 1978. That was his first full season on tour, and he won his first PBA tournament that year in Battle Creek, Michigan. The victory in the Kessler Open gave Troup an $8,000 first-place prize, doubling his season earnings to that point.

In 1979, Troup set a PBA Tour record with six perfect 300 games. He was unhappy with his performance the following season and considered taking a break from the circuit, but continued playing and won a tournament in Waukegan, Illinois and finished second in the Greater Buffalo Open in consecutive weeks. Early in 1981, Troup broke an ankle. Although the injury caused a significant reduction in his playing schedule, he managed to earn more than $23,000 that year. In 1982, Troup won the first event of the year in Anaheim, California. The win was the first of three for Troup that year. The second came in July at the Molson Bowling Challenge in Windsor, Ontario, Canada. Troup's first-place prize was $13,000, but he received only $11,050 because of a 15 percent tax on PBA Tour bowlers earning $5,000 or more in Canada; he said after the event that he was "ticked off". His third win in 1982 was in October's Northern Ohio Open, and his earnings for the season exceeded $80,000.

Early in 1983, Troup earned a win at February's Quaker State Open in Grand Prairie, Texas, the sixth PBA Tour tournament he had won in his career. He then entered a down period, not qualifying for a televised final for more than a year. That streak came to an end at the 1984 US Open. Troup defeated his first three opponents in the stepladder finals to reach the championship match against Mark Roth, but lost by seven pins as he was unable to roll a tenth-frame strike which would have secured a title. He did win $20,000 for the second-place finish. Later in 1984, Troup had a four-tournament stretch that included three televised finals and a win in Columbus, Ohio. He again earned more than $80,000 that season. Troup's eighth PBA Tour victory came in 1985 at the Austin Open.

By the early 1990s, he had curtailed his playing schedule following the birth of his son. His final appearance in a televised stepladder round was on February 28, 1998, at the Storm Flagship Open in Erie, Pennsylvania. Overall, Troup had 28 career top-five finishes, including ten trips to the championship match, where he compiled an 8–2 record.

Troup joined the PBA Senior Tour in 2000 and was voted the circuit's Rookie of the Year. He is in semi-retirement as of 2014, and holds multiple jobs at a school when not on the PBA Senior Tour. As of 2008, Troup had 41 victories in PBA Regional Tour tournaments, in addition to his eight national tour wins.

On 13 December 2025, the PBA announced that Troup had been elected to the PBA Hall of Fame by the Veteran's Committee. He will be the only player inducted in the 2026 Hall of Fame class.

=== PBA Tour titles ===
1. 1978 Kessler Open (Battle Creek, MI)
2. 1980 Waukegan Super Touch Open (Waukegan, IL)
3. 1982 Miller High Life Classic (Anaheim, CA)
4. 1982 Molson Bowling Challenge (Windsor, ON, Canada)
5. 1982 Northern Ohio Open (Fairview Park, OH)
6. 1983 Quaker State Open (Grand Prairie, TX)
7. 1984 Budweiser Classic (Columbus, OH)
8. 1985 Austin Open (Austin, TX)

== Style ==
Troup has been known for wearing flashy outfits while bowling; the Pittsburgh Press' Bob Kravitz called him the PBA Tour's "gaudiest dresser". He said of his style of dress that "People tuned in to see what kind of pants I'd be wearing. They didn't care how I bowled." Troup has supplemented his attire with accessories that have included gold jewellery and sunglasses. Other items he has worn have had fish images on them, including pants, shoes, and earrings. Troup also has a strike celebration, a forward hip movement that he named the "Gup Thrust." In 1988, sportswriter Frank Deford called Troup "about the only pro bowler these days with a flamboyant public persona."

== Personal life ==
Troup resides in Taylorsville, North Carolina. He is a widower, and has a son, Kyle, who became a PBA member and started bowling on the PBA Tour. Kyle won his first title in May 2015 at the PBA Wolf Open in Shawnee, Oklahoma. This win made Guppy and Kyle Troup the fourth father-and-son combination to each win titles on the standard PBA Tour. Dick Weber/Pete Weber, Don Johnson/Jimmy Johnson and Don McCune/Eugene McCune preceded the Troups, and the group has since been joined by Eugene and Kevin McCune.
