= Alex Horton (bowler) =

Right-handed American ten-pin bowler (born 2003)

Personal information
- Nationality: American
- Born: November 26, 2003 (age 22) Douglassville, Pennsylvania, U.S.
- Years active: 2025–present

Bowling Information
- Sport: Tenpin bowling
- Affiliation: PBA
- Rookie year: 2026
- Dominant hand: Right (two-handed delivery)
- Wins: 2 PBA Tour (1 major); 1 PBA Regional Tour
- Sponsors: Brunswick, VISE grips, BowlerX

Alexander Horton (born November 26, 2003) is an American professional ten-pin bowler from Douglassville, Pennsylvania. He joined the Professional Bowlers Association in 2025 after a collegiate career at Indiana Institute of Technology ("Indiana Tech"). By way of a PBA Regional Tour title in September 2025, Horton qualified for and eventually won the PBA Tournament of Champions on April 26, 2026 for his first PBA Tour title and first major. He then won his second PBA Tour title just 16 days later at the PBA Shark Championship, part of the 2026 PBA World Series of Bowling.

Horton uses the two-handed shovel-style delivery with a dominant right hand. He is sponsored by Brunswick, VISE grips and BowlerX.

== Amateur career ==
Horton attended Daniel Boone Area High School in Birdsboro, Pennsylvania, where he was a four-time varsity letter winner. Alex won the PA District 3 bowling singles championship in 2018 and 2021, and he won the 2021 PA State High School Singles championship.

Horton went on to attend Indiana Tech, where he majored in Financial Services. In his freshman year (2021–22), his Warriors team were the NAIA Men's Bowling national champions. They also won the 2023 PBA Collegiate Invitational. He was a first-team NAIA All-American in the 2023–24 season.

== Professional career ==
Horton became a PBA member in late 2025. He won the PBA East Region RPI (Regional Players Invitational) in September of that year for his first PBA Regional Tour title. This title allowed him to enter the pre-tournament qualifier (PTQ) at the PBA Tournament of Champions in his rookie season (2026). He made it out of the PTQ and finished qualifying and match play as the #2 seed for the April 26 final round. He defeated six-time PBA titlist Andrew Anderson in the semifinal match, then won the Tournament of Champions title with a final match victory over the top seed, Canada's Zach Wilkins. Horton became the fourth rookie to win a title in the 2026 season, an unprecedented occurrence in the history of the PBA. He is also the fourth African American player to win a PBA Tour title, following George Branham III, Gary Faulkner Jr. and DeeRonn Booker.

On May 12, 2026, Horton won his second title at the PBA Shark Championship, the fourth event of World Series of Bowling XVII. After knocking off 2026 U.S. Open champion Patrick Dombrowski in the semifinal match, he topped #1 seed and four-time titlist Ronnie Russell with a two-game sweep in the "race to two points" final match. Despite not competing until the fourth event of the 2026 season, Horton finished seventh in earnings ($137,300) and 18th in points.

=== PBA Tour titles ===
Major tournaments in bold text.

1. **2026 PBA Tournament of Champions** (Fairlawn, OH)
2. 2026 PBA WSOB XVII Shark Championship (Lakeville, MN)
