= Ryan Shafer =

American ten-pin bowler

Personal information
- Born: August 18, 1966 (age 60) Horseheads, New York, U.S.
- Years active: 1986−present
- Height: 170 cm (5 ft 7 in)

Bowling Information
- Affiliation: PBA
- Rookie year: 1987
- Dominant hand: Right (cranker delivery)
- Wins: 5 PBA Tour; 29 PBA Regional Tour; 9 PBA50 Regional Tour
- Sponsors: Hammer Bowling, Vise Grips

Ryan Shafer (born August 18, 1966) of Horseheads, New York is a right-handed professional ten-pin bowler who has won five national titles as a member of the Professional Bowlers Association (PBA). He currently participates on both the PBA Tour and the PBA50 Tour. He has also won 29 PBA Regional titles and nine PBA50 Regional titles. and has collected over $1.75 million in PBA earnings. Shafer rolled the 19th-ever televised 300 game in PBA Tour history, accomplished March 18, 2007 at the PBA Pepsi Championship, and set a PBA record for a televised event by rolling 18 consecutive strikes overall.

Shafer is a national staff member for the Hammer division of Brunswick, after previously representing the Track brand. He is also sponsored by Vise Grips. In his early career, he was sponsored by Storm.

== PBA career ==
Shafer joined the PBA in 1986, and was named PBA Rookie of the Year in the 1987 season. After laboring on tour for 13 years without a national title, Shafer finally broke through on January 21, 2000 with a victory over PBA Hall of Famer Mike Aulby in The Orleans Casino Open. He would win a second title in 2000 at the PBA Wichita Open on July 1, and would later be named Bowlers Digest Player of the Year for the 2000 season. In addition to his two wins, Shafer made match play 11 times in 19 events and had five more championship round appearances during the season, including a runner-up finish at the Tournament of Champions major.

In 2001, Shafer repeated as champion at The Orleans Casino Open, earning his third PBA Tour title. On November 23, 2003, he defeated Chris Barnes in the final match to collect his fourth title at the PBA Empire State Open. His fifth and (to date) final PBA Tour title came at age 49 in the 2015 PBA Xtra Frame Gene Carter’s Pro Shop Classic.

=== Accomplishments and Accolades ===
Shafer rolled the PBA Tour’s 19th-ever televised perfect 300 game at the 2007 PBA Pepsi Championship in Indianapolis. Shafer opened the next game with six more strikes, setting a PBA record for a televised final round by rolling 18 consecutive strikes. He would unfortunately be denied the title when he was defeated by Norm Duke in the final match. Shafer would post another televised 300 game during a singles match at the 2011 GEICO PBA Team Shootout, a non-title event featuring PBA players.

Shafer has been called one of the most underrated players on the PBA Tour over his 30+ year career by bowling writer Bill Spigner, PBA TV analyst Randy Pedersen, and others. This is mainly based on Shafer’s performances in major championships. He holds the PBA record for the most major championship final round appearances without winning (16), and has finished runner-up in a major five times among his 13 total runner-up finishes. Overall, Shafer has made 56 top five finishes in PBA Tour events.

Shafer is a two-time winner of the PBA Steve Nagy Sportsmanship Award (2008–09 and 2012–13). In 2022, he won the PBA Tony Reyes Community Service Award for his fundraising tournaments that benefit mental health causes, particularly suicide prevention and awareness.

In November 2025, Shafer was ranked #23 on the PBA's "Best 25 Players of the Last 25 Seasons" list. His ranking was accompanied by the caption: "A top-25 ranking without a major title and just five standard titles is a testament to Shafer's consistency in major championships. Only nine players earned more than Shafer's 13 top-five finishes in majors [since 2000]."

=== PBA Tour titles ===
1. 2000 The Orleans Casino Open (Las Vegas, Nevada)
2. 2000 PBA Wichita Open (Wichita, Kansas)
3. 2001 The Orleans Casino Open (Las Vegas, Nevada)
4. 2003 PBA Empire State Open (Latham, New York)
5. 2015 PBA Xtra Frame Gene Carter’s Pro Shop Classic (Middletown, Delaware)

=== Top five finishes in PBA majors ===
1. 1988 Seagram's Coolers U.S. Open
2. 1992 Bud Light PBA National Championship
3. 1998 BPAA U.S. Open
4. 2000 Bayer/Brunswick Touring Players Championship
5. 2000 Brunswick World Tournament of Champions (runner-up)
6. 2001 Bowling’s U.S. Open
7. 2002 PBA Tournament of Champions (runner-up)
8. 2003 PBA World Championship
9. 2006 63rd U.S. Open (runner-up)
10. 2006 Denny’s PBA World Championship
11. 2008 H&R Block Tournament of Champions
12. 2008 Denny’s PBA World Championship (runner-up)
13. 2009 H&R Block Tournament of Champions
14. 2011 68th Lumber Liquidators U.S. Open
15. 2011 PBA World Championship (runner-up)
16. 2012 69th U.S. Open

== Awards and honors ==
- 1987 PBA Rookie of the Year
- 2000 Bowlers Journal Player of the Year
- Holds PBA Tour record for consecutive strikes rolled in a televised event (18 in 2007)
- 2x PBA Steve Nagy Sportsmanship Award winner (2008–09, 2012–13)
- 3x PBA East Region Player of the Year (out of 6 years eligible)
- 2022 PBA Tony Reyes Community Service Award winner

== Personal ==
Shafer was diagnosed with Type 1 diabetes at age 19. He became more outspoken about dealing with the disease when he began wearing a visible insulin pump on PBA telecasts in 2005. He has since become a spokesperson for Animas insulin pumps.

Shafer’s first wife, Michelle, died in early 2014, just five days before he was scheduled to accept his second PBA Steve Nagy Sportsmanship Award. Michelle took her own life after dealing with depression for a number of years. In honor of his late wife, Ryan started the Michelle Shafer Fund for Suicide Prevention and Awareness and began running fundraising tournaments for this cause. Ryan continues to run the annual tournament in Corning, New York as of 2022, with his current wife Jennifer and other volunteers. The PBA honored Shafer in 2022 with the PBA Tony Reyes Community Service Award.

When not bowling tournaments, Ryan runs his bowling pro shop.
