= Motor City Classic =

Ten-pin bowling tournament

The Motor City Classic is a ten-pin bowling tournament on the PBA Tour. It is among the first regular season events on the tour and is played at Taylor Lanes in Taylor, Michigan. The tournament has existed since 2006, with Tony Reyes winning the inaugural event over Wes Malott, 255-238. Reyes also rolled a 300 game in the semi-finals of the 2006 event. Walter Ray Williams Jr. is the defending champion.

For the 2008–09 season, the tournament in Taylor was renamed the Chameleon Championship, because the PBA chose to make it one of six tournaments named after a PBA oil pattern in its "Versatility Swing."

For the 2009–10 season, the PBA made the Motor City Classic part of the multi-tournament PBA World Series of Bowling event. The qualifying rounds of the tournament, which determined the top four bowlers for the TV finals, continued to be contested at Taylor Lanes. The TV finals were taped September 5 in nearby Allen Park, MI for a November 1 ESPN broadcast.

== Past results ==
Year	Champion	Runner-up	Score
2006	Tony Reyes	Wes Malott	255–238
2007	Walter Ray Williams, Jr.	Eugene McCune	214–194
2008	Mike Machuga	Bill O'Neill	209–204
2009	Walter Ray Williams, Jr.	Chris Barnes	238–230
