= Deo Benard =

American professional ten-pin bowler

Personal information
- Born: December 24, 2003 (age 22)

Bowling Information
- Affiliation: PBA
- Rookie year: 2019
- Dominant hand: Left (two-hand delivery)
- Wins: 1 PBA Tour; 15 PBA Regional Tour
- Sponsors: DV8 Bowling, VISE Grips

Deo Benard (born December 24, 2003) is an American professional ten-pin bowler who competes as a member of the Professional Bowlers Association (PBA). At age 20, Benard won the 2024 PBA WSOB XV Cheetah Championship, defeating top seed and multiple PBA Tour titlist Marshall Kent. He bowls using the two-handed shovel style delivery with a dominant left hand. Benard is sponsored by DV8 Bowling and VISE grips.

Before his first national PBA Tour win, he was a multiple-time PBA Regional Tour winner. At age 16, he was the youngest PBA member to win a Regional title. He won three Regional titles in 2023 alone at age 19, and was named PBA Southwest Region Player of the Year. He was named Southwest Region Player of the Year again in 2025. On December 14, 2025, Benard won the PBA Regional Players Invitational in Reno, Nevada for his 15th PBA Regional title and a 2026 PBA Tour exemption.

Benard was voted by his peers to receive the PBA Steve Nagy Sportsmanship Award for the 2025 season.

== Personal ==
Benard lives in Roanoke, Texas. His father, Rick, was also a PBA member who won four PBA Regional titles.
