= Steve Jaros =

American professional bowlier

Personal information
- Born: September 24, 1965 (age 60) Bolingbrook, Illinois, U.S.
- Years active: 1984-2011
- Height: 6 ft 1 in (185 cm)

Bowling Information
- Affiliation: PBA
- Dominant hand: Right
- Wins: 7 PBA Tour (1 major); 43 PBA Regional Tour

Steve Jaros (born August 24, 1965) of Yorkville, Illinois is an American former professional 10-pin bowler and member of the Professional Bowlers Association. While on the PBA Tour, Jaros won 7 national tournament titles (including 1 major), was a 10-time runner-up, with an additional 27 appearances in the top-5. He also won 43 PBA Regional Tour titles (third most all-time).

En route to winning the 1999 Chattanooga Open (February 13), Jaros rolled a 300-game against Ricky Ward in the second stepladder match, the 14th televised perfect game in PBA history. This served as a bit of redemption for Jaros, as he had rolled a 129 at the 1992 Brunswick World Memorial Open, the lowest-ever game on a PBA telecast. This dubious distinction would remain with Jaros until 2011, when Tom Daugherty posted a televised score of 100.

The lone major title for Jaros came in 2005 at the PBA Tournament of Champions, beating two previous ToC winners on his way to the title. He topped Bryan Goebel, 247–186, in the semifinals and then defeated Norm Duke in the championship match, 248–242. Jaros made a bid to repeat as a Tournament of Champions titlist the very next season (2006), but he was defeated in the final match by Chris Barnes.

In 2024, Jaros was inducted into the PBA Hall of Fame by the Veteran's Committee. He earned just shy of $1.75 million in his PBA career.

== PBA Tour titles ==
Major championships are in bold type.

1. 1991 Choice Hotels International Summer Classic (Edmond, OK)
2. 1993 Choice Hotels Summer Classic (Edmond, OK)
3. 1999 Chattanooga Open (Chattanooga, TN)
4. 2003 PBA Toledo Open (Toledo, OH)
5. 2004 PBA Days Inn Open (Dallas, TX)
6. 2004 PBA Uniroyal Tire Classic (Indianapolis, IN)
7. **2005 PBA Dexter Tournament of Champions** (Uncasville, CT)
