= Rick Allen (sportscaster) =

American sports announcer

- Born: Rick Allen; June 17, 1969 (age 57); Grand Island, Nebraska, U.S.
- Years active: 2002–present
- Sports commentary career
- Genre: Play-by-play
- Sports: NASCAR, College football, college basketball, Track and field, Professional bowling
- Employer: FOX (2003–2014); NBC (2014–2024); The CW (2024–present); Carolina Panthers (2025–present)

Rick Allen (born June 17, 1969) is an American television personality and play-by-play announcer. He currently works for the Carolina Panthers as a public address system announcer, CW Sports as a college football play-by-play announcer as well as an alternate TV play-by-play for the CARS Tour. He is currently the play-by-play announcer for PBA Tour bowling events on The CW since the 2026 season, working alongside analyst Kyle Sherman.

He is best-known for having been the lead play-by-play commentator for NASCAR on NBC on their NASCAR Cup and Xfinity Series coverage from 2015 to 2024. He also appeared on a select IndyCar and International Motor Sports Association and track & field events when he worked for NBC Sports. He previously did play-by-play broadcasting for NASCAR on Speed and Fox for the NASCAR Truck Series from 2003 to 2014.

== Biography ==
Allen was the second of two siblings. Allen grew up in Grand Island, Nebraska, and was a walk on for the Nebraska Cornhuskers track and field team, where he was a letter winner all four seasons, a three-time All-American in the sport, winning two Big Eight Conference decathlon titles (1991–92). He received his bachelor's degree of communications from the university. After graduation, he worked as a public address announcer for the University of Nebraska–Lincoln athletic department, and later at local dirt oval racetracks including Eagle Raceway, where Fox Sports found him.

From 2003 to mid-2014, Allen worked for Fox Sports, where his main duty was calling the NASCAR Camping World Truck Series and ARCA Racing Series on SPEED and later Fox Sports 1. He occasionally covered Nationwide Series (now NASCAR O'Reilly Auto Parts Series) events.

On December 4, 2013, it was announced that Allen would become the lead announcer for NASCAR on NBC for the Sprint Cup Series and Nationwide Series starting in 2015.

During the Truck Series Eldora race on July 23, 2014, Allen announced that it would be his last race at Fox Sports, as he was now bound only to NBC.

It was announced in 2016 that Allen would be joining the IndyCar Series on NBC broadcast team for select Verizon IndyCar Series events beginning at Phoenix in 2016, filling in for regular IndyCar play-by-play announcer Leigh Diffey because Diffey worked with NBC's Formula One coverage.

In 2024, NBC Sports announced that Allen would be replaced by Diffey as NASCAR Cup Series play-by-play announcer, but would remain on Xfinity Series telecasts for the rest of the year, which moved to The CW ahead of the network's full-season TV coverage of the series beginning in 2025. NBC had told him prior to the season that he would only do the opening set of NBC's scheduled races before moving Diffey into the booth.

On June 11, 2025, it was announced that Allen would be in the CARS Tour broadcast booth for FloRacing. On August 8, Allen announced that he got a job with the Carolina Panthers and would work as their Entertainment PA system announcer for the 2025 season, staying in the Charlotte metropolitan area where most of the NASCAR industry is based. On August 27, Adam Stern from Sports Business Journal tweeted that Allen would be returning to The CW as a play-by-play announcer for college football games.

In December 2025, The Professional Bowlers Association announced that Allen will be the play-by-play announcer for PBA Tour bowling coverage on CW Sports in the 2026 season. He is joined by analyst Kyle Sherman, a two-time PBA champion.
