= Hugh Miller (bowler) =

American professional ten-pin bowler

Personal information
- Born: November 7, 1956 (age 69) Seattle, Washington, U.S.
- Education: Mercer Island High School Mercer Island, WA
- Years active: 1979–2026
- Height: 5 ft 11 in (180 cm)

Bowling Information
- Affiliation: PBA
- Rookie year: 1979
- Dominant hand: Left (stroker delivery)
- Wins: 7 PBA Tour; 47 PBA Regional Tour; 3 PBA50 Tour
- 300-games: 50

Hugh Miller (born November 7, 1956) of Mercer Island, Washington, is an American retired professional ten-pin bowler and member of the Professional Bowlers Association. He competed on both the PBA Tour and PBA50 Tour. He was a seven-time winner on the PBA Tour and earned three titles on the PBA50/Senior Tour.

Hugh's first four championship round appearances on TV all netted victories, including two Quaker State Opens (1980 and 1984), the 1980 Amarillo Open, and 1983 Tucson Open.

Miller's last PBA Tour victory was at Dream Bowl 2002 in Shin-Yokohama, Japan, defeating Yukio Yamazaki 431–427 in the two-game championship series. This win also set a then PBA Tour record of longest span between first and most recent victory at 22 years and over 7 months.

Among Miller's titles on the PBA50/Senior Tour, his first victory at the 2008 PBA Senior Epicenter Classic included a perfect 300 game in the title match against 2005 champion Dale Eagle, winning 300–268. Miller's second PBA Senior title was at the 2011 Senior Dayton Classic, defeating Tom Baker in the championship match 234-227. His last victory on the senior tour was at the 2012 Senior South Shore Open.

In Team USA competition, Miller, along with Ron Mohr, won the Doubles gold medal at the 2013 World Senior Bowling Championships in Las Vegas.

== PBA Tour titles ==
1. 1980 Quaker State Open (Grand Prairie, TX)
2. 1980 Amarillo Open (Amarillo, TX)
3. 1983 Tucson Open (Tucson, AZ)
4. 1984 Quaker State Open (Grand Prairie, TX)
5. 1990 Fresno Open (Fresno, CA)
6. 1992 Beaumont PBA Doubles Classic with Parker Bohn III (Beaumont, TX)
7. Dream Bowl 2002 (Yokohama, Japan)
