= Kyle Sherman =

American ten-pin bowler

Personal information
- Born: 2 March 1994 (age 32)
- Years active: 2016-Present

Bowling Information
- Affiliation: PBA
- Dominant hand: Right (tweener delivery)
- Wins: 2 PBA Tour
- Sponsors: Storm Bowling, Turbo Grips

Kyle Sherman (born March 2, 1994) is an American professional ten-pin bowler and bowling broadcaster from O'Fallon, Missouri. He currently competes on the PBA Tour. He is known for winning the 2019 Storm PBA/PWBA Striking Against Breast Cancer Mixed Doubles with Amanda Greene, and the PBA Cheetah Championship at the 2022 PBA World Series of Bowling.

He is the co-creator of the "Brad and Kyle" YouTube channel along with fellow PBA bowler Brad Miller. The channel currently has over 150,000 subscribers. On February 10, 2026, Sherman was named lead analyst/color commentator for the CW Sports PBA broadcasts in the 2026 season. Later, Sherman was also named analyst for the PBA Tour events carried by CBS Sports Network and CBS.

He is currently a member of the Storm Bowling and Turbo Grips pro staffs.

== Amateur career ==
Sherman bowled for and attended college at Lindenwood University. He was a three-time collegiate All-American at Lindenwood, and he won the 2014 Intercollegiate Team Championships title. He also won the 2014 Youth Open team Championship, and the Junior World Team Challenge.

He is a one-time member of the Junior team USA (2015), and a two-time member of Team USA (2020 and 2021).

== Professional career ==
Sherman has been bowling on the PBA tour since 2016.

His first televised finals appearance came at the 2019 Roth/Holman Doubles Championship. He and Brad Miller earned the top seed after the qualifying rounds and faced off against Matt Ogle and Sean Rash in the championship match, which they lost by a score of 213–200.

His second televised finals appearance came at the 2019 PBA World Series of Bowling Cheetah Championship, where he finished runner-up to Dick Allen, 195–234.

On July 29, 2019, Sherman won his first PBA tour title during the PBA/PWBA Striking Against Breast Cancer Mixed Doubles tournament, partnered with Amanda Greene. They qualified as the #5 seeds to advance to the stepladder finals, where they climbed the ladder and defeated top seeds Erin McCarthy and A. J. Johnson in the championship match.

During the 2022 PBA Players Championship Southwest Qualifier, he faced off against his friend and doubles partner Brad Miller in the opening match, defeating him 213–205. Sherman continued through to the semifinals where he eventually lost to Arturo Quintero.

Sherman won his second PBA Tour title and first on national television at the 2022 Cheetah Championship, part of that season's World Series of Bowling. He qualified second in the event and faced Kris Koeltzow in the semifinal match, defeating him 216–212. In the championship match he bowled against Puerto Rico's Cristian Azcona, defeating him 214–184 to win his second PBA title and first singles title.

In 2019 and 2022, Sherman qualified for the PBA playoffs based on his consistency during the season. He lost in the second round in 2019, and the first round in 2022.

In the 2023 USBC Masters, Sherman qualified third out of 390 bowlers. He won his opening stepladder match against Sean Rash, but lost to Michael Martell in the semifinal match.

== PBA Tour Titles ==
1. 2019: Storm PBA/PWBA Striking Against Breast Cancer Mixed Doubles w/Amanda Greene (Houston, TX)
2. 2022: PBA World Series of Bowling Cheetah Championship (Wauwatosa, WI)

== Career statistics ==
Statistics are through the last complete PBA season.

Season	Events	Cashes	Match Play	CRA+	PBA Titles	Average	Earnings ($)
2016	2	2	0	0	0	208.36	2,667
2017	17	10	6	0	0	215.29	20,740
2018	13	8	4	0	0	217.14	23,260
2019	24	20	14	4	1	216.08	93,267
2020	9	6	3	0	0	218.82	22,845
2021	8	3	---	0	0	212.91	9,400
2022	14	9	---	1	1	217.96	61,800
2023	12	4	1	1	0	212.91	42,150
2024	11	6	1	0	0	220.20	37,040
2025	13	3	0	0	0	212.36	4,250
2026	15	7	4	1	0	217.36	34,500
Totals	138	78	33	7	2	---	$351,919

+CRA = Championship Round Appearances

== Broadcasting career ==
Sherman is the lead analyst for live PBA televised finals broadcasts on The CW, starting in the 2026 season, working with play-by-play announcer Rick Allen. He also called three of the five PBA World Series of Bowling events on CBS Sports Network and CBS, alongside play-by-play man Dave Ryan. (Sherman made the telecast as a bowler in the other two events, and was replaced by Chris Barnes.) On the new role, Sherman said he wasn't even told he was being considered until he got the call offering him the job. "I kind of just assumed Randy (Pedersen) was still doing the role. I guess there were rumblings, but before the PBA Tour season there's always hearsay."
