= Lon McEachern =

American sports commentator

- Born: 1956 or 1957 (age 68–69); Memphis, Tennessee, U.S.
- Education: University of California, Santa Barbara (BA)
- Occupation: Sports commentator
- Known for: Coverage of World Series of Poker
- Style: Play by play
- Television: ESPN
- Spouse: Carol Czyzewski (m. 1981)
- Children: 2
- Relatives: Matthew Wood (nephew)

Lon McEachern (/mɪˈkɛrɪn/; born 1956 or 1957) is an American sports commentator most known for his hand-by-hand commentary of the World Series of Poker on ESPN. He is known as the "voice of poker".

== Early life and education ==
McEachern was born in Memphis, Tennessee, one of four children. His family later relocated to the San Francisco Bay Area and McEachern was raised in Corte Madera in Marin County until the age of 19. He attended Redwood High School and played baseball while a student. He was teammates with future MLB shortstop Buddy Biancalana in his senior year and graduated in 1975.

McEachern attended Santa Barbara City College and was a baseball teammate of future-MLB player Jesse Orosco. He later attended the University of California, Santa Barbara and graduated in 1980 with a B.A. in communications. While enrolled at UC Santa Barbara, he worked at the campus radio station KCSB-FM.

== Career ==
Out of college, McEachern worked radio at KTMS, the former home of another UCSB graduate in Jim Rome, before entering the television industry with KCOY-TV. He moved back to the San Francisco Bay Area in the early 1990s to work at KGO-TV and KPIX-TV. He also freelanced for ESPN, including covering play-by-play of the X Games. By 2002, McEachern had left the television industry.

In 2002, ESPN reached out to McEachern, who was working as a mortgage banker at the time, to cover poker. He was brought back in 2003 alongside Norman Chad for the 2003 World Series of Poker. The tournament was won by Chris Moneymaker and led to the Moneymaker effect and a corresponding surge in poker's popularity. McEachern continued as a mortgage banker for nearly five years, doing poker coverage for ESPN on the side. As of 2017, he has covered every World Series of Poker main event since ESPN acquired the broadcasting rights.

McEachern also covered play-by-play of the PBA Tour during the 2012–13 season alongside color analyst Randy Pedersen.

In 2007 McEachern was the commentator for Pride 33 along with fighters Frank Trigg and Josh Barnett.

== Personal life ==
McEachern married Carol Czyzewski, a fellow UC Santa Barbara alumna, in 1981 and has two children. His nephew, Matthew Wood, is a sound engineer for Skywalker Sound and has worked on numerous Star Wars films.
