= Bob Strampe (bowler) =

American professional bowler (1931 – 2024)

Personal information
- Born: Robert Henry Strampe; April 14, 1931 Paullina, Iowa, U.S.
- Died: July 12, 2024 (aged 93) Marysville, Michigan, U.S.
- Years active: 1961−1990
- Height: 5 ft 10 in (178 cm)

Bowling Information
- Affiliation: PBA
- Rookie year: 1962
- Dominant hand: Right
- Wins: 7 PBA Tour (3 majors); 1964 PBA Player of the Year

Bob Strampe (/ˈstræmpiː/ STRAM-pee; April 14, 1931 – July 12, 2024) was a U.S. veteran, a right-handed professional bowler and member of the Professional Bowlers Association (PBA).

Before his professional bowling tenure, Bob served honorably in the United States Air Force from 1951 to 1955 and the Air Force reserves from 1955 to 1959.

While on the PBA Tour, Bob captured 7 titles (including 3 majors), 5 runner-up finishes, and an additional 23 appearances in the top-5.

Among his 3 major tournament victories, he won 2 of them during the 1964 season, the BPAA All Star (now the U.S. Open) and the PBA National Championship (now renamed as the PBA World Championship). With those wins and topping the PBA Tour in earnings that season, Bob won the 1964 Sporting News PBA Player of the Year award. Strampe's third major came at the 1966 ABC Masters.

Bob's last televised bowling appearance was at the finals of the 1990 PBA Senior/Touring Pro Doubles Championship in Cheektowaga, New York with doubles partner Billy Young Jr., finishing in 3rd place.

Bob was inducted into the USBC Hall of Fame in 1977, the PBA Hall of Fame in 1987, the Iowa Sports Hall of Fame, and the Michigan Sports Hall of Fame in 2012.

During the PBA's 50th season in 2008–09, Strampe was named one of the "PBA’s 50 Greatest Players of the Last 50 Years" by a panel of bowling experts commissioned by the PBA.

On Friday, July 12, 2024, Bob Strampe died at his home at the age of 93.

== PBA Tour Victories ==
Major championships are in bold type.

1. **1964 BPAA All-Star** (Dallas, TX)
2. **1964 PBA National Championship** (Long Island, NY)
3. 1965 Continental PBA Open (Detroit, MI)
4. 1965 Northern California PBA Open (San Francisco, CA)
5. **1966 ABC Masters** (Rochester, NY)
6. 1968 Buffalo Open (Buffalo, NY)
7. 1968 Waukegan Open (Waukegan, IL)
