= Eugene McCune =

American ten-pin bowler (born 1968)

Personal information
- Born: June 29, 1968 (age 58)

Bowling Information
- Sport: Tenpin bowling
- Affiliation: PBA
- Rookie year: 1986
- Dominant hand: Right
- Wins: 3 PBA Tour; 3 PBA50 Tour; 24 PBA Regional Tour; 7 PBA50 Regional Tour

Eugene McCune (born June 29, 1968) of Munster, Indiana is a right-handed American professional ten-pin bowler known for winning three PBA titles from 2002 to 2012. His late father is PBA and USBC Hall of Famer Don McCune, and his son is 2023 PBA Players Championship winner, Kevin McCune. Thus, Eugene is the third son and fifth father to be part of a father-son duo of PBA Tour title winners. The other duos are Dick and Pete Weber, Don and Jimmy Johnson, and Guppy and Kyle Troup. The McCunes constitute the only three-generation family of PBA Tour title holders.

On Tour, Eugene was known as the "Human Rocket Launcher" for his ball speed. Being able to regularly roll the ball above 22 MPH (35.4 KPH), he holds two scoring records on the PBA's short Cheetah oil pattern. He toppled 3,647 pins in a 14-game qualifying block (260.5 average) in 2005, and 2,468 pins during a nine-game block (274.2 average, including two 300 games) in 2010. Not surprisingly, two of his three PBA Tour titles were earned at the PBA Cheetah Open/Cheetah Championship. In the 2010 event, he got a strike on the final fill ball of the tenth frame to defeat Hall of Famer Norm Duke by a single pin, 238–237.

Eugene McCune also holds 3 PBA50 Tour titles, 24 PBA Regional Tour titles and 7 PBA50 Regional Tour titles.

== PBA Tour titles ==
1. 2002 PBA Banquet Classic (Wyoming, Michigan)
2. 2010 PBA WSOB II Cheetah Championship (Las Vegas, Nevada)
3. 2012 PBA Cheetah Open (Fountain Valley, California)

== PBA50 Tour titles ==
As of August 2023, Eugene McCune has won three PBA50 titles.

1. 2018 PBA50 South Shore Open (Hammond, Indiana)
2. 2019 PBA50 Spectrum Lanes Open (Wyoming, Michigan)
3. 2021 PBA50 South Shore Open (Hammond, Indiana)
