= Jason Couch =

American professional ten-pin bowler

Personal information
- Born: November 8, 1969 (age 56)
- Years active: 1991–present

Bowling Information
- Affiliation: PBA
- Rookie year: 1989
- Dominant hand: Left (cranker delivery)
- Wins: 16 PBA Tour (4 majors); 4 PBA50 Tour; 26 PBA Regional Tour; 1 PBA50 Regional Tour
- Sponsors: Brunswick, Dexter shoes, Turbo Grips

Jason Couch (born November 8, 1969) is an American ten-pin bowler on the Professional Bowlers Association (PBA) Tour, and a member of the PBA and USBC Halls of Fame. A left-handed cranker, Couch graduated from Clermont High School in Clermont, Florida and still resides in Clermont. He owns 16 PBA Tour titles, including four major championships, plus four titles on the PBA50 Tour. He also owns 26 PBA Regional Tour titles and one PBA50 Regional Tour title.

After being a national staff member with Ebonite for much of his career, Couch is now sposored by Ebonite's parent company Brunswick. He is also sponsored by Dexter shoes and Turbo Grip inserts.

== PBA career ==
Couch joined the PBA in 1991. In his first full season (1992), he made his first TV show at the 1992 Quaker State Open, and won PBA Rookie of the Year honors. Jason's first title came at the 1993 Tums Classic, defeating Brian Voss in the final match. Later that year he won his first major title at the 1993 Touring Players Championship. After four more titles between 1995 and 1999, Couch pulled off a historic "three-peat" in the Tournament of Champions, winning consecutive events in 1999, 2000 and 2002. (The event was not contested in 2001 because the PBA switched from a calendar year to a fall-spring seasonal format.)

Couch's 14th and 15th career titles came in back-to-back events in 2007, the first and only time he had done this in his career. After a four-year drought, he won his 16th and final PBA Tour title at the 2011 Mark Roth Plastic Ball Championship, an event where players were limited to only two older-technology plastic bowling balls for the entire tournament.

Couch earned over $1.7 million over his PBA Tour career. He had season-ending knee surgery in 2007 and had to defer his 2007–08 exemption to 2008–09. He was ranked #24 on the PBA's 2008–09 list of "50 Greatest Players of the Last 50 Years." Through the end of the 2010–11 season, Jason had recorded 41 perfect 300 games in PBA events. In February 2012, he was elected to the PBA Hall of Fame. Also in 2012, Couch announced his retirement from full-time competitive bowling on the PBA Tour, although he continued to have a role on the tour as a ball representative for Ebonite and as manager of the Philadelphia Hitmen PBA League team.

Couch ranked #19 on the PBA's 2025 "Best 25 PBA Players of the Last 25 Seasons" list. The ranking was based on a points system that took into account standard titles, major titles, top-five finishes and Player of the Year awards.

Couch joined the PBA50 Tour in 2020, only to have the season canceled due to the COVID-19 pandemic. He won the second event of the 2021 season, the Johnny Petraglia BVL Open, for his first PBA50 Tour title. On April 25, 2024, Couch won his second PBA50 Tour title in the PBA50 Hamtramck Singles Classic Open. His third PBA50 title was earned on July 11, 2025 at the PBA50 Ballard Championship. On May 10, 2026, Couch won his fourth PBA50 Tour title at the PBA50 Monacelli Championship.

=== PBA Tour titles ===
Major championships are in bold text.

1. 1993 Tums Classic (Windsor Locks, Connecticut)
2. **1993 Touring Players Championship** (Indianapolis, Indiana)
3. 1995 Bowlers Journal Classic (Mechanicsburg, Pennsylvania)
4. 1995 Indianapolis Open (Indianapolis, Indiana)
5. 1998 Showboat Invitational (Las Vegas, Nevada)
6. 1999 Bay City Classic (Bay City, Michigan)
7. **1999 Brunswick World Tournament of Champions** (Overland Park, Kansas)
8. **2000 Brunswick World Tournament of Champions** (Lake Zurich, Illinois)
9. 2001 The Villages PBA Open (The Villages, Florida)
10. **2002 PBA Tournament of Champions at Mohegan Sun** (Uncasville, Connecticut)
11. 2003 PBA Pepsi Open (Grand Rapids, Michigan)
12. 2005 Chicago Classic (Vernon Hills, Illinois)
13. 2006 Dick Weber Open (Fountain Valley, California)
14. 2007 Dick Weber Open (Fountain Valley, California)
15. 2007 Motel 6 Classic (Henderson, Nevada)
16. 2011 Mark Roth Plastic Ball Championship (Cheektowaga, New York)

=== PBA50 Tour titles ===
1. 2021 Johnny Petraglia BVL Open (Clearwater, Florida)
2. 2024 Hamtramck Singles Classic Open (Westland, Michigan)
3. 2025 PBA50 Ballard Championship (Jackson, Michigan)
4. 2026 PBA50 Monacelli Championship (Lakeville, Minnesota)

== Awards and recognition ==
- 1992 PBA Rookie of the Year
- Won at least one PBA title in six straight seasons (1998 through 2003-04)
- One of only three players to win the Tournament of Champions at least three times (with Mike Durbin and Jason Belmonte), and the only one to win three consecutive TOC events
- Elected to the PBA Hall of Fame in 2012
- Elected to the United States Bowling Congress Hall of Fame in 2013
- Ranked #24 on the PBA's 2008 "50 Best Players of the Last 50 Years" poll
- Ranked #19 on the PBA's 2025 "Best 25 PBA Players of the Last 25 Seasons" list

== Sources ==
- PBA.com, official site of the Professional Bowlers Association
- , official Jason Couch fan site
