= Peter Murray (American businessman) =

American businessperson

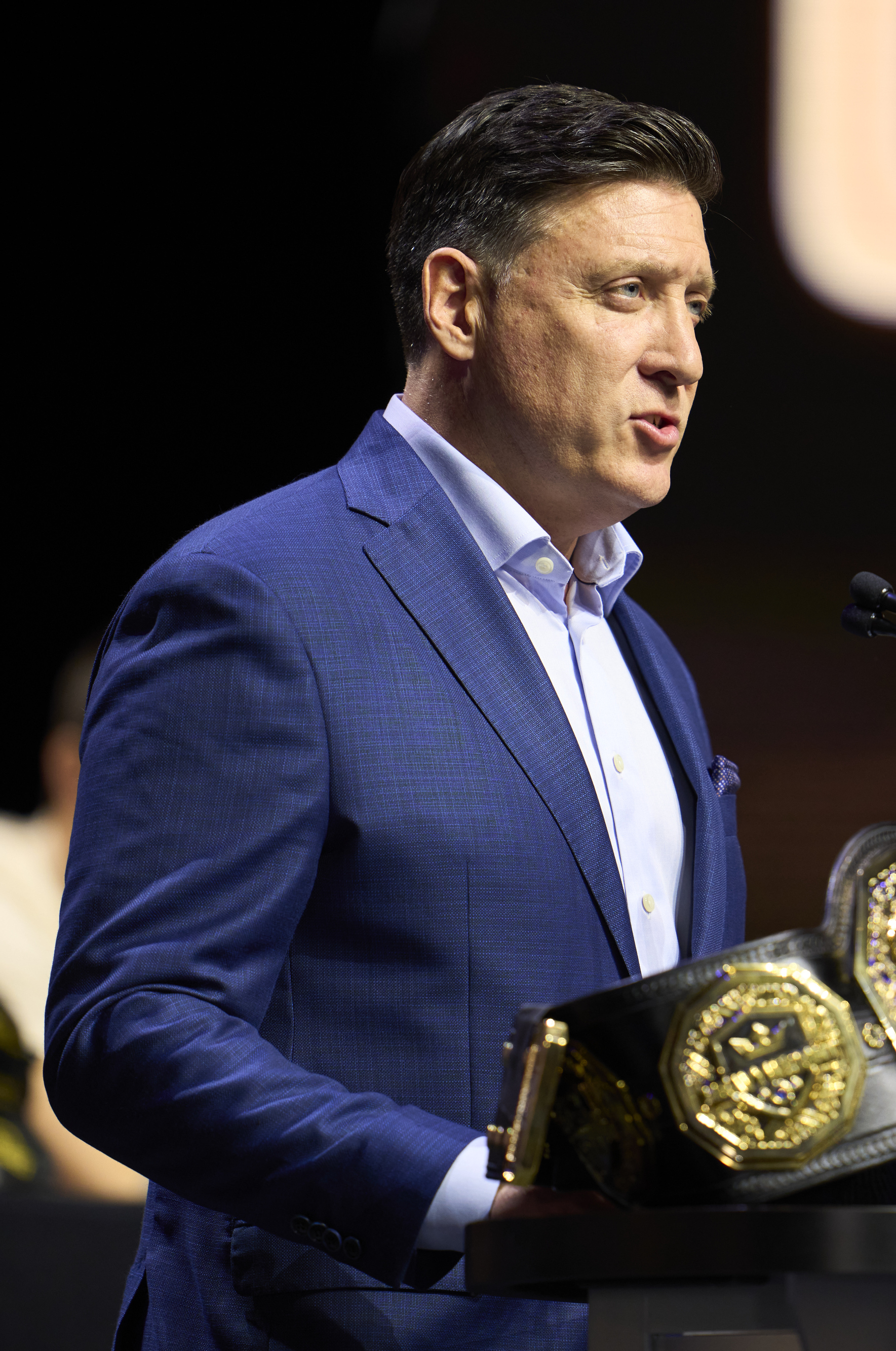
- Murray in 2021
- Born: October 1, 1967 (age 58); Bronx, New York City, New York, U.S
- Employer(s): Professional Fighters League; Professional Bowlers Association
- Title: CEO

Peter Murray (b. October 1, 1967 in The Bronx, New York) is an American sports business executive, best known for being the chief executive officer (CEO) of the Professional Fighters League. He is currently CEO and Head of Media for the Professional Bowlers Association (PBA).

== Career ==
After college, Murray decided to pursue a career in marketing, working at advertising firms Young & Rubicam and Bates USA. In 1995, Murray joined the National Football League, eventually becoming SVP of business and content development and SVP of global brand partnerships. In 2009, he left the NFL to join talent agency William Morris Endeavor as EVP of marketing & new business.

In 2012, Murray left to co-found sports marketing firm Insignia Sports, where he served as CEO. In 2014, Murray left the agency, which was sold to RSE Ventures, a private investment fund run by Miami Dolphins owner Stephen Ross and former New York Jets executive Matt Higgins. Murray went to sports apparel company Under Armour, after being recruited by CEO Kevin Plank, where he became the brand’s first VP of global brand and sports marketing. At Under Armour, Murray was responsible for signing deals with Stephen Curry and Clayton Kershaw.

In January 2018, Murray was appointed CEO of the Professional Fighters League. Since his appointment, he has increased the audience and viewership of PFL and signed brand partnerships with companies like Anheuser-Busch, Geico, DraftKings, and the US Marines and with streaming partnerships with ESPN and NBC Sports Group.

On January 28, 2026, the Professional Bowlers Association (PBA) and its parent company Lucky Strike Entertainment Corporation announced that Murray had been hired as of CEO and Head of Media for the PBA.

== Personal life ==
Murray was born in the Bronx, New York.
