= PBA Tour =

Professional tour for ten-pin bowling

- Current season, competition or edition: 2026 PBA Tour season
- Sport: Tenpin bowling
- First season: 1958
- Owner: Lucky Strike Entertainment
- CEO: Peter Murray
- Commissioner: Tom Clark
- Organizing body: Professional Bowlers Association
- Country: United States; Japan
- Headquarters: Mechanicsville, Virginia
- Most recent champion: E. J. Tackett (2025)
- Most titles: Walter Ray Williams Jr.
- Broadcasters: CW Sports; CBS Sports
- Related competitions: Round1 Japan Cup; Weber Cup
- Website: pba.com

The PBA Tour is the major professional tour for tenpin bowling, operated by the Professional Bowlers Association (PBA). Headquartered in Mechanicsville, Virginia, over 3,000 members worldwide make up the PBA. While most of the PBA members are Regional professionals, a small percentage of the bowling membership competes at the national and international level, forming the PBA Tour. (PBA.com lists 83 bowlers that have Tier 1 national touring pro status for the 2026 season.) Founded in 1958, the PBA Tour has been in continuous operation since the inaugural 1959 season.

Each year, the PBA Tour puts on a series of events for PBA members. Most events are held across the United States, with the PBA co-sponsoring selected international events as part of the World Bowling Tour (WBT). In addition, the PBA Tour has co-hosted the Round1 Japan Cup along with the Japan Professional Bowling Association (JPBA). Also, select American members compete against their European counterparts in the Weber Cup.

In September 2019, the PBA and PBA Tour were purchased by Bowlero Corporation (renamed Lucky Strike Entertainment Corporation in 2024). Tom Clark, who was promoted to PBA Commissioner in late 2011, retained that role even after the acquisition by Bowlero. In 2026, Lucky Strike Entertainment named Peter Murray to the position of CEO and Head of Media for the PBA.

== Major championships ==
The PBA Tour has five events that have been considered major tournaments over the history of the organization:

- The USBC Masters
- The PBA World Championship
- The PBA Tournament of Champions
- The U.S. Open
- The PBA Players Championship

=== USBC Masters ===
Current defending champion: David Krol

- Originally the American Bowling Congress (ABC) Masters, the first Masters champion was Lee Jouglard with his win in the inaugural 1951 event. After the 2005 merger of the ABC and WIBC, this event was renamed the USBC Masters.
- The USBC Masters became an officially sanctioned PBA event in 1998.
- Entrants for the USBC Masters can qualify via sanctioned USBC league play and are not required to be PBA members. Winners do, however, have to be full-fledged PBA members to be credited with a PBA title.
- In May 2008, the PBA announced that it was revising its all-time records to include ABC Masters wins in the PBA era prior to 1998 as PBA major titles, if the person who earned the title was a PBA member at the time. One notable result of this change is that Earl Anthony's long-standing 41 career titles count was increased to 43, as he had won the 1977 and 1984 Masters events. This also retroactively credited Jason Queen as having bowled the 11th perfect game in a televised PBA Tour event, which he accomplished at the 1997 Masters.
- PBA Hall of Famer Ernie Schlegel became the oldest player to win a PBA Tour major, winning the 1996 ABC Masters at age 53, although the event was not considered a major at the time of his victory. Buzz Fazio was previously the oldest player to ever win a Masters title, when he won the 1955 event at age 47.
- The televised final round for the 2004 Masters was held at Miller Park, home of Major League Baseball's Milwaukee Brewers. Danny Wiseman won the title in front of over 4,000 fans.
- Walter Ray Williams Jr. won a memorable 2009–10 Masters at age 50, firing a 290 game in the final to defeat Chris Barnes. The win sealed Williams's record seventh PBA Player of the Year award, making him the oldest POY winner in PBA history.
- With victories in both the 2013 and 2014 tournaments, Jason Belmonte became the first person to win back-to-back USBC Masters titles since Billy Welu in 1964–65. Anthony Simonsen has since repeated this achievement in 2022–23. On February 8, 2015, Belmonte became the first player in history to win three consecutive USBC Masters championships. Mike Aulby and Simonsen are the only other players to win three Masters titles, but their wins were not in consecutive seasons.
- Jason Belmonte holds the most USBC Masters wins at four (2013, 2014, 2015, and 2017).
- Anthony Simonsen won the 2016 USBC Masters, becoming the youngest person (19 years, 39 days) to ever win a PBA major. That distinction previously belonged to Mike Aulby, who won the 1979 PBA National Championship at age 19 years, 83 days.

=== PBA World Championship ===
Current defending champion: E. J. Tackett

- Originally the PBA National Championship, this event was renamed the PBA World Championship in 2002–03.
- The PBA World Championship is a PBA members-only event.
- Don Carter won the inaugural National Championship in 1960 in Memphis, TN, defeating Ronnie Gaudern.
- Hall of Famer Wayne Zahn became the first bowler to win this event twice (1966 and 1968), defeating Nelson Burton Jr. both times.
- Earl Anthony staked his mastery in this event; twice capturing it three straight years (1973–75; 1981–83). His 1983 victory was his 41st title (under PBA rules at the time), a record that would stand until Walter Ray Williams Jr. broke it in 2006–07.
- Fellow Hall of Famer Mike Aulby won this event in 1979, the first of his 29 PBA titles. Ironically, he had to defeat Anthony to win.
- The following year, Johnny Petraglia won the final of his 14 titles at the Sterling Heights, MI event. Petraglia became the second bowler to win bowling's original "Triple Crown" with this victory (after Billy Hardwick).
- A memorable 1994 PBA National featured brothers David Traber and Dale Traber squaring off in the final match, with David emerging victorious.
- With his runner-up finish in the February 2008 event, Ryan Shafer set a record with his fourth runner-up finish in a PBA major event without a victory. Overall, Shafer has made the TV finals in a PBA major event 16 times and has yet to win.
- The event moved from late season to become the season-opening tournament in 2008–09, meaning there were two World Championships during calendar year 2008.
- With his victory in the November 2008 World Championship, Norm Duke became the first PBA bowler to win three consecutive majors.
- The event was moved again for the 2009–10 season. In a split-format, the qualifying for the championship was held at the inaugural PBA World Series of Bowling in early September 2009, and the TV finals aired live from Wichita, KS on December 13, 2009. In the feel-good story of the season, recently laid-off auto worker Tom Smallwood won the 2009 event.
- Earl Anthony holds the most World Championship victories (called the PBA National Championship at the time), winning the tournament an unprecedented six times, which is also the most wins by a player in any single major. The runner-up in PBA World Championship wins is E. J. Tackett, who won his fifth in 2026.
- Jason Belmonte won the 2019 PBA World Championship for his record-setting 11th career major championship, surpassing Earl Anthony and Pete Weber, who each have ten majors.
- Jason Belmonte won three consecutive PBA World Championships in 2017, 2019, and 2020 (the PBA World Championship was not held in the 2018 calendar year), being the second bowler to accomplish this feat, following Anthony. E. J. Tackett would duplicate the feat with his wins in 2023, 2024 and 2025.
- With his win in the 2026 event, E. J. Tackett became the first player ever to win a PBA major in four consecutive seasons and, in fact, the only player to win any PBA Tour event four consecutive times.

=== PBA Tournament of Champions ===
Current defending champion: Alex Horton

- The Tournament of Champions has had many sponsors over the years; most notably the Firestone Tire and Rubber Company from 1962 to 1993. It is the only PBA major tournament that is not open to all PBA members; the starting field only includes a set number of players who won a recent PBA title or (currently) past winners of the TOC event itself.
- Hall of Famer Joe Joseph captured the first Tournament of Champions crown in 1962. The starting field for that event featured all 25 PBA Tour title winners since the organization's inaugural 1959 event.
- Billy Hardwick won the second Tournament of Champions in 1965, besting finalists Dick Weber and Joe Joseph in a two-game set, 484–468–404. This was the first tourney in PBA history to offer a six-figure prize fund, along with a then-record $25,000 first prize (about $265,000 in 2026 dollars). Following this season, the Tournament of Champions became an annual event.
- Mike Durbin (1972, 1982, and 1984), and Jason Couch (1999, 2000, and 2002) each hold three wins in the Tournament of Champions. Jason Couch's victories came in three consecutive Tournament of Champions (the event was not held in 2001). Jason Belmonte surpassed both with his fourth Tournament of Champions title in 2023, having previously won in 2014, 2015 and 2019.
- Jack Biondolillo rolled the PBA's first-ever televised 300 game in the 1967 Tournament of Champions final round.
- George Pappas became the first bowler to lead a major tournament wire-to-wire (from opening game of qualifying to championship match) when he won the 1979 event.
- The 1981 edition saw the only double two-frame roll-off in championship round history, with Pete Couture finally emerging victorious over Earl Anthony in the second roll-off. Steve Cook won the championship with a memorable 287 game over Couture, gaining the first ten strikes before leaving the 6–7 split.
- Kelly Kulick's win in 2010 made her the first woman ever to win any event on the PBA Tour that was also open to men.
- The 2011 Tournament of Champions featured a $1 million purse and a $250,000 first prize (won by Mika Koivuniemi over Tom Smallwood), making it the richest PBA tournament ever. This event also featured the lowest score ever bowled in a televised PBA event (100, by Tom Daugherty) and the largest pin differential in a PBA final round match, with Koivuniemi defeating Daugherty 299–100 in the semifinal game.
- Pete Weber's victory in the 2013 event made him the oldest player (50 years, 7 months, 10 days) to win the Tournament of Champions, and the only player to win each event of the PBA's Triple Crown at least twice in a career.
- Jesper Svensson of Sweden became the youngest Tournament of Champions winner, capturing the title in the 2016 event at age 20 years, 357 days. This distinction previously belonged to Marshall Holman, who won the 1976 ToC at age 21.
- In 2026, Alex Horton became the fourth rookie and the fourth black bowler to win a major PBA title.

=== U.S. Open ===
Current defending champion: Patrick Dombrowski

- The origins of the U.S. Open pre-date the PBA's founding by more than a decade, starting in the 1940s. Originally associated with the Bowling Proprietors Association of America (BPAA) it was known as the BPAA All Star from 1951 to 1970. It was renamed the BPAA United States Open in 1971, and shortened to U.S. Open thereafter. It has been held every year since, except for 1997 and 2014.
- Like the USBC Masters, the U.S. Open allows amateur bowlers to participate as well as professionals. However, winners must be full-fledged PBA members to be credited with a PBA title.
- The U.S. Open is considered the most difficult of the tournaments bowl in today, due to its long format and demanding oil pattern, which differs from the oil patterns the PBA generally employs. According to PBA.com, the U.S. Open uses a "flat" oil pattern, with equal amounts of oil being applied to every board. (Normal lane conditions feature a "crown" or larger amount of oil over the middle lane boards, to handle the heavier ball traffic.)
- Don Carter dominated the early BPAA All-Star events, winning four times between 1953 and 1958. Dick Weber also won this tournament four times when it was the BPAA All-Star (1962, 1963, 1965 and 1966). Because Weber's wins were all during the PBA era (after 1959), he was retroactively credited with PBA major titles for all four due to a PBA rule change in 2008.
- Mike Limongello won the first modern-day U.S. Open in 1971, defeating Teata Semiz.
- Marshall Holman became the first multiple modern-day winner with victories in 1981 and 1985.
- The purse for the 1987 event, sponsored by Seagram Wine Coolers, was a then-record $500,000, with a record $100,000 going to the eventual winner, Del Ballard Jr.
- The final round of the 1995 event, at Joe Louis Arena in Detroit, set a bowling attendance record with 7,212 watching Dave Husted notch the second of his three U.S. Open Crowns. Husted was also the last person to successfully defend a U.S. Open championship, winning again in 1996.
- Pete Weber holds the record for most victories in the U.S. Open, capturing the title five times (1988, 1991, 2004, 2007, and 2012). He is also the only player to win a U.S. Open championship in four different decades.
- Earl Anthony, who is tied with Pete Weber for the second most PBA major titles (10), never captured the U.S. Open despite runner-up finishes in 1973, 1979 and 1980.
- Norm Duke's victory in the 2008 U.S. Open made him the fifth Triple Crown winner (and second "grand slam" winner) in PBA history.
- The 2014 event was cancelled due to lack of sponsorship and conflicts with the PBA's schedule. The 2015 tournament was originally cancelled as well, but a deal was struck to keep the tournament on the schedule for 2015, 2016, and 2017. Since 2015, the U.S. Open has been jointly run by the USBC and BPAA.
- Canadian François Lavoie bowled the first televised 300 game ever in a U.S. Open in the semifinal match of the 2016 event. This match was Lavoie's television debut during his rookie season in the PBA. He would go on to win in the title match against Marshall Kent to capture his first PBA title, helping him win the 2016 PBA Harry Golden Rookie of the Year award.
- Jason Belmonte's 2020 U.S. Open win made him the PBA's second Super Slam, third Grand Slam, and seventh Triple Crown winner.
- Should he collect another U.S. Open title, Jason Belmonte would become the second player in PBA history to win two Triple Crowns in his career (winning the World Championship, Tournament of Champions and the U.S. Open at least twice each; Pete Weber was the first and only player to do so); he would also accomplish an unprecedented double Super Slam title, which has never been done in PBA history.

=== PBA Players Championship ===
Current defending champion: Brandon Bonta

- Unlike the US Open and USBC Masters, which allow qualifying amateurs to participate, the PBA Players Championship is open to PBA members only.
- The tournament, originally called the PBA Touring Players Championship, was first held in 1983 and would be held every season through 2000. The event would not be held during the 2001 through 2010 seasons. The event, now called the PBA Players Championship, would return as a non-major event in 2011, 2013, and 2015. The Players Championship would return to major status in 2016, and has been held every season since. Jason Belmonte, Scott Norton, and Parker Bohn III were retroactively awarded major titles in 2016 for their wins in 2011, 2013, and 2015, respectively.
- PBA Hall of Famer Steve Cook won the first PBA Touring Players Championship in 1983.
- Mike Aulby's victory in the 1996 PBA Touring Players Championship allowed him to become the first bowler in PBA history to win the PBA career "Super Slam" (all five majors).
- Graham Fach's victory in the 2016 PBA Players Championship made him the first Canadian bowler to win a PBA Tour title.
- With his victory in the 2019 PBA Players Championship, Anthony Simonsen became the youngest bowler to win two major titles (22 years, 11 days).
- Dave Ferraro (1988 and 1991), Steve Hoskins (1997 and 1999), Dennis Horan Jr. (1998 and 2000), Jason Belmonte (2011, 2017, and 2022), and Bill O'Neill (2020 and 2024) all hold multiple victories in the Players Championship; Belmonte is the only player in PBA history to win this event three times.
- The revamped 2021 PBA Players Championship was initially held in five regions around the US, with the five regional winners then competing in the February 21 televised finals. Kyle Troup won the title and record-tying $250,000 first prize.
- Jason Belmonte's 2022 victory made him the first player in PBA history to win four different majors each on three separate occasions (2013-15 Masters; '14, '15, and '19 T.o.C.; '17, '19, and '20 World Championship; '11, '17, and '22 Players Championship).
- When Kevin McCune won the 2023 Players Championship, it made the McCune family (with Kevin's father Eugene McCune and grandfather Don McCune) the first three-generation family of PBA Tour title holders.

=== Triple Crown ===
The three "original" major championships (PBA World Championship, Tournament of Champions and U.S. Open) make up the PBA's "Triple Crown."

Only nine bowlers in the history of the PBA have won all three jewels of the Triple Crown in their careers (year triple crown achieved in parentheses):

- Billy Hardwick (1969)
- Johnny Petraglia (1980)
- Pete Weber (1989)
- Mike Aulby (1995)
- Norm Duke (2008)
- Chris Barnes (2010)
- Jason Belmonte (2020)
- Dom Barrett (2022)
- E. J. Tackett (2023)

Of the nine, Pete Weber is the only player to have won each Triple Crown event at least twice in his career (five U.S. Opens, two PBA World Championships, and two Tournament of Champions titles). Despite 47 and 43 titles respectively, Walter Ray Williams and Earl Anthony are not Triple Crown winners. As mentioned, Anthony never won the U.S. Open, though he finished runner-up in the event three times. Williams has never won the Tournament of Champions, but he has a runner-up finish there.

=== Grand slam ===
Mike Aulby, Norm Duke, and Jason Belmonte are the three of the nine PBA "Triple Crown" winners who have also won the ABC/USBC Masters, thus giving them the unofficial "grand slam" of pro bowling.

Don Carter is also noted for having won all four possible "majors" during his career (PBA National Championship, BPAA All-Star, World Invitational and ABC Masters), however some of these were not PBA events.

=== Super slam ===
Mike Aulby and Jason Belmonte are the only bowlers to have won the PBA "super slam", which includes a win in all four "grand slam" events in addition to a PBA Players Championship title (known as the Touring Players Championship at the time of Aulby's win).

=== Threepeats in majors ===
The following players have all won the same major event at least three consecutive times. E. J. Tackett has the only four-peat in the group, winning the PBA World Championship from 2023 through 2026. Jason Belmonte is the only player to have earned a three-peat in two different major events.

1. Earl Anthony: PBA National Championship (1973, 1974, 1975)
2. Earl Anthony: PBA National Championship (1981, 1982, 1983)
3. Jason Couch: PBA Tournament of Champions (1999, 2000, 2002) (not contested in 2001)
4. Jason Belmonte: USBC Masters (2013, 2014, 2015)
5. Jason Belmonte: PBA World Championship (2017, 2019, 2020) (not contested in 2018)
6. E. J. Tackett: PBA World Championship (2023, 2024, 2025, 2026)

== Qualifying ==
From the PBA Tour's inception through the 2003–04 season, most national PBA Tour events were open to the entire PBA membership. The initial tournament squads typically included well over 100 bowlers, who would bowl a set number of qualifying games to determine the "cut line" for additional qualifying and/or match play (typically 64 bowlers).

=== All-exempt format (2004–2012) ===
Starting in October 2004, the PBA adopted an all-exempt national tour format. In this format, only 64 bowlers competed in most weekly events. Bowlers earned exemptions by winning a tournament during the previous season, winning one of the four major tournaments (thus gaining a multi-year exemption), placing among the top finishers in points, leading a region on the PBA Regional Tour (2005–2007), finishing in a high position at the PBA Tour Trials (2005–2008), or placing high enough at the PBA Regional Players Invitational Tournament (2008–2011).

Under this new format, bona fide status as a touring professional was not a guarantee; it had to be earned. The 2005 H&R Block Tournament of Champions was pivotal, as Randy Pedersen was facing the loss of his exempt status in the semi-final match against Norm Duke. On his final shot, Pedersen left a weak 7-pin and immediately singled out the sidelines, accusing a spectator of distracting him as he made his shot. From that point, Pedersen would have to bowl in the Tour Qualifying Round (TQR) in order to try making the initial field of 64.

Criticism of the format was brought forth by long-time PBA fans when popular 24-time winner Brian Voss lost his tour exemption following the 2006–07 season. 19-time titlist Amleto Monacelli also lost his exemption at the same time.

Depending on the season, a set number of bowlers (for example, 58 bowlers in the 2008–09 season) earned exemptions which automatically placed them in the starting field of 64 bowlers each week. The remaining spots needed to bring the field to 64 were awarded each week through the PBA Tour Qualifying Round (TQR), also called the "rabbit squad". PBA Commissioner Fred Schreyer would often award one spot in the field to a former touring pro under the Commissioner's Exemption, meaning even fewer spots were available via the TQR. For example, PBA Hall of Famer and Medford, Oregon resident Marshall Holman competed on a Commissioner's Exemption at the Bayer Earl Anthony Medford Classic held in that city in January 2009.

During the TQR, amateur and non-exempt PBA bowlers bowled 7 games of qualifying. The top amateur bowler advanced (no matter where he or she finished), along with the top-scoring PBA members needed to round out the field. In the 2007–08 PBA season, rookie Rhino Page made a remarkable five TV finals appearances (winning one title) despite having to bowl in the TQR every week.

==== PBA Tour Trials (2005–2008) ====
From 2005 to 2008, the PBA held the PBA Tour Trials in late May/early June to determine the bowlers who would will fill the remaining open spots on the following season's exempt player list. The number of exemptions awarded at the PBA Tour Trials varied—10 spots were available in 2006–07, but only seven spots at the start of the 2007–08 and 2008–09 campaigns. That number could increase or decrease due to injury deferments for currently exempt bowlers. At the Tour Trials, non-exempt PBA and international bowlers bowled nine games each day for five straight days on the five primary PBA oil patterns. (See "PBA Tour lane preparation" later in this article.)

At the 2006 Denny's PBA Tour Trials, Kelly Kulick made history by becoming the first woman to ever gain a PBA exemption (she was exempt for the 2006–07 season). (Before it dissolved, Kulick was the 2001 Rookie of the Year on the PWBA, won the 2003 U.S. Women's Open, and was a three-time member of Team USA.) Kulick later earned a two-year exemption to the main PBA Tour with her victory in the 2010 Tournament of Champions; she had earned her spot in that event by winning the PBA Women's World Championship, the tour's first major championship in its Women's Series.

==== PBA Regional Players Invitational (2009–2011) ====
From 2009 to 2011, the Tour Trials were replaced by the PBA Regional Players Invitational (RPI). For the 2010–11 and 2011–12 seasons, the top eight finishers at the RPI were offered PBA Tour exemptions, though not all of them accepted. At the 2011 RPI, 58-year-old Kerry Painter finished eighth and made history by becoming the oldest player to ever earn a PBA Tour exemption.

=== 2012 and later ===
In November 2011, the PBA announced that they would discontinue the exempt tour format for the 2012–13 PBA Tour season. Due to the changing climate of the Tour itself, the number of all-exempt events had been steadily declining in the 2009–10 and 2010–11 seasons, until there were only three exempt events for the 2011–12 season. This change meant that all but two events during the 2012–13 PBA national tour were open to all players.

The two notable exceptions to the open policy are the PBA Tournament of Champions (TOC) and the Round1 Japan Cup. The TOC accepts only the most recent 48 PBA Tour titlists (with a "Touring 1" or "Touring 2" status), plus past winners of the TOC itself. The Japan Cup invites the top sixteen PBA Tour bowlers (based on final points standing of the previous season), and four at-large PBA Tour players selected by the tournament committee.

While the "exempt player" designation was removed, the PBA announced that players would be able to earn "Touring 1" and "Touring 2" statuses, which will offer certain benefits and bonuses. "Touring 1" status is awarded to all bowlers who enter at least 80 percent of a season's tournaments, including the World Series of Bowling, at least two majors, and at least three PBA Xtra Frame events. "Touring 2" status is awarded for players entering at least 60 percent of a season's tournaments, including the World Series, at least one major, and at least one Xtra Frame event. To earn either status, players must also average 190 or higher in PBA Tour events.

While the PBA points list no longer affects exempt status, there are incentives for finishing high on the list — such as eligibility for certain tournaments like the PBA Players Championship (begun in 2011–12), PBA Tour Finals (begun in 2017) and PBA Playoffs (begun in 2019).

== Tournament formats ==
Prior to the debut of the PBA on ABC television in 1962, most tournaments were organized where, once the cut was established after qualifying rounds, a set number of match-play games were bowled, and bonus pins were given to the winner of each match. The champion was then decided based on the final overall total pinfall.

From 1962 to 1965, ABC started televising the PBA Tour, starting with a limited number of tournaments on ABC's Wide World of Sports, and later having its own timeslot. Therefore, a round-robin tournament format was implemented to determine the champion. The televised finals would be cut to the top four bowlers after match-play, and then three round-robin matches between the fourth, third and second-seeded bowlers would determine the final two bowlers. If any bowler were to win both of his matches in the round-robin, he would go on to face the tournament leader. If the three bowlers each split their matches to go 1 and 1 in the round-robin, total pinfall would decide which man would advance to the final match to face the tournament leader. The winner of the final match would win the tournament.

From the late 1960s to 1997 (with the exception of one year), televised events were done in a "stepladder" format. Four matches would be held, with the #5 and #4 seeds from the qualifying rounds meeting first. The winner of the first match would bowl the #3 seed, and likewise up to the top spot.

=== 1990s ===
ABC experimented in 1993 with a King Of The Hill format. Under this arrangement, only the top four seeds made it to the television finals, instead of five, with the traditional stepladder format. The #4 and #3 seeds met first, with the winner facing the #2 seed, and that winner then facing the #1 seed. The winner of the tournament faced the current "King" for an additional cash prize. The winner of the King of the Hill match would then bowl the winner of the following week's tournament. The "King" could defend his title even when not competing in the event hosting it. The tour resumed its normal "stepladder" format the following year.

The bowler who won himself the most notoriety for winning "King" matches was Ron Williams, who won only four tourneys in his career, yet held the "King" spot for five consecutive weeks that year.

Special formats were also used on occasion in conjunction with Old Spice deodorant, which sponsored a Winning Never Gets Old challenge annually in the mid-1990s. The winner of the championship would bowl a Seniors Tour bowler for the rights to an extra $10,000.

When the PBA Tour moved to CBS in 1998, a two-match format was adopted. Again going to four bowlers, the #2, #3, and #4 players bowled in one "shootout" match, with the winner facing the tournament's #1 qualifier for the championship. From 1998 to 2000, also, the PBA used gold-colored pins with black stripes or crowns (depending on if Brunswick or AMF was involved in the alley) for their televised finals. The pins returned to regular white in 2001.

=== 2000s ===
After the PBA's sale and move of broadcasts to ESPN, most tournaments used a "bracketed" format. Each bowler bowled nine qualifying games, with the top 64 by pinfall competing in best 4-of-7 head-to-head matches. The four remaining bowlers from match play competed in two semi-final matches (#4 seed vs. #1 seed, and #3 seed vs. #2 seed), followed by a final match of the semi-final winners. A few tournaments still used the stepladder format for the finals.

In January 2005, the PBA tournament format was modified because of the all exempt tour. Non-exempt bowlers bowled on the first day to determine the additional six (or more) bowlers who qualify for the tournament (on top of the exempt field). The second day consisted of 64 bowlers rolling 14 games (two 7-game blocks) to determine the 32 bowlers who made "match play" on the third day. Seeding of the top 32 was based on a rolling points list of the 20 previous events.

The third day featured 32 bowlers competing in potentially 21 matches in a single day. It started with the first round in the morning, followed by the second round ("Round of 16") after lunch. That night, the quarterfinal ("Round of 8") matches were conducted. All matches were a best 4-of-7 format. The four quarterfinal winners made the field for the televised finals. Depending on the finals format, a fifth bowler could be added based on highest pinfall among the quarterfinal non-winners.

The championship round remained single head-to-head matches for semifinals and finals on the final day.

=== 2009 and later ===
==== 2009–10 season ====
Beginning in the 2009–10 season, a majority of the finals had returned to the stepladder format. When the PBA Tour introduced the World Series of Bowling during the 2009–10 season, the televised finals for all tournaments in the series used the four-man bracket format. It was changed to a five-man stepladder for the 2010–11 season. During the 2011 WSOB, an "eliminator" format was used. The top four qualifiers all bowled together, and the top three scorers would move on to the next match, with the lowest score finishing in fourth place. The next match would then take the two top scorers (low score finishing in third place), and these two bowlers competed head-to-head in the final match. For the 2012-13 "Super Season", the WSOB switched back to the four-man stepladder format, with the exception of the PBA World Championship which featured a five-man stepladder final. The format has changed multiple times since then.

For the first five exempt events of the 2009–10 season, the starting field consisted of 72 bowlers all rolling 14 games of qualifying in one day (two blocks of 7 games each) to determine the top 28. The top four bowlers by pinfall automatically earned a spot in the Round of 16 match play. The other 12 spots for the Round of 16 were determined in a separate match play round for the #5 through #28 seeds. The eight winners from the Round of 16 match play then bowled a final match play round to determine the four bowlers who advanced to the TV finals.

All match play rounds were on the second day of the tournament, and all were best 4-of-7 matches.

In a cost-cutting effort, the PBA split the 2009–10 season into two segments. The first, the 2009 World Series of Bowling, consisted of seven PBA Tour events—including one major tournament (PBA World Championship) – held in August and September 2009 in Allen Park, MI, near Detroit. All of the events ran in a split format: the early rounds of each tournament were held on consecutive days in August and September, and ESPN television taped the final rounds for the tournaments on Labor Day weekend (September 5–7). These were aired on seven Sundays, October 25 through December 6, 2009.

The final rounds for the Women's and Senior PBA World Championship were taped September 5 and were broadcast on October 25. The final round for the "open" PBA World Championship was broadcast live on December 13.

The Motor City Open and PBA World Championship were open to the entire PBA membership. The fields for the five exempt events were increased from 64 to 72, with the additional spots going to TQR qualifiers and the new "Golden Parachute" entry reserved for a formerly-exempt player. Under the Golden Parachute rule, any formerly exempt PBA member who lost his/her exemption during past four years was able to apply for this new exempt position. (It was awarded to 24-time PBA titlist Brian Voss.) Following the 2009–10 season, the Golden Parachute exemption will come only from the previous year's crop of players who lose their exemption due to points.

The exempt PBA Women's Series fields were increased from 16 to 20. The Women's Series added qualifiers for the exempt events to fill two of the four additional spots.

The second half of the season, running January–April 2010, consisted of 11 traditional touring weekly tournaments, including the remaining three majors. Each event ended with the live ESPN television finals on Sundays. The second half also included three special (non-title) televised events: the Chris Paul PBA Celebrity Invitational, the PBA Experience Showdown, and the PBA Women's Series Showdown.

==== 2010–11 season ====
The PBA announced in May, 2010 that it would again cover all of the Fall tournaments for the upcoming season at the World Series of Bowling. The second annual event was held October 24 through November 6, 2010 at South Point Hotel, Casino and Bowling Center in Las Vegas, Nevada. It consisted of five title events, qualifying for the PBA World Championship, and one non-title, made-for-TV event. Based on input from players, as well as corporate partner and ESPN television needs, there were some revisions to the series:

- All events were "open," meaning any PBA member could enter the entire World Series of Bowling via $750 entry fee. There were no Tour Qualifying Rounds or "World Series Trials."
- Over the first five days (starting October 25) all players bowled 12 games on each of the PBA's five "animal" oil patterns (Cheetah, Chameleon, Viper, Scorpion and Shark). The Top 16 qualifiers on each pattern advanced to a 9-game match play the following week. Top 5 qualifiers after the match play rounds in each event advanced to the televised stepladder finals, contested on November 5–6 and taped by ESPN for broadcasts on five consecutive Sundays, starting November 28.
- The standings after all 60 animal pattern qualifying games also determined the rankings for the PBA World Championship. The World Championship was again the first major and first live ESPN broadcast of the season, but this time it featured the Top 8 qualifiers bowling over three consecutive days (January 14–16, 2011).
- The Top 6 U.S. qualifiers and Top 6 International qualifiers after the 60 animal pattern games competed in a special (non-title) televised event called "USA vs. The World," which was taped on November 6 for a January 9, 2011 broadcast.

The format for the second half of the 2010–11 season included the remaining three majors (USBC Masters, Tournament of Champions and U.S. Open), as well as the first-ever Dick Weber PBA Playoffs. The 2011 Tournament of Champions had the largest prize fund ($1 million U.S.) and largest first-place prize ($250,000 U.S.) in PBA history.

==== 2011–12 season ====
The PBA announced in June 2011 that it would again cover all of the Fall tournaments for the upcoming season at the World Series of Bowling, and that the event would have a $1 million prize fund. The event was held November 4–20, 2011 and returned to the South Point Hotel, Casino and Bowling Center in Las Vegas, Nevada. It included both the qualifying and final rounds of the PBA World Championship, the first major tournament of the season.

The second half of the PBA Tour season includes the three remaining majors (USBC Masters, Lumber Liquidators U.S. Open and Tournament of Champions), plus four additional title events.

==== 2012–13 season ====
The PBA announced in June, 2012 that the 2012–13 PBA season would include an unprecedented 40 title events. The season began in November, 2012 with the 2012 World Series of Bowling and concluded with a second World Series of Bowling starting in November, 2013. There were 15 international stops on the 2012–13 tour, which are now counted as PBA titles if won by a full-fledged PBA member. The 14-month season was done in preparation for a return to a calendar year national tour format in 2014. The PBA had not had a calendar year format since the 2000 season. The PBA also abandoned its "exempt player" tour format prior to this season.

== Lane preparation ==
Unlike the typical "league condition" or "house shot", which facilitates a fairly consistent pattern and wider target area, the PBA rotates several challenging lane oil patterns throughout the season. The initial named patterns — known as Cheetah, Viper, Scorpion, Shark and Chameleon — feature varying oil volumes and lengths that require pros to adjust ball angle, rotation and speed accordingly. On some patterns, certain "strike lines" (areas of the lane) are unplayable, and spare shooting becomes much more important. This means a 220 average on the PBA Tour would easily translate to 20-30 pins higher on a typical league shot.

To put this theory to the test, the PBA held a special "Ultimate Scoring Championship" in the 2008–09 season, with pro bowlers competing on a typical league lane condition. The event took place November 9–11, 2008 in Taylor, Michigan, prior to the PBA Chameleon Championship that took place in the same bowling center. The lane conditions indeed proved easier for the professionals, as three of the four finalists averaged better than 250 during match play.

Custom oil patterns are used for the four major tournaments. In addition, the PBA introduced the Dick Weber pattern for two 2008–09 tournaments (including the Denny's Dick Weber Open), plus a newly designed "Earl" pattern for the Earl Anthony Medford Classic. Beginning in the 2018 season, the PBA began incorporating several more "legends" oil patterns (e.g., Mark Roth 42, Carmen Salvino 44, etc.) in addition to the Weber, Anthony and "animal" oil patterns.

Though most PBA pros tend to bowl their best on one or two of the PBA oil patterns, two players, Mika Koivuniemi and Tommy Jones, have managed to win at least one title on all five of the standard "animal" patterns.

The USBC is also grasping the PBA lane conditions. Called the USBC PBA Experience, amateurs are able to experience and test their bowling skills against PBA-like conditions, by participating in a USBC sanctioned league style called Sport Bowling.

For the 2013 World Series of Bowling and into the 2014 season, the PBA began using lane oil that is dyed blue for televised matches, thus helping viewers not only see the pattern layout but also see how the play area changes from game to game. Said ESPN Coordinating Producer Kathy Cook, "Until now, one of the most crucial and least understood aspects of the game was invisible."

The shortest pattern used in the 2019 PBA Tour season was the 32-foot Wolf pattern, and the longest was the 48-foot Shark pattern. The shortest pattern currently (2026) is the 35-foot Cheetah pattern, while the longest is the 50-foot Badger pattern.

== Player accomplishments ==
=== Most titles ===
The following are the top 28 players in history, by titles (those with at least 15 PBA Tour titles). Six of these players are still active on the PBA Tour: Jason Belmonte, E. J. Tackett, Anthony Simonsen, Tommy Jones, Sean Rash and Bill O'Neill.

Key
Active on PBA Tour
Retired or deceased member of PBA Hall of Fame
Active on PBA Tour & member of PBA Hall of Fame

Rank	Name	Titles
1	Walter Ray Williams Jr.	47
2	Earl Anthony	43
3	Norm Duke	40
4	Pete Weber	37
5	Parker Bohn III	35
6	Mark Roth	34
7	Jason Belmonte	32
8	Dick Weber	30
9	Mike Aulby	29
10	E. J. Tackett	28
11	Don Johnson	26
12	Brian Voss	25
13	Marshall Holman	22
14 (tie)	Tommy Jones	20
14 (tie)	Amleto Monacelli	20
14 (tie)	Dick Ritger	20
14 (tie)	Wayne Webb	20
18	Chris Barnes	19
19 (tie)	Nelson Burton Jr.	18
19 (tie)	Dave Davis	18
19 (tie)	Billy Hardwick	18
19 (tie)	Sean Rash	18
19 (tie)	Dave Soutar	18
24 (tie)	Carmen Salvino	17
24 (tie)	Anthony Simonsen	17
26	Jason Couch	16
27 (tie)	Steve Cook	15
27 (tie)	Bill O'Neill	15

In May 2008, the PBA announced that it was revising its all-time records to include United States Bowling Congress (USBC) Masters titles and Bowling Proprietors Association of America (BPAA) All-Star titles if they were bowled by a PBA member.

USBC Masters titles, which were previously known as the American Bowling Congress (ABC) Masters before 2005, that a member won prior to 1998 and BPAA All-Star titles, which were the precursor to the U.S. Open, won prior to 1971 were previously not counted as PBA titles. The events bowled in the PBA era (since 1959) are now counted as both a PBA title and a major title.

The most significant impact of this change is that Dick Weber moved from a 10th place tie on the all-time titles list (26 titles) to 8th place (30 titles) while picking up four majors (all won in BPAA All-Star events). Also, Earl Anthony is credited with two more major titles, both being ABC Masters, giving him ten majors among his 43 total titles. Pete Weber tied Anthony with ten major titles after his win in the 2013 PBA Tournament of Champions. Both players were surpassed by Jason Belmonte, who won his record 11th major title in 2019 and now owns 15 majors.

==== Father and son titlists ====
Dick Weber and Pete Weber became the first father-and-son combination to both win titles on the national PBA Tour, after Pete won the Greater Hartford Open on April 17, 1982. They are also the only father-and-son duo to both be ranked in the top ten all-time for PBA Tour titles (Dick earned 30 titles-eighth place and Pete has 37 titles-fourth place). They have since been joined by four other father-son titlists:

- Don Johnson (26 titles) and Jimmy Johnson (1 title in 1990)
- Don McCune (8 titles) and Eugene McCune (3 titles, first in 2002)
- Guppy Troup (8 titles) and Kyle Troup (12 titles, first in 2015)
- Eugene McCune (3 titles) and Kevin McCune (1 title in 2023)

Kevin McCune's victory at the 2023 PBA Players Championship made the McCune family the only one with three generations of PBA Tour title holders.

==== Sibling titlists ====
Nelson Burton Jr. (18 titles) and Neil Burton (1 title) were the first brothers to win at least one PBA Tour title each. Neil's title was in the 1980 ABC Masters, which was not considered a PBA title at the time. He was retroactively credited with a PBA Tour title and a major due to a 2008 PBA rule change. They were joined in 2026 when Raymond Teece of England won the Storm Lucky Larsen Masters. Raymond's brother Richie Teece had won the 2017 PBA Shark Championship.

=== Most wins in majors ===
Rank	Player	Total	Masters	WC/NC*	T of C	US/AS**	Players
1	Jason Belmonte	15	**4**	3	**4**	1	**3**
2	Earl Anthony	10	2	**6**	2	0	0
2	Pete Weber	10	0	2	2	**5**	1
4	Mike Aulby	8	3	2	1	1	1
4	Walter Ray Williams Jr.	8	2	3	0	2	1
4	E. J. Tackett	8	0	5	1	2	0
7	Norm Duke	7	1	3	1	2	0
8	Don Carter+	6	1	1	0	4	0
9	Anthony Simonsen	5	3	0	0	1	1
10	Del Ballard Jr.	4	1	0	1	2	0
10	Jason Couch	4	0	0	3	0	1
10	Dave Davis	4	0	2	2	0	0
10	Marshall Holman	4	0	0	2	2	0
10	Dave Husted	4	0	0	0	3	1
10	Doug Kent	4	2	2	0	0	0
10	Dick Weber	4	0	0	0	4	0

*WC/NC = PBA World Championship (2002–present) / PBA National Championship (until 2001–02)

**US/AS = U.S. Open (1971–present) / BPAA All Star (1951–70)

+ = Carter's total includes four BPAA All-Star wins earned before the PBA era.

Bold = denotes leader in individual major

=== Player of the Year ===
The PBA Player of the Year began being officially recognized in 1963. It was awarded by The Sporting News from 1963 to 1970, and by the PBA membership from 1971 to 2007. Some factors used in the voting process for a given season included major titles, total titles, Tour average ranking, points ranking, season earnings and championship finals appearances. In 1999, the award was officially renamed the Chris Schenkel PBA Player of the Year, in honor of the legendary broadcaster who covered bowling on national television for 35 years.

Billy Hardwick was the first bowler to be awarded an official PBA Player of the Year honor, and is also the youngest (22) to ever win the award. The mid-1970s to early-1980s were dominated by Earl Anthony and Mark Roth. The two won 10 of the 11 P.O.Y. awards between 1974 and 1984, and faced off in many memorable finals. Walter Ray Williams Jr. and Jason Belmonte have won the most P.O.Y. awards (7 each), one more than Anthony. Williams is also the oldest bowler to be named Player of the Year, earning the 2009–10 award at age 50.

In the 2007–08 season, a new Player of the Year system was instituted, where a points system only determined the winner. Chris Barnes became the first Player of the Year winner under this new system in 2008, edging out Walter Ray Williams Jr. by two points. The points-only system lasted just three seasons, and by the 2010–11 season, a player vote was again part of the process.

Five players have won the Player of the Year award in at least three consecutive seasons: Anthony (1974–1976, 1981–1983), Roth (1977–1979), Williams Jr. (1996–1998), Belmonte (2013–2015) and E. J. Tackett (2023–2026). Tackett is the only one of the five to win the award in four consecutive seasons.

=== By year ===
Season	Player
1963	(United States) Billy Hardwick
1964	(United States) Bob Strampe
1965	(United States) Dick Weber
1966	(United States) Wayne Zahn
1967	(United States) Dave Davis
1968	(United States) Jim Stefanich
1969	(United States) Billy Hardwick (2)
1970	(United States) Nelson Burton Jr.
1971	(United States) Don Johnson
1972	(United States) Don Johnson (2)
1973	(United States) Don McCune
1974	(United States) Earl Anthony
1975	(United States) Earl Anthony (2)
1976	(United States) Earl Anthony (3)
1977	(United States) Mark Roth
1978	(United States) Mark Roth (2)
1979	(United States) Mark Roth (3)
1980	(United States) Wayne Webb
1981	(United States) Earl Anthony (4)
1982	(United States) Earl Anthony (5)
1983	(United States) Earl Anthony (6)
1984	(United States) Mark Roth (4)
1985	(United States) Mike Aulby
1986	(United States) Walter Ray Williams Jr.
1987	(United States) Marshall Holman
1988	(United States) Brian Voss
1989	(Venezuela) Amleto Monacelli
1990	(Venezuela) Amleto Monacelli (2)
1991	(United States) David Ozio
1992	(United States) Dave Ferraro
1993	(United States) Walter Ray Williams Jr. (2)
1994	(United States) Norm Duke
1995	(United States) Mike Aulby (2)
1996	(United States) Walter Ray Williams Jr. (3)
1997	(United States) Walter Ray Williams Jr. (4)
1998	(United States) Walter Ray Williams Jr. (5)
1999	(United States) Parker Bohn III

=== By year (continued) ===
Season	Player
2000	(United States) Norm Duke (2)
2001–02	(United States) Parker Bohn III (2)
2002–03	(United States) Walter Ray Williams Jr. (6)
2003–04	(Finland) Mika Koivuniemi
2004–05	(United States) Patrick Allen
2005–06	(United States) Tommy Jones
2006–07	(United States) Doug Kent
2007-08	(United States) Chris Barnes
2008–09	(United States) Wes Malott
2009–10	(United States) Walter Ray Williams Jr. (7)
2010–11	(Finland) Mika Koivuniemi (2)
2011–12	(United States) Sean Rash
2012–13	(Australia) Jason Belmonte
2014	(Australia) Jason Belmonte (2)
2015	(Australia) Jason Belmonte (3)
2016	(United States) E. J. Tackett
2017	(Australia) Jason Belmonte (4)
2018	(United States) Andrew Anderson
2019	(Australia) Jason Belmonte (5)
2020	(Australia) Jason Belmonte (6)
2021	(United States) Kyle Troup
2022	(Australia) Jason Belmonte (7)
2023	(United States) E. J. Tackett (2)
2024	(United States) E. J. Tackett (3)
2025	(United States) E. J. Tackett (4)
2026	(United States) E. J. Tackett (5)

== Television coverage ==
The PBA provided its first televised event in 1962, and became a Saturday afternoon staple on the ABC schedule from 1965.

Years	Network	Play-by-play	Color commentary	Notes
1962–1974	ABC	Chris Schenkel	Billy Welu	Various announcers filled in whenever Schenkel was on assignment. Keith Jackson did play by play for the second televised 300 game in 1969, while Bud Palmer did the same for a 300 in 1974.
1974-75	ABC	Chris Schenkel	Dave Davis, Dick Weber	Davis and Weber alternated on telecasts after Welu's death in 1974.
1975–1997	ABC	Chris Schenkel	Nelson Burton Jr.	Burton Jr. was named Welu's permanent replacement in 1975. Dave Diles was Schenkel's fill-in while on assignment. Dick Weber filled in for Burton in the 1970s–1980s when Burton made the TV finals.
Late 1970s	HBO	Various	Various	Among the first sports broadcasts on HBO.
Late 1970s	CBS	Frank Glieber	Dave Davis	Part of the CBS Sports Spectacular summer series.
1981–1984	USA Network	Al Trautwig	Mike Durbin	Spring and Summer tour events.
1984–1991	NBC	Jay Randolph	Earl Anthony	Fall Tour Stops.
1985–1994	ESPN	Denny Schreiner	Mike Durbin	ESPN's first venture into bowling. Marshall Holman filled in for Durbin on occasion. Durbin later moved into the play-by-play role with Holman becoming the new analyst.
1998–1999	CBS	Gary Seidel	Marshall Holman	The "golden pin" era of the PBA. Chris Schenkel expressed interest in moving to CBS, but was passed over.
1999–2000	Fox Sports Net	Ron Thulin	Randy Pedersen	
2002–2007, 2014	ESPN	Dave Ryan	Randy Pedersen	Chris Barnes and Norm Duke would fill in as extra commentators during select telecasts. After a seven-year absence, Ryan returned to call some of the PBA telecasts in 2014, including all of the PBA Summer Swing events broadcast by CBS Sports Network. He is also the current TV announcer for the Professional Women's Bowling Association (PWBA) Tour on CBS Sports Network.
2007–2011	ESPN	Rob Stone	Randy Pedersen	Stone replaced Ryan at the start of the 2007–08 PBA season. Laneside reporters Cathy Dorin-Lizzi or Carolyn Dorin-Ballard were sometimes added when a PBA Women's Series event was included in the telecast. Laneside reporter Kimberly Pressler joined the PBA Tour coverage in 2010, making her debut at the World Series of Bowling.
2012–2013	ESPN	Lon McEachern	Randy Pedersen	Gary Thorne took over for Rob Stone at three live broadcasts in 2012 after Stone left for a new position at Fox Sports, but McEachern was named Stone's permanent replacement for the 2012–13 season.
2013–2016	ESPN	Mike Jakubowski	Randy Pedersen	Mike Jakubowski, Cross-Marketing and Multimedia Specialist for the PBA and Public Address Announcer at Marquette University, took over for McEachern starting with the 2013 World Series of Bowling in Las Vegas. Jakubowski had previously done some play-by-play during the 2010 PBA Summer Series at Six Flags Great Adventure Amusement Park in New Jersey, and also did play-by-play for the PBA's Xtra Frame webcast service.
2016–2018	ESPN, CBS Sports	Dave LaMont, Dave Ryan	Randy Pedersen	Kimberly Pressler continued as laneside reporter with Dennis McKendree added as the MC for the PBA. Dave LaMont, who had previously covered some PBA and PWBA telecasts on CBS Sports Network, now did play-by-play for ESPN broadcasts, while Dave Ryan handled PBA Tour events for CBS Sports Network.
2019–2025	Fox, CBS Sports	Rob Stone, Dave Ryan, John Fanta	Randy Pedersen	In March, 2018, the PBA announced a multi-year agreement with Fox Sports to cover the bulk of the PBA Tour broadcasts on FS1 starting in 2019 and running through at least 2022, with selected events to be broadcast on over-the-air Fox affiliates. Rob Stone, currently an employee of Fox Sports, returned as play-by-play announcer, rejoining Randy Pedersen with whom he partnered from 2007 to 2011 on ESPN. Dave Ryan, John Fanta and Dave LaMont filled in on play-by-play for broadcasts where Stone was on other assignments for Fox. Kimberly Pressler continued in her role as laneside reporter. CBS Sports Network carried only two 2019 events: The PBA Tour Finals in July and the U.S. Open in late October. Dave Ryan continued to handle play-by-play for CBS Sports, with Pedersen as the analyst. PBA Commissioner Tom Clark announced during the 2019 season that the U.S. Open would become part of the Fox winter schedule, beginning in 2020, while the PBA Tour Finals remained on CBS Sports Network through 2025.
2026–	The CW, CBS Sports	Rick Allen, Dave Ryan	Kyle Sherman	On December 15, 2025, the PBA announced that Rick Allen will be handling play-by-play for The CW broadcasts. PBA Tour bowler Kyle Sherman was named as the lead analyst/color commentator for The CW broadcasts. Sherman also appeared on CBS Sports broadcasts with longtime play-by-play man Dave Ryan. (Chris Barnes filled in as analyst for two tournaments in which Sherman made the telecast.) With Randy Pedersen not returning, it ended his run as the longest-tenured PBA color commentator (25 years; two years longer than Nelson Burton Jr.). Kimberly Pressler did not return as laneside reporter. Savannah Huemoeller appeared as laneside reporter on the first two CW broadcasts, with former Philadelphia Phillies in-stadium reporter Taryn Hatcher taking the role on subsequent broadcasts.

In its heyday, ABC's Professional Bowlers Tour outranked all sporting events on Saturdays with the exception of some college football telecasts.

On March 21, 2018, the PBA announced that Fox Sports signed a multi-year agreement to acquire the television rights to its events beginning in 2019. Most events were carried by the Fox Sports 1 cable network, but at least four events per season aired on the broadcast Fox network. The PBA's contract with Fox ended with a broadcast of the PBA Playoffs final round on May 24, 2025.

On April 30, 2025, the PBA announced that The CW had acquired the television rights to air ten live PBA Tour events on consecutive Sunday afternoons, beginning in 2026. The PBA then announced on May 29 that CBS Sports would televise the 2026 and 2027 PBA World Series of Bowling, with the four "animal pattern" events airing on CBS Sports Network, and the PBA World Championship Finals airing on CBS. CBS Sports Network will also carry the Norm Duke Open, which replaces the PBA Tour Finals.

=== Televised conversions of "impossible splits" ===
Mark Roth, whose first career title was captured at the 1975 PBA King Louie Open in Overland Park, Kansas by rolling a televised 299 game against Steve Jones, gained immortality by becoming the first bowler to convert the almost-impossible 7–10 split (or "bedposts") on national television in the first match of the ARC Alameda Open on January 5, 1980. In 1991, both John Mazza and Jess Stayrook accomplished this feat on television. Nearly 30 years later, 18-year old rookie Anthony Neuer became the fourth PBA player to convert the 7–10 split on television, doing so in the semifinal match of the 2021 U.S. Open against Jakob Butturff.

Even rarer than a 7–10 split conversion, the 4–6–7–10, or the "Big Four," though statistically easier than the 7–10, has only been made once in the Tour's television history, by Walter Ray Williams Jr. at the 2005 PBA Atlanta Classic against Ryan Shafer.

=== Televised perfect games ===
The following is a list of all perfect 300 games in nationally televised PBA Tour title events (PBA Hall of Famers in the Performance category marked with an asterisk; major tournaments in bold text):

No.	Player	Event	Air Date	Location	Opponent(s)	Bonus (USD)	Notes & Trivia
1	Jack Biondolillo	**Firestone Tournament of Champions**	April 1, 1967	Akron, Ohio	Les Schissler	$10,000	-First 300 game in a nationally televised bowling event
2	Johnny Guenther*	San Jose Open	February 1, 1969	San Jose, California	Don Johnson*	$10,000	
3	Jim Stefanich*	Midas Open	January 5, 1974	Alameda, California	Glenn Carlson	$10,000	
4	Pete McCordic	Greater Los Angeles Open	January 31, 1987	Torrance, California	Wayne Webb*	$10,000	-Ended the longest drought between televised PBA 300 games (13 years) -First televised 300 to be called by Chris Schenkel. (He was on other ABC assignments for the first three.)
5	Bob Benoit	Quaker State Open	January 23, 1988	Grand Prairie, Texas	Mark Roth*	$100,000	-First televised 300 game shot in a title match; -First $100,000 bonus for bowling a televised 300 -First televised 300 shot in player's TV debut
6	Mike Aulby*	Wichita Open	July 1, 1993	Wichita, Kansas	David Ozio*	$110,000	-First televised 300 by a left-handed bowler; -$10,000 from the PBA, $100,000 from Brunswick for using a Brunswick bowling ball to score 300; -Second televised 300 game shot in a title match; -Set record for combined score in a title match (579 total pins; Ozio shot 279)
7	Johnny Petraglia*	**PBA National Championship**	March 5, 1994	Toledo, Ohio	Walter Ray Williams Jr.*	$100,000	-Oldest player (47) to bowl 300 in a televised PBA Tour event
8	Butch Soper	Hilton Hotels Classic	July 12, 1994	Reno, Nevada	Bob Benoit	$10,000	-First PBA season with multiple televised 300 games; -First time a 300 was bowled on TV to beat another player who had previously bowled a 300 on TV (Benoit, 1988)
9	C.K. Moore	Columbia 300 Open	February 2, 1996	Austin, Texas	Parker Bohn III*	$25,000	-First bowler to roll a 300 game in his TV debut
10	Bob Learn Jr.	Flagship Open	April 6, 1996	Erie, Pennsylvania	Johnny Petraglia*	$100,000	-Highest four-game pinfall in a PBA Tour telecast (300, 270, 280, 279 = 1,129 total); -Second time a 300 was bowled on TV to beat another player who had previously bowled a 300 on TV (Petraglia, 1994) (to date, both events are the only $100,000 bonus prizes); -Tied record for combined score in a televised match (579 total pins; Petraglia shot 279)
11	Jason Queen	**ABC Masters**	May 3, 1997	Huntsville, Alabama	Bobby Fleetwood	None	-Retroactively added after a PBA rule change counted ABC/USBC Masters wins prior to 1998 as PBA titles; -No bonus was awarded for this perfect game (the sponsor, Contour Power Grips, would only provide a 300-game bonus if a bowler was wearing their company patch; Queen was not wearing said patch during his 300 game)
12	Steve Hoskins*	Ebonite Challenge 2	October 15, 1997	Rochester, New York	Walter Ray Williams Jr.*	$10,000	-Williams Jr.: first bowler to lose to a 300-game on TV multiple times
13	Parker Bohn III*	**ABC Masters**	May 9, 1998	Reno, Nevada	Chris Sand, Mike Mullin	$10,000	-Bohn: first bowler to have previously lost to a 300-game on TV (1996 vs. C.K. Moore) who later accomplished the same feat for a win -First televised 300 game bowled in a "shootout round"
14	Steve Jaros*	Chattanooga Open	February 13, 1999	Chattanooga, Tennessee	Ricky Ward	$10,000	-At the time, Jaros had the odd distinction of rolling the lowest-ever score in a televised PBA Tour event (129 in 1992) while also rolling the highest possible televised game (300). The lowest televised score now belongs to Tom Daugherty (100 in 2011).
15	Mike Miller	National Bowling Stadium Open	June 20, 1999	Reno, Nevada	Danny Wiseman*, Tim Criss	$10,000	
16	Norm Duke*	GEICO Earl Anthony Classic	January 5, 2003	Tacoma, Washington	Walter Ray Williams Jr.*	$10,000	
17	Mika Koivuniemi*	PBA Cambridge Credit Classic	December 7, 2003	Windsor Locks, Connecticut	Jason Couch*	$20,000	-First PBA televised 300 game by a player born outside of the United States
18	Tony Reyes	Motor City Classic	November 5, 2006	Taylor, Michigan	Parker Bohn III*	$10,000	-Bohn: second bowler to lose to a 300-game on TV multiple times; -Third time a 300 was bowled on TV to beat another player who had previously bowled a 300 on TV (Bohn, 1998)
19	Ryan Shafer	Pepsi Championship	March 18, 2007	Indianapolis, Indiana	Jeff Carter	$10,000	-Set a PBA TV record with 18 consecutive strikes in the same telecast.
20	Rhino Page	Dydo Japan Cup	April 25, 2009	Tokyo, Japan	Jeong Tae-Hwa	$100,000	-First televised 300 game in a PBA event held outside of the United States
21	Jason Belmonte	**PBA World Championship**	January 15, 2012	Las Vegas, Nevada	Mike Fagan, Brian Kretzer	$10,000	-Tape-delayed broadcast (rolled November 18, 2011)
22	Chris Barnes*	WSOB GEICO Shark Open	March 4, 2012	Las Vegas, Nevada	Sean Rash*	$10,000	-Tape-delayed broadcast (rolled November 19, 2011)
23	Sean Rash*	PBA Wolf Open	June 3, 2014	Shawnee, Oklahoma	Chris Loschetter	$10,000	-Tape-delayed broadcast (rolled May 24, 2014); -Rash: second bowler to have previously lost to a 300-game on TV (2012 vs. Chris Barnes) who later accomplished the same feat for a win
24	Ronnie Russell	WSOB Chameleon Championship	December 28, 2014	Las Vegas, Nevada	Sean Rash*, JR Raymond	$10,000	-Tape-delayed broadcast (rolled November 2, 2014); -Fourth time a 300 was bowled on TV to beat another player who had previously bowled a 300 on TV (Rash, 2014); -Rash: third bowler to lose to a 300-game on TV multiple times
25	Sean Rash*	**Barbasol PBA Tournament of Champions**	February 15, 2015	Indianapolis, Indiana	Ryan Ciminelli	$10,000	-First player with multiple televised PBA 300 games
26	François Lavoie	**U.S. Open**	November 9, 2016	Las Vegas, Nevada	Shawn Maldonado	$10,000	-First 300 game in the televised finals of the U.S. Open; still the only televised 300 in this event through 2025
27	Tommy Jones*	PBA Hall of Fame Classic	January 19, 2020	Arlington, Texas	Darren Tang	$10,000	-Third televised 300 game shot in a title match; -First televised 300 on a mixed oil pattern (left and right lanes had different lengths and layouts of oil)
28	Jakob Butturff	PBA Tour Finals	July 18, 2020	Jupiter, Florida	Norm Duke*, Sean Rash*, Anthony Simonsen	$10,000	-First time a televised 300 game was bowled against two bowlers at the same time who had also bowled televised 300 games (Duke, 2003; Rash, 2014-15); -Fifth time a 300 was bowled on TV to beat another player who had previously bowled a 300 on TV (Duke, 2003; Rash, 2014-15)
29	François Lavoie	PBA Tour Playoffs	October 11, 2020	Centreville, Virginia	Sean Rash*	$10,000	-Second player with multiple televised PBA 300 games (the first was Rash); -First PBA season with three televised 300 games; -Rash: involved in the most televised 300 games combined (6 total: 2 for, 4 against)
30	Chris Via	**PBA Players Championship**	February 7, 2021	Jupiter, Florida	Tim Foy Jr.	$10,000	
31	Sam Cooley	PBA Tour Playoffs	May 16, 2021	Milford, Connecticut	Kyle Troup	$10,000	-Cooley's 300 game did not result in a victory, as it was part of a "race to three points" match which Troup won 3 games to 1.
32	Chris Via	PBA Tour Finals	June 27, 2021	Allen Park, Michigan	E. J. Tackett	$10,000	-Third player with multiple televised PBA 300 games. First and only player (through 2026) with multiple televised 300 games in the same season.
33	Kyle Troup	PBA Tour Finals	June 5, 2022	Arlington, Washington	Kris Prather	$10,000	-Second televised 300 on a mixed oil pattern (left and right lanes had different lengths and layouts of oil); -Troup: third bowler to have previously lost to a 300-game on TV (2021 vs. Sam Cooley) who later accomplished the same feat for a win
34	Jason Belmonte	PBA Tour Finals	June 5, 2022	Arlington, Washington	Dom Barrett	$10,000	-First televised PBA event with multiple 300 games; -Fourth player with multiple televised PBA 300 games; -Fourth televised 300 game shot in a title match; -Third televised 300 on a mixed oil pattern (left and right lanes had different lengths and layouts of oil); -Longest gap between a player's first and second televised 300 games (10 years)
35	Jason Belmonte	PBA Tour Finals	June 25, 2023	Arlington, Washington	Kris Prather	$10,000	-First player with three televised PBA 300 games -Fourth televised 300 on a mixed oil pattern
36	Brandon Bonta	**PBA Players Championship**	February 22, 2026	Arlington, Texas	E. J. Tackett	$10,000	Second player (after Bob Benoit in 1988) to roll a championship game 300 in his TV debut, and the fifth to roll 300 in any game of a TV debut; -Fifth televised 300 shot in a championship match -Fifth televised 300 on a mixed oil pattern

== See also ==
- Professional Bowlers Tour - ABC telecast aired from 1962 to 1997.
- PBA Regional Tour
- PBA Women's Series
- World Bowling Tour
