= Randy Pedersen =

American sportscaster and professional bowler (1962–2026)

- Randy Pedersen in his role as PBA Tour color commentator

Personal information
- Born: May 28, 1962 Shallotte, North Carolina, U.S.
- Died: September 16, 2026 (aged 64) Orlando, Florida, U.S.
- Education: Saint Monica Catholic High School
- Years active: 1980–2006 (PBA Tour); 2000–2025 (broadcasting)
- Height: 6 ft 2 in (188 cm)

Bowling Information
- Affiliation: PBA
- Rookie year: 1985
- Dominant hand: Right
- Wins: 13 PBA Tour (1 major); 1 PBA50 Tour
- Sponsors: Storm Products

Randy Pedersen (May 28, 1962 – September 16, 2026) was an American sportscaster and professional bowler as a member of the Professional Bowlers Association (PBA). He earned 13 PBA Tour titles (one major) during his playing career. He then became the full-time color analyst for PBA Tour broadcasts on ESPN, Fox and CBS Sports Network from 2001 to 2025, as well as handling webcasts on PBA Xtra Frame, FloBowling and the BowlTV YouTube channel. This made him the longest-tenured bowling color commentator in PBA history, two years longer than Nelson Burton Jr. served in that capacity on ABC Sports. During the 2025 PBA Tour, he worked alongside play-by-play announcers Rob Stone, Dave Ryan, John Fanta and Dave LaMont, having previously worked with Lon McEachern and Mike Jakubowski.

Pedersen grew up in Southern California, but relocated to Clermont, Florida in the early 1990s. He resided in Florida ever since. Pedersen is a member of the PBA and USBC Halls of Fame.

== Bowling career ==
As a bowler, Pedersen won 13 PBA Tour titles, with 11 of them coming in a ten-season stretch between 1986 and 1995, when he was one of the top players on tour. Pedersen captured the prestigious PBA National Championship crown in 1987 for his first and only major title. He won three titles in the 1989 season, but was beaten out for PBA Player of the Year honors by Amleto Monacelli, who won four titles that year.

In 1991, Pedersen converted the 7-10 split on national television. The feat occurred in the 1991 Miller High Life Pins Game, an exhibition event featuring PBA players.

Pedersen won his last PBA Tour title at age 40 in the 2002 Pepsi Open. Having started his ESPN broadcast career a year earlier, he jokingly walked out during the player introductions with a microphone, then handed the microphone to an audience member as he made his way to the lanes. This title pushed him over the $1 million career earnings mark, making him the 24th career millionaire in PBA history at the time. He made it to the final match of the 2003 PBA Tournament of Champions, but lost the title to Patrick Healey Jr.

He is also known for having suffered from two of the worst breaks in PBA Tour history. Both came in major tournaments, and both times he lost by one pin. He lost the 1995 Bayer-Brunswick Touring Players Championship to veteran Ernie Schlegel by a scoreline of 236–237. Needing a strike on the first ball of the tenth frame to have a chance to win, Pedersen left what's known as a "stone 8-pin" standing on what appeared to be a perfect 1-3 pocket shot. That match is also remembered for Schlegel's reaction to the shot. In a thrill-of-victory/agony-of-defeat moment, Schlegel ran around in front of the crowd with his fists raised yelling, "I don't believe it! Yeah, yeah, yeah! For the old people!", while Pedersen fell down onto the approach and covered his face in disappointment. Pedersen was also knocked out of the 2005 Dexter Tournament of Champions after he left the 7-pin on his tenth frame fill shot to close out the semifinal against Norm Duke, losing 255–256.

Among his 34 career top-five finishes, Pedersen made it to the final match 17 times, compiling an impressive 13–4 record in those matches.

Pedersen was ranked #35 on the PBA's 2008 list of "50 Greatest Players of the last 50 years." He was elected to the PBA Hall of Fame in October 2010, and was inducted with the 2011 class on January 22, 2011.

He joined the PBA50 Tour (formerly PBA Senior Tour) in 2013, and on May 16 of that year he won the very first tournament he entered: the PBA50 Dayton Classic.

In November 2024, Pedersen was elected to the United States Bowling Congress (USBC) Hall of Fame. He was officially inducted with the 2025 class in a ceremony at the USBC convention on May 7.

The PBA debuted the Randy Pedersen 43 (43 feet in length) oil pattern at the 2026 USA versus The World event.

=== PBA Tour titles ===
Major titles in bold text.

1. 1986 AC-Delco Classic (Union City, California)
2. **1987 Toledo Trust PBA National Championship** (Toledo, Ohio)
3. 1987 Fair Lanes Open (Washington, D.C.)
4. 1988 Senior/Touring Pro Doubles Championship w/Carmen Salvino (Cheektowaga, New York)
5. 1989 AC-Delco Classic (Torrance, California)
6. 1989 Budweiser Classic (Miami, Florida)
7. 1989 Oranamin C Japan Cup (Tokyo, Japan)
8. 1990 Quaker State Open (Grand Prairie, Texas)
9. 1993 Billy Vukovich III Memorial Fresno Open (Fresno, California)
10. 1994 Greater Harrisburg Open (Mechanicsburg, Pennsylvania)
11. 1995 Ebonite Kentucky Classic (Louisville, Kentucky)
12. 1999 Indianapolis Open (Indianapolis, Indiana)
13. 2002 Pepsi Open (Springfield Twp., Pennsylvania)

=== PBA50 Tour titles ===
1. 2013 PBA50 Dayton Classic (Dayton, Ohio)

== Television and film ==
Off the lanes, Pedersen joined ESPN in 2001 as a TV analyst and had great success behind the microphone; Pedersen earned the position after getting his start in broadcasting as a lane-level reporter on ABC's Pro Bowlers Tour, in addition to working on Fox Sports Net for a brief time in 2000. Pedersen remained as the bowling analyst on ESPN through the termination of their PBA contract in 2018. He began working for Fox Sports in 2019 when the PBA Tour moved its TV broadcasts to Fox Sports networks. He also served as analyst on selected PBA Tour broadcasts hosted by CBS Sports Network.

Following the termination of the PBA's broadcast agreement with Fox in 2025, the PBA's parent company Lucky Strike Entertainment Corporation chose to go in a different direction for its television coverage. Pedersen was replaced by current PBA pro Kyle Sherman as analyst for televised tournaments on The CW and CBS/CBS Sports Network in 2026.

Pedersen has been lauded for his extensive knowledge of the game, associated bowling lingo and catch phrases (see below) as well as his sense of humor. He had a small part in the 1996 comedy movie Kingpin (he was placed right next to Woody Harrelson) along with several other professional bowlers, and has cameo appearances in the 2006 bowling documentary A League of Ordinary Gentlemen and the 2026 HBO Max documentary Born to Bowl.

== Famous phrases ==
Pedersen is notable for using various phrases used to describe different occurrences during PBA events. They include:

- "Dead flush perfect!"
- "He absolutely pure'd it."

(above two describing a perfectly-rolled strike, with all 10 pins going into the pit)

- "Nothin' left but pin shrapnel!"
- "Pulls the string on all 10 of 'em there."
- "Shreds the rack!"
- "That was filthier than a truck stop restroom!"

(above four have been used to describe a powerful strike)

- "Bartender, make it a double!"(sometimes shouted when a player throws back-to-back strikes)
- "BAD mammal!"(Pedersen uses this term either to describe a bowler on a hot streak, or serious pin carry when a less-than-perfect shot takes out all ten pins)
- "Winner winner, Chicken dinner!" (referring to the winner of a match)
- "Give me some coffee to go with that sweet roll!" (referring to a nicely rolled strike shot)
- "That one went out for a burger and fries, and came back with steak and a baked potato." (referring to a shot that rolls out close to the gutter and hooks back for a pocket strike)
- "That 6 pin just slapped the 10 pin silly!" (referring to a strike that could have been a solid 10, but the 6 pin goes off to the sidewall and hits the 10, knocking it down)
- "The 10 pin gets sent to the blue tent" (comparing a 10 pin taken out by a strong "messenger" pin to an NFL player being sent to the concussion protocol tent)
- "Hey, 10-pin...Get outta my face!" (another way he comments on a strong messenger pin taking out the 10-pin)
- "I can throw a messenger like that...said me never!" (one of several tongue-in-cheek references to his own bowling career)
- "He's cooler than a polar bear's feet" (describing a player who calmly makes a clutch shot under pressure)
- "Are you kidding me?" (reacting to a seriously bad break on a great shot)
- "It's wetter than an otter's pocket out there" (referring to an "out of bounds" area on the lane near the gutters that has so much oil, the ball will not hook back)

Pedersen once commented on his role as PBA Analyst on ESPN telecasts. He said, "I want to convey to the viewing public that they are watching the best bowlers in the world. It's my job to explain what makes them that good, as well as provide other information that 'Johnny 150 average' doesn't already know. One thing I learned is if you can bring enthusiasm to the table, sometimes it doesn't really matter what is coming out of your mouth. The viewing audience senses the enthusiasm."

== Personal life and death ==
Pedersen was father to two children with ex-wife Becky: a son and a daughter.

Pedersen died by suicide on September 16, 2026, at the age of 64. Following his death, his daughter Savannah organized a memorial fundraiser and publicly addressed the sudden nature of his passing. Aligning her message with National Suicide Prevention Awareness Month in September, she emphasized that even those with the brightest, most charismatic personalities can mask deep inner struggles, and she urged anyone silently suffering to seek help.

PBA Commissioner Tom Clark said of Pedersen's passing: "He was a force, a giant in sports and on TV. He was our friend, our partner. Randy was our voice. I spoke with so many people today who loved him. There will never be another Randy Pedersen." PBA.com columnist Nolan Hughes added: "No matter who joined him in the booth, Pedersen educated and entertained bowling fans. With his signature blend of charisma, humor, and analysis, Pedersen elevated professional bowling for more than a quarter century."

In the announcement for his memorial fundraiser, his family reflected on his dedication to the sport, writing: "Randy loved his job, the players, and his fans. Bowling was his life."
