= Don Johnson (bowler) =

American professional ten-pin bowler

Personal information
- Born: May 19, 1940 Kokomo, Indiana, U.S.
- Died: May 3, 2003 (aged 62) North Las Vegas, Nevada, U.S.
- Years active: 1964–1981

Bowling Information
- Affiliation: PBA
- Rookie year: 1964
- Dominant hand: Right (stroker delivery)
- Wins: 26 PBA Tour (2 majors)

Don Johnson (May 19, 1940 – May 3, 2003) was born in Kokomo, Indiana, but spent most of his adult life in Akron, Ohio and Las Vegas, Nevada.

He was an American ten-pin bowler who spent many years on the Professional Bowlers Association (PBA) tour. He won 26 PBA titles (11th most all-time), including two major championships, and is a member of the PBA and USBC Halls of Fame.

== PBA career ==
Don Johnson, a right-handed bowler, joined the PBA Tour in 1963. He captured at least one PBA title every season from 1966 to 1977, on his way to 26 PBA titles in all. That total places him 11th on the all-time titles list.

Johnson was voted PBA Player of the Year in 1971 and 1972. But perhaps his shining moment came in 1970, when he won the prestigious Firestone Tournament of Champions and nearly achieved perfection in the process. In the final match, Johnson's opponent, Dick Ritger, finished first and posted a 268 score. Johnson coolly struck on his first ball in the tenth to lock up the major title, and also struck on his eleventh shot. On the final roll, he left a single 10-pin on a solid pocket shot for a 299 game. Leaving the 10-pin wasn't as famous as Johnson's reaction to it; he dropped on the floor and left his face down for several seconds before getting up to a thunderous ovation (Johnson's wife Mary Anne was shown in the audience, crying). The 10-pin denied Johnson $10,000 and a new Mercury Cougar automobile, which were offered as bonuses that season for any televised 300 game. In his post-tournament interview with Chris Schenkel, Johnson downplayed the bad break, stating, "I'm just thankful that I finally won this dadgum thing." (He had finished second in two previous Tournament of Champions events.)

Johnson made it to the final match of the Tournament of Champions a fourth time in 1971, but had to settle for his third runner-up finish in the event after being defeated by Johnny Petraglia. He won a second major title at the 1972 U.S. Open.

In the 1980s, Johnson made a successful transition from pro bowler to bowling instructor. He taught bowlers from over 20 countries and produced an acclaimed book/video instructional package on the sport. Among his students was 13-time PBA titlist, Hall of Famer and bowling broadcaster Randy Pedersen.

== Legacy ==
On March 2, 2008, a PBA Tour stop in Columbus, Ohio was named in Johnson's honor: the Don Johnson Buckeye State Classic. In 2009, the tournament was renamed the Don Johnson Eliminator Championship.

Don's son, Jimmy Johnson, won a PBA Tour title in 1990, making them the second father-and-son combination to each win a title on the standard Tour (following Dick and Pete Weber). Friend and bowling writer Rich Carrubba, who watched the telecast of Jimmy's victory with Don, quoted Don as saying, "This means more to me than anything I have ever done myself."

Don Johnson was inducted into the PBA Hall of Fame in 1977, and the USBC Hall of Fame in 1982.

== Awards and recognition ==
- PBA Player of the Year (1971, 1972)
- PBA Steve Nagy Sportsmanship Award (1977)
- Inducted into PBA Hall of Fame (1977)
- Inducted into USBC Hall of Fame (1982)
- Placed #8 in Bowling Magazine's 2000 list of the "20 Best Bowlers of the 20th Century"
- Also placed #8 on the PBA's 2008 list of "50 Greatest Players of the Last 50 Years"
- Briefly held the record for most consecutive seasons with at least one PBA Tour title (12; from 1966 to 1977), until broken by Earl Anthony in 1982
- The PBA's "Don Johnson 40" oil pattern is used at the Tournament of Champions major, in honor of Don's emotional 1970 victory and his connection to the Ohio host location.

== Career tour titles ==
=== PBA Tour Titles ===
Major championships are in bold text.

1. 1964 Denver PBA Open, Denver, Colorado.
2. 1966 Portland Open, Portland, Oregon.
3. 1967 Seattle Open, Seattle, Washington.
4. 1967 Brockton Open, Brockton, Massachusetts.
5. 1968 Portsmouth-Norfolk Open, Portsmouth, Virginia.
6. 1968 Japan Gold Cup, Tokyo, Japan.
7. 1969 Seattle Open, Seattle, Washington.
8. 1969 Lincoln Open, Lincoln, Nebraska.
9. 1969 Hawaiian Invitational, Honolulu, Hawaii.
10. 1970 New Orleans Lions Open, New Orleans, Louisiana.
11. **1970 PBA Tournament of Champions**, Akron, Ohio.
12. 1971 Showboat Invitational, Las Vegas, Nevada.
13. 1971 Seattle Open, Seattle, Washington.
14. 1971 Winston-Salem Open, Redwood City, California.
15. 1971 Waukegan Open, Waukegan, Illinois.
16. 1971 Bellows-Valvair Open, Detroit, Michigan.
17. 1971 Brunswick World Open, Glendale Heights, Illinois.
18. **1972 U.S. Open**, New York, New York.
19. 1972 Denver Open, Denver, Colorado.
20. 1972 Brunswick World Open, Glendale Heights, Illinois.
21. 1973 Houston-Sertoma Open, Houston, Texas.
22. 1973 Bay City Open, Bay City, Michigan.
23. 1974 Buzz Fazio Open, Battle Creek, Michigan.
24. 1975 Tucson Open, Tucson, Arizona.
25. 1976 PBA Doubles Classic w/Paul Colwell, San Jose, California.
26. 1977 Midas Open, Gretna, Louisiana.

== Death ==
Don Johnson died of a heart attack in 2003 at age 62 in North Las Vegas, Nevada.
