= PBA Regional Tour =

American bowling competition

- Abbreviation: PBA
- Formation: 1958
- Headquarters: Mechanicsville, Virginia
- Region served: USA (7 regions)
- Commissioner: Tom Clark
- Website: www.pba.com/pba-tour/pba-regional-tour

The PBA Regional Tour is a series of "mini tours", run by the Professional Bowlers Association, spanning across seven regions within the United States. The Tour allows PBA members and qualifying non-member amateurs to compete in weekend events. The Tour consists of seven regions: Central, East, Midwest, Northwest, South, Southwest, and West.

== Regional Qualifying for the PBA Tour ==
The vast majority of the PBA's 3,000+ members are Regional professionals. In a typical season, fewer than 100 players regularly compete on the national PBA Tour.

Through the 2008–09 season, Regional PBA professionals could qualify for the national tour by topping one of the seven regions in points. For the 2009–10 season, Regional qualification was revised, as bowlers had to qualify via the Regional Players Invitational (RPI) tournament. The top 25 bowlers on the RPI points list in each of the seven PBA regions (through September, 2008) earned an invitation to the 2008 RPI. The top five from each region – plus the winner of the 2008 Regional Players Championship (won by Sean Swanson in late May that year) – received airfare and accommodations for the event in December, 2008 and did not have to pay an additional fee to be eligible for a PBA Tour exemption. The next 20 players in each region were required to pay their own way to the RPI, and also had to pay an additional $750 on top of the entry fee to be eligible for a Tour exemption.

The 2008 RPI featured a similar format to the PBA Tour Trials, in that competitors bowled for five days on each of the PBA's five "animal" oil patterns. The top eight bowlers who (if necessary) paid the additional entry fee earned exemptions for the 2009–10 season, provided they finished in the top 16 overall.

== Current Regional Tour ==
The PBA continues to run a Regional Tour to the present day. Regional Tour events are open to both PBA members and non-members, with most events requiring a higher entry fee for non-members. Any player who wins two Regional Tour events in a season as a non-member must become a PBA member to enter any subsequent events during that season.

In August of 2026, PBA CEO Peter Murray announced the PBA ELITE Regional Tour, reconfigured to create a more rewarding journey and clearer pathway for top players to make it to the PBA National Tour. The Fall 2026 Regional events were subsequently cancelled and replaced by 21 "elevated" tournaments (three in each of the PBA's seven regions). The PBA promised increased prize funds, dedicated marketing campaigns, expanded storytelling and broader media coverage, including live streaming on the BowlTV YouTube channel. While the Regional Players Invitational (RPI) has been retained for December of 2026, the PBA will also launch the PBA COMBINE, designed to measure, identify and recognize top regional players who will be selected for the PBA National Tour.

== Youngest Regional Tour Champion ==
Brady McDonough, at the age of 15 years and 137 days, is the youngest athlete to win a PBA Regional event. He won the PBA Copperfield Southwest Challenge in Houston on April 9, 2023 by defeating Justin Veitch 253-236 in the title match. However, as McDonough was not a member of the Professional Bowlers Association (PBA) at that time, his victory did not count as an official PBA Regional title. McDonough received $2,500 in scholarship money as part of his prize. The youngest player to win a Regional Tour title as a PBA member was Deo Benard, who won the 2020 South Point West Challenge at age 16 years, 234 days.
