= Bowling at the 2011 Pan American Games – Women's individual =

Women's individual at the 2011 Pan American Games
- Venue: Bolearmo Tapatio
- Dates: October 24 – 27

Medalists
Gold medal	Liz Johnson	United States
Silver medal	Jennifer Park	Canada
Bronze medal	Caroline Lagrange	Canada
Bronze medal	Karen Marcano	Venezuela

The women's individual competition of the bowling events at the 2011 Pan American Games will take place between the 24 and 27 of October at the Bolearmo Tapatio. The defending Pan American Games champion is Tennelle Milligan of the United States, while the defending Pan American Championship champion is Karen Marcano of Venezuela.

== Qualification round ==
In the qualification round, the bowlers are ranked according to their performance across twelve bowling games. The top sixteen bowlers advance to the knockout round.

Player	Block 1 (Games 1–6)						Block 2 (Games 7–12)						Total	Average	Rank
Player	1	2	3	4	5	6	7	8	9	10	11	12	Total	Average	Rank
Kelly Kulick (USA)	206	225	216	226	248	255	258	215	171	220	210	194	2644	220.3	1
Liz Johnson (USA)	237	249	248	206	222	190	215	204	214	236	205	210	2636	219.7	2
Caroline Lagrange (CAN)	223	258	237	278	166	199	169	200	186	197	182	213	2508	209.0	3
Sofia Rodriguez (GUA)	168	259	188	211	175	184	198	203	214	218	268	214	2500	208.3	4
Marizete Scheer (BRA)	179	172	243	258	214	184	170	189	199	183	193	230	2414	201.2	5
Aura Guerra (DOM)	200	215	223	175	256	215	198	175	148	200	183	224	2412	201.0	6
Jennifer Park (CAN)	194	196	214	199	267	195	157	214	232	178	156	187	2389	199.1	7
Karen Marcano (VEN)	183	221	201	224	203	198	202	171	210	169	193	194	2369	197.4	8
Kamilah Dammers (ARU)	225	222	203	211	176	225	232	140	157	199	172	198	2360	196.7	9
Thashaïna Seraus (ARU)	166	202	178	211	211	230	169	224	186	182	186	201	2346	195.5	10
Miriam Zetter (MEX)	190	202	191	235	233	212	157	186	176	185	195	176	2338	194.8	11
Andrea Rojas (CHI)	204	186	206	222	183	203	202	148	175	221	187	188	2325	193.8	12
Patricia de Faria (VEN)	217	212	204	159	156	235	199	184	228	205	138	175	2312	192.7	13
Anggie Ramírez (COL)	180	167	224	200	198	208	160	170	199	221	185	177	2289	190.8	14
Yoselin Leon (PUR)	182	168	200	226	200	213	163	194	150	189	190	207	2282	190.2	15
Stephanie Martins (BRA)	157	202	213	178	193	186	176	189	166	198	191	180	2229	185.8	16
Constanza Bahamondez (CHI)	198	200	196	183	177	183	159	181	159	222	154	203	2215	184.6	17
Eugenia Quintanilla (ESA)	216	200	133	216	216	142	142	213	171	181	195	169	2194	182.8	18
Mariana Ayala (PUR)	144	178	191	164	242	176	187	204	182	186	178	159	2191	182.6	19
Sandra Góngora (MEX)	179	168	168	213	180	180	172	180	211	192	179	166	2188	182.3	19
Ximena Soto (GUA)	223	149	166	154	211	175	170	157	198	181	241	159	2184	182.0	21
Sylvia Villalobos (CRC)	186	200	169	191	179	177	202	194	174	168	169	173	2182	181.8	22
Viviana Delgado (CRC)	211	222	176	182	181	179	174	169	140	192	159	181	2166	180.5	23
Carmen Granillo (ESA)	134	192	212	155	206	166	143	171	183	192	197	173	2124	177.0	24
Connie Seragaki (PER)	174	155	190	146	185	181	168	201	179	181	178	156	2094	174.5	25
Gloria Dill (BER)	163	155	137	160	175	170	142	194	186	157	212	197	2048	170.7	26
Maria Vilas (DOM)	167	171	173	161	185	167	149	166	171	169	181	180	2040	170.0	27
Dianne Jones (BER)	150	148	178	180	158	174	147	134	177	163	190	168	1967	163.9	28
Joanne Woodside (BAH)	149	148	160	159	195	163	144	190	146	123	176	186	1939	161.6	29
Veronica Delgado (PER)	159	190	167	160	144	166	172	153	163	141	138	144	1897	158.1	30
Justina Sturrup (BAH)	Did not start														DNS
María Rodríguez (COL)	Did not start														DNS

== Playoffs ==
Eighth-finals
1	Kelly Kulick (USA)	587
16	Stephanie Martins (BRA)	630
2	Liz Johnson (USA)	676
15	Yoselin Leon (PUR)	626
3	Caroline Lagrange (CAN)	619
14	Anggie Ramírez (COL)	608
4	Sofia Rodriguez (GUA)	586
13	Patricia de Faria (VEN)	620
5	Marizete Scheer (BRA)	548
12	Andrea Rojas (CHI)	542
6	Aura Guerra (DOM)	578
11	Miriam Zetter (MEX)	539
7	Jennifer Park (CAN)	621
10	Thashaïna Seraus (ARU)	591
8	Karen Marcano (VEN)	645
9	Kamilah Dammers (ARU)	613

Quarterfinals
1	Liz Johnson (USA)	648
8	Marizete Scheer (BRA)	515
2	Karen Marcano (VEN)	652
7	Aura Guerra (DOM)	595
3	Stephanie Martins (BRA)	535
6	Caroline Lagrange (CAN)	573
4	Jennifer Park (CAN)	668
5	Patricia de Faria (VEN)	535

Semifinals
1	Jennifer Park (CAN)	180	187	210
4	Caroline Lagrange (CAN)	188	174	184
2	Karen Marcano (VEN)	206	203
3	Liz Johnson (USA)	249	254

Final
1	Jennifer Park (CAN)	196	190
2	Liz Johnson (USA)	232	235
