= Bowling at the World Games =

Bowling has been part of all World Games. The games include the disciplines Nine-pin bowling and Ten-pin bowling.

== Nine-pin bowling ==
=== Men ===
==== Singles ====
| Games | Gold | Silver | Bronze |
|---|---|---|---|
| 2005 Duisburg | Steve Blasen (LUX) | Guus Maes (NED) | Bernardo Immendorf (BRA) |

=== Women ===
==== Singles ====
| Games | Gold | Silver | Bronze |
|---|---|---|---|
| 2005 Duisburg | Elgin Justen (GER) | Petra Comoth (BEL) | Marcelline Della Modesta (LUX) |

=== Mixed ===
==== Doubles ====
| Games | Gold | Silver | Bronze |
|---|---|---|---|
| 2005 Duisburg | Germany (GER); Elgin Justen; Holger Mayer | Luxembourg (LUX); Marcelline Della Modesta; Steve Blasen | Netherlands (NED); Maria Berends; Guus Maes |

== Ten-pin bowling ==
=== Men ===
==== Singles ====
| Games | Gold | Silver | Bronze |
|---|---|---|---|
| 1981 Santa Clara | Arne Svein Strøm (NOR) | Ernst Berndt (AUT) | Chris Batson (AUS) |
| 1985 London | Raymond Jansson (SWE) | Arne Svein Strøm (NOR) | Utz Dehler (FRG) |
| 1989 Karlsruhe | Ma Ying-Chieh (TPE) | Darold Meisel (USA) | Hendro Pratono (INA) |
| 1993 The Hague | Tomas Leandersson (SWE) | Yvan Augustin (FRA) | Paeng Nepomuceno (PHI) |
| 1997 Lahti | Gery Verbruggen (BEL) | Vernon Peterson (USA) | Paeng Nepomuceno (PHI) |
| 2001 Akita | Tobias Gäbler (GER) | Kim Kyung-Min (KOR) | Tom Hahl (FIN) |
| 2005 Duisburg | Kai Virtanen (FIN) | Gery Verbruggen (BEL) | Andrew Cain (USA) |
| 2009 Kaohsiung | Manuel Otalora (COL) | Wu Siu Hong (HKG) | Adrian Ang (MAS) |
| 2013 Cali | Osku Palermaa (FIN) | Mads Sandbækken (NOR) | Hwang Dong-Jun (KOR) |
| 2017 Wroclaw | Cho Young-Seon (KOR) | Ildemaro Ruiz (VEN) | Tobias Börding (GER) |
| 2022 Birmingham | Sam Cooley (AUS) | Jaroslav Lorenc (CZE) | Graham Fach (CAN) |

==== Doubles ====
| Games | Gold | Silver | Bronze |
|---|---|---|---|
| 2017 Wroclaw | Canada (CAN); François Lavoie; Dan MacLelland | Venezuela (VEN); Massimiliano Fridegotto; Ildemaro Ruiz | Hong Kong (HKG); Wu Siu Hong; Michael Mak |
| 2022 Birmingham | Denmark (DEN); Jesper Agerbo; Dan Östergaard-Poulsen | Canada (CAN); Graham Fach; Darren Alexander | South Korea (KOR); Kim Dong-hyeon; Park Dong-hyun |

==== All Events ====
| Games | Gold | Silver | Bronze |
|---|---|---|---|
| 1985 London | Raymond Jansson (SWE) | Utz Dehler (FRG) | Byun Yong-Hwon (KOR) |

=== Women ===
==== Singles ====
| Games | Gold | Silver | Bronze |
|---|---|---|---|
| 1981 Santa Clara | Liliane Gregori (FRA) | Porntip Singha (THA) | Mary Lou Vining (USA) |
| 1985 London | Adelene Wee (SIN) | Pam Pope (AUS) | Jette Hansen (DEN) |
| 1989 Karlsruhe | Jane Amlinger (CAN) | Arianne Cerdeña (PHI) | Patty Ann (USA) |
| 1993 The Hague | Pauline Smith (GBR) | Lisa Kwan (MAS) | Oh Hi (KOR) |
| 1997 Lahti | Patricia Schwarz (GER) | Isabelle Saldjian (FRA) | Lee Mi-Young (KOR) |
| 2001 Akita | Sofia Matilde Rodriguez (GUA) | Ross Greiner (NED) | Piritta Kantola (FIN) |
| 2005 Duisburg | Kim Soo-Kyung (KOR) | Zara Glover (GBR) | Caroline Lagrange (CAN) |
| 2009 Kaohsiung | Krista Pöllänen (FIN) | Zara Glover (GBR) | Liza del Rosario (PHI) |
| 2013 Cali | Daria Kovalova (UKR) | Kelly Kulick (USA) | Karen Marcano (VEN) |
| 2017 Wroclaw | Kelly Kulick (USA) | Clara Guerrero (COL) | Daria Kovalova (UKR) |
| 2022 Birmingham | Shannon O'Keefe (USA) | Clara Guerrero (COL) | Jenny Wegner (SWE) |

In 2017, Laura Buethner of Germany originally won gold in women's singles. In a competition doping test after the medal ceremony, Buethner tested positive for a banned substance. As a result of the positive doping test, Buethner was stripped of the gold medal. Kelly Kulick, who originally won silver, was awarded the gold medal. Clara Guerrero, who originally won bronze, was awarded the silver medal and Daria Kovalova, originally fourth in the final standings, was awarded the bronze medal.

==== Doubles ====
| Games | Gold | Silver | Bronze |
|---|---|---|---|
| 2017 Wroclaw | Colombia (COL); Clara Guerrero; Rocio Restrepo | United States (USA); Kelly Kulick; Danielle McEwan | Mexico (MEX); Sandra Góngora; Tannya Lopez |
| 2022 Birmingham | Denmark (DEN); Mika Guldbaek; Mai Ginge Jensen | United States (USA); Shannon O'Keefe; Julia Bond | Malaysia (MAS); Li Jane Sin; Natasha Mohamed Roslan |

==== All Events ====
| Games | Gold | Silver | Bronze |
|---|---|---|---|
| 1985 London | Gisela Lins (FRG) | Josette Romon (SUI) | Pam Pope (AUS) |

=== Mixed ===
==== Doubles ====
| Games | Gold | Silver | Bronze |
|---|---|---|---|
| 1981 Santa Clara | Australia (AUS); Ruth Guerster; Chris Batson | Finland (FIN); Ari Leppala; Mikko Kaartinen | Austria (AUT); Hilde Reitermaier; Ernst Berndt |
| 1985 London | Belgium (BEL); Nora Haveneers; Dominique De Nolf | West Germany (FRG); Gisela Lins; Utz Dehler | Philippines (PHI); Bong Coo; Rene Reyes |
| 1989 Karlsruhe | Chinese Taipei (TPE); Ma Ying-Chieh; Huang Yuen-Yue | Philippines (PHI); Arianne Cerdeña; Jorge Fernández | West Germany (FRG); Michaela Viol; Wolfgang Strupf |
| 1993 The Hague | Finland (FIN); Pauliina Aalto; Mika Koivuniemi | Sweden (SWE); Åsa Larsson; Tomas Leandersson | France (FRA); Isabelle Saldjian; Yvan Augustin |
| 1997 Lahti | Malaysia (MAS); Sharon Low; Daniel Lim | Australia (AUS); Cara Honeychurch; Andrew Frawley | Japan (JPN); Tomomi Shibata; Shigeo Saito |
| 2001 Akita | Great Britain (GBR); Kirsten Penny; Steven Thornton | Germany (GER); Tanya Petty; Tobias Gäbler | Norway (NOR); Mette Hansen; Petter Hansen |
| 2005 Duisburg | France (FRA); Isabelle Saldjian; François Sacco | Malaysia (MAS); Shalin Zulkifli; Zulmazran Zulkifli | South Korea (KOR); Kim Soo-Kyung; Kang Hee-Won |
| 2009 Kaohsiung | South Korea (KOR); Gye Min-Young; Kong Byoung-Hee | Colombia (COL); Anggie Ramírez; Manuel Otalora | Malaysia (MAS); Zatil Iman Abdul Ghani; Adrian Ang |
| 2013 Cali | United States (USA); Kelly Kulick; Mike Fagan | Canada (CAN); Lynne Gauthier; Dan MacLelland | Mexico (MEX); Sandra Góngora; Alejandro Cruz |
