= Bowling at the 2015 Pan American Games – Women's doubles =

Women's doubles at the 2015 Pan American Games
- Venue: Pan Am Bowling Centre
- Dates: July 22–23
- Competitors: 28 from 14 nations
- Winning score: 5074

Medalists
Gold medal	Clara Guerrero; Rocio Restrepo	Colombia
Silver medal	Liz Johnson; Shannon Pluhowsky	United States
Bronze medal	Patricia de Faria; Karen Marcano	Venezuela

The women's doubles competition of the bowling events at the 2015 Pan American Games was held on July 22 and 23 at Planet Bowl (Pan Am Bowling Centre), due to naming rights the venue was known as the latter for the duration of the games.

== Schedule ==
All times are Eastern Standard Time (UTC-3).

Date	Time	Round
July 22, 2015	15:05	1–6 Games
July 23, 2015	10:05	7–12 Games

== Qualification ==
A total of 14 countries qualified two bowlers each through various events. This is summarized below.

Event	Vacancies	Qualified	Bowlers per NOC	Total
Host nation	1	Canada	2	2
South American Game	4	Colombia; Venezuela; Argentina; Chile	2	8
Pan American Sports Festival	3	Mexico; Brazil; Costa Rica	2	6
PABCON Women's Championship	4	United States; Aruba; Puerto Rico; Dominican Republic	2	8
Central American and Caribbean Games	2	El Salvador; Guatemala	2	4
TOTAL				28

== Medalists ==
Event	Gold	Silver	Bronze
Women's doubles	Colombia; Clara Guerrero; Rocio Restrepo	United States; Liz Johnson; Shannon Pluhowsky	Venezuela; Patricia de Faria; Karen Marcano

== Results ==
Rank	Nation	Athlete	Total	Grand Total	Notes
1st place, gold medalist(s)	Colombia	Clara Guerrero; Rocio Restrepo	2542; 2532	5074	
2nd place, silver medalist(s)	United States	Liz Johnson; Shannon Pluhowsky	2501; 2424	4925	
3rd place, bronze medalist(s)	Venezuela	Patricia de Faria; Karen Marcano	2433; 2386	4819	
4	Puerto Rico	Mariana Ayala; Kristie Lopez	2427; 2384	4811	
5	Dominican Republic	Aumi Guerra; Ana Henriquez	2354; 2430	4784	
6	El Salvador	Eugenia Quintanilla; Marcela Sánchez	2426; 2353	4779	
7	Argentina	Maria Lanzavecchia; Vanesa Rinke	2244; 2402	4646	
8	Canada	Robin Orlikowski; Isabelle Rioux	2314; 2295	4609	
9	Aruba	Kamilah Dammers; Thashaïna Seraus	2314; 2287	4601	
10	Mexico	Sandra Góngora; Iliana Lomeli	2308; 2232	4540	
11	Brazil	Roberta Rodrigues; Stephanie Martins	2293; 2240	4533	
12	Guatemala	Laura Barrios; Sofia Rodriguez	2186; 2240	4426	
13	Costa Rica	Ghiselle Araujo; Maria Ramirez	2133; 2276	4409	
14	Chile	Cony Bahamondez; Veronica Valdebenito	2010; 2133	4143	
