= Bowling at the 2023 Pan American Games – Women's doubles =

Women's doubles at the 2023 Pan American Games
- Venue: Bowling Center
- Dates: November 2
- Competitors: 24 from 12 nations
- Winning score: 3274

Medalists
Gold medal	Jordan Richard; Breanna Clemmer	United States
Silver medal	Juliana Franco; Clara Guerrero	Colombia
Bronze medal	Sandra Góngora; Iliana Lomeli	Mexico

The women's doubles competition of the bowling events at the 2023 Pan American Games was held on November 2 at the Bowling Center in La Florida, Chile.

== Schedule ==
Date	Time	Round
November 2, 2023	08:00	Final

== Results ==
The results were as follows:

Rank	Nation	Athlete	Total	Grand Total
1st place, gold medalist(s)	United States	Jordan Richard; Breanna Clemmer	1605; 1669	3274
2nd place, silver medalist(s)	Colombia	Juliana Franco; Clara Guerrero	1439; 1660	3099
3rd place, bronze medalist(s)	Mexico	Sandra Góngora; Iliana Lomeli	1495; 1587	3082
4	Puerto Rico	Pamela Pérez; Zoriani Reyes	1393; 1580	2973
5	Brazil	Roberta Camargo; Stephanie Martins	1475; 1456	2931
6	El Salvador	Roxana Fajardo; Eugenia Quintanilla	1460; 1443	2903
7	Chile	Verónica Valdebenito; María José Caro	1391; 1389	2780
8	Venezuela	Karen Marcano; Alicia Marcano	1397; 1353	2750
9	Dominican Republic	Aura Guerra; Vivian Luna	1374; 1369	2743
10	Costa Rica	Jessica Atan; Elena Weinstok	1390; 1349	2739
11	Aruba	Abigail Dammers; Kamilah Dammers	1170; 1562	2732
12	Independent Athletes Team	Ana Bolaños; Sofía Rodríguez	1369; 1340	2709
