= Bowling at the 2015 Pan American Games – Women's singles =

Women's singles at the 2015 Pan American Games
- Venue: Pan Am Bowling Centre
- Dates: July 24–25
- Competitors: 28 from 14 nations
- Winning score: 223

Medalists
Gold medal	Shannon Pluhowsky	United States
Silver medal	Aumi Guerra	Dominican Republic
Bronze medal	Liz Johnson	United States
Bronze medal	Rocio Restrepo	Colombia

The women's singles competition of the bowling events at the 2015 Pan American Games was held on July 24 and 25 at Planet Bowl (Pan Am Bowling Centre), due to naming rights the venue was known as the latter for the duration of the games.

== Schedule ==
All times are Eastern Standard Time (UTC-3).

Date	Time	Round
July 24, 2015	10:05	Qualification 1–6 Games
July 24, 2015	15:30	Qualification 7–12 Games
July 25, 2015	10:05	Round Robin
July 25, 2015	14:35	Semifinals
July 25, 2015	15:00	Final

== Qualification ==
A total of 14 countries qualified two bowlers each through various events. This is summarized below.

Event	Vacancies	Qualified	Bowlers per NOC	Total
Host nation	1	Canada	2	2
South American Game	4	Colombia; Venezuela; Argentina; Chile	2	8
Pan American Sports Festival	3	Mexico; Brazil; Costa Rica	2	6
PABCON Women's Championship	4	United States; Aruba; Puerto Rico; Dominican Republic	2	8
Central American and Caribbean Games	2	El Salvador; Guatemala	2	4
TOTAL				28

== Medalists ==
Event	Gold	Silver	Bronze
Women's singles	Shannon Pluhowsky; United States	Aumi Guerra; Dominican Republic	Liz Johnson; United States
Women's singles	Shannon Pluhowsky; United States	Aumi Guerra; Dominican Republic	Rocio Restrepo; Colombia

== Results ==
=== Qualification ===
Rank	Nation	Athlete	Qualification	Rank	Round Robin	Total	Notes
1	Liz Johnson	United States	2709	1	1687	4396	Q
2	Shannon Pluhowsky	United States	2553	5	1789	4342	Q
3	Rocio Restrepo	Colombia	2550	6	1720	4270	Q
4	Aumi Guerra	Dominican Republic	2589	4	1659	4248	Q
5	Thashaïna Seraus	Aruba	2591	3	1630	4221	
6	Sandra Góngora	Mexico	2510	7	1693	4203	
7	Clara Guerrero	Colombia	2634	2	1565	4199	
8	Kristie Lopez	Puerto Rico	2445	8	1633	4078	
9	Vanesa Rinke	Argentina	2438	9	did not advance		
10	Isabelle Rioux	Canada	2424	10	did not advance		
11	Marcela Sánchez	El Salvador	2412	11	did not advance		
12	Karen Marcano	Venezuela	2390	12	did not advance		
13	Mariana Ayala	Puerto Rico	2382	13	did not advance		
14	Robin Orlikowski	Canada	2359	14	did not advance		
15	Ana Henriquez	Dominican Republic	2347	15	did not advance		
16	Laura Barrios	Guatemala	2333	16	did not advance		
17	Roberta Rodrigues	Brazil	2328	17	did not advance		
18	Sofia Rodriguez	Guatemala	2325	18	did not advance		
19	Stephanie Martins	Brazil	2318	19	did not advance		
20	Patricia de Faria	Venezuela	2310	20	did not advance		
21	Eugenia Quintanilla	El Salvador	2286	21	did not advance		
22	Maria Ramirez	Costa Rica	2275	22	did not advance		
23	Maria Lanzavecchia	Argentina	2273	23	did not advance		
24	Iliana Lomeli	Mexico	2231	24	did not advance		
25	Kamilah Dammers	Aruba	2121	25	did not advance		
26	Cony Bahamonde	Chile	2104	26	did not advance		
27	Ghiselle Araujo	Costa Rica	2079	27	did not advance		
28	Veronica Valdebenito	Chile	1931	28	did not advance		

=== Semifinals ===
Match	Rank	Nation	Athlete	Total	Notes
1	1	Aumi Guerra	Dominican Republic	258	Q
1	2	Liz Johnson	United States	181	
2	1	Shannon Pluhowsky	United States	214	Q
2	2	Rocio Restrepo	Colombia	212	

=== Final ===
Rank	Nation	Athlete	Total	Notes
1st place, gold medalist(s)	Shannon Pluhowsky	United States	223	
2nd place, silver medalist(s)	Aumi Guerra	Dominican Republic	212	
