= Bowling at the 2023 Pan American Games – Women's singles =

Women's singles at the 2023 Pan American Games
- Venue: Bowling Center
- Dates: November 3 - November 5
- Competitors: 25 from 12 nations
- Winning score: 687

Medalists
Gold medal	Clara Guerrero	Colombia
Silver medal	Juliana Franco	Colombia
Bronze medal	Breanna Clemmer	United States
Bronze medal	Sandra Góngora	Mexico

The women's singles competition of the bowling events at the 2023 Pan American Games was held from November 3 to 5 at the Bowling Center in La Florida, Chile.

== Schedule ==
Date	Time	Round
November 3, 2023	14:00	Ranking Round - Day 1
November 4, 2023	08:00	Ranking Round - Day 2
November 5, 2023	10:00	Semifinals
November 5, 2023	12:00	Final

== Results ==
=== Round Robin ===
The highest four scores advance to the semifinals.

Rank	Nation	Athlete	Total	Notes
1	Clara Guerrero	Colombia	3484	Q
2	Sandra Góngora	Mexico	3334	Q
3	Juliana Franco	Colombia	3295	Q
4	Breanna Clemmer	United States	3278	Q
5	Kamilah Dammers	Aruba	3251	
6	Roberta Camargo	Brazil	3154	
7	Iliana Lomeli	Mexico	3139	
8	Aura Guerra	Dominican Republic	3123	
9	Elena Weinstok	Costa Rica	3112	
10	Ana Bolaños	Independent Athletes Team	3111	
11	Sofía Rodríguez	Independent Athletes Team	3079	
12	Jordan Richard	United States	3063	
13	Eugenia Quintanilla	El Salvador	3062	
14	Stephanie Martins	Brazil	3058	
15	Pamela Pérez	Puerto Rico	3043	
16	Alicia Marcano	Venezuela	3006	
17	Taishaye Naranjo	Puerto Rico	2999	
18	Jessica Atan	Costa Rica	2952	
19	Zoriani Reyes	Puerto Rico	2929	
20	Vivian Luna	Dominican Republic	2922	
21	Karen Marcano	Venezuela	2916	
22	Roxana Fajardo	El Salvador	2904	
23	Verónica Valdebenito	Chile	2880	
24	Abigail Dammers	Aruba	2862	
25	María José Caro	Chile	2823	

=== Semifinals ===
The winner of each match advance to the final while the remaining athletes receive the bronze medal.

Rank	Nation	Athlete	Total	Notes
	Clara Guerrero	Colombia	678	Q
3rd place, bronze medalist(s)	Breanna Clemmer	United States	637	
	Juliana Franco	Colombia	655	Q
3rd place, bronze medalist(s)	Sandra Góngora	Mexico	605	

=== Final ===
Rank	Nation	Athlete	Total	Notes
1st place, gold medalist(s)	Clara Guerrero	Colombia	687	
2nd place, silver medalist(s)	Juliana Franco	Colombia	640	
