= Bowling at the 2017 World Games – Women's single =

Women's Single Bowling at the 2017 World Games
- Venue: Sky Tower
- Location: Wrocław, Poland
- Dates: 21 July
- Competitors: 16 from 11 nations

Medalists
gold medal	Laura Beuthner	Germany
silver medal	Clara Guerrero	Colombia
bronze medal	Kelly Kulick	United States

The Women's Single event of the Bowling at the 2017 World Games will be held on 21 July 2017.

== Single Women ==
=== Qualifications ===
Rank	Bowler	Nation	Score	Note
1	Laura Beuthner	Germany	1549	Q
2	Rocio Restrepo	Colombia	1486	Q
3	Birgit Poppler	Germany	1481	Q
4	Daria Pająk	Poland	1449	Q
5	Mirai Ishimoto	Japan	1449	Q
6	Kelly Kulick	United States	1402	Q
7	Kim Moon-jeong	South Korea	1389	Q
8	Joey Yeo	Singapore	1381	Q
9	Patricia De Faria	Venezuela	1380	Q
10	Kang Su-jin	South Korea	1369	Q
11	Danielle McEwan	United States	1361	Q
12	Clara Guerrero	Colombia	1338	Q
13	Karen Marcano	Venezuela	1337	Q
14	Sandra Góngora	Mexico	1333	Q
15	Daria Kovalova	Ukraine	1293	Q
16	Miranda Panas	Canada	1288	Q
17	Hikaru Takekawa	Japan	1272	
18	Jasmine Yeong-Nathan	Singapore	1260	
19	Eliisa Hiltunen	Finland	1256	
20	Sanna Pasanen	Finland	1254	
21	Valerie Bercier	Canada	1250	
22	Becky Daly	(United Kingdom) Great Britain	1242	
23	Britt Brøndsted	Denmark	1233	
24	Rikke H. Agerbo	Denmark	1228	
25	Tannya Lopez	Mexico	1185	
26	Samantha Hannan	(United Kingdom) Great Britain	1180	
27	Pan Yu-fen	Chinese Taipei	1179	
28	Tsai Hsin-yi	Chinese Taipei	1162	
29	Zhang Chunli	China	1161	
30	Lucyna Charezińska	Poland	1150	
31	Liliia Kononenko	Ukraine	1144	
32	Zhang Yuhong	China	1140	

=== Competition bracket ===
Round of 16
1	(Germany) Laura Beuthner	2
16	(Canada) Miranda Panas	1
9	(Venezuela) Patricia de Faria	2
8	(Singapore) Joey Yeo	1
12	(Colombia) Clara Guerrero	2
5	(Japan) Mirai Ishimoto	0
13	(Venezuela) Karen Marcano	0
4	(Poland) Daria Pająk	2
3	(Germany) Birgit Poppler	2
14	(Mexico) Sandra Góngora	1
11	(United States) Danielle McEwan	1
6	(United States) Kelly Kulick	2
7	(South Korea) Moonjeong Kim	2
10	(South Korea) Sujin Kang	0
15	(Ukraine) Daria Kovalova	2
2	(Colombia) Rocio Restrepo	1

Quarter-finals
1	(Germany) Laura Beuthner	2
9	(Venezuela) Patricia de Faria	0
12	(Colombia) Clara Guerrero	2
4	(Poland) Daria Pająk	0
3	(Germany) Birgit Poppler	1
6	(United States) Kelly Kulick	2
7	(South Korea) Moonjeong Kim	1
15	(Ukraine) Daria Kovalova	2

Semi-finals
1	(Germany) Laura Beuthner	2
12	(Colombia) Clara Guerrero	1
6	(United States) Kelly Kulick	2
15	(Ukraine) Daria Kovalova	0

Final
1	(Germany) Laura Beuthner	2
6	(United States) Kelly Kulick	0
Third place
12	(Colombia) Clara Guerrero	2
15	(Ukraine) Daria Kovalova	0

== Results ==
Rank	Fencer	Country
1st place, gold medalist(s)	Kelly Kulick	United States
2nd place, silver medalist(s)	Clara Guerrero	Colombia
3rd place, bronze medalist(s)	Daria Kovalova	Ukraine

In a competition doping test after the medal ceremony, Buethner tested positive for a banned substance. As a result of the positive doping test, Buethner was stripped of the gold medal. Kelly Kulick, who originally won silver, was awarded the gold medal. Clara Guerrero, who originally won bronze, was awarded the silver medal and Daria Kovalova, originally fourth in the final standings, was awarded the bronze medal.
