= Bowling at the 2005 World Games – Women's ten-pin singles =

Bowling women's ten-pin singles at the 2005 World Games
- Venue: RRZ / Bowling Center, Duisburg, Germany
- Date: 19–20 July 2005
- Competitors: 22 from 22 nations

Medalists
| gold medal | (South Korea) Kim Soo-kyung |
| silver medal | (United Kingdom) Zara Glover |
| bronze medal | (Canada) Caroline Lagrange |

The women's ten-pin singles event in bowling at the 2005 World Games took place from 19 to 20 July 2005 at the RRZ / Bowling Center in Duisburg, Germany.

== Competition format ==
A total of 22 athletes entered the competition. Best ten athletes from preliminary round qualifies to the round-robin. In round-robin each player plays ten matches. For a win player gets 10 points and for a draw 5 points. Total pins and bonus points are counted as final result. From this stage the best three athletes advances to the finals.

== Results ==
=== Preliminary ===
| Rank | Athlete | Nation | Result | Note |
|---|---|---|---|---|
| 1 | Kim Soo-kyung | South Korea | 5074 | Q |
| 2 | Ayano Katai | Japan | 4970 | Q |
| 3 | Piritta Kantola | Finland | 4944 | Q |
| 4 | Shalin Zulkifli | Malaysia | 4917 | Q |
| 5 | Caroline Lagrange | Canada | 4815 | Q |
| 6 | Zara Glover | (United Kingdom) Great Britain | 4814 | Q |
| 7 | Tsai Hsin-yi | Chinese Taipei | 4764 | Q |
| 8 | Aumi Guerra | Dominican Republic | 4734 | Q |
| 9 | Yvette Chen | Panama | 4731 | Q |
| 10 | Vanessa Fung | Hong Kong | 4721 | Q |
| 11 | Christina Foteinia | Greece | 4720 | |
| 12 | Jennifer Petrick | United States | 4700 | |
| 13 | Isabelle Saldjian | France | 4699 | |
| 14 | Liza del Rosario | Philippines | 4678 | |
| 15 | Yoselin Leon Garcia | Puerto Rico | 4623 | |
| 16 | Michaela Göbel | Germany | 4586 | |
| 17 | Ghislaine van der Tol | Netherlands | 4547 | |
| 18 | Kirsten Horemans | Belgium | 4547 | |
| 19 | Nardy Del Biondo | Venezuela | 4460 | |
| 20 | Sevcan Kilci | Turkey | 4424 | |
| 21 | Angkana Netriviseth | Thailand | 4416 | |
| 22 | Amanda Ng | Singapore | 4245 | |

=== Semifinal ===
| Rank | Athlete | Nation | Pins | Bonus | Result | Note |
|---|---|---|---|---|---|---|
| 1 | Kim Soo-kyung | South Korea | 2165 | 60 | 2225 | Q |
| 2 | Caroline Lagrange | Canada | 2110 | 40 | 2150 | Q |
| 3 | Zara Glover | (United Kingdom) Great Britain | 2086 | 50 | 2136 | Q |
| 4 | Vanessa Fung | Hong Kong | 2045 | 50 | 2095 | |
| 5 | Ayano Katai | Japan | 2010 | 70 | 2080 | |
| 6 | Aumi Guerra | Dominican Republic | 2021 | 50 | 2071 | |
| 7 | Yvette Chen | Panama | 1963 | 60 | 2023 | |
| 8 | Piritta Kantola | Finland | 1993 | 30 | 2023 | |
| 9 | Tsai Hsin-yi | Chinese Taipei | 1971 | 20 | 1991 | |
| 10 | Shalin Zulkifli | Malaysia | 1867 | 20 | 1887 | |

=== Finals ===
| Semifinal | | | Final |
| | | | 1 | (South Korea) Kim Soo-kyung | 416 |
| 3 | (United Kingdom) Zara Glover | 227 | 3 | (United Kingdom) Zara Glover | 415 |
| 2 | (Canada) Caroline Lagrange | 167 |
