= Bowling at the 2019 Pan American Games – Qualification =

The following is the qualification system and qualified countries for the Bowling at the 2019 Pan American Games competitions.

== Qualification system ==
A total of 64 bowlers will qualify to compete. Each nation may enter a maximum of 4 athletes (four per gender). In each gender there will be a total of 16 pairs qualified, with one spot per event (so a total of four bowlers) reserved for the host nation Peru. There will be a total of five qualification events. Each nation could only enter two qualification events per gender.

== Qualification timeline ==
Events	Date	Venue
2018 South American Games	May 26–30, 2018	(Bolivia) La Paz
2018 Central American and Caribbean Games	July 26–28, 2018	(Colombia) Barranquilla
PABCON Female Championships	September 22–29, 2018	(Dominican Republic) Santo Domingo
PABCON Champion of Champions	October 22–26, 2018	(Brazil) Rio de Janeiro
PABCON Male Championships	April 22–29, 2019	(Peru) Lima

== Qualification summary ==
Nation	Men		Women		Total
Nation	Individual	Doubles	Individual	Doubles	Bowlers
Argentina	2	X	2	X	4
Aruba	2	X	2	X	4
Bermuda	2	X	2	X	4
Brazil	2	X	2	X	4
Canada	2	X	2	X	4
Colombia	2	X	2	X	4
Costa Rica	2	X	2	X	4
Dominican Republic	2	X	2	X	4
Ecuador			2	X	2
El Salvador	2	X	2	X	4
Guatemala	2	X	2	X	4
Mexico	2	X	2	X	4
Panama	2	X			2
Peru	2	X	2	X	4
Puerto Rico	2	X	2	X	4
United States	2	X	2	X	4
Venezuela	2	X	2	X	4
Total: 17 NOCs	32	16	32	16	64

== Men ==
Event	Quotas	Qualified	Total bowlers
Host nation	1	Peru	2
South American Games	4	Venezuela; Colombia; Argentina; Brazil	8
Central American and Caribbean Games	4	Puerto Rico; Mexico; Costa Rica; Dominican Republic	8
PABCON Champion of Champions	5	United States; Canada; El Salvador; Guatemala; Aruba	10
PABCON Male Championship	2	Bermuda; Panama	4
TOTAL	16		32

== Women ==
Event	Quotas	Qualified	Total bowlers
Host nation	1	Peru	2
South American Games	4	Venezuela; Aruba; Colombia; Argentina	8
Central American and Caribbean Games	4	Mexico; Guatemala; Puerto Rico; Costa Rica	8
PABCON Female Championship	2	United States; Canada	4
PABCON Champion of Champions	5	Brazil; Dominican Republic; El Salvador; Bermuda; Ecuador	10
TOTAL	16		32
