= Bowling at the 2026 Central American and Caribbean Games =

- Venue: Sebelen Bowling Center
- Location: Santo Domingo, Dominican Republic
- Dates: 27–31 July

The bowling competition at the 2026 Central American and Caribbean Games was held in Santo Domingo, Dominican Republic, from 27 to 31 July at the Sebelen Bowling Center.

== Participating nations ==
A total of 11 nations qualified athletes. The number of athletes a nation entered is in parentheses beside the name of the country.

- Aruba (6)
- Bermuda (6)
- Colombia (12)
- Costa Rica (12)
- Dominican Republic (12)
- El Salvador (10)
- Guatemala (12)
- Mexico (12)
- Panama (12)
- Puerto Rico (12)
- Venezuela (12)

== Medal table ==
* Host nation (Dominican Republic)

Rank	Nation	Gold	Silver	Bronze	Total
1	Colombia (COL)	7	4	2	13
2	Mexico (MEX)	2	3	2	7
3	Venezuela (VEN)	1	1	1	3
4	Puerto Rico (PUR)	0	2	3	5
5	Dominican Republic (DOM)*	0	0	1	1
5	Guatemala (GUA)	0	0	1	1
Totals (6 entries)		10	10	10	30

== Medal summary ==
=== Men's events ===
Event	Gold	Silver	Bronze
Singles	Óscar Rodríguez; Colombia	Rodolfo Monacelli; Venezuela	Francisco Prats; Dominican Republic
Doubles	Mexico; Dante Romero; Ricardo Lecuona	Mexico; Mario Quintero; Héctor Piña	Guatemala; Diego Aguilar; Marvin León
Trios	Mexico; Marcelo Magrassi; Enrique Gutiérrez; Héctor Piña	Puerto Rico; David Márquez; Israel Hernández; Jean Pérez	Puerto Rico; Edgar Burgos; Jorge Rodríguez; Cristian Azcona
Team	Colombia; Jaime González; Sebastián Salazar; Alfredo Quintana; Edwar Rey; Oscar Rodríguez; Juan Hernández	Puerto Rico; David Márquez; Jorge Rodríguez; Israel Hernández; Cristian Azcona; Jean Pérez; Edgar Burgos	Mexico; Marcelo Magrassi; Dante Romero; Mario Quintero; Héctor Piña; Ricardo Lecuona; Enrique Gutiérrez
All individual events	Rodolfo Monacelli; Venezuela	Héctor Piña; Mexico	Jean Pérez; Puerto Rico

=== Women's events ===
Event	Gold	Silver	Bronze
Singles	María Rodríguez; Colombia	Juliana Botero; Colombia	Clara Guerrero; Colombia
Doubles	Colombia; Clara Guerrero; Juliana Franco	Colombia; Juliana Botero; María Rodríguez	Puerto Rico; Sarah Sanes; Zoriani Reyes
Trios	Colombia; Juliana Franco; Clara Guerrero; María Rodríguez	Colombia; Sara Duque; Laura Plazas; Juliana Botero	Mexico; Tannya López; Paola Limón; Iliana Lomeli
Team	Colombia; Sara Duque; Juliana Botero; Clara Guerrero; Juliana Franco; Laura Plazas; María Rodríguez	Mexico; Tannya López; Miriam Zetter; Sandra Góngora; Paola Limón; Iliana Lomeli; Lilia Robles	Venezuela; Patricia De Faria; Carmela Figuera; Joan González; Karen Marcano; Alicia Marcano; Gilant González
All individual events	María Rodríguez; Colombia	Juliana Franco; Colombia	Sara Duque; Colombia
