= Bowling at the 2014 Central American and Caribbean Games =

- Location: Veracruz, Mexico

The Bowling competition at the 2014 Central American and Caribbean Games was held in Veracruz, Mexico.

The tournament was scheduled to be held from 25–29 November at the Bolerama.

== Medal summary ==
=== Men's events ===
Event	Gold	Silver	Bronze
Masters	Jean Francisco Perez (PUR)	Mario Quintero (MEX)	Manuel Otalora (COL); Ildemaro Ruiz (VEN)
Singles	Francisco Prats (DOM)	Marco Moretti (CRC)	Mario Quintero (MEX)
Doubles	Puerto Rico (PUR); Cristian Azcona; Jean Francisco Perez	Mexico (MEX); Alejandro Cruz; Mario Quintero	Colombia (COL); Manuel Otalora; Jaime González
Trios	Venezuela (VEN); Ildemaro Ruiz; Amleto Monacelli; Eddy Fuentes	Puerto Rico (PUR); Jean Francisco Perez; Cristian Azcona; Israel Hernandez	Mexico (MEX); Mario Quintero; Alejandro Cruz; Humberto Vazquez
Teams of Five	Puerto Rico (PUR); Cristian Azcona; Israel Hernandez; Jean Francisco Perez; Javier Diaz; Francisco Colon	Venezuela (VEN); Ildemaro Ruiz; Amleto Monacelli; Giorgio Clinaz; Eddy Fuentes; Gonzalez Gonzalo	Mexico (MEX); Alejandro Cruz; Ricardo Lecuona; Humberto Vazquez; Mario Quintero; Marco Martinez
All Events	Ildemaro Ruiz (VEN)	Jean Francisco Perez (PUR)	Cristian Azcona (PUR)

=== Women's events ===
Event	Gold	Silver	Bronze
Masters	Sandra Góngora (MEX)	Kamilah Dammers (ARU)	Anggie Ramírez (COL); Aura Guerra (DOM)
Singles	Kamilah Dammers (ARU)	Miriam Zetter (MEX)	Aura Guerra (DOM)
Doubles	Colombia (COL); Anggie Ramírez; María Rodríguez	Venezuela (VEN); Patricia de Faria; Ingellimar Contreras	Mexico (MEX); Sandra Góngora; Miriam Zetter
Trios	Colombia (COL); Clara Guerrero; María Rodríguez; Rocio Restrepo	Mexico (MEX); Miriam Zetter; Sandra Góngora; Lilia Robles	Venezuela (VEN); Ingellimar Contreras; Esther Alvarez; Patricia de Faria
Teams of Five	Mexico (MEX); Lilia Robles; Miriam Zetter; Sandra Góngora; Iliana Lomeli; Adriana Ortega	Venezuela (VEN); Esther Alvarez; Ingellimar Contreras; Patricia de Faria; Alicia Marcano; Karen Marcano	Colombia (COL); María Rodríguez; Paola Gómez; Rocio Restrepo; Clara Guerrero; Anggie Ramírez
All Events	Kamilah Dammers (ARU)	Miriam Zetter (MEX)	Sandra Góngora (MEX)

== Medal table ==
* Host nation (Mexico)

Rank	Nation	Gold	Silver	Bronze	Total
1	Puerto Rico	3	2	1	6
2	Mexico*	2	5	5	12
3	Venezuela	2	3	2	7
4	Aruba	2	1	0	3
5	Colombia	2	0	4	6
6	Dominican Republic	1	0	2	3
7	Costa Rica	0	1	0	1
Totals (7 entries)		12	12	14	38
