= Bowling at the 2019 Pan American Games – Women's doubles =

Women's doubles at the 2019 Pan American Games
- Venue: Bowling Centre
- Dates: July 25–27, 2019
- Competitors: 32 from 16 nations
- Winning score: 5317

Medalists
Gold medal	Stefanie Johnson; Shannon O'Keefe	United States
Silver medal	Iliana Lomeli; Miriam Zetter	Mexico
Bronze medal	Aumi Guerra; Astrid Valiente	Dominican Republic

The women's doubles bowling competitions at the 2019 Pan American Games in Lima, Peru were held between 25 and 27 July 2019.

== Schedule ==
All times are in Peru Time (UTC-5).

Date	Time	Round	Ref.
25 July 2019	15:00	First Block (Games 1–6)	
27 July 2019	9:00	Second Block (Games (7–12)	

== Results ==
Rank	Nation	Athlete	Total	Grand Total
1st place, gold medalist(s)	United States	Stefanie Johnson; Shannon O'Keefe	2692; 2625	5317
2nd place, silver medalist(s)	Mexico	Iliana Lomeli; Miriam Zetter	2416; 2637	5053
3rd place, bronze medalist(s)	Dominican Republic	Aumi Guerra; Astrid Valiente	2486; 2528	5014
4	Puerto Rico	Taishaye Naranjo; Sarah Sanes	2558; 2409	4967
5	Aruba	Kamilah Dammers; Thashaïna Seraus	2455; 2489	4944
6	Colombia	Clara Guerrero; María Rodríguez	2399; 2508	4907
7	Venezuela	Patricia de Faria; Karen Marcano	2366; 2496	4862
8	Canada	Valerie Bercier; Miranda Panas	2552; 2216	4768
9	Guatemala	Ana Bolaños; Sofia Granda	2272; 2455	4722
10	Costa Rica	Viviana Delgado; Ericka Quesada	2318; 2404	4628
11	Brazil	Stephanie Martins; Roberta Rodrigues	2368; 2260	4628
12	Peru	Yumi Yuzuriha; Gabriela Ishikawa	2148; 2238	4386
13	Argentina	Gabriela Lanzavecchia; Vanesa Rinke	1960; 2359	4178
14	Ecuador	Dennise Quezada; Diana Rosero	2119; 2059	4178
15	El Salvador	Edith Quintanilla; Sandra Quintanilla	2158; 2019	4177
16	Bermuda	June Dill; Patrice Tucker	1924; 2017	3941
