= Bowling at the 2013 Bolivarian Games =

Bowling (Spanish: Boliche), for the 2013 Bolivarian Games, took place from 23 November to 28 November 2013.

== Medal table ==
Rank	Nation	Gold	Silver	Bronze	Total
1	Colombia (COL)	7	7	2	16
2	Venezuela (VEN)	6	5	5	16
3	Panama (PAN)	2	1	5	8
4	Ecuador (ECU)	0	2	1	3
5	Guatemala (GUA)	0	0	4	4
Totals (5 entries)		15	15	17	47

== Medalists ==
Event	Gold		Silver		Bronze	
Men's singles	Juan Carlos Narvaes (PAN)	231.83	Reydnier Jose Chavez Forner (VEN)	231.00	Jose Gaston Zambrano (ECU)	227.00
Men's doubles	Venezuela; Richard Leon; Reydnier Jose Chavez Forner	237.33	Colombia; Jaime González; Santiago Mejía	223.58	Venezuela; Luis Rovaina; Ildemaro Ruiz	222.33
Men's triplet	Panama; Ronnie Rodriguez; Carlos Torres; Juan Carlos Narvaes	3890	Ecuador; Diogenes Jose Saverio Borja; Mario Guillermo Lemos Bayas; Jose Gaston Zambrano	3855	Venezuela; Richard Leon; Ildemaro Ruiz; Reydnier Jose Chavez Forner	3849
Men's quartet	Colombia; Andrés Gómez; Jaime González; Santiago Mejía; Manuel Otalora	218.79	Venezuela; Reydnier Jose Chavez Forner; Richard Leon; Luis Rovaina; Ildemaro Ruiz	212.63	Panama; Jonathan Heres; Juan Carlos Narvaes; Ronnie Rodriguez; Carlos Torres	210.58
Men's masters final	Richard Leon (VEN)	n/a	Manuel Otalora (COL)	n/a	Jaime González (COL); Juan Carlos Narvaes (PAN)	n/a
Men's total event singles	Richard Leon (VEN)	226.79	Juan Carlos Narvaes (PAN)	226.42	Jaime González (COL)	222.08
Men's team total event	Venezuela; Reydnier Jose Chavez Forner; Richard Leon; Luis Rovaina; Ildemaro Ruiz	20,943	Colombia; Andrés Gómez; Jaime González; Santiago Mejía; Manuel Otalora	20,822	Panama; Jonathan Heres; Juan Carlos Narvaes; Ronnie Rodriguez; Carlos Torres	19,859
Women's singles	Clara Guerrero (COL)	242.17	Karen Marcano (VEN)	233.33	Sofia Matilde Rodriguez Granda (GUA)	225.00
Women's doubles	Colombia; Clara Guerrero; Rocio Restrepo	221.33	Colombia; María Rodríguez; Johanna Puentes	210.42	Venezuela; Karen Marcano; Alicia Marcano	204.50
Women's triplet	Colombia; Clara Guerrero; Rocio Restrepo; María Rodríguez	3844	Venezuela; Karen Marcano; Alicia Marcano; Patricia Vanessa de Faria Zamudio	3675	Panama; Yvette Chen; Edissa Andrade; Tilcia Lancini	3382
Women's quartet	Venezuela; Joan Gonzalez; Patricia Vanessa de Faria Zamudio; Karen Marcano; Alicia Marcano	219.29	Colombia; Johanna Puentes; María Rodríguez; Rocio Restrepo; Clara Guerrero	210.25	Panama; Lizzette Abbod; Tilcia Lancini; Edissa Andrade; Yvette Chen	188.92
Women's masters final	Clara Guerrero (COL)	n/a	María Rodríguez (COL)	n/a	Sofia Matilde Rodriguez Granda (GUA); Alicia Marcano (VEN)	n/a
Women's total event singles	Clara Guerrero (COL)	221.42	Rocio Restrepo (COL)	220.96	Alicia Marcano (VEN)	219.54
Women's team total event	Colombia; Johanna Puentes; Clara Guerrero; Rocio Restrepo; María Rodríguez	20,401	Venezuela; Patricia Vanessa de Faria Zamudio; Joan Gonzalez; Karen Marcano; Alicia Marcano	20,039	Guatemala; Laura Lucia Barrios Ruiz; Ana Lorena Bolaños Molina; Pamela Maria Monzon Godoy; Sofia Matilde Rodriguez Granda	18,422
Mixed doubles	Venezuela; Luis Rovaina; Joan Gonzalez	2439	Ecuador; Erika Ornella Saverio Borja; Ivan Andres Vallejo Cabrera	2364	Guatemala; Armando David Batres Reyes; Sofia Matilde Rodriguez Granda	2345
