= Bowling at the 2003 Pan American Games =

This page shows the results of the Bowling Competition for men and women at the 2003 Pan American Games, held from August 1 to August 17, 2003, in Santo Domingo, Dominican Republic.

== Men's competition ==
=== Singles ===
RANK	FINAL	AVERAGE
Gold medal	Daniel Falconi (MEX)	217,25
Silver medal	Marcos Baeza (MEX)	212,92
Bronze medal	Bill Hoffman (USA)	212,67
4.	Danyck Brière (CAN)	209,67
4.	Andrés Gómez (COL)	209,67
6.	Diego Fernández (GUA)	205,92
7.	Roberto Baranano (URU)	205,67
8.	Arturo Hernandez (VEN)	205,33
9.	Fábio Rezende (BRA)	203,42
10.	Scott Pohl (USA)	201,25
11.	José Méndez (GUA)	201,00
12.	Rolando Sebelen (DOM)	200,92
13.	Manuel Zambrano (PAN)	200,25
14.	Luis Marrero (PUR)	199,17
14.	Pedro Cardoza (VEN)	199,17
16.	David Romero (COL)	199,00
17.	Hilton Núñez (DOM)	196,33
18.	Jose Avendano (PAN)	195,42
19.	Francisco Colon (PUR)	194,83
20.	Walter Costa (BRA)	192,67
21.	Lucas Legnani (ARG)	189,92
22.	George Lambert (CAN)	188,67
23.	Alejandro Reyna (CRC)	188,25
24.	Juan Azar (ECU)	187,92
25.	Luis Barquis (URU)	187,58
26.	Antoine Jones (BER)	186,75
27.	Steven Riley (BER)	183,92
27.	Juan Araya (CHI)	183,92
29.	Ruben Favero (ARG)	178,83
30.	Mario Valverde (CRC)	178,33
31.	Errol Brown (ARU)	175,67
32.	José Zambrano (ECU)	175,17

=== Doubles ===
RANK	FINAL	AVERAGE
Gold medal	United States • Bill Hoffman • Scott Pohl	209,17
Silver medal	Canada • Danyck Brière • George Lambert	203,79
Bronze medal	Colombia • Andrés Gómez • David Romero	203,21

== Women's competition ==
=== Singles ===
RANK	FINAL	AVERAGE
Gold medal	Shannon Pluhowsky (USA)	204,92
Silver medal	Sofia Granda (GUA)	202,00
Bronze medal	Clara Guerrero (COL)	200,67
4.	Margalit Mizrachi (VEN)	199,50
5.	Adriana Pérez (MEX)	196,00
6.	Sara Vargas (COL)	194,00
7.	Maria Ramirez (CRC)	193,00
8.	Illiana Lomeli (MEX)	192,83
9.	Aumi Guerra (DOM)	190,00
10.	Annie Henriquez (DOM)	187,42
11.	Yoselin Garcia (PUR)	187,25
12.	Michelle Ayala (PUR)	
13.	Stacy Werth (USA)	186,67
14.	Dianne Ingham (BER)	186,08
15.	Jennifer Willis (CAN)	185,42
15.	Ghiselle Araujo (CRC)	185,42
17.	Jacqueline Costa (BRA)	184,17
18.	Laura Lanzavecchia (ARG)	183,50
19.	Robin Crawford (CAN)	182,92
20.	June Dill (BER)	181,08
21.	Luiza Rocha (BRA)	179,00
22.	Eloina Valle (HON)	178,42
23.	Marta Quinteros (ARG)	176,50
24.	Mirna Tabormina (CHI)	176,08
25.	Ely Bennett (PAN)	175,17
26.	Karen Holder (PAN)	172,25
27.	Marina McClain (BAH)	172,00
28.	Patricia Ciotti (VEN)	168,00
29.	Renatha Arnold (ARU)	162,50
30.	Maria Castillo (GUA)	161,92
31.	Susette Croes (ARU)	158,67
32.	Joanna Whiteside-Powell (BAH)	—

=== Doubles ===
RANK	FINAL	AVERAGE
Gold medal	Mexico • Iliana Lomeli • Adriana Pérez	200,29
Silver medal	United States • Shannon Pluhowsky • Stacy Werth	196,46
Bronze medal	Colombia • Sara Vargas • Clara Guerrero	195,92
4.	Puerto Rico • Michelle Ayala • Yoselin Leon	190,96
5.	Canada • Jennifer Willis • Robin Crawford	187,67
6.	Costa Rica • Maria Ramirez • Gishelle Araujo	186,63
7.	Brazil • Jacqueline Costa • Luiz Rocha	185,21
8.	Bermuda • Diane Ingham • June Dill	182,88
9.	Venezuela • Margalit Mizrachi • Patricia Ciotti	182,79
10.	Dominican Republic • Aumi Guerra • Annie Henriquez	180,88
11.	Panama • Karen Holder • Ely Bennett	171,50
12.	Guatemala • Sofia Granda • Maria Castillo	171,29
13.	Bahamas • Joanna Woodside • Marina McClain	169,21
14.	Argentina • Laura Lanzavecchia • Marta Quinteros	168,33
15.	Aruba • Renatha Arnold • Susette Croes	164,13

== Medal table ==
Place	Nation	Gold medal	Silver medal	Bronze medal	Total
1	United States	2	1	1	4
2	Mexico	2	1	0	3
3	Canada	0	1	0	1
3	Guatemala	0	1	0	1
5	Colombia	0	0	3	3
Total		4	4	4	12
