= Bowling at the 2015 Pan American Games – Qualification =

== Qualification criteria ==
A total of 56 bowlers will qualify to compete at the Games. Each country is allowed to enter a maximum of two male and two female athletes. Each gender has a quota of 14 nations (28 bowlers) for a total of 56 athletes.

== Qualification timeline ==
Event	Date	Venue
2014 South American Games	March 10 – 14, 2014	(Chile) Santiago
Pan American Sports Festival	July 17 – 20, 2014	(Mexico) Puebla
2014 PABCON Women's Championship	September 13 – 16, 2014	(Colombia) Cali
2014 Central American and Caribbean Games	November 25 – 29, 2014	(Mexico) Veracruz

== Qualification summary ==
Nation	Men		Women		Total
Nation	Individual	Doubles	Individual	Doubles	Bowlers
Argentina	2	X	2	X	4
Aruba	2	X	2	X	4
Brazil	2	X	2	X	4
Canada	2	X	2	X	4
Chile			2	X	2
Colombia	2	X	2	X	4
Costa Rica	2	X	2	X	4
Dominican Republic	2	X	2	X	4
El Salvador	2	X	2	X	4
Guatemala	2	X	2	X	4
Mexico	2	X	2	X	4
Panama	2	X			2
Puerto Rico	2	X	2	X	4
United States	2	X	2	X	4
Venezuela	2	X	2	X	4
Total: 15 NOCs	28	14	28	14	56

== Men ==
Event	Vacancies	Qualified	Bowlers per NOC	Total
Host nation	1	Canada	2	2
South American Games	4	Colombia; Venezuela; Argentina; Brazil	2	8
Pan American Sports Festival	7	United States; Mexico; Costa Rica; Puerto Rico; Dominican Republic; Panama; Aruba	2	14
Central American and Caribbean Games	2	El Salvador; Guatemala	2	4
TOTAL				28

== Women ==
Event	Vacancies	Qualified	Bowlers per NOC	Total
Host nation	1	Canada	2	2
South American Games	4	Colombia; Venezuela; Argentina; Chile	2	8
Pan American Sports Festival	3	Mexico; Brazil; Costa Rica	2	6
PABCON Women's Championship	4	United States; Aruba; Puerto Rico; Dominican Republic	2	8
Central American and Caribbean Games	2	El Salvador; Guatemala	2	4
TOTAL				28
