= Bowling at the 2011 Pan American Games – Women's pairs =

Women's pairs at the 2011 Pan American Games
- Venue: Bolearmo Tapatio
- Dates: October 24 – 25

Medalists
Gold medal	Liz Johnson; Kelly Kulick	United States
Silver medal	Sandra Góngora; Miriam Zetter	Mexico
Bronze medal	Anggie Ramírez; María Rodríguez	Colombia

The women's pairs competition of the bowling events at the 2011 Pan American Games took place between from October 24 to 25 at the Bolearmo Tapatio.

The participants each bowled a total of twelve games, six on each day. At the end of play, the scores were totalled and averaged, and the pair with the highest grand total won the gold medal.

== Results ==
Nation	Player	Block 1 (Games 1–6)									Block 2 (Games 7–12)								Grand Total	Final Rank
Nation	Player	1	2	3	4	5	6	Total	Average	Rank	7	8	9	10	11	12	Total	Average	Grand Total	Final Rank
United States	Liz Johnson	213	203	225	248	194	211	1294	215.7	1	279	203	208	214	222	213	2633	219.4	5257	1st place, gold medalist(s)
United States	Kelly Kulick	228	202	196	236	206	224	1292	215.3	1	193	209	247	270	223	190	2624	218.7	5257	1st place, gold medalist(s)
Mexico	Sandra Góngora	186	211	193	233	174	186	1183	197.2	6	245	215	170	233	247	236	2529	210.8	4929	2nd place, silver medalist(s)
Mexico	Miriam Zetter	178	178	177	186	230	171	1120	186.7	6	201	256	238	228	184	173	2400	200.0	4929	2nd place, silver medalist(s)
Colombia	Anggie Ramírez	196	232	203	186	269	148	1234	205.7	2	216	163	211	208	202	220	2454	204.5	4851	3rd place, bronze medalist(s)
Colombia	María Rodríguez	193	187	192	180	207	178	1137	189.5	2	215	180	227	215	192	231	2397	199.8	4851	3rd place, bronze medalist(s)
Canada	Caroline Lagrange	176	234	209	204	194	158	1175	195.8	3	195	233	267	256	225	190	2541	211.8	4827	4
Canada	Jennifer Park	190	188	224	210	190	190	1192	198.7	3	206	166	187	166	167	202	2286	190.5	4827	4
Venezuela	Patricia de Faria	173	167	210	177	211	176	1114	185.7	7	204	201	190	207	214	222	2352	196.0	4813	5
Venezuela	Karen Marcano	186	185	179	226	191	179	1146	191.0	7	188	222	211	219	257	218	2461	205.1	4813	5
Dominican Republic	Aura Guerra	141	181	184	135	231	190	1062	177.0	8	211	176	234	237	213	204	2337	194.8	4586	6
Dominican Republic	Maria Vilas	212	174	205	178	186	169	1124	187.3	8	159	157	149	193	276	191	2249	187.4	4586	6
Guatemala	Sofia Rodriguez	211	201	193	183	204	214	1206	201.0	4	204	222	208	188	180	185	2393	199.4	4577	7
Guatemala	Ximena Soto	192	202	173	196	194	191	1148	191.3	4	179	197	164	191	146	159	2184	182.0	4577	7
Chile	Constanza Bahamondez	204	203	190	187	189	210	1183	197.2	5	161	153	137	187	188	161	2170	180.8	4464	8
Chile	Andrea Rojas	224	192	168	189	177	182	1132	188.7	5	170	205	209	175	224	179	2294	191.2	4464	8
Aruba	Kamilah Dammers	168	168	168	201	142	147	994	165.7	11	197	247	185	171	175	206	2175	181.3	4446	9
Aruba	Thashaïna Seraus	155	165	184	178	216	221	1119	186.5	11	202	194	173	146	195	242	2271	189.3	4446	9
Brazil	Stephanie Martins	189	171	178	207	209	158	1112	185.3	10	181	166	222	184	188	170	2223	185.3	4437	10
Brazil	Marizete Scheer	226	140	139	171	171	174	1021	170.2	10	183	268	175	198	191	178	2214	184.5	4437	10
Puerto Rico	Mariana Ayala	199	150	159	177	160	178	1023	170.5	13	171	157	195	223	211	135	2115	176.3	4265	11
Puerto Rico	Yoselin Leon	158	183	172	179	171	158	1021	170.2	13	180	193	164	189	227	176	2150	179.2	4265	11
Costa Rica	Maria Delgado	212	178	188	186	236	205	1205	200.8	9	184	155	171	181	161	164	2221	185.1	4253	12
Costa Rica	Maria Villalobos	143	158	156	177	154	158	946	157.7	9	170	180	193	193	164	186	2032	169.3	4253	12
Peru	Veronica Delgado	167	150	183	178	140	174	992	165.3	15	161	189	160	188	185	237	2112	176.0	4180	13
Peru	Connie Seragaki	115	179	194	157	181	176	1002	167.0	15	160	193	212	159	178	164	2068	172.3	4180	13
El Salvador	Carmen Granillo	166	135	162	199	175	171	1008	168.0	12	191	134	170	159	197	191	2050	170.8	4116	14
El Salvador	Eugenia Quintanilla	180	175	173	167	169	191	1055	175.8	12	194	150	149	156	171	191	2066	172.2	4116	14
Bermuda	Gloria Dill	162	188	153	158	179	176	1016	169.3	14	198	147	200	176	157	180	2074	172.8	4003	15
Bermuda	Dianne Jones	190	177	144	177	162	146	996	166.0	14	144	159	191	146	118	175	1929	160.8	4003	15
Bahamas	Justina Sturrup	142	138	159	124	171	182	916	152.7	16	158	143	169	143	154	141	1824	152.0	3784	16
Bahamas	Joanne Woodside	151	169	163	210	141	155	989	164.8	16	155	117	189	166	164	180	1960	163.3	3784	16
