= Bowling at the 2001 World Games – Women's singles =

Bowling women's singles at the 2001 World Games
- Venue: Utenayu Bowl, Yokote, Japan
- Date: 22–23 August 2001
- Competitors: 24 from 23 nations

Medalists
gold medal	(Guatemala) Sofía Rodríguez
silver medal	(Netherlands) Ross Greiner
bronze medal	(Finland) Piritta Kantola

The women's singles event in bowling at the 2001 World Games took place from 22 to 23 August 2001 at the Utenayu Bowl in Yokote, Japan.

== Competition format ==
A total of 24 athletes entered the competition. Best ten athletes from preliminary round qualifies to the round-robin. In round-robin each player plays ten matches. For a win player gets 10 points and for a draw 5 points. Total pins and bonus points are counted as final result. From this stage the best three athletes advances to the finals.

== Results ==
=== Preliminary ===
Rank	Athlete	Nation	Result	Note
1	Piritta Kantola	Finland	3724	Q
2	Kirsten Penny	(United Kingdom) Great Britain	3696	Q
3	Wang Yu-ling	Chinese Taipei	3654	Q
4	Nam Bo-ra	South Korea	3648	Q
5	Tanya Petty	Germany	3642	Q
6	Shannon Pluhowsky	United States	3615	Q
7	Ross Greiner	Netherlands	3594	Q
8	Cecilia Yap	Philippines	3550	Q
9	Sofía Rodríguez	Guatemala	3525	Q
10	Mette Hansen	Norway	3522	Q
11	Shalin Zulkifli	Malaysia	3480	
12	Clara Guerrero	Colombia	3471	
13	Kaori Daimaruya	Japan	3464	
14	Jennifer Willis	Canada	3433	
15	Inngellimar Contreras	Venezuela	3409	
16	Isabelle Saldjian	France	3387	
17	Felicidad Mandapat	Guam	3366	
18	Vanessa Fung	Hong Kong	3298	
19	Leng Tan Bee	Singapore	3294	
20	Aumi Guerra	Dominican Republic	3251	
21	Susan Thomas	(United Kingdom) Great Britain	3139	
22	Miriam Ayala	Puerto Rico	3088	
23	Tatiana Valdes	Peru	2682	
24	Gabriella Casadei	San Marino	2662	

=== Semifinal ===
Rank	Athlete	Nation	Pins	Bonus	Result	Note
1	Ross Greiner	Netherlands	2182	50	2232	Q
2	Sofía Rodríguez	Guatemala	2142	70	2212	Q
3	Piritta Kantola	Finland	2145	50	2195	Q
4	Nam Bo-ra	South Korea	2102	80	2182	
5	Wang Yu-ling	Chinese Taipei	2083	55	2138	
6	Kirsten Penny	(United Kingdom) Great Britain	2030	45	2075	
7	Tanya Petty	Germany	1996	40	2036	
8	Shannon Pluhowsky	United States	1983	40	2023	
9	Cecilia Yap	Philippines	1924	50	1974	
10	Mette Hansen	Norway	1874	20	1894	

=== Finals ===
Semifinal			Final
			1	(Netherlands) Ross Greiner	360
3	(Finland) Piritta Kantola	169	2	(Guatemala) Sofía Rodríguez	421
2	(Guatemala) Sofía Rodríguez	180
