= Bowling at the 2018 Central American and Caribbean Games =

- Venue: Bolera de Cali
- Location: (Colombia) Cali
- Dates: 26 July – 2 August

The bowling competition at the 2018 Central American and Caribbean Games was held from 26 July to 2 August at the Bolera de Cali in Cali, Colombia .

== Medal summary ==
=== Men's events ===
Event	Gold	Silver	Bronze
Singles	Óscar Rodríguez (COL)	Francisco Valiente (PUR)	Ildemaro Ruíz (VEN)
Doubles	Venezuela (VEN); Luis Rovaina; Ildemaro Ruíz	Puerto Rico (PUR); Cristian Azcona; Jean Pérez	Costa Rica (CRC); Jonaykel Conejo; Rodolfo Madriz
Trios	Colombia (COL); Manuel Otalora; Óscar Rodríguez; Andrés Gómez	Bermuda (BER); Damien Matthews; Rickai Binns; David Maycock	Costa Rica (CRC); Marco Moretti; Jonaykel Conejo; Rodolfo Madriz
Quintets	Puerto Rico (PUR); Andraunick Simounet; Francisco Valiente; Israel Hernández; Jean Pérez; Cristian Azcona; Javier Diaz	Colombia (COL); Manuel Otalora; Edwar Rey; Jaime González; Óscar Rodríguez; Andrés Gómez; Santiago Mejía	Mexico (MEX); Enrique Gutiérrez; Arturo Quintero; Ricardo Lecuona; Humberto Vázquez; Jesús Lecona; Luis Kassian
Master Final	Luis Rovaina (VEN)	Cristian Azcona (PUR)	Marco Moretti (CRC) Jean Pérez (PUR)

=== Women's events ===
Event	Gold	Silver	Bronze
Singles	Thashaina Seraus (ARU)	Sofia Rodríguez (GUA)	Rocio Restrepo (COL)
Doubles	Colombia (COL); Rocio Restrepo; Clara Guerrero	Mexico (MEX); Maribel Orozco; Sandra Góngora	Mexico (MEX); Lilia Robles; Miriam Zetter
Trios	Colombia (COL); Anggie Ramírez; Laura Plazas; María Rodríguez	Mexico (MEX); Maribel Orozco; Adriana Pérez; Iliana Lomeli	Mexico (MEX); Miriam Zetter; Lilia Robles; Sandra Góngora
Quintets	Mexico (MEX); Miriam Zetter; Iliana Lomeli; Maribel Orozco; Adriana Pérez; Sandra Góngora; Lilia Robles	Colombia (COL); Laura Plazas; Anggie Ramírez; Clara Guerrero; Juliana Franco; María Rodríguez; Rocio Restrepo	Aruba (ARU); Abigail Dammers; Jeadine Luidens; Kamilah Dammers; Thashaina Seraus; Vanessa Valdes; Xanthe Lobbrecht
Master Final	Rocio Restrepo (COL)	Juliana Franco (COL)	Sandra Góngora (MEX) Thashaina Seraus (ARU)

== Medal table ==
* Host nation (Colombia)

Rank	Nation	Gold	Silver	Bronze	Total
1	Colombia (COL)*	5	3	1	9
2	Venezuela (VEN)	2	0	1	3
3	Mexico (MEX)	1	2	4	7
4	Aruba (ARU)	1	0	2	3
5	Bermuda (BER)	0	1	0	1
5	Guatemala (GUA)	0	1	0	1
Totals (6 entries)		9	7	8	24
