= Bowling at the 2010 Central American and Caribbean Games =

- Location: Mayagüez, Puerto Rico
- Dates: 19–25 July

The Bowling competition at the 2010 Central American and Caribbean Games was held in Mayagüez, Puerto Rico.

The tournament was scheduled to be held from 19–25 July at the Bolera Caribe in Ponce.

== Medal summary ==
=== Men's events ===
| Event | Gold | Silver | Bronze |
|---|---|---|---|
| Masters | Andraunick Simounet (PUR) | Armando Batres (GUA) | Luis Olivo (VEN); Gabriel Sanchez (PUR) |
| Singles | Luis Olivo (VEN) | Manuel Otalora (COL) | Damien Matthews (BER) |
| All events | Jose Miguel Estrada (DOM) | Andrés Gómez (COL) | Alejandro Reyna (CRC) |
| Doubles | Dominican Republic; Jose Miguel Estrada, Francisco Prats | Colombia; Andrés Gómez, Manuel Otalora | Colombia Fabio García, Juan Rodríguez; Venezuela Rafael Medina, Ildemaro Ruiz |
| Trios | Puerto Rico | Mexico | Dominican Republic |
| Teams of Five | Venezuela | Colombia | Puerto Rico |

=== Women's events ===
| Event | Gold | Silver | Bronze |
|---|---|---|---|
| Masters | Karen Marcano (VEN) | Iliana Lomeli (MEX) | Sandra Góngora (MEX); Clara Guerrero (COL) |
| Singles | Rocio Restrepo (COL) | Sofia Rodriguez (GUA) | Clara Guerrero (COL) |
| All events | Rocio Restrepo (COL) | Iliana Lomeli (MEX) | Clara Guerrero (COL) |
| Doubles | Dominican Republic; Aura Guerra, María Vilas | Puerto Rico; Michelle Ayala, Mariangie Colón | Colombia; Clara Guerrero, Rocio Restrepo |
| Trios | Colombia | Venezuela | Colombia |
| Teams of Five | Venezuela | Mexico | Colombia |

=== Mixed events ===
| Event | Gold | Silver | Bronze |
|---|---|---|---|
| Doubles | Colombia | Venezuela | Mexico |
