= Bowling at the 2023 Pan American Games – Qualification =

The following is the qualification system and qualified countries for the Bowling at the 2023 Pan American Games competitions.

== Qualification system ==
A total of 50 bowlers will qualify to compete. Each nation may enter a maximum of 4 athletes (two per gender). The champions of the 2021 Junior Pan American Games will only be able to compete in the individual events of the Santiago 2023 Pan American Games. If the athletes who qualified at the Cali 2021 Junior Pan American Games do not participate in the Santiago 2023 Pan American Games, this spot will be nominal blocked and cannot be transferred to another NOC or athlete. Qualified athletes at the Cali 2021 Junior Pan American Games will not be able to obtain another slot for their NOC; however, another athlete may compete for another slot through the Santiago 2023 qualification system within the maximum quota per NOC. In each gender there will be a total of 12 pairs qualified, with one spot per event (so a total of four bowlers) reserved for the host nation Chile. There will be a total of four qualification events. Each nation could only enter two qualification events per gender.

== Qualification timeline ==
Events	Date	Venue
2021 Junior Pan American Games	November 28–30, 2021	(Colombia) Cali
PABCON Champion of Champions	August 28 – September 4, 2022	(Brazil) Rio de Janeiro
2022 South American Games	October 9–12, 2022	(Paraguay) Asunción
PABCON Female Championships	October 22–29, 2022	(Peru) Lima
PABCON Male Championships	May 2023	(Dominican Republic) Santo Domingo
2023 Central American and Caribbean Games	June 23 – July 8, 2023	(El Salvador) San Salvador

== Qualification summary ==
Nation	Men		Women		Total
Nation	Individual	Doubles	Individual	Doubles	Bowlers
Aruba			2	X	2
Brazil	2	X	2	X	4
Canada	2	X			2
Chile	2	X	2	X	4
Colombia	2	X	2	X	4
Dominican Republic	2	X			2
Ecuador	2	X			2
El Salvador			2	X	2
Guatemala			2	X	2
Mexico			2	X	2
Puerto Rico	3	X	3	X	6
United States	2	X	2	X	4
Venezuela	2	X	2	X	4
Total: 13 NOCs	25	12	25	12	50

== Men ==
Event	Quotas	Qualified	Total bowlers
Host nation	1	Chile	2
Junior Pan American Games	1	Edgar Burgos Quiñones (PUR)	1
PABCON Champion of Champions	3	United States; Canada; Brazil	6
South American Games	3	Colombia; Venezuela; Ecuador	6
PABCON Male Championships	2	Puerto Rico; Dominican Republic	4
Central American and Caribbean Games	3		6
TOTAL	13		25

== Women ==
Event	Quotas	Qualified	Total bowlers
Host nation	1	Chile	2
Junior Pan American Games	1	Taishaye Quiara (PUR)	1
PABCON Champion of Champions	3	United States; Mexico; Brazil	6
South American Games	3	Aruba; Colombia; Venezuela	6
PABCON Female Championships	2	Guatemala; Puerto Rico	4
Central American and Caribbean Games	3	El Salvador	6
TOTAL	13		25
