= Bowling at the 2011 Pan American Games =

- Venue: Tapatío Bowling Alley
- Dates: October 24 – October 27
- Competitors: 64 from 18 nations

The Bowling competition of the 2011 Pan American Games in Guadalajara, Mexico will be held at the Tapatío Bowling Alley from October 24 to October 27. There will be 4 events contested two each for men and women.

== Medal summary ==
=== Medal table ===
| Rank | Nation | Gold | Silver | Bronze | Total |
|---|---|---|---|---|---|
| 1 | United States | 3 | 1 | 0 | 4 |
| 2 | Colombia | 1 | 0 | 2 | 3 |
| 3 | Canada | 0 | 1 | 1 | 2 |
| 3 | Venezuela | 0 | 1 | 1 | 2 |
| 5 | Mexico | 0 | 1 | 0 | 1 |
| 6 | Brazil | 0 | 0 | 1 | 1 |
| 6 | Dominican Republic | 0 | 0 | 1 | 1 |
| Totals (7 entries) | | 4 | 4 | 6 | 14 |

=== Events ===
| Event | Gold | Silver | Bronze |
|---|---|---|---|
| Men's individual | Santiago Mejía; Colombia | Chris Barnes; United States | Marcelo Suartz; Brazil |
| Men's individual | Santiago Mejía; Colombia | Chris Barnes; United States | Manuel Fernandez; Dominican Republic |
| Women's individual | Elizabeth Johnson; United States | Jennifer Park; Canada | Caroline Lagrange; Canada |
| Women's individual | Elizabeth Johnson; United States | Jennifer Park; Canada | Karen Marcano; Venezuela |
| Men's pairs | United States; William O'Neil; Chris Barnes | Venezuela; José Lander; Amleto Monacelli | Colombia; Santiago Mejía; Andrés Gómez |
| Women's pairs | United States; Elizabeth Johnson; Kelly Kulick | Mexico; Sandra Góngora; Miriam Zetter | Colombia; Anggie Ramírez; María Rodríguez |

== Schedule ==
All times are Central Daylight Time (UTC-5).

| Day | Date | Start | Finish | Event | Phase |
|---|---|---|---|---|---|
| Day 11 | Monday October 24, 2011 | 8:30 | 13:30 | Women's pairs | Preliminaries |
| Day 11 | Monday October 24, 2011 | 8:30 | 13:30 | Men's pairs | Preliminaries |
| Day 12 | Tuesday October 25, 2011 | 8:30 | 13:30 | Women's pairs | Preliminaries/Medal matches |
| Day 12 | Tuesday October 25, 2011 | 8:30 | 13:30 | Men's pairs | Preliminaries/Medal matches |
| Day 13 | Wednesday October 26, 2011 | 8:30 | 18:00 | Women's singles | Preliminaries |
| Day 13 | Wednesday October 26, 2011 | 8:30 | 18:00 | Men's singles | Preliminaries |
| Day 14 | Thursday October 27, 2011 | 7:00 | 17:00 | Women's singles | Elimination/Medal matches |
| Day 14 | Thursday October 27, 2011 | 7:00 | 17:00 | Men's singles | Elimination/Medal matches |

== Qualification ==
The qualifier was the 2009 PABCON Senior Pan American Championship. It was held in San Juan, Puerto Rico between September 20–27, 2009 in which fifteen countries in both men’s and women’s categories qualified. Mexico, as the host country of the Games, automatically qualified to participate in both categories. A National Olympic Committee (NOC) may enter up to 2 athlete per gender. There is a maximum of 64 competitors allowed (32 per gender).

| Nation | Men's Individual | Men's Pair | Women's Individual | Women's Pair | Total |
|---|---|---|---|---|---|
| Aruba | | | 2 | X | 2 |
| Bahamas | | | 2 | X | 2 |
| Bermuda | 2 | X | 2 | X | 4 |
| Bolivia | 2 | X | | | 2 |
| Brazil | 2 | X | 2 | X | 4 |
| Canada | 2 | X | 2 | X | 4 |
| Chile | | | 2 | X | 2 |
| Colombia | 2 | X | 2 | X | 4 |
| Costa Rica | 2 | X | 2 | X | 4 |
| Dominican Republic | 2 | X | 2 | X | 4 |
| Ecuador | 2 | X | | | 2 |
| El Salvador | 2 | X | 2 | X | 4 |
| Guatemala | 2 | X | 2 | X | 4 |
| Mexico | 2 | X | 2 | X | 4 |
| Panama | 2 | X | | | 2 |
| Peru | 2 | X | 2 | X | 4 |
| Puerto Rico | 2 | X | 2 | X | 4 |
| United States | 2 | X | 2 | X | 4 |
| Venezuela | 2 | X | 2 | X | 4 |
| Total athletes | 32 | 32 | 32 | 32 | 64 |
| Total NOCs | 16 | 16 | 16 | 16 | 19 NOC's |
