= Bowling at the 2018 South American Games =

- Venue: Rock 'n' Bowling
- Location: La Paz, Bolivia
- Dates: 26–30 May
- Competitors: 36 from 12 nations

There were four bowling events at the 2018 South American Games in Cochabamba, Bolivia. The events were held between May 26 and 30 at the Rock'n Bowl in the capital of La Paz. The top 4 teams in each gender (determined by total pins knocked down in the singles and doubles combined) qualified to compete at the 2019 Pan American Games in Lima, Peru. Each country had too choose two events to qualify through. Uruguay was the only nation to select this event to qualify through.

== Medal summary ==
=== Medal table ===
Rank	Nation	Gold	Silver	Bronze	Total
1	Venezuela (VEN)	3	1	0	4
2	Colombia (COL)	1	1	2	4
3	Aruba (ARU)	0	1	1	2
4	Panama (PAN)	0	1	0	1
5	Argentina (ARG)	0	0	2	2
6	Brazil (BRA)	0	0	1	1
Totals (6 entries)		4	4	6	14

=== Medalists ===
Event	Gold	Silver	Bronze
Men's singles	Ildemaro Ruiz; Venezuela	Donald Lee; Panama	Lucas Legnani; Argentina
Men's singles	Ildemaro Ruiz; Venezuela	Donald Lee; Panama	Renan Ferreira; Brazil
Men's doubles	Andrés Gómez; Manuel Otalora; Colombia	Ildemaro Ruiz; Rogelio Felice; Venezuela	Ricardo Rosa; Lucas Legnani; Argentina
Women's singles	Patricia Zamudio; Venezuela	María Rodríguez; Colombia	Anggie Ramírez; Colombia
Women's singles	Patricia Zamudio; Venezuela	María Rodríguez; Colombia	Thashaina Seraus; Aruba
Women's doubles	Patricia Zamudio; Karen Marcano; Venezuela	Thashaina Seraus; Kamilah Dammers; Aruba	Anggie Ramírez; María Rodríguez; Colombia
