= Bowling at the 2023 Central American and Caribbean Games =

- Venue: Villa Cari
- Location: (El Salvador) San Salvador
- Dates: 28 June – 4 July
- Competitors: 160 from 11 nations

The bowling competition at the 2023 Central American and Caribbean Games will be held in San Salvador, El Salvador from 28 June to 4 July at the Villa Cari.

== Participating nations ==
A total of 11 countries qualified athletes. The number of athletes a nation entered is in parentheses beside the name of the country.

- Aruba (6)
- Bermuda (6)
- Colombia (12)
- Costa Rica (12)
- Dominican Republic (12)
- El Salvador (12)
- Centro Caribe Sports (12)
- Mexico (12)
- Panama (12)
- Puerto Rico (12)
- Venezuela (12)

== Medal table ==
* Host nation (El Salvador)

Rank	Nation	Gold	Silver	Bronze	Total
1	Mexico (MEX)	6	2	1	9
2	Colombia (COL)	3	3	4	10
3	Aruba (ARU)	1	0	0	1
4	Puerto Rico (PUR)	0	2	2	4
5	Centro Caribe Sports (CCS)	0	2	1	3
6	Costa Rica (CRC)	0	1	0	1
7	Venezuela (VEN)	0	0	2	2
Totals (7 entries)		10	10	10	30

== Medal summary ==
=== Men's events ===
Event	Gold	Silver	Bronze
Individual	Gonzalo Hurtado; Mexico	Marco Moretti; Costa Rica	Luis Rovaina; Venezuela
Doubles	Mexico (MEX); Mario Quintero; Ricardo Lecuona	Centro Caribe Sports (CCS); Juan Pineda; Diego Aguilar	Colombia (COL); Edwar Rey; Óscar Rodríguez
Trios	Colombia (COL); Edwar Rey; Óscar Rodríguez; Manuel Otalora	Puerto Rico (PUR); Jorge Rodriguez; David Marquez; Christian Azcona	Venezuela (VEN); Rogelio Felice; Luis Andueza; Javier Pardi
Quintets	Mexico (MEX); Mario Quintero; Ricardo Lecuona; Humberto Vazquez; Enrique Gutierrez; Jesus Lecona; Gonzalo Hurtado	Puerto Rico (PUR); Christian Azcona; Edgar Burgos; David Marquez; Israel Hernandez; Jean Perez; Jorge Rodriguez	Colombia (COL); Manuel Otalora; Alfredo Quintana; Felipe Gil; Sebastián Salazar; Óscar Rodríguez; Edwar Rey
All individual events	Gonzalo Hurtado; Mexico	Óscar Rodríguez; Colombia	Christian Azona; Puerto Rico

=== Women's events ===
Event	Gold	Silver	Bronze
Individual	Kamilah Dammers; Aruba	Sofia Rodriguez; Centro Caribe Sports	Taishaye Naranjo; Puerto Rico
Doubles	Colombia (COL); María Rodríguez; Clara Guerrero	Mexico (MEX); Miriam Zetter; Iliana Lomeli	Mexico (MEX); Graciela Sanchez; Sandra Gongora
Trios	Colombia (COL); María Rodríguez; Juliana Franco; Clara Guerrero	Mexico (MEX); Miriam Zetter; Iliana Lomeli; Sandra Gongora	Colombia (COL); María Ferraro; Verónica Cepeda; Juliana Botero
Quintets	Mexico (MEX); Paola Limon; Lilia Robles; Sandra Gongora; Iliana Lomeli; Miriam Zetter	Colombia (COL); Clara Guerrero; María Rodríguez; Juliana Franco; Juliana Botero; María Ferraro; Verónica Cepeda	Centro Caribe Sports (CCS); Sofia Rodriguez; Ana Morales; Laura Barrios; Claudia Barrios; Ana Bolanos; Stefany Salazar
All individual events	Miriam Zetter; Mexico	Clara Guerrero; Colombia	Juliana Franco; Colombia
