= Bowling at the 2006 Central American and Caribbean Games =

- Location: Cartagena, Colombia
- Dates: 20–27 July

The Bowling competition at the 2006 Central American and Caribbean Games was held in Cartagena, Colombia. The tournament was scheduled to be held from 15–30 July 2006.

== Medal summary ==
=== Men's events ===
| Event | Gold | Silver | Bronze |
|---|---|---|---|
| Masters | Mexico; Daniel Falconi | Venezuela; Ildemaro Ruiz | Puerto Rico; Gabriel Sanchez |
| Pairs | Puerto Rico; Francisco Colon; Bruno Diaz | Venezuela; Ildemaro Ruiz; Eddy Fuentes | Mexico; Alejandro Cruz; Daniel Falconi |
| Triples | Puerto Rico; Luis Rodriguez; Francisco Colon; Gabriel Sanchez | Mexico; Marcos Baeza; Benjamin Corona; Ernesto Franco | Colombia; Jaime Monroy; Jorge Otalora; David Romero |
| Team of 5 | Mexico; Marcos Baeza; Benjamin Corona; Alejandro Cruz; Marco Martinez; Daniel Falconi | Colombia; Jaime Monroy; Jorge Otalora; Manuel Otalora; David Romero; David Rivera | Puerto Rico; Gabriel Sanchez; Francisco Colon; Luis Rodriguez; Bruno Diaz; Edgardo Ruiz |

=== Women's events ===
| Event | Gold | Silver | Bronze |
|---|---|---|---|
| Masters | Venezuela; Karen Lugo | Venezuela; Alicia Marcano | Dominican Republic; Paola Mendez |
| Pairs | Mexico; Sandra Góngora; Adriana Perez | Venezuela; Karen Lugo; Mariela Alarza | Colombia; Clara Guerrero; Sara Vargas |
| Triples | Venezuela; Karen Lugo; Alicia Marcano; Karen Marcano | Dominican Republic; Aura Guerra; Ana Henriquez; Paola Mendez | Panama; Yvette Chen; Edissa de Vallarino; Karen Holder |
| Team of 5 | Puerto Rico; Mariana Ayala; Yoselin Leon; Sasha Luciano; Miriam Perez; Jessica Santiago | Colombia; Paola Gómez; Clara Guerrero; Luz Leal; Diana Leal; Sara Vargas | Venezuela; Mariela Alarza; Karen Lugo; Karen Marcano; Alicia Marcano; Ingellimar Contreras |

=== Mixed events ===
| Event | Gold | Silver | Bronze |
|---|---|---|---|
| Pairs | Venezuela; Karen Lugo; Daniel Fuentes | Puerto Rico; Sasha Luciano; Luis Rodriguez | Mexico; Sandra Góngora; Alejandro Cruz |

== Medal table ==
* Host nation (Colombia)

| Rank | Nation | Gold | Silver | Bronze | Total |
|---|---|---|---|---|---|
| 1 | Venezuela | 3 | 4 | 1 | 8 |
| 2 | Mexico | 3 | 1 | 2 | 6 |
| 2 | Puerto Rico | 3 | 1 | 2 | 6 |
| 4 | Colombia* | 0 | 2 | 2 | 4 |
| 5 | Dominican Republic | 0 | 1 | 1 | 2 |
| 6 | Panama | 0 | 0 | 1 | 1 |
| Totals (6 entries) | | 9 | 9 | 9 | 27 |
