= PWBA Bowling Tour: 2025 season =

- League: Professional Women's Bowlers Association
- Sport: Ten-pin bowling
- Duration: May 8 – August 12, 2025

PWBA Tour seasons
- ← 2024 2026 →

While some locations have changed, the 2025 Professional Women's Bowling Association (PWBA) Tour season matches the 2024 season with 12 title events scheduled in eight cities. These include eight standard singles title events, three major title events, and one mixed doubles event. Final rounds of the season's three majors (USBC Queens, U.S. Women's Open and PWBA Tour Championship) will be broadcast on national television (CBS Sports Network), as will the PWBA Anniversary Open. All other events are broadcast on BowlTV, the USBC’s YouTube channel.

Two of the Tour stops feature three events each. The PWBA Summer Series – Cleveland had three events between May 28 and June 2. The PWBA Tour Championship Week in August begins with two standard, open events. The third event, the PWBA Tour Championship major, has a 24-player starting field composed of all the season’s title winners, plus the top season points-earners among non-winners.

The finals of the PWBA Anniversary Open were conducted in the Resch Center in Green Bay, Wisconsin in front of 6,559 fans — a record for a PWBA event. (The 2011 U.S. Women's Open was held in Cowboys Stadium in front of 8,017 fans, but that was during the PWBA's hiatus.)

PWBA Bowling Tour: 2026 season

== Tournament summary ==
Below is a list of events held in 2025 PWBA Tour season. Major tournaments are in bold. Career PWBA titles for winners are in parentheses. All winnings are shown in US dollars ($).

Event	Airdate	City	Preliminary rounds	Final round	Winner	Notes
PWBA GoBowling! Topeka Open	May 10 BowlTV	Topeka, KS	May 9–10 (May 8 – PTQ)	Live	Shayna Ng, Singapore (3)	Open event. Top prize $20,000.
**USBC Queens**	May 20 CBS Sports	Las Vegas, NV	May 15–19	Live	Josie Barnes, USA (5)	Open event. PWBA major. Top prize $60,000.
PWBA Summer Series – PWBA Cleveland Open	May 29 BowlTV	Parma Heights, OH	May 28–29	Live	Stephanie Zavala, USA (6)	Open event. Top prize $10,000.
PWBA Summer Series – PWBA BowlTV Open	May 31 BowlTV	Parma Heights, OH	May 30–31	Live	New Hui Fen, Singapore (3)	Open event. Top prize $10,000.
PWBA Summer Series – PWBA Rock 'n' Roll Open	Jun 2 BowlTV	Parma Heights, OH	Jun 1–2	Live	New Hui Fen, Singapore (4)	Open event. Top prize $10,000.
PWBA Bowlers Journal Waterloo Open	Jun 7 BowlTV	Waterloo, IA	Jun 6–7	Live	Jordan Snodgrass, USA (6)	Open event. Top prize $20,000.
**U.S. Women's Open**	Jun 17 CBS Sports	Lincoln, NE	Jun 12–16	Live	New Hui Fen, Singapore (5)	Open event. PWBA major. Top prize $60,000.
PWBA Anniversary Open	Jul 13 CBS Sports	Green Bay, WI	Jul 9–11	Live	Josie Barnes, USA (6)	Open event. Top prize $20,000.
PBA-PWBA Striking Against Breast Cancer Mixed Doubles	Jul 27 BowlTV	Houston, TX	Jul 24–26	Live	Bryanna Coté, USA (6) & Chris Via, USA	Open PBA and PWBA title event. Top prize $25,000 (team).
PWBA Rochester Open	Aug 7 BowlTV	Gates, NY	Aug 6–7	Live	Stefanie Johnson, USA (5)	Open event. Top prize $10,000.
PWBA Pepsi Open	Aug 9 BowlTV	Gates, NY	Aug 8–9	Live	Shannon Pluhowsky, USA (5)	Open event. Top prize $10,000.
**PWBA Tour Championship**	Aug 12 CBS Sports	Gates, NY	Aug 10–11	Live	Shannon Pluhowsky, USA (6)	Invitational event. 24-player starting field includes all 2025 titlists (PWBA members only) plus highest points earners among non-winners. PWBA major. Top prize $50,000.

== Season awards ==
=== 2025 player awards ===
- PWBA Player of the Year: New Hui Fen
- PWBA Rookie of the Year: Gillian Lim

=== 2025 points leaders ===
1. New Hui Fen (94,550)
2. Jordan Snodgrass (93,125)
3. Stephanie Zavala (75,370)

=== 2025 average leaders (minimum 6 events) ===
1. Jordan Snodgrass (218.86)
2. New Hui Fen (218.36)
3. Shannon Pluhowsky (215.22)

=== 2025 cashes ===
T1. Jordan Snodgrass (11)
T1. Bryanna Coté (11)
3. Stephanie Zavala (10)

=== 2025 earnings ===
1. New Hui Fen ($97,430)
2. Josie Barnes ($88,175)
3. Jordan Snodgrass ($82,653)
