= Bowling at the 2015 Pan American Games =

- Bowling pictogram for the games
- Venue: Pan Am Bowling Centre
- Dates: July 22–25
- No. of events: 4 (2 men, 2 women)
- Competitors: 56 from 15 nations

Bowling competitions at the 2015 Pan American Games in Toronto were held from July 22 to 25 at the Planet Bowl (Pan Am Bowling Centre), due to naming rights the venue was known as the latter for the duration of the games. A total of four events were contested (two each for men and women).

During the men's doubles event Canadian bowler François Lavoie scored a perfect game in the fifth round, the first in Pan American Games history.

== Competition schedule ==
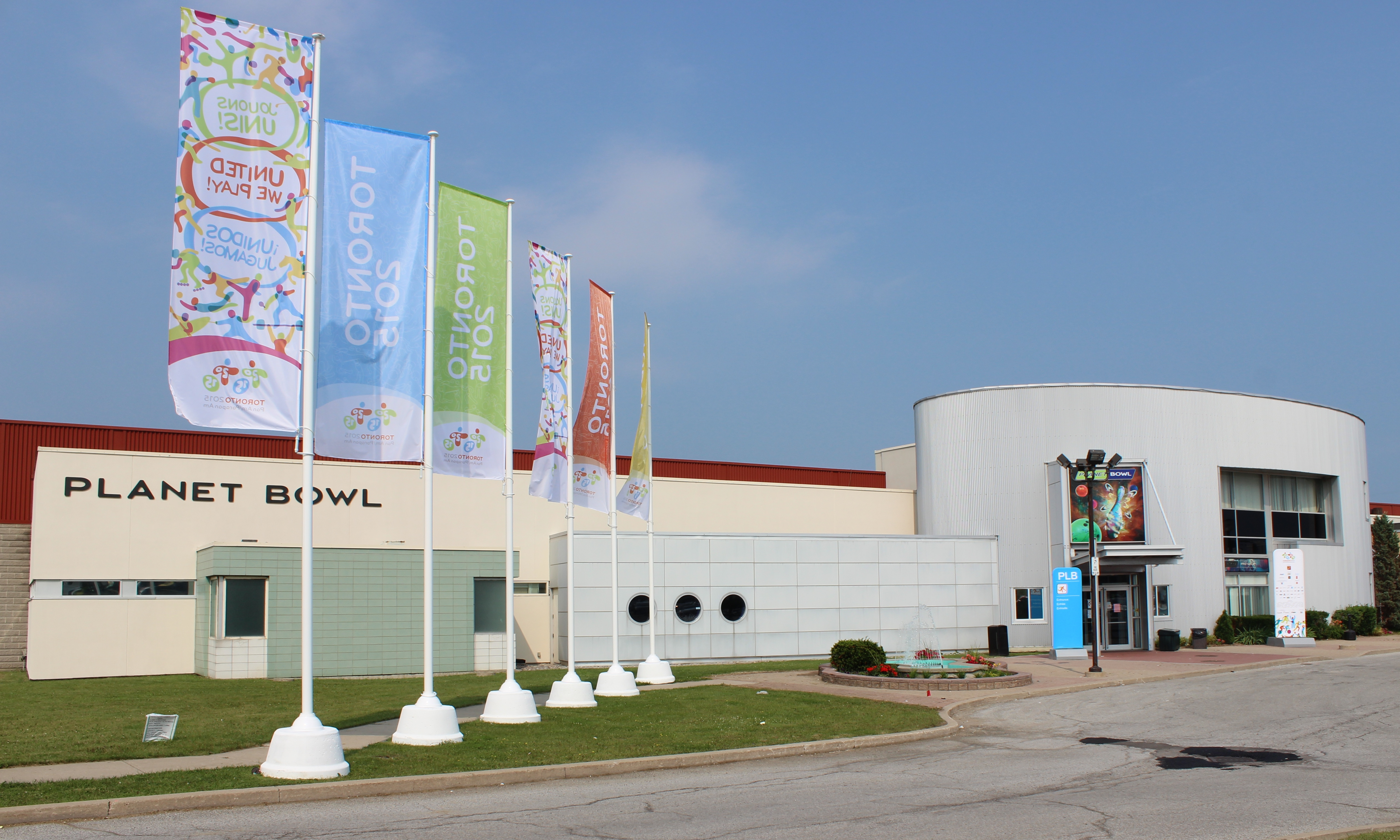
Bowling competition took place at Planet Bowl (Pan Am Bowling Centre)

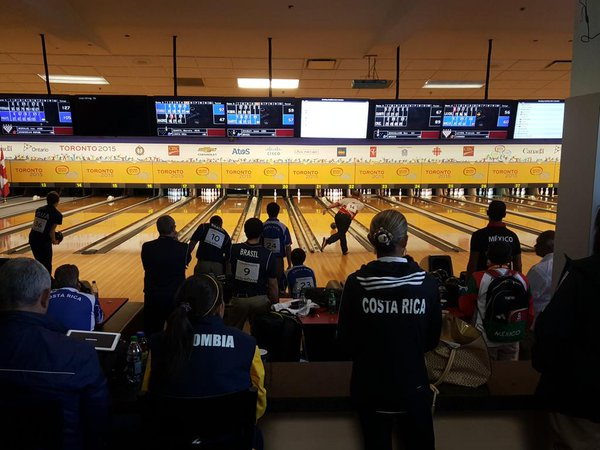
Bowling competition took place at Planet Bowl (Pan Am Bowling Centre)

The following is the competition schedule for the bowling competitions:

Q	Qualifications	¼	Quarterfinals	½	Semifinals	F	Final

Event↓/Date →	Wed 22	Thu 23	Fri 24	Sat 25		
Men's singles			Q	¼	½	F
Women's singles			Q	¼	½	F
Men's doubles	Q	F				
Women's doubles	Q	F				

== Medal table ==
* Host nation (Canada)

Rank	Nation	Gold	Silver	Bronze	Total
1	United States	1	1	3	5
2	Colombia	1	1	1	3
3	Canada*	1	0	1	2
4	Brazil	1	0	0	1
5	Venezuela	0	1	1	2
6	Dominican Republic	0	1	0	1
Totals (6 entries)		4	4	6	14

== Medalists ==
Event	Gold	Silver	Bronze
Men's singles	Marcelo Suartz; Brazil	Amleto Monacelli; Venezuela	Dan MacLelland; Canada
Men's singles	Marcelo Suartz; Brazil	Amleto Monacelli; Venezuela	Devin Bidwell; United States
Men's doubles	Canada; François Lavoie; Dan MacLelland	Colombia; Jaime González; Manuel Otalora	United States; Devin Bidwell; Tommy Jones
Women's singles	Shannon Pluhowsky; United States	Aumi Guerra; Dominican Republic	Liz Johnson; United States
Women's singles	Shannon Pluhowsky; United States	Aumi Guerra; Dominican Republic	Rocio Restrepo; Colombia
Women's doubles	Colombia; Clara Guerrero; Rocio Restrepo	United States; Liz Johnson; Shannon Pluhowsky	Venezuela; Patricia de Faria; Karen Marcano

== Participation ==
A total of 15 countries have qualified athletes. The number of athletes a nation has entered is in parentheses beside the name of the country.

- Argentina (4)
- Aruba (4)
- Brazil (4)
- Canada (4)
- Chile (2)
- Colombia (4)
- Costa Rica (4)
- Dominican Republic (4)
- El Salvador (4)
- Guatemala (4)
- Mexico (4)
- Panama (2)
- Puerto Rico (4)
- United States (4)
- Venezuela (4)

== Qualification ==
A total of 56 bowlers will qualify to compete at the Games. Each country is allowed to enter a maximum of two male and two female athletes. Each gender has a quota of 14 nations (28 bowlers) for a total of 56 athletes.
