= Bowling at the 2017 World Games =

- Venue: Sky Tower
- Dates: 21–24 July 2017
- Competitors: 64 from 19 nations

The Bowling competition at the 2017 World Games took place from July 21 to July 24, in Wrocław in Poland, at the Sky Tower.

== Participating nations ==
- Canada (4)
- China (2)
- Chinese Taipei (4)
- Colombia (4)
- Denmark (4)
- Finland (4)
- Germany (4)
- (United Kingdom) Great Britain (2)
- Hong Kong (2)
- India (2)
- Japan (4)
- Mexico (4)
- Netherlands (2)
- Ukraine (2)
- Poland (4)
- Singapore (4)
- South Korea (4)
- United States (4)
- Venezuela (4)

== Medals table ==
Rank	Nation	Gold	Silver	Bronze	Total
1	Colombia	1	1	0	2
1	United States	1	1	0	2
3	Canada	1	0	0	1
3	South Korea	1	0	0	1
5	Venezuela	0	2	0	2
6	Germany	0	0	1	1
6	Hong Kong	0	0	1	1
6	Mexico	0	0	1	1
6	Ukraine	0	0	1	1
Totals (9 entries)		4	4	4	12

== Medalists ==
Event	Gold	Silver	Bronze
Men's singles	Cho Young-seon; South Korea	Ildemaro Ruiz; Venezuela	Tobias Bording; Germany
Men's doubles	Canada; Dan MacLelland; François Lavoie	Venezuela; Massimiliano Fridegotto; Ildemaro Ruiz	Hong Kong; Wu Siu Hong; Michael Mak
Women's singles	Kelly Kulick; United States	Clara Guerrero; Colombia	Daria Kovalova; Ukraine
Women's doubles	Colombia; Rocio Restrepo; Clara Guerrero	United States; Kelly Kulick; Danielle McEwan	Mexico; Sandra Góngora; Tannya Lopez

Laura Buethner of Germany originally won gold in women's singles. but Buethner tested positive for a banned substance. As a result of the positive doping test, Buethner was stripped of the gold medal. Kelly Kulick, who originally won silver, was awarded the gold medal. Clara Guerrero, who originally won bronze, was awarded the silver medal and Daria Kovalova, originally fourth in the final standings, was awarded the bronze medal.
