= Marcelo Suartz =

Brazilian bowler (born 1987)

Personal information
- Full name: Marcelo Antonio Suartz
- Born: 24 September 1987 (age 38)
- Height: 1.74 m (5 ft 9 in)

Sport
- Country: Brazil
- Sport: Bowling
Medal record
Men's bowling
Representing Brazil
Pan American Games
Gold medal – first place	2015 Toronto	Singles
Silver medal – second place	2019 Lima	Singles
Bronze medal – third place	2011 Guadalajara	Singles
South American Games
Gold medal – first place	2014 Santiago	Singles
Gold medal – first place	2022 Asunción	Doubles
Silver medal – second place	2014 Santiago	Doubles

Marcelo Antonio Suartz (born 24 September 1987) is a Brazilian bowler.

At the 2014 South American Games held in Toronto, Canada, he won a gold medal in bowling in singles, and a silver medal in doubles playing with Renan Zoghaib.

At the 2015 Pan American Games held in Toronto, Canada, he won a gold medal in bowling in singles. He also won silver at the 2019 Pan American Games and bronze in 2011.

At the 2022 South American Games held in Asunción, Paraguay, he won a gold medal in bowling in doubles.
