= Bowling at the 2014 South American Games =

There were four bowling events at the 2014 South American Games. The top 4 of each doubles tournament qualifies to compete at the 2015 Pan American Games in Toronto, Ontario, Canada.

== Medalists ==
Event	Gold	Silver	Bronze
Men's events
Men's singles	Marcelo Suartz; Brazil	Ildemaro Ruiz; Venezuela	Jaime González; Colombia; Juan Carlos Narvaez; Panama
Men's doubles	Venezuela	Brazil	Colombia
Women's events
Women's singles	Karen Marcano; Venezuela	Clara Guerrero; Colombia	Anggie Ramírez; Colombia; Patricia De Faria; Venezuela
Women's doubles	Colombia	Venezuela	Argentina

- 4th place in the men's doubles was Argentina and 4th place in the women's doubles was Chile.
