= Edgardo Ruiz =

Puerto Rican ten-pin bowler

Medal record
Men's Bowling
Representing Puerto Rico
World Senior Championships
Bronze medal – third place	2013 Las Vegas	Team of 4
Central American and Caribbean Games
Bronze medal – third place	2006 Cartagena	Team of 5

Edgardo Ruiz is a Puerto Rican ten-pin bowler. He finished in 23rd position of the combined rankings at the 2006 AMF World Cup and was part of the trio (with Bruno Diaz and Julio Wiscovitch) obtaining the 9th place in the 20th Central American and Caribbean Sports Games.
