= PWBA Bowling Tour: 2016 season =

- League: Professional Women's Bowlers Association
- Sport: Ten-pin bowling
- Duration: April 29 – September 4
- Season MVP: Liz Johnson

PWBA Tour seasons
- ← 2015 2017 →

The Professional Women's Bowling Association (PWBA) Tour expanded from 11 events, including 3 majors, in 2015 to 14 events, including 4 majors, in 2016. The fourth major was the PWBA Players Championship, which was sponsored by GoBowling.com. The season ran from April 29 to September 4. CBS Sports Network aired the final round of all PWBA Tour events this season on a tape-delay basis, except for majors which aired the final round live. TV tapings of the non-major stepladder finals were conducted in conjunction with first three major tournaments on May 26 (USBC Queens), June 26 (PWBA Players Championship) and August 7 (U.S. Women's Open).

The PBA Striking Against Breast Cancer Mixed Doubles, a cross-over event with the PBA Tour, returned for 2016. PBA and PWBA titles were awarded to the male and female winners, respectively.

== Tournament summary ==
Below is a recap of events held during the 2016 PWBA Tour season. Major tournaments are in bold. Career PWBA title numbers for winners are shown in parentheses (#).

Event	Airdate	City	Preliminary rounds	Final round	Winner	Top Prize
PWBA Las Vegas Open	Jun 7 C	Las Vegas, NV	Apr 29–May 1	May 26	Liz Johnson, USA (18)	$10,000
Nationwide PWBA Sonoma County Open	Jun 14 C	Rohnert Park, CA	May 5–7	May 26	Shannon O'Keefe, USA (2)	$10,000
PWBA Storm Sacramento Open	Jun 21 C	Citrus Heights, CA	May 12–14	May 26	Cherie Tan, Singapore (1)	$10,000
**USBC Queens**	May 26 C	Las Vegas, NV	May 20–25	Live	Bernice Lim, Singapore (1)	$20,000
PWBA Wichita Open	Jul 5 C	Wichita, KS	Jun 2–4	Jun 26	Danielle McEwan, USA (2)	$10,000
Pepsi PWBA Lincoln Open	Jul 12 C	Lincoln, NE	Jun 9–11	Jun 26	Shannon O'Keefe, USA (3)	$10,000
PWBA Greater Detroit Open	Jul 19 C	Canton, MI	Jun 16–18	Jun 26	Rocio Restrepo, Colombia (1)	$10,000
**GoBowling.com PWBA Players Championship**	Jun 26 C	Green Bay, WI	Jun 23–25	Live	Clara Guerrero, Colombia (1)	$20,000
PWBA Lexington Open	Aug 16 C	Lexington, KY	Jun 30–Jul 2	Aug 7	Bryanna Coté, USA (1)	$10,000
PWBA Rochester Open	Aug 23 C	Rochester, NY	Jul 7–9	Aug 7	Josie Earnest, USA (1)	$10,000
PWBA St. Petersburg-Clearwater Open	Aug 30 C	Seminole, FL	Jul 14–16	Aug 7	Rocio Restropo, Colombia (2)	$10,000
PBA/PWBA Striking Against Breast Cancer Mixed Doubles	Jul 31 X	Houston, TX	Jul 29–30	Live	Shannon O'Keefe, USA (4) and Bill O'Neill (USA)	$16,000
**U.S. Women’s Open**	Aug 7 C	Addison, IL	Aug 1–6	Live	Liz Johnson, USA (19)	$20,000
**The Smithfield PWBA Tour Championship**	Sep 4 C	Midlothian, VA	Sep 1–3	Live	New Hui Fen, Singapore (1)	$20,000

- C: broadcast on CBS Sports Network
- X: broadcast on the PBA's Xtra Frame webcast service
