= Josie Barnes =

American ten-pin bowler

Personal information
- Born: Josie Earnest; June 28, 1988 (age 38) Vandalia, Illinois, U.S.
- Years active: 2015–present

Bowling Information
- Sport: Tenpin bowling
- Affiliation: PWBA
- Dominant hand: Right
- Wins: 6 PWBA (2 majors); 6 gold medals in international competition
- Sponsors: Storm Products, VISE grips, CoolWick

Josie Barnes (née Earnest, born June 28, 1988) is a professional tenpin bowler and bowling coach originally from Vandalia, Illinois. She is one of the top players currently competing in the Professional Women's Bowling Association (PWBA). She has six PWBA Tour titles to date, including two major championships at the 2021 U.S. Women’s Open, in which she won a PWBA-record $100,000 first prize, and the 2025 USBC Queens where she won a $60,000 first prize.

Barnes is a nine-time member of Team USA, and has also spent eight seasons as the associate head coach for the women's bowling team at her alma mater, Vanderbilt University. In March of 2026, Vanderbilt announced that Barnes will be promoted to head coach at the conclusion of the current college bowling season.

Barnes is a pro staff member for Storm Bowling, and is also sponsored by VISE grips and CoolWick sportswear.

== Amateur career ==
At Vanderbilt University, Barnes (then Josie Earnest) was a member of the team that won the 2007 NCAA Women’s Bowling Championships, and was voted Most Outstanding Player of this event. She was named a second team All-American in 2007, and a first team All-American in each of the next three seasons (2008–2010). Josie was voted NTCA Division I Player of the Year in the 2008 and 2009 seasons. In 2008, she was voted by the Tennessee Sports Hall of Fame as co-winner of the Female Amateur Athlete of Year award (with University of Tennessee basketball player Candace Parker). She was a 2013 inductee into the Vanderbilt Athletic Hall of Fame. Barnes has been a part of all three Vanderbilt women's bowling national championships: one as a player (2007) and two as associate head coach (2018, 2023).

Barnes was a five-time member of Junior Team USA (2005 and 2007–2010), and is a nine-time member of Team USA (2012, 2013 and 2015–2021).

As a junior player, Barnes won four gold medals (singles, trios, team and all-events) at the 2008 Pan American Bowling Confederation (PABCON) Youth Championships. As an adult, she won one gold medal (team) and one bronze medal (Masters) at the 2012 PABCON Championships. At the 2016 PABCON Championships, she won a gold medal in trios and a silver medal in team competition. She then won a bronze medal in doubles at the 2017 World Bowling Women’s Championships.

== Professional career ==
Barnes joined the PWBA in 2015, the organization’s first season since returning from an 11-year hiatus (2004–2014). Prior to this, she made her first professional telecast at the 2012 U.S. Women's Open, finishing fifth. After a mostly unsuccessful 2015 campaign, she broke through with her first professional title at the PWBA Rochester Open, the tenth event of the 2016 season.

She went on to win two more standard titles in 2018 and 2019, then won her first major championship in the 2021 U.S. Women's Open. At this event, Barnes earned the #1 seed in qualifying, and won her lone finals match against Singapore’s Cherie Tan by a score of 198–194. The winner’s share for the tournament was a PWBA-record $100,000.

Barnes won her second major championship at the 2025 USBC Queens in Las Vegas. As the top seed, she defeated Sin Li Jane from Malaysia, 211–198, in the final match. Barnes earned the USBC Queens tiara and first place prize of $60,000. On July 14, Barnes won her sixth PWBA title at the PWBA Anniversary Open in Green Bay, Wisconsin. The televised finals were conducted at the Resch Center arena, with a PWBA-record 6,559 fans in attendance. As the #2 seed, Barnes defeated Verity Crawley in the semifinal match before topping #1 seed Kayla Smith in the championship match by a 236–191 score. This marks Barnes' first season with multiple titles.

=== PWBA Tour titles ===
Major championships are in bold text.

1. 2016 PWBA Rochester Open (Rochester, NY)
2. 2018 PWBA East Hartford Open (East Hartford, CT)
3. 2019 Nationwide PWBA Greater Cleveland Open (Cleveland, OH)
4. **2021 U.S. Women’s Open** (Rohnert Park, CA)
5. **2025 USBC Queens** (Las Vegas, NV)
6. 2025 PWBA Anniversary Open (Green Bay, WI)

== Personal ==
Originally from Vandalia, Illinois, Barnes says she grew up in her parents’ 12-lane bowling center. She played softball and tennis in high school, “but always knew that bowling was what I wanted to do.”

Following high school, Barnes moved to Nashville, Tennessee to attend Vanderbilt University. She earned her degree in Human and Organizational Development and decided to stay in the area following graduation. She married Kyle Barnes in 2017, and the couple has one daughter (Lisa Ruth). She now resides in Hermitage, Tennessee.
