= Bowling at the 2019 Pan American Games =

- Bowling pictogram
- Venue: Bowling Centre
- Dates: July 25–30, 2019
- Competitors: 64 from 17 nations

Bowling competitions at the 2019 Pan American Games in Lima, Peru are scheduled to be held between July 25 and 30, 2019 at the Bowling Centre located at the Villa Deportiva Nacional Videna.

Four medal events are scheduled to be contested, a singles and doubles events for each men and women. A total of 64 bowlers will qualify to compete at the games.

== Medal table ==
Rank	Nation	Gold	Silver	Bronze	Total
1	United States	3	0	1	4
2	Colombia	1	1	1	3
3	Mexico	0	2	2	4
4	Brazil	0	1	0	1
5	Dominican Republic	0	0	1	1
5	Puerto Rico	0	0	1	1
Totals (6 entries)		4	4	6	14

== Medalists ==
Event	Gold	Silver	Bronze
Men's singles	Nicholas Pate; United States	Marcelo Suartz; Brazil	Jakob Butturff; United States
Men's singles	Nicholas Pate; United States	Marcelo Suartz; Brazil	Jean Pérez; Puerto Rico
Men's doubles^{[a]}	United States; Jakob Butturff; Nicholas Pate	Colombia; Manuel Otalora; Alfredo Quintana	Mexico; José Llergo; Arturo Quintero
Women's singles	Clara Guerrero; Colombia	Miriam Zetter; Mexico	Iliana Lomelí; Mexico
Women's singles	Clara Guerrero; Colombia	Miriam Zetter; Mexico	María Rodríguez; Colombia
Women's doubles	United States; Stefanie Johnson; Shannon O'Keefe	Mexico; Miriam Zetter; Iliana Lomelí	Dominican Republic; Astrid Valiente; Aumi Guerra

- ^{Men's doubles} Jean Pérez was stripped of his gold medal due to a doping violation. Puerto Rico team was disqualified.

== Participating nations ==
A total of 17 countries qualified bowlers. The number of athletes a nation entered is in parentheses beside the name of the country.

- Argentina (4)
- Aruba (4)
- Bermuda (4)
- Brazil (4)
- Canada (4)
- Colombia (4)
- Costa Rica (4)
- Dominican Republic (4)
- Ecuador (2)
- El Salvador (4)
- Guatemala (4)
- Mexico (4)
- Panama (2)
- Peru (4)
- Puerto Rico (4)
- United States (4)
- Venezuela (4)

== Qualification ==
A total of 64 bowlers will qualify to compete. Each nation may enter a maximum of 4 athletes (four per gender). In each gender there will be a total of 16 pairs qualified, with one spot per event (so a total of four bowlers) reserved for the host nation Peru. There will be a total of five qualification events.
