= Zara Glover =

British ten-pin bowler

Personal information
- Born: 24 January 1982 (age 44) Preston, Lancashire)
Medal record
Women's Ten-pin Bowling
Representing England
Event	1st	2nd	3rd
World Bowling Championships	3	–	–
World Games	–	1	–
World Tenpin Team Cup	2	–	–
European Tenpin Team Cup	1	–	1
European Tenpin Bowling Championships	1	1	–
World Youth Bowling Championships	2	–	–
Total	9	2	1
World Tenpin Bowling Championships
Gold medal – first place	Kuala Lumpur 2003	Singles
Gold medal – first place	Kuala Lumpur 2003	Doubles
Gold medal – first place	Kuala Lumpur 2003	All Events
World Games
Silver medal – second place	Müllheim 2005	Singles
World Tenpin Team Cup
Gold medal – first place	Hoofddorp 2004	Team
Gold medal – first place	Hoofddorp 2003	Team
European Tenpin Team Cup
Gold medal – first place	Norwich 2004	Team
Bronze medal – third place	Müllheim 2002	Team
European Tenpin Bowling Championships
Gold medal – first place	Aalborg 2001	Trios
Silver medal – second place	Aalborg 2001	Masters
World Youth Bowling Championships
Gold medal – first place	Pattaya 2002	Team
Gold medal – first place	Santo Domingo 2000	Doubles

Zara Glover (born 24 January 1982 in Preston, Lancashire), is a ten-pin bowler. She is a world champion bowler and a bowling tutor for Brunswick Bowling Academies across Europe.

== Achievements ==
- 2007 World Ranking Masters runner-up – Florida, U.S.
- 2006 San Marino Open Champion – second title defended successfully in 2006
- 2006 Indonesian Open Champion – title defended successfully
- 2005 European Ladies Masters Champion – Barcelona
- 2005 San Marino Open Champion
- 2005 Indonesian Open Champion – Jakarta
- 2005 World Games Singles silver medallist – Müllheim, Germany
- 2004 World Tenpin Team Cup gold medallist – Hoofddorp, Netherlands
- 2004 European Tenpin Team Cup gold medallist – Norwich, England
- 2004 Oltremare Naples Champion – Italy
- 2003 World Tenpin Team Cup gold medallist – Odense, Denmark
- 2003 Singles, Doubles and All-events World Champion – Kuala Lumpur, Malaysia
- 2002 World Youth Championships Team gold medallist – Pattaya, Thailand
- 2002 European Tenpin Team Cup Bronze medallist – Müllheim, Germany
- 2001 Trios European Champion and Masters silver medallist – Aalborg, Denmark
- 2000 World Youth Championships Doubles gold medallist – Santo Domingo, Dominican Republic
