= Piritta Maja =

Finnish ten-pin bowler (born 1978)

Piritta Kantola (born 1978) is a Finnish ten-pin bowler. She won a bronze medal in the women's singles event at the 2001 World Games and finished in 13th position of the combined rankings at the 2006 AMF World Cup.
