= Bowling at the 2023 Pan American Games =

- Bowling pictogram
- Venue: Bowling Centre
- Start date: November 2, 2023
- End date: November 5, 2023
- No. of events: 4 (2 men, 2 women)
- Competitors: 50 from 15 nations

Bowling competitions at the 2023 Pan American Games in Santiago, Chile are scheduled to be held at the Bowling Centre located in La Florida between November 2 and 5, 2023.

Four medal events are scheduled to be contested, a singles and doubles events for each men and women.

== Qualification ==
A total of 50 bowlers will qualify to compete. Each nation may enter a maximum of 4 athletes (two per gender). The champions of the Cali 2021 Junior Pan American Games will only be able to compete in the individual events of the Santiago 2023 Pan American Games. If the athletes who qualified at the Cali 2021 Junior Pan American Games do not participate in the Santiago 2023 Pan American Games, said place will be forfeited and cannot be transferred to another NOC or athlete. Qualified athletes at the Cali 2021 Junior Pan American Games will not be able to obtain another slot for their NOC; however, another athlete may compete for another slot through the Santiago 2023 qualification system within the maximum quota per NOC. In each gender there will be a total of 12 pairs qualified, with one spot per event (so a total of four bowlers) reserved for the host nation Chile. There will be a total of four qualification events. Each nation could only enter two qualification events per gender.

== Participating nations ==
A total of 15 countries qualified bowlers. The number of athletes a nation entered is in parentheses beside the name of the country.

- Aruba (2)
- Brazil (4)
- Canada (2)
- Chile (4)
- Colombia (4)
- Costa Rica (4)
- Dominican Republic (4)
- Ecuador (2)
- El Salvador (2)
- Independent Athletes Team (4)
- Mexico (2)
- Panama (2)
- Puerto Rico (6)
- United States (4)
- Venezuela (4)

== Medal table ==
Rank	Nation	Gold	Silver	Bronze	Total
1	United States	2	0	1	3
2	Colombia	1	2	0	3
3	Panama	1	0	0	1
4	Canada	0	2	0	2
5	Costa Rica	0	0	2	2
5	Mexico	0	0	2	2
7	Puerto Rico	0	0	1	1
Totals (7 entries)		4	4	6	14

=== Medalists ===
Event	Gold	Silver	Bronze
Men's singles	A. J. Johnson; United States	Mitch Hupé; Canada	Marco Moretti; Costa Rica
Men's singles	A. J. Johnson; United States	Mitch Hupé; Canada	Cristian Azcona; Puerto Rico
Men's doubles	Panama; Donald Lee; William Duen	Canada; Mitch Hupé; François Lavoie	Costa Rica; Juan Rodríguez; Marco Moretti
Women's singles	Clara Guerrero; Colombia	Juliana Franco; Colombia	Sandra Góngora; Mexico
Women's singles	Clara Guerrero; Colombia	Juliana Franco; Colombia	Breanna Clemmer; United States
Women's doubles	United States; Jordan Richard; Breanna Clemmer	Colombia; Juliana Franco; Clara Guerrero	Mexico; Sandra Góngora; Iliana Lomeli
