= Sofia Granda =

Guatemalan ten-pin bowler

Sofia Granda is a Guatemalan ten-pin bowler. She finished in 17th position of the combined rankings at the 2006 AMF World Cup. She participated in the 2009 Macau, China International Open Ten-Pin Bowling Championship and is also ranked 2nd throughout Latin American ten-pin bowlers.
