= Clara Guerrero =

Colombian ten-pin bowler

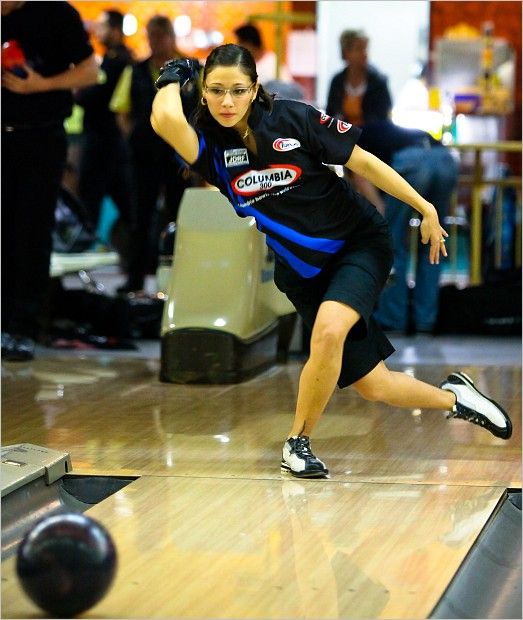
- Guerrero in 2009

Personal information
- Born: Clara Juliana Guerrero Londoño; April 22, 1982 (age 44) Armenia, Colombia
- Height: 1.64 m (5 ft 5 in)
- Weight: 57 kg (126 lb)

Sport
- Country: Colombia
- Sport: Bowling
Medal record
Representing Colombia
Women's bowling
Event	1st	2nd	3rd
World Championships	3	2	4
World Games	1	2	0
Pan American Games	3	2	2
CAC Games	8	4	8
South American Games	7	2	2
Bolivarian Games	9	4	1
Total	31	16	17
World Championships
Gold medal – first place	2009 Las Vegas	All events
Gold medal – first place	2009 Las Vegas	Masters
Gold medal – first place	2019 Las Vegas	Team
Silver medal – second place	1999 Abu Dhabi	Team
Silver medal – second place	2019 Las Vegas	Trios
Bronze medal – third place	2003 Malaysia	Team
Bronze medal – third place	2011 Hong Kong	Team
Bronze medal – third place	2017 Las Vegas	Team
Bronze medal – third place	2019 Las Vegas	Doubles
World Games
Gold medal – first place	2017 Wroclaw	Doubles
Silver medal – second place	2017 Wroclaw	Singles
Silver medal – second place	2022 Birmingham	Singles
Pan American Games
Gold medal – first place	2015 Toronto	Doubles
Gold medal – first place	2019 Lima	Singles
Gold medal – first place	2023 Santiago	Singles
Silver medal – second place	1999 Winnipeg	Team
Silver medal – second place	2023 Santiago	Doubles
Bronze medal – third place	2003 Santo Domingo	Singles
Bronze medal – third place	2003 Santo Domingo	Doubles
Central American and Caribbean Games
Gold medal – first place	2010 Mayagüez	Trios
Gold medal – first place	2014 Veracruz	Trios
Gold medal – first place	2018 Barranquilla	Doubles
Gold medal – first place	2023 San Salvador	Doubles
Gold medal – first place	2023 San Salvador	Trios
Gold medal – first place	2026 Santo Domingo	Doubles
Gold medal – first place	2026 Santo Domingo	Trios
Gold medal – first place	2026 Santo Domingo	Team
Silver medal – second place	2006 Cartagena	Team
Silver medal – second place	2018 Barranquilla	Team
Silver medal – second place	2023 San Salvador	All events
Silver medal – second place	2023 San Salvador	Team
Bronze medal – third place	2006 Cartagena	Doubles
Bronze medal – third place	2010 Mayagüez	Singles
Bronze medal – third place	2010 Mayagüez	All events
Bronze medal – third place	2010 Mayagüez	Masters
Bronze medal – third place	2010 Mayagüez	Doubles
Bronze medal – third place	2010 Mayagüez	Team
Bronze medal – third place	2014 Veracruz	Team
Bronze medal – third place	2026 Santo Domingo	Singles
South American Games
Gold medal – first place	2010 Medellín	Singles
Gold medal – first place	2010 Medellín	All events
Gold medal – first place	2010 Medellín	Masters
Gold medal – first place	2010 Medellín	Doubles
Gold medal – first place	2010 Medellín	Fours
Gold medal – first place	2010 Medellín	Team
Gold medal – first place	2014 Santiago	Doubles
Silver medal – second place	2010 Medellín	Trios
Silver medal – second place	2014 Santiago	Singles
Bronze medal – third place	2022 Asunción	Singles
Bronze medal – third place	2022 Asunción	Doubles
Bolivarian Games
Gold medal – first place	2013 Trujillo	Singles
Gold medal – first place	2013 Trujillo	All events
Gold medal – first place	2013 Trujillo	Masters
Gold medal – first place	2013 Trujillo	Doubles
Gold medal – first place	2013 Trujillo	Trios
Gold medal – first place	2013 Trujillo	Team
Gold medal – first place	2017 Santa Marta	Masters
Gold medal – first place	2017 Santa Marta	Team
Gold medal – first place	2022 Valledupar	Team
Silver medal – second place	2013 Trujillo	Fours
Silver medal – second place	2017 Santa Marta	Doubles
Silver medal – second place	2017 Santa Marta	Trios
Silver medal – second place	2022 Valledupar	Doubles
Bronze medal – third place	2022 Valledupar	Singles

Clara Juliana Guerrero Londoño (born April 22, 1982, in Armenia, Colombia) is a right-handed Colombian ten-pin bowler who has won Colombian championships and multiple international championships. She has been a member of Team Colombia for twenty years, and another half dozen years on Junior Team Colombia. She has one title (a major) on the PWBA Tour since the rebirth of the Professional Women's Bowling Association in 2015.

Clara had a long sponsorship association with Columbia 300 bowling balls, before signing with Storm Bowling in 2021. She is also sponsored by Turbo grips.

== Bowling career ==
Internationally, Guerrero was chosen 2000 Woman of the Year in Quindio, Colombia, Best Athlete of the Year and Future Athlete of the Year. Other awards to her credit include a second-place finish in the 2006 Women's Challenge, winner of the 2006 Panama Invitational, Colombian National Champion in 2002–05, Silver and bronze medalist in the 1999 and 2003 FIQ World Championship and the Pan-American Games, Silver medalist in the 2000 AMF World Cup, and a two time World Champion in the 2009 Women's World Championships.

In 2003, Guerrero captured bronze medals in singles and doubles at the 2003 Pan American Games. The event, staged at the Sebelen Bowling Center. Guerrero continued her success in international Competition with Team Colombia. She captured the Team Bronze medal at the 2003 World Championship in Malaysia with a world record.

Two years later, Guerrero was crowned the 2005 World Ranking Masters Champion, defeating Wendy Chai of Malaysia, 2–1, in the best-of-three-game finals.

In 2006, Defending World Ranking Masters champion Clara Guerrero took the lead in the American Zone Ranking Final in Panama after the first of three 8-game blocks and never looked back. The Colombian finished atop the women's leaderboard with 4989 24-game total and an average of 207,88 to lock up her spot for the 2006 World Ranking Masters in Kuwait. Only the top three women averaged 200-plus. Guerrero, also won one of the major tournaments in the Caribbean in 2006, the "Panama Invitational". She came to the final as the second seed and she proved that she is one of the best female amateur bowlers in the world. Guerrero eliminated 17-time PWBA champion and WIBC Hall of Famer Robin Romeo, 214–191, in the semi-final. In the championship match, Guerrero topped Wendy Macpherson, 221–201, to cruise to the title. Guerrero received $3,500. Guerrero participated in the USBC Women's Challenge where she took second.

Guerrero is a strong international competitor. She averaged 203.60 in order to capture the 2007-08 Sport Bowling national high average in the U.S. She also became the Colombian National Games champion in 2008. In her mid-20s at the time, some fans dubbed the Colombian bowler the "Hottest Woman in Bowling". She became the Team Colombia Trials Champion in 2009, beating out her nearest competitor, Paola Gomez, by 310 pins. Guerrero averaged 208.00 over 48 games, the highest average in the 2009 Team Colombia Trials for both men and women.

Guerrero added some of the most important world titles to her resume in 2009. She won the All-Events and Masters World Champion titles at the 2009 Women's World Championships. To earn the All-Events medal (combined results of Singles, Doubles, Trios and Team), she fired a 258-game to secure a 5,330 pinfall total and an average of 222.08 over 24 games. All Events gold medalist, Guerrero denied Korea a clean sweep of the Masters event with victory over Hwang Sun-Ok in the title match of the World Women's Championship 2009. But the victory did not come easy as the match was stretched into the fifth and deciding game in the best-of-5 championship Masters finals where Guerrero edged Korea's Hwang Sun-Ok, 203–182 in the deciding game. In the Semifinals match Guerrero posted the highest 3-game series ever in the history of the World Championships behind games of 248, 268 and 289 for an 805 total. Guerrero made history at the World Women's Championships, she is the first bowler ever to win the All-Events and Masters event in the same year.

Guerrero continued her success in 2009. She captured the silver medal in All-Events, Trios, and Teams at the 2009 Pan-American Adult Championship in Puerto Rico. In October, she took first at the Columbia 300 Vienna open in mixed doubles event. Later in November 2009, Guerrero represented her home country at the Juegos Bolivarianos in Bolivia, she earn four gold medals and two silver medals in this competition. Guerrero and her teammates made history earning 11 gold medals out of 15 categories. Guerrero became the 49th Colombian Athlete of the Year. This is the first time in history that a bowler received the prestigious award. Along with Guerrero, athletes from different disciplines were also recognized, in the youth and team categories. The event was held in Bogota, Colombia Wednesday December 2 of 2009 in a very important ceremony with the participation of the highest athletic personalities of the country.

Guerrero was elected as the 2009 Bowler of the Year. Clara achieved what experts believe to be a historic record by winning gold in both All Events and Masters in the 2009 Women's World Championships in Las Vegas in August. She also fared well in the PBA Women's World Championships and was an exempt bowler for the 2009-10 PBA Women's Series season, bringing her numerous nominations for this prestigious award. Another record for Guerrero is that she has made the double, not only being named as the WBW Bowler of the Year but also being inducted into the WBW Hall of Fame. She earned her eligibility from great performances over eleven years.

In March 2010, Guerrero represented her country at the Juegos Suramericanos (South-American Games) held in Medellín, Colombia. She was the star and the queen of these games by winning 6 gold medals and a silver medal. She also made history with her teammates who captured 14 out of 15 gold medals in dispute. Guerrero beat her nearest competitor, Alicia Marcano from Venezuela by more than 200 pins.

In November 2014, Guerrero won the women's title at 50th QubicaAMF Bowling World Cup. 14 years after starting her international career with a runner-up finish at the QubicaAMF Bowling World Cup in Lisbon, Portugal, Guerrero lifted the trophy in Wroclaw, Poland after defeating Sin Li Jane from Malaysia in the best-of-three format, two-games-to-one. Guerrero took the first game, 239–234, but the Malaysian national team member leveled the match with big 257–243 win in game two. Guerrero started the deciding third game with eight consecutive strikes and never looked back, posting a 265–211 victory. Guerrero toppled 747 pins in three games, a record for the World Cup.

In 2015, Guerrero repeated as champion at the 51st QubicaAMF Bowling World Cup, held this year in Las Vegas. She defeated Shannon Pluhowsky from the host country United States, two-games-to-none, to win her second consecutive World Cup title at Sam's Town Hotel, Casino & Bowling Center. The two-time world champion (2009 in Las Vegas) and former World Ranking Masters champion became just the sixth female bowler to win the coveted World Cup trophy twice, and only the third woman to win back-to-back World Cups.

Guerrero won a Singles silver medal at the 2022 World Games in Birmingham, Alabama. After splitting the first two games of the best-of-three final versus USA's Shannon O'Keefe, Clara was defeated 245–225 in the deciding match. Guerrero got her revenge against Shannon at the PanAm Bowling Champion of Champions event held August 22–25 in Rio de Janeiro, Brazil, winning gold in Singles with a 16-game 3,559-3,547 victory over second-place O'Keefe. Clara also won a silver medal in All Events at the Champion of Champions.

=== PBA Tour ===
On October 26, 2013, Guerrero became the third woman in history to make the TV finals for a standard PBA Tour event. (The PBA Tour was typically known as the "men's" tour, but began allowing female competitors in 2004, after the PWBA folded in 2003.) She earned the #4 seed for the stepladder finals of the 2013 PBA Cheetah Championship, joining Liz Johnson (2005) and Kelly Kulick (2010) who have also made the TV finals of PBA Tour events. Guerrero has also won two PBA Regional Tour titles.

=== PWBA Tour ===
Guerrero became a member of the Professional Women's Bowling Association (PWBA) when the PWBA Tour was resurrected in 2015. After claiming no victories in the Tour's 2015 season, her first PWBA title came in a major tournament on June 26, 2016, when she captured the GoBowling.com PWBA Players Championship. Qualifying as the #3 seed, she had to win three matches in the stepladder finals on her way to the $20,000 top prize.

In May 2022, Guerrero, now 40 years old, qualified as the #1 seed out of 204 bowlers at the USBC Queens major. However, she lost her lone match in the May 24 televised finals to #2 seed Birgit Noreiks of Germany, taking home the $30,000 runner-up prize.

== Personal life ==
Guerrero graduated from Wichita State University (USA) in 2006, with a degree in International Business. She now resides in Pflugerville, Texas.
