= Miriam Zetter =

Mexican ten-pin bowler (born 1989)

Personal information
- Full name: Miram Aseret Zetter Velazco
- Born: 14 September 1989 (age 36)

Sport
- Country: Mexico
Medal record
Pan American Games
Silver medal – second place	2011 Guadalajara	Doubles
Silver medal – second place	2019 Lima	Individual
Silver medal – second place	2019 Lima	Doubles

Miram Aseret Zetter Velazco (born 14 September 1989) is a Mexican ten-pin bowler.

Zetter competed at the Pan American Games in 2011, where she won a silver medal in the doubles event alongside Sandra Góngora, and in 2019, where she won silver medals in the individual event and in the doubles event alongside Iliana Lomelí.
