= Aumi Guerra =

Dominican Republic ten-pin bowler

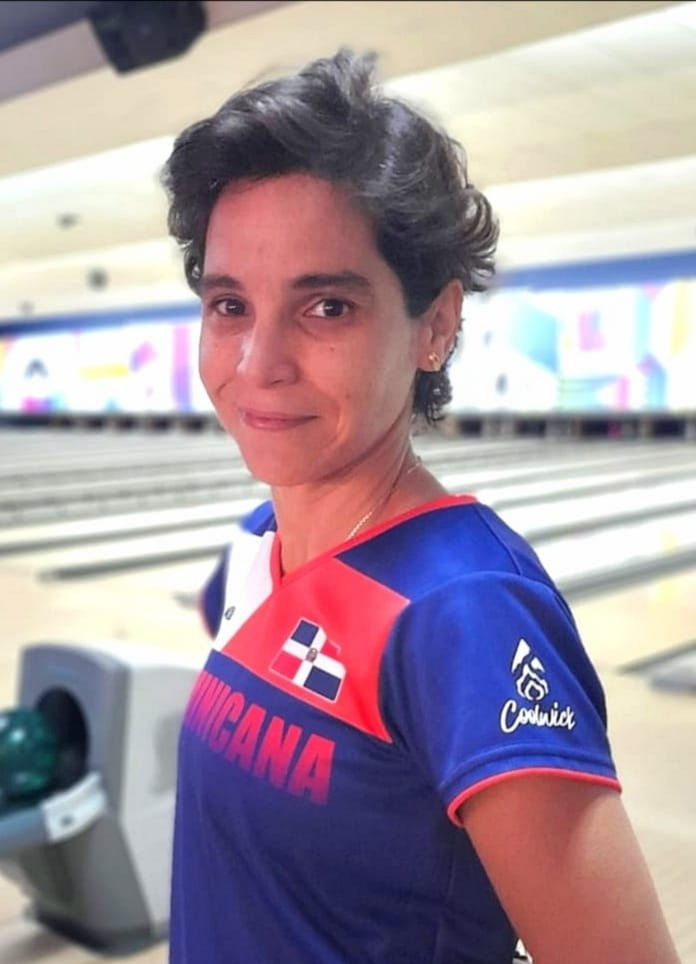

Personal information
- Nationality: Dominican
- Born: Aura Mireya Guerra López; 5 May 1977 (age 49) Santo Domingo, Dominican Republic
- Home town: Santo Domingo, Dominican Republic

Sport
- Sport: Ten-pin bowling
- Turned pro: 2003

Achievements and titles
- World finals: QubicaAMF Bowling World Cup (2010, 2011)
Medal record
Representing Dominican Republic
Pan American Games
Silver medal – second place	2015 Toronto	Singles
Bronze medal – third place	2007 Rio de Janeiro	Singles
Bronze medal – third place	2019 Lima	Doubles
Central American and Caribbean Games
Gold medal – first place	2010 Mayagüez	Doubles
Silver medal – second place	2006 Cartagena	Triples
Bronze medal – third place	2014 Veracruz	Masters
Bronze medal – third place	2014 Veracruz	Singles
- Updated on 16 November 2015

Aura Mireya Guerra López (Note: In this Spanish name, the first or paternal surname is Guerra and the second or maternal family name is López.) (born 5 May 1977) is a Dominican ten-pin bowler who won back to back Qubica AMF Bowling World Cup Titles (2010 & 2011).

== Career ==
Finished in 5th position of the combined rankings at the 2006 Qubica-AMF World Cup in Caracas, Venezuela.

At the 2007 World Ranking Masters held in Lake Wales, Florida, she finished in 3rd position when she lost the semifinal match to England's Zara Glover.

Bronze medallist at the 2007 Pan American Games in Rio de Janeiro. Defeated Colombia's Paola Gómez 2 - 0 to win the bronze medal match in the individual event.

Playing at the 2007 Qubica-AMF World cup, in the city of St Petersburg, Russia, Guerra fished in 7th position after the final round. Champion at the 2008 PABCON Ranking Championships, held in San Salvador, El Salvador. Finished 12th in 2009 PBA Women's Series Tour Trials and earned Exemption to compete in the PBA.

In 2010 she won her biggest title to date at the QubicaAMF Bowling World Cup.

=== 2010 Qubica AMF Bowling World Cup ===
The 46th QubicaAMF Bowling World Cup was held for the third time in France, at Bowling de Provence centre in Toulon. A record 167 bowlers (91 men and a record 76 women) from 92 nations competed. In the women's division, Aumi Guerra became the first bowler from Dominican Republic to win the QubicaAMF BWC, defeating tournament leader the South Korean Gye Min-Young 2-1 (203-226, 202–196, 240–196). This was the third time a Korean bowler finished 2nd (previously in 1997 and 2007). In the men's division, Canadian Michael Schmidt won his second title, joining Paeng Nepomuceno and Arne Stroem as the only male bowlers with at least two BWC titles. Schmidt, who was denied a second title last year, defeated English Matt Miller 2-1 (205-246, 212–207, 224–188).

=== 2011 Qubica AMF Bowling World Cup ===
For the second time after 1993, Northcliff Bowling Center in Johannesburg, South Africa hosted the QubicaAMF Bowling World Cup. The defending champions from 2010, Michael Schmidt and Aumi Guerra, were back for a chance of a repeat title. Incidentally, the 1993 AMF World Cup in Johannesburg also featured both defending champions.

Guerra dominated the women's division in setting records for three-game series (803), five game block (1304), and average after qualifying and top 24 (241.00). She easily clinched the top seed for the stepladder finals, averaging 238.00 for 36 games. In the final she faced 2006 Champion the American Diandra Asbaty. Guerra handily won game 1 behind 11 strikes 266–201. Asbaty won game 2 227–214 to force a game 3. In game 3, Asbaty needed a strike on the 1st shot in the 10th frame to win the title, but left a 10 pin and Guerra prevailed 202–199. Guerra became the fourth woman after Jeanette Baker (1982, 83), Pauline Smith (1981, 93) and Shannon Pluhowsky (2002, '04) and the seventh player overall to win multiple BWC titles. Guerra and Baker are the only players who have successfully defended their title. The men's champion was Australian Jason Belmonte, who proved the old adage that the third time is the charm. In 2004, he qualified as the top seed, only to be eliminated in the knock-out quarterfinals. In 2007, he was the top seed again, but lost in the stepladder finals. This year, he rolled two 300s during qualifying on his way to earning the second seed for the stepladder finals. He defeated Mykhaylo Kalika 2–1 in the stepladder semifinals and came back from a 1–0 deficit in the best of 3 final to defeat top seed and fellow PBA member American Tommy Jones 2-1 (259-279, 247–216, 259–236). Belmonte became the first Australian male to win the QubicaAMF World Cup.

=== 2012 Qubica AMF Bowling World Cup ===
The 48th QubicaAMF Bowling World Cup visited Poland for the first time, held at Sky Bowling Center in Wrocław. Aumi Guerra was attempting to become the first bowler in QubicaAMF World Cup history to win a third BWC title in a row. The women's division was dominated by three women who all averaged over 230 to qualify for the stepladder finals. Guerra qualified as top seed for the stepladder finals and was joined by No. 2 seed English Kirsten Penny and No. 3 seed Shayna Ng from Singapore. Ng defeated Penny in the semifinals 2-0 (246-215, 231–191) to advance to the finals to face Guerra. Guerra won the first game 269–224, needing one more win for the three-peat. However, Ng won the last two games (267-259, 247–169) to become the second Singaporean to win the World Cup. Incidentally, both times Singapore has won the BWC in the women's division, it was against the defending champion.
