= Rocio Restrepo =

Colombian ten-pin bowler

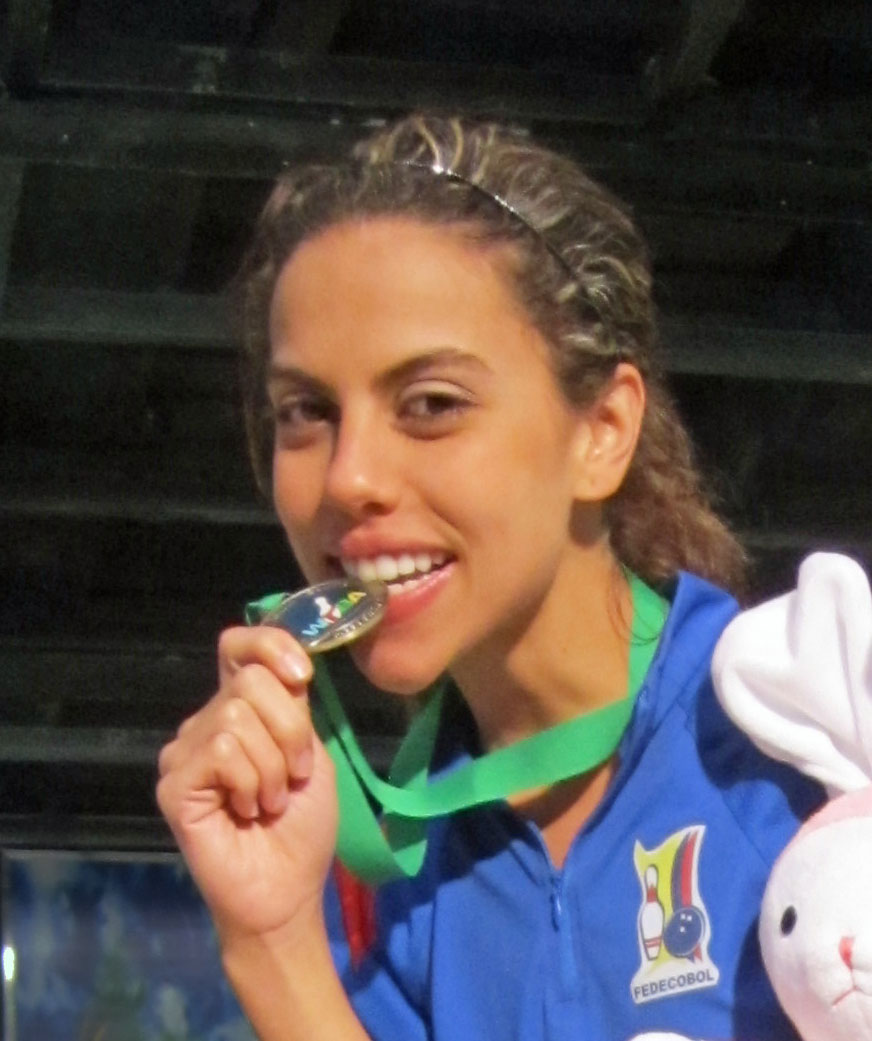
- Restrepo in 2011

Personal information
- Born: Rocío del Pilar Restrepo Lugo; November 21, 1987 (age 38)

Bowling Information
- Affiliation: PWBA
- Rookie year: 2015
- Dominant hand: Right
- Wins: 4 PWBA Tour
- Sponsors: Hammer, VISE, Logo Infusion

Rocío del Pilar Restrepo Lugo (born November 21, 1987) is a Colombian professional ten-pin bowler who now resides in the United States. She bowled collegiately for Wichita State University and now bowls professionally on the Professional Women's Bowling Association (PWBA) Tour. She also bowls internationally as a member of Team Colombia.

After 11 years as a member of the Roto Grip pro staff, Restrepo signed with Hammer Bowling in January, 2026. She is also sponsored by VISE Grip inserts and Logo Infusion.

== Background ==
Restrepo graduated from Wichita State University in 2010 with a degree in Communications and Broadcast Journalism.

== Amateur bowling career ==
At age 15, Restrepo was the youngest bowler to win a medal at the World Championships, receiving a silver medal at the 2003 WTBA World Tenpin Bowling Championship in Kuala Lumpur.

A member of the Colombian national youth team (2002–2008) and Colombian national team (since 2003), Restrepo was a five-time Colombian national champion.

Restrepo bowled at Wichita State University, and was a member of their 2007 and 2009 championship teams at the Intercollegiate Team Championships. She was the 2013 USBC Women's Championships all-events champion and the 2016 USBC Women's Championships Diamond Team champion.

In addition to participating in team wins at various PABCON and WTBA events, Restrepo won the individual gold medal in the Women's Masters division at the 2016 Pan American Bowling Confederation (PABCON) Champion of Champions tournament in Puebla, Mexico.

In 2017, Restrepo won the gold medal in the team competition at The World Games 2017 in Wrocław, Poland.

== Professional bowling career ==
Restrepo has bowled on the PWBA Tour since its rebirth in 2015. She currently owns four PWBA Tour titles, including two victories in the 2016 season.

=== PWBA Tour wins ===
1. 2016 PWBA Greater Detroit Open (Canton, Michigan)
2. 2016 PWBA St. Petersburg-Clearwater Open (Seminole, Florida)
3. 2017 QubicaAMF PWBA Sonoma County Open (Rohnert Park, California)
4. 2018 BowlerX.com PWBA Twin Cities Open (Eagan, Minnesota)

== Personal ==
Restrepo is married to Joe Hostetler. The couple welcomed their first child, daughter Sofia, in June 2023. They reside in Kent, Ohio, USA.
