= Sandra Góngora =

Mexican ten-pin bowler (born 1985)

Personal information
- Born: 6 October 1985 (age 40)
- Home town: Monterrey

Sport
- Country: Mexico
Medal record
World Games
| Bronze medal – third place | 2013 Cali | Mixed doubles |
| Bronze medal – third place | 2017 Wrocław | Doubles |
Pan American Games
| Silver medal – second place | 2011 Guadalajara | Doubles |
| Bronze medal – third place | 2007 Rio de Janeiro | Doubles |

Sandra Góngora (born 6 October 1985) is a Mexican ten-pin bowler.

Góngora competed at the Pan American Games in 2007 where she won a bronze medal in the doubles event alongside Adriana Pérez, in 2011 where she won a silver medal in the doubles event alongside Miriam Zetter, and in 2015.

She attended Wichita State University, where she was named National Collegiate Bowling Coaches Association (NCBCA) MVP and first-team All-American in 2008–09.
