= Karen Marcano =

Venezuelan ten-pin bowler (born 1979)

Personal information
- Born: 27 July 1979 (age 47) Caracas, Venezuela
- Height: 165 cm (5 ft 5 in)
Medal record
Women's Bowling
Representing Venezuela
World Championships
Bronze medal – third place	2013 Las Vegas	Doubles
Bronze medal – third place	2013 Las Vegas	Team of 5
World Games
Bronze medal – third place	2013 Cali	Singles
Central American and Caribbean Games
Gold medal – first place	2006 Cartagena	Trios
Gold medal – first place	2010 Puerto Rico	Masters event
Bronze medal – third place	2006 Cartagena	Team of 5
South American Games
Bronze medal – third place	2026 Santa Fe	Doubles
PABCON
Gold medal – first place	2010 Las Vegas	Masters event
Gold medal – first place	2011	Mixed Doubles

Karen Marcano (born 27 July 1979) is a Venezuelan ten-pin bowler. In 2008 she finished first in the Women's World Ranking Masters. In 2009 she won a gold medal at the Pan American Bowling Confederation Championships in San Juan, Puerto Rico. She also won the bronze medal at the masters event of the World Games in 2013 in Colombia.

== World Tenpin Bowling Championships ==
In the 2013 combined WTBA World Championships in Henderson, Nevada, Karen teamed up with her sister Alicia Marcano. The sisters led the doubles qualifying round with a 2,880 total and a 240 average. Only 21 pins separated them from the World Championships record. However, according to the format of the games, the first-place finisher in the TV semifinals will face the fourth-place finisher from the US duo. They were defeated by the Americans and were forced to settle for bronze with Australia. They also won the team bronze medal at the event.

== Games in the Continent ==
She won two gold medals in masters at Pan American Bowling Confederation Men's Championships (PABCON) Women's and Central American Games in 2010. In 2011 Karen and Amleto Monacelli won the gold medal for the country at PABCON Champion of Champions. She accumulated five medals in the Bolivarian Games, in total Karen has 11 individual titles on the continent.

She finished in 9th position of the combined rankings at the 2006 AMF World Cup.

== Accolades ==
- Bronze medal in doubles at 2015 Pan American Games
- Rolled 300 game at 2015 World Bowling Women's Championships
- Two bronze medals in doubles and team at 2013 World Bowling Women's Championships
- Bronze medal in singles at 2013 World Games
- Bronze medal in singles at 2011 Pan American Games
- Gold medal in Masters at 2010 PABCON Women's Championships
- Gold medal Singles and two bronze medals in trios and Masters at 2009 PABCON Women's Championships
- Gold medal in trios and bronze medal in doubles at 2005 PABCON Women's Championships
- Bronze medals in singles and team at 2001 PABCON Women's Championships

Other Accomplishments and Awards

- Runner-up at 2015 PWBA/PBA Tomball Southwest Open
- 2014 Venezuelan national champion
- 2006 and 2014 South American Games champion
- 2001, 2009 and 2010 Pan American champion
- 2006 and 2010 Central American champion
- Runner-up at 2008 Women's World Ranking Masters
- Four-time Venezuela Bowler of the Year

=== Other Titles ===
- Sur American Games Masters Champion
- Sur American Championship Masters Champion
- Pre-Olimpics Event Masters Champion 2x
- Alba Games Masters Champion
- Tournament of La Raza Masters Champion 2x
- Tournament of La Raza Masters Champion
- World Games "Buena voluntad" Masters Champion
