= Bowler (ten-pin) =

Someone participating in the sport of bowling

A bowler is someone participating in the sport of bowling, either as an amateur or professional. In American ten-pin bowling, a bowler is most commonly a member of a team of three to six people. Most bowling leagues limit the number of team members to five, with alternates available as needed.

There are a number of bowling tournaments held around the world, both large-scale international events and small local competitions. Professional bowlers in the USA are members of the Professional Bowlers Association (PBA).

== Famous bowlers ==
- Jason Belmonte
- Earl Anthony
- Parker Bohn III
- Norm Duke
- Bryan Goebel
- Marshall Holman
- Mika Koivuniemi
- Johnny Petraglia
- Mark Roth
- Dick Weber
- Pete Weber
- Walter Ray Williams Jr.
- E. J. Tackett
- Rafael Nepomuceno
- Marshall Kent
- Bill O'Neill
- Sean Rash
- François Lavoie
- Chris Via
- Kyle Troup
- Jakob Butturff
- A. J. Johnson
- Andrew Anderson
- Kristopher Prather
- Anthony Simonsen
- Dominic Barrett
- Osku Palermaa
- Chris Barnes
- Shawn Maldonado
- Tommy Jones
- Patrick Allen
- Liz Johnson
- Wes Malott
- Mike Aulby
- Carmen Salvino
- Don Carter
- Thomas Larsen
- Mike Fagan
- Tom Hess
- Doug Kent
- Mike Scroggins
- Del Ballard Jr.
- Nelson Burton Jr.
- Dave Soutar
- Jim Godman
- Billy Welu
- Harry Smith
- Dick Hoover
- Buzz Fazio
- Carolyn Dorin-Ballard
- Kelly Kulick
- Ryan Ciminelli
- Dick Allen
- Tim Mack
- Amleto Monacelli
- Jason Couch
- Rhino Page
- Ryan Shafer
- Brian Voss
- Michael Haugen Jr.
- Bob Learn Jr.
- Robert Smith
- Dave Husted
- Steve Cook
- Wayne Webb
- Guppy Troup
- Dave Davis
- Don Johnson
- Teata Semiz
- George Pappas
- Marion Ladewig
- Danielle McEwan
- Clara Guerrero
- Erin McCarthy
- Josie Barnes
- Leanne Barrette-Hulsenberg
- Kim Adler
- Aleta Sill
- Lisa Wagner
- Wendy Macpherson
- Donna Adamek
- Betty Morris
- Patty Costello
- Shannon Pluhowsky
- Dotty Fothergill
- LaVerne Carter
- Wesley Low
- Gary Faulkner Jr.
- Mort Lindsey
- Brandon Bonta
- Alex Horton
- George Branham III
- DeeRonn Booker
- Spencer Robarge
- Packy Hanrahan
- Mitch Hupé
- Randy Pedersen
- Ernie Schlegel
- Steve Nagy
- Tony Reyes
- Du Jianchao
- Wu Siu Hong
- Or Aviram
- Syafiq Ridhwan
- Michael Schmidt
- Bill Hoffman
- Tomas Leandersson
- Tom Hahl
- Peter Ljung
- Paul Moor
- Stuart Williams
- Shannon O'Keefe
- Krizziah Tabora
- Siti Safiyah
- Aumi Guerra
- Jasmine Yeong-Nathan
- Ann-Maree Putney
- Diandra Asbaty
- Lynda Barnes
- Nachimi Itakura
- Cara Honeychurch
- Annette Hagre
- Jeanette Baker
- Bong Coo
- Lita dela Rosa
- Cathy Townsend
- Muhammad Rafiq Ismail
- Remy Ong
- Achim Grabowski
- Ollie Ongtawco
