= PWBA Hall of Fame =

- Type: Hall of Fame
- Website: pwba.com/Players/Hall-of-Fame

The PWBA Hall of Fame is a Hall of Fame established by the Professional Women's Bowling Association to honor individuals "who have dedicated their time and passion to the sport of bowling both on and off the lanes." The inaugural class was in 1995, with ten members being inducted.

== Inductees ==
=== 1995 ===
- Donna Adamek - performance
- LaVerne Carter - pioneer
- Patty Costello - performance
- Helen Duval - pioneer
- Dorothy Fothergill - performance
- Shirley Garms - pioneer
- Mildred Ignizio - performance
- Marion Ladewig - performance
- Betty Morris - performance
- Georgia Veatch - builder

=== 1996 ===
- Janet Buehler - builder
- Doris Coburn - pioneer
- John Falzone - builder
- Nikki Gianulias - performance
- Lorrie Nichols - performance
- Jeanette Robinson - pioneer
- Robin Romeo - performance
- Lisa Wagner - performance
- Donna Zimmerman - pioneer

=== 1997 ===
- Loa Boxberger - pioneer
- Cindy Coburn-Carroll - performance
- Pat Costello - performance
- Fran Deken - builder
- Vesma Grinfelds - performance
- Pearl Keller - builder
- John Sommer Jr. - builder
- Judy Soutar - pioneer

=== 1998 ===
- Joy Abel - pioneer
- Tish Johnson - performance
- Bev Ortner - pioneer
- Aleta Sill - performance

=== 2002 ===
- Dana Miller-Mackie - performance
- Jeanne Naccarato - performance

=== 2003 ===
- Anne Marie Duggan - performance
- Virginia Norton - performance

=== 2019 ===
- Donna Conners - meritorious service/builder
- Paula Carter - ambassador
- Leanne Hulsenberg - performance
- Wendy Macpherson - performance

=== 2020 ===
- Pam Buckner - performance
- Carolyn Dorin-Ballard - performance
- Carol Gianotti - performance

=== 2022 ===
- Kim Adler - performance
- Joan Romeo - meritorious service/builder
- Kim Terrell-Kearney - performance

=== 2023 ===
- Mary Bundrick - meritorious service/builder
- Paula Carter - ambassador
- Cheryl Daniels - performance

=== 2024 ===
- Dede Davidson - performance
- Sandra Jo Shiery - performance

=== 2025 ===
- Marianne DiRupo - performance
- Liz Johnson - performance

=== 2026 ===
- Kelly Kulick - performance
- Cara Honeychurch - performance
- Leila Wagner - meritorious service
