= Donna Adamek =

American tenpin bowler (born 1957)

Donna Adamek (born February 1, 1957, in Duarte, California) is an American tenpin bowler who was named WIBC Bowler of the Year four times (1978–1981). She competed nationally on the Professional Women's Bowling Association (PWBA) Tour.

Adamek grew up in Monrovia, California, about 14 miles northeast of Los Angeles with her parents and her three older siblings. Adamek was quite small and light, unlike other women bowlers who were a lot taller and heavier than her. Despite this, she was able to use a unique style of bowling and become a four time bowling champion in four continuous years. At the beginning of Adamek's career, due to her small stature, she was given the nickname Mighty Mite that was later replaced with Bionic Bowler.

== Career ==
Adamek started bowling at a very young age. Her parents recount that she was beating adult bowlers at age 10 – and even rolled a 200 in the fourth game she ever bowled. In 1975, Adamek, a senior at Monrovia High School received the Alberta E. Crowe Star of Tomorrow Award for being the top junior bowler. That same year Adamek bowled what was an American Junior Bowling Congress all-time high three-game series with a 745, earning her a mention in Sports Illustrated. This success inspired her to turn professional. By 1976, after dropping out of California State University at age 19, she joined the professional circuit, and won her first title as a 20-year old in 1977. Though naturally left-handed, Adamek bowls right-handed.

Donna Adamek was voted the Alberta E. Crowe Star of Tomorrow Award winner as the nation's top junior bowler in 1975 and immediately moved forward as a professional. Adamek had adopted a unique style of bowling, she is naturally left-handed but she bowled with her right hand. Adamek was inducted in the 1995 class of women's professional bowling due to her superior performance in her career.

Donna Adamek was an inductee of the class of women's professional bowling of 1995. Alongside Adamek, other professional bowlers were inducted into that year, such as Patty Costello, Dotty Fothergill, Millie Matorella Ignizio, Marion Ladewig, and Betty Morris. Adamek led the WPBA tour in winnings for three consecutive years in 1978 to 1980 she then teamed up with Nikki Gianulias to win the WIBC doubles title in 1980. During the 1981-1982 seasons, Adamek rolled three perfect 300 games, a record she then shared with four other women bowlers. Adamek later won the Sam's Town Invitational in 1988.

Nicknamed "The Mighty Mite," as she was just five feet, two inches tall and 125 pounds, Adamek dominated women's bowling between 1977 and 1981, winning 13 titles and five of her six career major championships during that span. She won 19 professional titles (tied for ninth most all-time) in her 16-year career as a professional. Among those wins were two WIBC Queens titles (1979 and 1980), two U.S. Opens (1978 and 1981), the WPBA Championship in 1980 and the Sam's Town National Pro-Am in 1988. She is one of only four players in history (with Millie Martorella, Dotty Fothergill and Katsuko Sugimoto) to successfully defend a WIBC Queens title.

These four consecutive wins gave her the nickname, the bionic bowler. She dominated women's professional bowling with such a talent that she dedicated her life to bowling and her future career and the titles she won over the course of her career in the years following. Within Adamek's 16 year career she won 19 professional titles. Among those 19 professional titles were five majors, two USBC Queens titles, two U.S. Open titles, and the Sam’s Town Invitational in Las Vegas.

In the United States Bowling Congress, Donna Adamek was the second woman listed in the Hall of Famers superior performance category. For the talent and achievements, she had achieved in her 16 year bowling career. Later on in her career, after receiving wins and titles and Championships, Dean Lopez gave her the name the Bionic Bowler, due to Donna becoming a local hero of his. When they first met at Columbia bowl in Duarte and because of her arm gear, that's why she was given the name, the Bionic Bowler. After the professional women's bowling association hall of fame returned in 2019, the association recognized Adamek talents and her performance in her career alongside her winnings, and declared her eligible to be re-inducted into the Hall of Fame, back in 2024.

Adamek is a member of the PWBA and WIBC (now USBC) Halls of Fame.

== Professional titles ==
Major championships are in bold text. (Source: 11thframe.com)

1. 1977 Columbia 300 Classic
2. 1977 Dallas-Fort Worth Open
3. 1978 Rockford Open
4. **1978 U.S. Women’s Open**
5. 1979 Montgomery Ward-Ebonite Classic
6. **1979 WIBC Queens**
7. 1979 Pabst Extra Light Open II
8. 1980 Natural Light-Bowl America Classic
9. **1980 WIBC Queens**
10. **1980 Columbia 300-Bowl America WPBA Championship**
11. **1981 U.S. Women’s Open**
12. 1981 Stardust Classic
13. 1981 Bowlers Journal International Classic
14. 1982 Belleville Open
15. 1983 Northwest Fabrics Classic
16. **1988 Sam’s Town National Pro-Am**
17. 1989 Columbia 300 Delaware Open
18. 1991 Robby’s Open
19. 1991 Columbia 300 Delaware Open

== Personal ==
Donna Adamek currently does not bowl anymore; she now works as a woodworker, remodeler and it has become a love in her life in recent years. In an interview with Dave Williams, Adamek commented that she misses one thing from bowling, which is the ‘traveling bug,’ indicating she misses the traveling parts of bowling. She also visits her number one spot outside California, which is Colorado, where her 5-year-old granddaughter lives.
