= Daria Pająk =

Polish-American professional bowler

Personal information
- Full name: Daria Pająk
- Nationality: Polish
- Born: 11 January 1993 (age 33) Piła, Poland
- Home town: Lake Wales, Florida, U.S.
- Education: Webber International University
- Years active: 1999–present
- Height: 173 cm (5 ft 8 in)
- Weight: 85 kg (187 lb)
- Other interests: Bodybuilding
- Website: dariapajak.com

Bowling Information
- Country: Poland
- Sport: Bowling
- Event: PWBA Tour
- Turned pro: 2017
- Dominant hand: Right (cranker delivery)

Achievements and titles
- Personal bests: 1 PWBA Tour win; Multiple 300 games
- Updated on 16 December 2025

Daria Pająk (born 11 January 1993) is a competitive bowler on the Professional Women's Bowling Association (PWBA) Tour in the United States. Following early bowling success in Poland, Pająk moved to the United States in 2012, eventually going professional and earning PWBA 2017 Rookie of the Year.

== Youth and education ==
Born in Piła, Poland, to parents Bozena and Miroslaw Pająk, she was 6 years old when the first bowling facility opened in Poznań in 1999. Daria won the National Youth Championship at age 11 and was selected to represent Poland in the European Youth Championship.

She worked with coach Costas Mitsingas before attending Webber International University in Babson Park, Florida, in 2012. During four years of college, Pająk was a part of a team that won the NAIA championship twice and the Intercollegiate Team Championship, the second biggest title in college bowling after the NCAA championship.

== Career ==
After college, Pająk participated in a few tournaments on the PWBA Tour and PBA Tour. She qualified second for the USBC Queens, made match play at the U.S. Women's Open, and finished ninth at the 2016 PBA World Series of Bowling Cheetah Championship. Later on, bowling companies 900 Global, Turbo Grips, Bowler X and Coolwick sportswear signed her as a pro-staff athlete.

She applied for a pro card to bowl on the PWBA Tour professionally. She won her first PWBA title in the 2017 PWBA Greater Detroit Open and finished second to USBC Hall of Famer Liz Johnson in the U.S. Women's Open. She was named PWBA Rookie of the Year in 2017.

In 2018, she continued the PWBA tour in the United States and also appeared in some European Bowling Tour (EBT) tournaments.

In June 2021, Pajak was invited to participate in the PBA King of the Lanes: Empress Edition event that was televised nationally in the US on Fox Sports 1. She won her first challenge match and held the Empress position for two more rounds, earning $25,000.

== In popular culture ==
Pająk and the Wikipedia article about her were namedropped in the fourth season of What We Do in the Shadows, during the 2022 "Pine Barrens" episode.
