= Shirley Garms =

American tenpin bowler (1924–2018)

Personal information
- Born: January 18, 1924 Illinois, U.S.
- Died: January 25, 2018 (aged 94) Island Lake, Illinois, U.S.

Sport
- Country: United States
- Sport: Ten-pin bowling

Shirley M. Garms (January 18, 1924 – January 25, 2018) was an American tenpin bowler. In consecutive years, 1961 and 1962, she was named woman Bowler of the Year by the Bowling Writers' Association of America. She won the BPAA All-Star championship (later renamed the U.S. Women's Open) in 1962. She was inducted into the United States Bowling Congress Hall of Fame in 1971 and the PWBA Hall of Fame in 1995. She lived in Island Lake, Illinois.
