= Sylvia Wene =

American ten-pin bowler (1928–2013)

Personal information
- Full name: Sylvia Wene Martin
- Born: July 14, 1928 Philadelphia, Pennsylvania, U.S.
- Died: May 19, 2013 (aged 84)

Sport
- Sport: Bowling

Sylvia Wene (July 14, 1928 – May 19, 2013) was an American ten-pin bowler.

== Biography ==
Wene, who was Jewish, was born in Philadelphia, Pennsylvania.

Wene was the first female bowler to score a perfect game in sanctioned competition (on March 28, 1951), and the first to bowl three sanctioned perfect games - the first on March 28, 1951, the second on December 11, 1959, and the third on January 8, 1960. Her second perfect game, on December 11, 1959, during the finals of the World Invitational Match Game Tournament, was the first time a woman had scored 300 in match game competition. Wene won the BPAA Individual Match Game Title in 1955 and 1960, and was named Woman Bowler of the Year by the Bowling Writers Association of America in both of those years. She was a member of the All-America teams in 1955, 1959, 1960, 1961, and 1962. Sylvia authored the book The Woman's Bowling Guide that was published in 1959.

Wene was elected to both the Women's International Bowling Congress Hall of Fame and the United States Bowling Congress Hall of Fame in 1966. She was inducted into the International Jewish Sports Hall of Fame in 1979, and the Philadelphia Jewish Sports Hall of Fame in 1988.

== Personal life and death ==
Sylvia Wene was born to parents Nathan Wene (born 1892) a grocer, and Anna (née Klein, born 1896); a clerk. Wene would go on to marry Samuel Martin. They would remain married until his death in 1984.

Wene died on May 19, 2013, at the age of 84.
