= Joan (Rocco) Haines =

Canadian female bowler (born 1945)

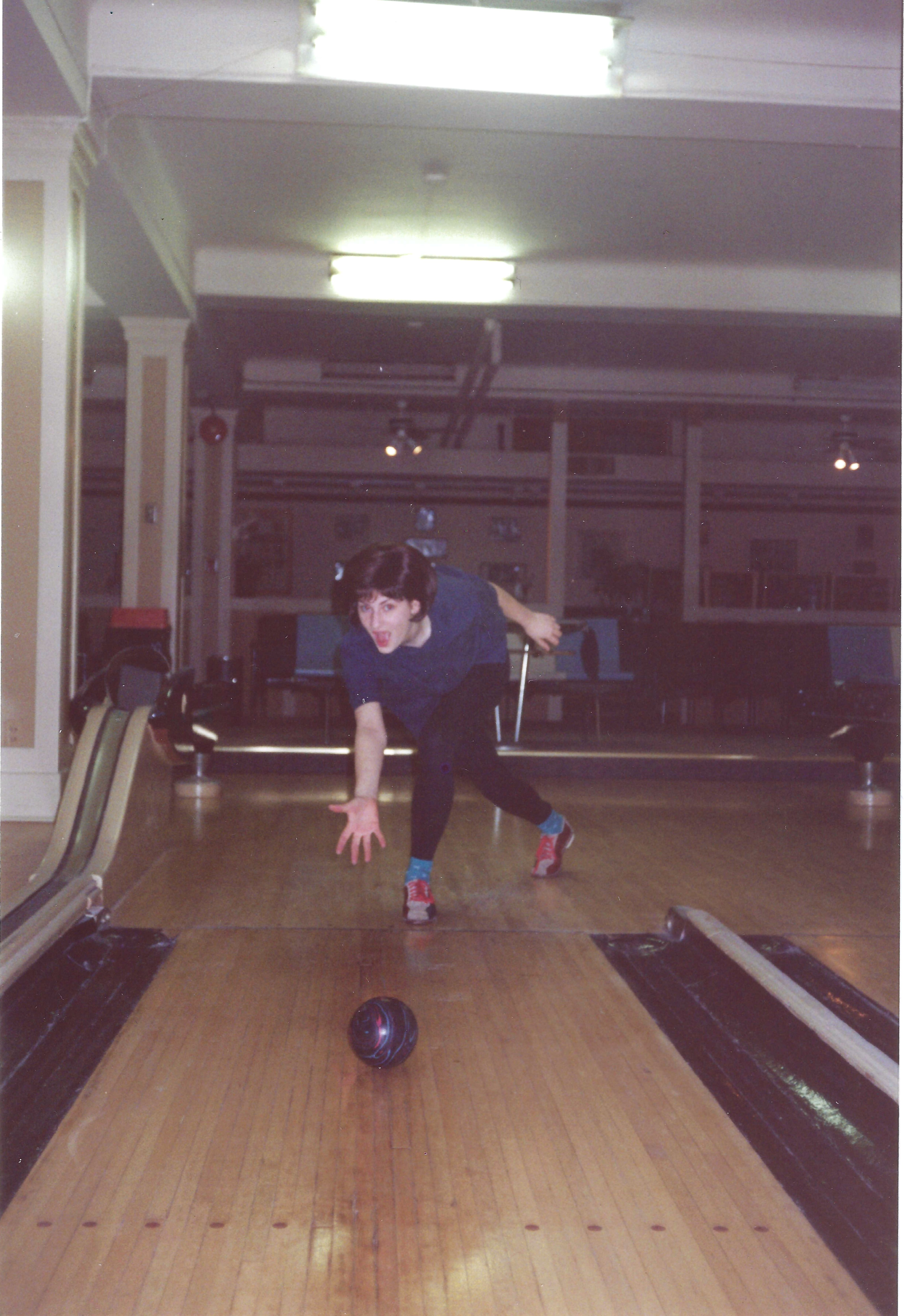

Joan (Rocco) Haines (born September 26, 1945) is a Canadian female bowler.

Joan has been named the world's best female bowler in 1965. She was born in Vancouver on September 26, 1945. Joan received the dubious distinction while participating in a bowlerama, bowl-a-thon at the Commodore Lanes bowling alley in downtown Vancouver in British Columbia, Canada.

Known for her unusual tap-dance like approach to bowling, she became famous when bowling four turkeys in one game. Her photograph still hangs at the lanes today.

A writer on the CBC television show Da Vinci's Inquest paid homage to Joan by writing in a recurring character using Joan's name. However, the name was spelled slightly different, by dropping the "i" from Haines. The part of Joan Hanes was played by Jada Stark. The episodes were: The Squirrels Are of English Descent (2004) Can Bend, But I Won't Break (2004).
