= Kelly Kulick =

American professional ten-pin bowler

Personal information
- Born: March 16, 1977 (age 49) Union Township, New Jersey, U.S.
- Years active: 1998-present

Sport
- Country: United States
- Sport: Ten-pin bowling
- League: PWBA, PBA
- Turned pro: 2001

Achievements and titles
- National finals: 7 PWBA (5 majors); 1 PBA Tour (1 major); 2 PBA Women's Series (1 major); 1 PBA Ladies & Legends; 1 International (Singapore)
Medal record
Women's bowling
Representing United States
Event	1st	2nd	3rd
World Bowling Championships	3	5	3
World Games	2	2	–
Total	5	7	3
World Tenpin Bowling Championships
Gold medal – first place	1999 Abu Dhabi	Singles
Gold medal – first place	2015 Abu Dhabi	Team
Gold medal – first place	2017 Las Vegas	Trios
Silver medal – second place	2011 Hongkong	Doubles
Silver medal – second place	2013 Henderson	Doubles
Silver medal – second place	2013 Henderson	Team
Silver medal – second place	2015 Abu Dhabi	Doubles
Silver medal – second place	2017 Las Vegas	Doubles
Bronze medal – third place	1999 Abu Dhabi	Trios
Bronze medal – third place	2011 Hongkong	Trios
Bronze medal – third place	2015 Abu Dhabi	Trios
World Games
Gold medal – first place	2013 Cali	Mixed doubles
Gold medal – first place	2017 Wroclaw	Singles
Silver medal – second place	2013 Cali	Singles
Silver medal – second place	2017 Wroclaw	Mixed doubles

Kelly Kulick (born March 16, 1977) is an American professional bowler, bowling coach and sportscaster. She has won 7 professional women's bowling titles (5 of them majors), 1 PBA Tour title (1 major), 2 PBA Women's Series titles (1 major), and 1 professional mixed doubles title. Kulick is the first woman ever to win a national PBA Tour title and the only woman to win a major PBA Tour tournament. She is one of only four players in history to win the U.S. Women's Open at least three times. She is a 16-time member of Team USA (1998–2001, 2008, 2010–2020). Kulick is currently a pro staff member for Storm Bowling, Vise grips and High 5 gear.

In 2019, Kulick was inducted into the USBC Hall of Fame, Superior Performance category. In 2026, she was voted into the PWBA Hall of Fame, Performance category. She was officially inducted in a ceremony on May 14, 2026.

She has won four medals at The World Games, including two golds. She has been a color commentator on CBS Sports Network coverage of the PWBA Tour since 2016. Kulick is currently the head coach for Junior Team USA.

== Early life and education ==
Raised in Union Township, Union County, New Jersey, Kulick attended Union High School, where she played on the school's softball team.

== Bowling career ==
=== Overview ===
Kulick is the first woman ever to win a regular Professional Bowlers Association tour title and the only woman thus far to win a major PBA Tour tournament, winning the 2010 PBA Tournament of Champions in Las Vegas on January 24, 2010. After finishing the weekly qualifying as the #2 seed, she defeated #3 qualifier Mika Koivuniemi to advance to the final against 12-time titlist and 2007–08 PBA Player of the Year Chris Barnes. In the final, she threw 10 strikes in a dominating 265–195 win. This earned Kelly a 2-year exemption to compete on the PBA Tour. This feat was followed in November 2017 (although in a non-major tournament) when Liz Johnson won the PBA Chameleon Championship during the 2017 PBA World Series of Bowling.

(The previous high finish for a female in a regular PBA Tour event was second place, accomplished by Liz Johnson at the 2005 Banquet Open. By winning her semifinal match against Wes Malott, Johnson was also the first woman to defeat a man in a televised PBA Tour event. The first woman to defeat a man in a televised championship bowling match was Lynda Barnes, who defeated Sean Rash in the finals of the 2008 USBC Clash of the Champions—a non-PBA made-for-TV event broadcast nationally in the U.S. on CBS-TV.)

Billie Jean King, former tennis superstar and head of the Women's Sports Foundation, summed up the impact of Kulick's TOC victory:

"Kelly Kulick's win at the PBA Tour's Tournament of Champions is not only historic, it serves as a motivational and inspirational event for girls and women competing at all levels all around the world."

Kulick was also one of the invitees to the International Women's Day reception, hosted by Barack Obama and Michelle Obama and held in the East Room of the White House on March 8, 2010.

=== Amateur career ===
Kulick attended and bowled competitively at Morehead State University, where she was a two-time Collegiate Bowler of the Year and two-time All-American. She graduated from Morehead State with a degree in Physical and Health Education.

Kulick has been a 16-time member of Team USA (1998–2001, 2008, and 2010–2020) and was on Junior Team USA in 1998 and 2000. She was part of the 2011 team that took home the United States' first gold medal in the team event of the World Tenpin Bowling Championships since 1987.

Kulick won two medals each at The World Games 2013 in Cali, Colombia and The World Games 2017 in Wrocław, Poland. In December 2015, Kulick and Team USA teammate Danielle McEwan won the gold medal in the doubles competition at the World Bowling Women's Championship in Abu Dhabi, and she was on the Team USA squad that won the gold medal in the team(-of-five) competition.

Overall, Kulick has won 40 medals in international competition.

=== Original PWBA Tour ===
Kulick began her professional career with the Professional Women's Bowling Association (PWBA), winning the 2001 Rookie of the Year Award. She also won the 2003 U.S. Women's Open for her first PWBA Tour title and first major. The PWBA folded following the 2003 season.

=== PWBA Tour hiatus and competing in the PBA ===
After the demise of the PWBA, Kulick began bowling in the PBA Eastern Region. In 2005–06, Kulick cashed in 12 of the 14 regional events in which she competed.

The PBA opened its membership to women in April 2004 after the PWBA folded. The PBA Tour switched to an all-exempt field in 2004–05, with 58 bowlers earning full-time exemptions for each season. Two women — Liz Johnson and Carolyn Dorin-Ballard — had previously gained entry to PBA Tour events through weekly qualifying.

On June 4, 2006, Kulick made history by becoming the first female professional bowler to earn a PBA Tour exemption (see PBA Bowling Tour: 2005-06 season). This allowed her to compete in every PBA event of the 2006–07 season. Kulick was quoted in 2006 as saying, "To be the first woman is huge...words can't even describe the feeling. I feel confident I can be a good enough competitor to stay out on Tour. My next goal is to make a television show and become the first woman to win a PBA Tour title." During the 2006–07 season, however, Kulick only made five cuts, finished 54th in points, and lost her PBA exempt status. Kulick was also unsuccessful in her attempt to regain an exemption for the 2007–08 season at the 2007 PBA Tour Trials.

Kelly rebounded by winning the USBC Queens event in May 2007.

In 2008, Kelly won the PBA Senior Ladies and Legends title with Robert Harvey, and won the PBA Women's Series Shark Championship in 2009.

Also in 2009, Kelly defeated Shannon Pluhowsky, 219–204, to win the inaugural PBA Women's World Championship—the first women's major tournament under PBA sanction, and therefore not a PWBA event or major. The finals were contested September 6, 2009, and aired October 25 on ESPN. With the win, Kulick earned a spot in the 2010 PBA Tournament of Champions, where she was the first-ever female competitor in the field. In this event, which took place in January 2010, Kulick soundly defeated the field of male bowlers to become the first woman to win any PBA Tour event that was also open to men. She also locked up a two-year PBA Tour exemption.

Later in 2010, Kulick won her second USBC Queens crown; the U.S. Women's Open; and the 33rd Malaysian Open. In recognition she was presented with three awards at the PBA Hall of Fame induction ceremonies on January 22, 2011: the 2010 Bowlers Journal Person of the Year, the 2010 World Bowling Writers International Bowler of the Year, and the 2010 Glenn Allison Hero Award.

On June 4, 2011, Kelly won the 44th Singapore International Open.

On June 30, 2011, Kelly had the chance to be the first woman in 32 years to successfully defend a U.S. Women's Open title, when she averaged over 241 during qualifying to capture the #1 seed for the event in Arlington, Texas. But Kulick rolled her lowest game of the entire tournament in the televised finals, getting upset by Leanne Hulsenberg, 218–183. Kelly rebounded by winning the 2012 U.S. Women's Open, in the process becoming only the second woman (after Marion Ladewig) to win the event at least three times. Liz Johnson joined that exclusive group the following year, with her third U.S. Women's Open win.

Kulick won back-to-back World Bowling Tour (WBT) Women's Finals at the World Series of Bowling in Las Vegas, NV. She defeated Missy Parkin in 2013 and Liz Johnson in 2014. The WBT Finals is a non-title tournament, with finalists based on a rolling points list from WBT tournaments over the previous two years.

In 2015, Kulick won the BPAA's Dick Weber Bowling Ambassador Award, an honor given annually to the "bowling athlete who has consistently shown grace on and off the lanes by promoting the sport of bowling in a positive manner."

=== PWBA Tour relaunch ===
Following the rebirth of the PWBA Tour in 2015, Kulick won the title at the PWBA Fountain Valley Open (Fountain Valley, CA) on May 23, 2017. With her previous women's major wins being counted as PWBA titles, Kulick was credited with her sixth PWBA Tour championship. Kulick finished runner-up to Shannon O'Keefe in the final major of the 2017 season (The Smithfield PWBA Tour Championship), while also finishing runner-up to Liz Johnson in PWBA Player of the Year points. She also finished runner-up in the last two majors of the 2018 season, the PWBA Players Championship and PWBA Tour Championship.

On June 5, 2021, Kulick won the PWBA Albany Open for her seventh PWBA Tour title and 12th professional title overall.

== Kelly Kulick's professional titles ==
Major tournaments in bold type.

1. 2003 **U.S. Women's Open**
2. 2007 **USBC Queens**
3. 2008 PBA Ladies and Legends (doubles title with Robert Harvey; PBA Senior Tour event)
4. 2009 PBA Women's Series Shark Championship
5. 2009 **PBA Women's World Championship**
6. 2010 **PBA Tournament of Champions**
7. 2010 **USBC Queens**
8. 2010 **U.S. Women's Open**
9. 2011 Singapore International Open
10. 2012 **U.S. Women's Open**
11. 2017 PWBA Fountain Valley Open
12. 2021 PWBA Albany Open

== In the media ==
Kelly Kulick was featured as a supporting character in Spider-Man's cast, as friend and former girlfriend of Flash Thompson, starting with Friendly Neighborhood Spider-Man #20. She was written into the comic after bowling a pro-am event with the daughter of one of the Spider-Man writers. Her main goal was to have an actual role in the movie, such as Parker's girlfriend. However, it did not happen due to Kulick's objection to a wet-shirt make out scene in Spiderman.

Kulick has also endorsed several clothing lines, including many bathing suit lines, following her win at the Tournament of Champions.

Kulick posed nude (with strategically placed shadows) for ESPN The Magazine's annual "Bodies We Want" issue in October 2011. The issue featured Kulick along with 19 other professional athletes, both male and female. Kulick is the first bowler to ever appear in this issue.

Kulick appears in an ESPN Bridgestone commercial, also including sports reporter Michelle Beadle, in which she rolls a bowling ball made of special rubber down a long lane through three separate sets of ten pins, knocking down all of them along the way. At the end of the commercial, she is seen with the Bridgestone scientist trying to pry the prototype away from him.

From 2016 to the present, Kulick has provided color commentary for CBS Sports Network broadcasts of the PWBA Tour, except in tournaments where she qualified for the televised finals.

== Personal ==
Outside of bowling, Kulick enjoys cooking, country music and line dancing. She is a USBC silver-certified bowling coach. In December 2021, Kulick was named head coach of Junior Team USA.

== Sources ==
- Macur, Juliet (June 15, 2006). "Woman Breaks Pin Barrier by Making the Pro Tour". The New York Times.
- Former Team USA member makes history
- Professional Bowler's Association
- Profile of Kelly Kulick
- USA Today chat transcript June 16, 2006
