= PWBA Players Championship =

The PWBA Players Championship is one of the four major tournaments on the Professional Women's Bowling Association (PWBA) Tour. Unlike the U.S. Women’s Open and USBC Queens, which allow qualifying amateurs to participate, the PWBA Players Championship is open to PWBA members only.

== Tournament history ==
The tournament began as the PWBA Championships in 1960 and ran every year through 1979, with the exception of the 1968, 1970 and 1977 seasons. Through the split and reformation of the organization, it also took the name WPBA Championship. After a long hiatus (1980 through 1994), it returned in 1995 as the Hammer Players Championship and ran every year through 2001. The PWBA ceased operations after the 2003 season. When the PWBA Tour was renewed in 2015, the tournament was not part of that year's schedule, but was brought back as the PWBA Players Championship for the 2016 through 2019 seasons.

The current tournament is contested over five rounds. All participants bowl two nine-game rounds of qualifying, with the field then cut to the top 18. These 18 players bowl two nine-game rounds of match play (17 round-robin head-to-head matches, followed by a position round match). Bowlers receive their scratch score for every game of match play, plus 30 bonus pins for winning a match. In the case of a tie, players receive 15 bonus pins each. The field is then cut to five players, who are seeded for the televised finals based on total score (including all bonus pins).

== PWBA Players Championship winners ==
=== 2019 Event ===
The 2019 PWBA Players Championship was held September 3–8 in Raleigh, North Carolina. The tournament had 50 total entries and an $89,800 prize fund, with a $20,000 top prize. A five-player stepladder format was used for the live televised finals on September 8. Singapore's Cherie Tan won from the #1 seed position to capture her second PWBA Tour title and first major.

Match #1
4 | Dasha Kovalova | 195
5 | Shannon O'Keefe | 222

Match #2
3 | Liz Johnson | 213
5 | Shannon O'Keefe | 257

Match #3
2 | Shannon Pluhowsky | 191
5 | Shannon O'Keefe | 231

Championship Match
1 | Cherie Tan | 245
5 | Shannon O'Keefe | 204

Final Standings:
1. Cherie Tan (Singapore) – $20,000
2. Shannon O'Keefe (Shiloh, IL) – $10,000
3. Shannon Pluhowsky (Dayton, OH) – $6,000
4. Liz Johnson (Palatine, IL) – $5,000
5. Dasha Kovalova (Ukraine) – $4,000

=== Past Champions ===
Listing of all champions dating back to the inaugural 1960 PWBA Championship.

- 2019: Cherie Tan
- 2018: Stefanie Johnson
- 2017: Liz Johnson
- 2016: Clara Guerrero
- Not held 2002–2015
- 2001: Liz Johnson
- 2000: Tennelle Grijalva
- 1999: Lisa Bishop
- 1998: Yvette Smith
- 1997: Marianne DiRupo
- 1996: Kim Adler
- 1995: Anne Marie Duggan
- Not held 1980–1994
- 1979: Cindy Coburn
- 1978: Toni Gillard
- 1977: Not held
- 1976: Patty Costello
- 1975: Pam Buckner
- 1974: Patty Costello
- 1973: Betty Morris
- 1972: Patty Costello
- 1971: Patty Costello
- 1970: Not held
- 1969: Dotty Fothergill
- 1968: Dotty Fothergill
- 1967: Betty Mivalez
- 1966: Judy Lee
- 1965: Helen Duval
- 1964: Betty Kuczynski
- 1963: Janet Harman
- 1962: Stephanie Balogh
- 1961: Shirley Garms
- 1960: Marion Ladewig
