= U.S. Women's Open (bowling) =

Annual bowling tournament

The United States Women's Open, a.k.a. U.S. Women's Open or Women's U.S. Open, is an annual tournament for women, dedicated to ten-pin bowling in the United States. From its inception in 1949 until its cancellation in 2004, after the Professional Women's Bowling Association (PWBA) folded, the event was held every year except for 1953, 1997 and 2002. From 1949 through 1970, the tournament was known as the Bowling Proprietors' Association of America (BPAA) Women's All-Star. From 1971 on, it became known as the U.S. Women's Open. Marion Ladewig won this tournament eight times when it was the BPAA Women's All-Star. Liz Johnson has the most modern era (since 1971) U.S. Women's Open victories with six.

The U.S. Women's Open returned in 2007, being conducted by the United States Bowling Congress (USBC) from that year through 2010. The BPAA announced in June, 2010, that it would resume conducting the tournament, beginning in 2011. The TV finals for the 2011 event took place at Cowboys Stadium in Arlington, Texas, with over 8,000 fans in attendance.

The 2012 tournament held its final round outdoors in Reno, Nevada on a specially-prepared pair of lanes. As the telecast began, winds up to 24 mph (38 km/h) began to deposit dust onto the lane surface, making the lanes virtually unplayable with standard reactive equipment and angles. Players began switching to plastic bowling balls as the dust continued to accumulate. Kelly Kulick survived a 170–160 final match against Missy Parkin to take the title.

The tournament was not held in 2014, due to lack of viable sponsorship. Instead, the BPAA Women's All-Star returned for a year along with the Senior Women's US Open. The U.S. Women's Open returned for 2015, as the USBC and BPAA announced that Bowlmor AMF, the largest operator of bowling centers in the world, had signed on as the title sponsor. The 2015 U.S. Women's Open took place August 31 through September 6 in North Brunswick, New Jersey, as part of the re-launched PWBA Tour.

== Tournament history ==
=== 2026 Event ===
The 2026 U.S. Women's Open was held June 11–16 (PTQ on June 9) at Royal Pin Woodland Lanes in Indianapolis, with the live finals broadcast on CBS Sports Network. The tournament had 108 entries and a total prize fund of $279,000. The top 36 players (1:3) cashed, with $60,000 going to the winner. Fourth-seeded Jillian Martin climbed the ladder, eventually defeating top seed and former U.S. Women's Open champion Sin Li Jane in the championship match. After the two tied the regulation match at 212, Martin won on the fourth ball of sudden death roll-off, getting a strike to Jane's 9-count. It was the fourth PWBA Tour win for Martin and her second major.

A five-person stepladder format was used for the final round.

Match #1
4	Jillian Martin	212
5	Jordan Snodgrass	166

Match #2
3	Diana Zavjalova	166
4	Jillian Martin	172

Match #3
2	Dasha Kovalova	223
4	Jillian Martin	230

Championship Match
1	Sin Li Jane	212 (36)
4	Jillian Martin	212 (37)*

- *Sudden death roll-off results: Martin 37 (X, 7, X, X), Jane 36 (X, 7, X, 9)

Final Standings

1. Jillian Martin (Stow, Ohio) – $60,000
2. Sin Li Jane (Malaysia) – $30,000
3. Dasha Kovalova (Muskegon, Michigan) – $22,000
4. Diana Zavjalova (Riga, Latvia) – $17,000
5. Jordan Snodgrass (Adrian, Michigan) – $13,000

=== Past winners ===
U.S. Women's Open

- 1971 – Paula Sperber
- 1972 – Lorrie Koch
- 1973 – Mildred Martorella
- 1974 – Pat Costello
- 1975 – Paula Carter (née Sperber) (2)
- 1976 – Patty Costello
- 1977 – Betty Morris
- 1978 – Donna Adamek
- 1979 – Diana Silva
- 1980 – Pat Costello (2)
- 1981 – Donna Adamek (2)
- 1982 – Shinobu Saitoh
- 1983 – Dana Miller
- 1984 – Karen Ellingsworth
- 1985 – Pat Mercatanti
- 1986 – Wendy Macpherson
- 1987 – Carol Norman
- 1988 – Lisa Wagner
- 1989 – Robin Romeo
- 1990 – Dana Miller-Mackie (2)
- 1991 – Anne Marie Duggan
- 1992 – Tish Johnson
- 1993 – Dede Davidson
- 1994 – Aleta Sill
- 1995 – Cheryl Daniels
- 1996 – Liz Johnson
- 1997 — Tournament not held
- 1998 – Aleta Sill (2)
- 1999 – Kim Adler
- 2000 – Tennelle Grijalva (née Milligan)
- 2001 – Kim Terrell
- 2002 — Tournament not held
- 2003 – Kelly Kulick
- 2004 — Tournament not held
- 2005 — Tournament not held
- 2006 — Tournament not held
- 2007 – Liz Johnson (2)
- 2008 – Kim Terrell-Kearney (2)
- 2009 – Tammy Boomershine (née Turner)
- 2010 – Kelly Kulick (2)
- 2011 – Leanne Hulsenberg (née Barrette)
- 2012 – Kelly Kulick (3)
- 2013 – Liz Johnson (3)
- 2014 — Tournament not held (BPAA Women's All-Star was held)
- 2015 – Liz Johnson (4)
- 2016 – Liz Johnson (5)
- 2017 – Liz Johnson (6)
- 2018 – Liz Kuhlkin
- 2019 – Danielle McEwan
- 2020 – Not held (COVID-19)
- 2021 – Josie Barnes
- 2022 – Erin McCarthy
- 2023 – Bryanna Coté
- 2024 – Sin Li Jane
- 2025 – New Hui Fen
- 2026 – Jillian Martin

BPAA Women's All-Star

- 1949 – Marion Ladewig
- 1950 – Marion Ladewig (2)
- 1951 – Marion Ladewig (3)
- 1952 – Marion Ladewig (4)
- 1954 – Marion Ladewig (5)
- 1955 – Sylvia Wene
- 1956 (Dec. 1955) – Anita Cantaline
- 1957 (Dec. 1956) – Marion Ladewig (6)
- 1958 – Merle Matthews
- 1959 – Marion Ladewig (7)
- 1960 – Sylvia Wene (2)
- 1961 – Phyllis Notaro
- 1962 – Shirley Garms
- 1963 – Marion Ladewig (8)
- 1964 – LaVerne Carter
- 1965 – Ann Slattery
- 1966 – Joy Abel
- 1967 – Gloria Simon
- 1968 – Dotty Fothergill
- 1969 – Dotty Fothergill (2)
- 1970 – Mary Baker
- 2014 - Shannon Pluhowsky
