= Dotty Fothergill =

American ten-pin bowler (1945–2025)

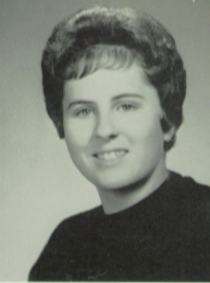
- Fothergill in 1963

Personal information
- Full name: Dorothy Ann Fothergill
- Born: April 10, 1945
- Died: December 23, 2025 (aged 80)

Sport
- Country: United States
- Sport: Ten-pin bowling

Dorothy Ann Fothergill (April 10, 1945 – December 23, 2025) was an American left-handed ten-pin bowler who competed in the Professional Women's Bowling Association (PWBA). In a brief career that was cut short by injury, she won 12 titles on the PWBA Tour, including six major championships. She was named the Woman Bowler of the Year in 1968 and 1969, and defeated many top men's competitors in exhibition play. She sued the Professional Bowlers Association in 1970 when her application to compete in men's tournaments was rejected. She was inducted into the Women's International Bowling Congress (WIBC) Hall of Fame (later merged into the United States Bowling Congress Hall of Fame) in 1980. She was also one of the charter inductees into the PWBA Hall of Fame in 1995.

== Early years ==
Fothergill was raised in North Attleboro, Massachusetts. She graduated from North Attleboro High School in 1963. Also in 1963, at age 18, she finished third in The Boston Globe's Ten Pin Tournament. She supported herself as a secretary at Walpole Lanes.

In 1966, she got a taste of her future success, finishing third at the WIBC doubles tournament in New Orleans. She also joined the PWBA Tour in 1966, acquiring sponsorship from Lincoln Lanes in Rhode Island. She won her first professional tournament at the PWBA Papago Phoenix Open in March 1967, winning $1,850 in prize money. The following month, she tallied a record 2,409 in 12 games to win the women's division in the Sixth Annual Connecticut Cancer Bowlathon.

== Bowler of the Year in 1968 and 1969 ==
Fothergill's career peaked in 1968 and 1969, when she won seven PWBA titles, four of them majors. At ages 23 and 24, she was named woman Bowler of the Year in consecutive years by the Bowling Writers' Association of America (BWAA). In 1968, she became the first woman bowler to win more than $10,000 in one season. A 1969 profile on Fothergill noted that, despite her tiny frame (5 feet 1 inch (155 cm), 110 pounds (50 kg)), she was able to throw a 16-pound (7.3 kg) ball with power and accuracy. The author compared her approach to "a hungry wolf after a lamb chop."

Her tournament victories during those years included:

- May 1968 – She set an all-time WIBC record with a total score of 2,101 in nine games at the Schenectady Press tournament.
- May 1968 – She won the Women's BPAA All-Star championship (later renamed the U.S. Women's Open) in Garden City, New York. She was the first woman to win in her first All-Star appearance and the first left-hander in the men's or women's division to claim an All-Star championship. Her average of 211.11 in 36 games was just short of the record of 211.47 set by Marion Ladewig in 1951.
- August 1968 – She won the PWBA Championship tournament in Flint, Michigan, taking home $3,000 in prize money.
- May 1969 – For the second consecutive year, she won the BPAA All-Star championship held at Hialeah Lanes in Florida, becoming the first player to successfully defend her crown in this event since Marion Ladewig in 1954.
- August 1969 - Fothergill repeated as winner at the PWBA Championship. She outscored Ethel Glasco, 208-192, in the title match to become the first woman to win the championship in consecutive years. It was her sixth PWBA title in her three-year career to that point.

== Lawsuit to compete in men's tournaments ==
Despite being the best female bowler, Fothergill's total earnings over a three-year period were less than the prize money for some single men's tournaments. A competitor finishing 20th in a men's tournament earned as much as the first-place finisher in a women's tournament. In May 1969, she noted that she might seek to compete in men's tournaments. Her league and tournament averages were as good as 99% of the professional male bowlers. She also defeated many of the top men's bowlers, including Jim Stefanich (by 115 pins), Dick Weber (by 105 pins), Billy Hardwick (by 113 pins), and Dick Ritger (by 79 pins), in exhibition matches.

When she submitted an application to participate in the men's tournament, the executive board of the Professional Bowlers Association (PBA) voted to reject it. Fothergill recounted the reaction of male bowlers to her application: "A lot of pros have told me, 'Now listen, Dotty, if it were only you it wouldn't be bad at all. But if you get in, how many other women are going to try to do the same thing? ... What would we tell our wives?' And I tell them, 'What do you tell your wives about the girls who travel the tour now and don't bowl?'"

Fothergill filed a lawsuit against the PBA seeking $2.5 million in damages on the grounds that the organization had deprived her of the ability to make a sufficient living based on her sex. The PBA responded with a countersuit seeking $6 million in damages for injury to its reputation and bringing "disastrous ridicule" to the organization.

Specifics as to the resolution of the suit are unclear, though one account published in 1993 indicated that Fothergill "found she had too many problems to continue the fight."

== Later years ==
Fothergill continued to compete on the women's professional tour from 1970 to 1976. In 1970, she tied a record that remains unbroken with event titles in team, singles and all-events at a single Women's Championship and establishing an all-events record with a score of 1,984. She also won consecutive Women's International Bowling Congress (WIBC) Queens championships in 1972 and 1973. She also won WIBC doubles championships (with Mildred Martorella) in 1971 and 1973. She was also the only WIBC bowler to win national titles in singles, doubles, all-events, and Queens.

Over the course of her career, Fothergill won a total of 12 titles in professional competition and another six titles in the WIBC Open Championships.

Fothergill sustained an arm injury in 1976 that ended her career as a competitive bowler at age 31. The injury required surgery.

In December 1979, Fothergill was voted into the WIBC Hall of Fame, and officially inducted in April 1980. She was also one of the charter inductees into the PWBA Hall of Fame in 1995.

She lived in later years in Center Ossipee, New Hampshire. She died in December 2025 at age 80.

== Professional titles ==
Major championships in bold text. (Source: 11thframe.com)

1. 1967 Papago Phoenix Open
2. **1968 BPAA All-Star** (U.S. Women's Open)
3. 1968 Denver Open
4. **1968 PWBA Championship**
5. 1968 PWBA Invitational
6. 1969 Canton Open
7. **1969 BPAA All-Star** (U.S. Women's Open)
8. **1969 PWBA Championship**
9. 1971 Ebonite Cavalcade of Stars
10. **1972 WIBC Queens**
11. 1972 Long Island Open
12. **1973 WIBC Queens**

== See also ==
- PWBA Hall of Fame
- Women's International Bowling Congress
