= Leanne Barrette =

American ten-pin bowler (born 1967)

Personal information
- Full name: Leanne Barrette-Hulsenberg
- Born: Leanne Barrette; August 18, 1967 (age 59)
- Years active: 1987–present

Bowling Information
- Affiliation: PWBA, Senior Team USA
- Dominant hand: Right
- Wins: 27 (2 majors)
- Sponsors: Storm Bowling
Medal record
Women's bowling
Representing United States
World Bowling Senior Championships
Gold medal – first place	2017 Munich	Team
Silver medal – second place	2017 Munich	Singles
Silver medal – second place	2017 Munich	Doubles
Gold medal – first place	2017 Munich	All-Events
Gold medal – first place	2019 Las Vegas	Team
Gold medal – first place	2019 Las Vegas	Doubles
Gold medal – first place	2019 Las Vegas	All-Events

Leanne Barrette-Hulsenberg (born August 18, 1967), from Roseville, California and currently of Pleasant View, Utah, was one of the top female professional bowlers on the Professional Women's Bowling Association (PWBA) Tour. In her original career that spanned 17 years, she won 26 PWBA titles and was a three-time PWBA Player of the Year (1990, 1991 and 2002). In 2007, she was elected to the USBC Hall of Fame for Superior Performance, and was inducted with the 2008 class. In 2011, she won the U.S. Women's Open for her 27th PWBA title, giving her the third-most titles all-time. She was inducted into the PWBA Hall of Fame in 2019, as a member of the first Hall of Fame class since that organization suspended operations in 2003.

== Bowling career ==
After turning pro at age 19 in 1987, Barrette caught on quickly, winning three PWBA titles and Rookie of the Year honors. Her best pro season was in 1991, when she won three titles, was the PWBA tour's leading money winner, and captured both PWBA Player of the Year and the Bowling Writers Association of America's Bowler of the Year honors. Having also won PWBA Player of the Year in 1990, she became the first player in PWBA history to win this award in back-to-back seasons. In 1999, she won the prestigious USBC Queens tournament (then known as the WIBC Queens) for her first major title.

Given that she was still in her prime (winning five titles between 2001 and 2002), bowling writers like Richard Kolb speculated that Barrette had the best shot to eclipse Lisa Wagner's record of 32 PWBA titles. However, the PWBA held only eight events in 2003 before going on an 11-year hiatus (2004 through 2014), denying Leanne the opportunity to add more titles to her career resumé.

On June 30, 2011, Leanne won her 27th professional title (and first since 2002) when she defeated defending champion Kelly Kulick at the U.S. Women's Open in Arlington, Texas. She made a run at a second USBC Queens crown in 2013, finishing runner-up to Diana Zavjalova.

Nicknamed "Boomer," she was a familiar face in the heyday of televised women's bowling, making over 100 total TV appearances. During her career, she also won two Robby Awards—an award for sportsmanship and professionalism voted on by her PWBA peers. She is one of only four women to earn over $1 million (U.S.) in her career on the PWBA Tour.

Hulsenberg has been part of Senior Team USA (for players age 50 and over) since 2017. Together with her teammates, she won team gold medals in 2017 and 2019 at the World Bowling Senior Championships. She also won All-Events gold in 2017 and 2019. In 2019, Leanne won gold in Doubles with partner Tish Johnson.

== Professional titles ==
Major championships in bold text. (Source: 11thframe.com)

1. 1987 Columbia 300 Invitational*
2. 1987 Ebonite Invitational I*
3. 1987 Ebonite Invitational II*
4. 1988 AMF Virginia Classic
5. 1988 Columbia 300 Classic
6. 1989 Lady Ebonite Classic
7. 1989 Albuquerque Open
8. 1990 Garland Open
9. 1990 Brunswick Open
10. 1990 Hammer Western Open
11. 1991 Lady Ebonite Classic
12. 1991 Brunswick Open
13. 1991 Denver Classic
14. 1992 Hammer Eastern Open
15. 1994 Alexandria Louisiana Open
16. 1996 Lubbock Open
17. 1997 Omaha Open
18. 1998 AMF Greater Atlanta Open
19. 1998 Lehigh Valley Classic
20. 1999 Greater Atlanta Open
21. **1999 WIBC Queens**
22. 2001 Lady Ebonite Kentucky Classic
23. 2001 Storm Challenge
24. 2002 Empire State PWBA Classic
25. 2002 Greater Syracuse Classic
26. 2002 Three Rivers Open
27. **2011 U.S. Women’s Open**
- *Tournament conducted by Ladies Touring Players Association (LTPA). All others conducted by PWBA.

== Personal ==
During the early part of her professional career, Leanne resided in Oklahoma City, her father having been transferred there by General Motors in 1983.

Leanne's husband, Gary Hulsenberg, is a Vice President of Sales and Marketing for Storm Bowling in Brigham City, Utah, which prompted their move to the state. Leanne now also works for Storm as the Tournament and Events Manager and works with the youth and charity arm of Storm. The couple has a son, Barrett, born in 2009.
