= Mort Lindsey (bowler) =

American ten-pin bowler

Mort Lindsey (December 20, 1888 – May 16, 1959) was an American bowler and an inaugural member of the American Bowling Congress Hall of Fame in 1941.

Mort Lindsey

He started out having interests in baseball and billiards and began bowling in 1902. A fearless competitor, he was also "one of the first of the game's colorful performers." He remained a competitive bowler into his 60s. He won three ABC titles and had the best tournament average score from 1916 to 1925. In 1927 he was listed as one of the world's top ten bowlers. He was considered the greatest money bowler of his time. Although most of his tournament wins were in the New York area, he won the Peterson Classic in Chicago, the richest prize tournament in the early days of the sport. In 1951 he was an inaugural member of the U.S. Bowling Congress New York City Hall of Fame. In 1997 he was inducted into the International Jewish Sports Hall of Fame.
