= Betty Morris (bowler) =

American bowler (born 1948)

Betty Ruth Burton Morris-Laub (born May 10, 1948) is an American professional bowler, who won seventeen professional tournaments in her career, including 16 titles (2 majors) on the PWBA Tour. Bowlers Journal named her Woman Bowler of the Decade for the 1970s. A December 1999 Bowlers Journal International poll rated her as the fiftieth greatest bowler, male or female, of the twentieth century. That year twenty bowling experts polled by the Miami Herald also rated her as the sixth greatest woman bowler of the century. She is a member of the PWBA and WIBC (now USBC) Halls of Fame.

== Life ==
Betty Burton was born on May 10, 1948, in Sonora, California. She attended Linden High School in Linden, California and then San Joaquin Delta College.

Aged 17 she won the California State Match Game title. She won her first professional tournament, the 1972 Showboat Classic in Las Vegas, despite being six months pregnant. She won her first major title at the 1973 PWBA Players Championship. 1974 was a career year. In the 1974 season's 15 tour stops, Morris won three titles and finished runner-up seven times, including runner-up finishes at the WIBC Queens and U.S. Women's Open majors. She won her second major title at the 1977 U.S. Women's Open. After a five-year title drought (1981 through 1985), Morris won four titles over the 1986 and 1987 seasons, and was named PWBA Player of the Year in 1987.

Morris also had six wins in the WIBC (now USBC) national tournament: she won all-events in 1976 and 1979, won in singles in 1979 and 1980, and was a member of the winning team in 1974 and 1989.

During the 1970s, Burton married Bob Morris and worked in real estate alongside her bowling career. She kept up that career upon retirement from competitive bowling. In 1988 she became an advisor to AMF Bowling. On February 24, 2001, she married professional bowler Larry Laub. She was National Sales Manager for the National Bowling Stadium in Reno, Nevada from 2001 to 2004, and in 2008 became marketing director for Bowling World newspaper.

== PWBA Tour titles ==
Major championships in bold text. (Source: 11thframe.com)

1. 1972 Showboat Classic (Las Vegas, Nevada)
2. **1973 PWBA Championship** (Flint, Michigan)
3. 1974 Akron Savings & Loan Classic (Akron, Ohio)
4. 1974 Showboat Classic (Las Vegas, Nevada)
5. 1974 St. Louis Classic (St. Louis, Missouri)
6. 1976 Brunswick Women's World Invitational (Baltimore, Maryland)
7. 1976 AMF Grand Prix of Bowling (Allen Park, Michigan)
8. **1977 U.S. Women's Open** (Milwaukee, Wisconsin)
9. 1977 AMF Grand Prix of Bowling (Allen Park, Michigan)
10. 1978 Max Gochman Academy Surplus Open (Austin, Texas)
11. 1979 Montgomery Ward/Brunswick Classic (Bloomington, Minnesota)
12. 1980 Pabst Extra Light Classic (Clearwater, Florida)
13. 1986 Brunswick L.A. Open (Anaheim, California)
14. 1987 Lake Charles Classic (Lake Charles, Louisiana)
15. 1987 Lady Fairlanes Open (Houston, Texas)
16. 1987 Tempe Open (Tempe, Arizona)

== Awards and Honors ==
- 3x Bowling Writers Association of America Bowler of the Year (1974, 1977, 1987)
- PWBA Player of the Year (1987)
- Bowlers Journal Woman Bowler of the Decade for the 1970s
- Ranked #50 on the Bowlers Journal International list of top bowlers of the 20th Century, male or female
- Inducted into USBC Hall of Fame in 1983
- Inducted into PWBA Hall of Fame in 1995
