= Patty Costello =

American ten-pin bowler (1947–2009)

Personal information
- Born: May 8, 1947 Washington, D.C., U.S.
- Died: April 16, 2009 (aged 61) Scranton, Pennsylvania, U.S.
- Years active: 1968–1986 (professional bowling)
- Spouse: Steve Dain (1979; divorced 1985)

Sport
- Sport: Ten-pin bowling

Patricia Ann "Patty" Costello (May 8, 1947, Washington, D.C. – April 16, 2009, Scranton, Pennsylvania) was an American professional ten-pin bowler and former member of the Professional Women's Bowling Association (PWBA). She was one of the best female bowlers of the 1970s and 1980s. Costello is a member of the USBC and PWBA Halls of Fame.

Born to William Joseph and Marjorie Moran Costello in Washington, D.C., the left-handed Costello did not begin bowling until the age of 16, but she quickly made a name for herself in the sport, winning three titles in 1970.

== Professional career ==
Over her bowling career, Costello earned 26 professional titles (25 in PWBA-recognized events), including five major championships. Her majors include three titles in the PWBA Players Championship (1971, 1972, 1976), a 1976 U.S. Women's Open victory, and a win at the 1985 LPBT Tournament of Champions.

In 1976, she won six PWBA events (two majors), setting a record for most titles earned in a year as well as earning a then-record $41,000 (about $240,000 in 2026 dollars). The record of six titles in a season was later amended to seven when LPBA events became officially recognized by the PWBA. Carolyn Dorin-Ballard matched this record with seven wins in 2001, although Dorin-Ballard competed in eight more events. Costello was named Female Bowler of the Year by the Bowling Writer's Association of America in 1972 and 1976.

Costello's career suffered a setback in late 1977, when her father suddenly died of a heart attack while watching her provide commentary for a bowling telecast. Afterwards, she experienced depression and anxiety attacks for several years. She told Bowling Digest in 2002, "I was so ultrasensitive to everything around me that I could feel the hair on my arms standing straight up, and no one could comprehend that. I would go to doctors and tell them my symptoms, and they'd look at me like I was ready for the psych ward. It was an awful, lonely place to be." However, Costello recovered and won three titles between 1979 and 1981. Patty won three more championships in 1985, including her fifth and final major at the LPBT Tournament of Champions, and was named PWBA Player of the Year by her fellow bowlers. Her final title was earned at the 1986 Ebonite Firebolt Classic. She bowled in her final professional event at the 1993 WIBC Queens, finishing second.

In addition to her professional accomplishments, Patty won a pair of WIBC (now USBC) Open Championship titles in the Classic Team category (1970 and 1972). Costello is a member of the United States Bowling Congress Hall of Fame (inducted 1989), and was inducted into the PWBA Hall of Fame with the inaugural 1995 class.

== Costello's professional titles ==
Major championships in bold text. (Source: 11thframe.com)

1. 1970 Columbia 300 Open
2. 1970 Showboat Open
3. 1970 Canton Open
4. 1971 Ebonite Open
5. **1971 PWBA Championship**
6. 1972 Japan Starlanes Classic
7. 1972 Sacramento Classic
8. 1972 El Cajon Classic
9. **1972 PWBA Championship**
10. 1972 Ebonite Cavalcade of Stars
11. 1976 Greater Akron Classic
12. 1976 LPBA Classic (L)
13. **1976 U.S. Women’s Open**
14. 1976 Miami Open
15. 1976 Jamestown Open (L)
16. 1976 Columbia 300 Classic
17. **1976 PWBA Championship**
18. 1977 National Bowling Council Mixed Doubles (w/Paul Colwell)
19. 1977 Miami Classic
20. 1979 Robby’s Chicago Classic
21. 1980 Pabst Extra Light Classic II
22. 1981 Pabst Extra Light Classic
23. 1985 Hammer Midwest Open
24. 1985 Fairhaven Classic
25. **1985 LPBT Tournament of Champions**
26. 1986 Ebonite Firebolt Classic

L = Tournament conducted by LPBA.

== Accomplishments and honors ==
- 26 professional titles (5 PWBA majors)
- 2x BWAA Female Bowler of the Year (1972, 1976)
- 1985 PWBA Player of the Year
- USBC Hall of Fame inductee (1989)
- PWBA Hall of Fame inductee (1995)

== Personal ==
Patty Costello had the identical name as another professional bowler from Union City, California. Both were born Patricia Ann Costello, and both were of Irish descent and about the same age. The bowler known as "Pat" Costello (or "California Pat") won 13 titles between 1968 and 1981. The other main distinction is Pat bowled right-handed, while Patty was left-handed. Both women are in the PWBA Hall of Fame.

Costello lived with and subsequently became married to Steve Dain. They had divorced by 1985.

After retiring from competitive bowling, Costello began a career as a transport driver with the Community Medical Center in Scranton, Pennsylvania. "Bowling was my job then; this is my job now. In both cases, I've always been happy to meet people, talk to them, and get them feeling good to be around me", she told Bowling Digest.

Later in life, Patty was stricken with pancreatic cancer, passing away in 2009 at the age of 61.
