= Wendy Macpherson =

American ten-pin bowler (born 1968)

Personal information
- Born: January 28, 1968 (age 58)

Bowling Information
- Sport: Tenpin bowling
- Affiliation: PWBA, JPBA
- Rookie year: 1986
- Dominant hand: Right
- Wins: 20 PWBA Tour (6 majors); 10 JPBA Tour
- Sponsors: AMF, Columbia 300, Hammer, Contour grips, VISE grips, Mongoose wrist devices

Wendy Macpherson (born January 28, 1968) is an American ten-pin bowler. She was born in Walnut Creek, California, and currently lives in Henderson, Nevada, having moved to that area in 1991. She is a member of the USBC and PWBA Halls of Fame. She was at various times sponsored by AMF Bowling, Columbia 300, Hammer, Contour power grips, VISE grips and Mongoose wrist devices.

== Career ==
Macpherson captured 20 career titles (tied for seventh most all-time) on the Ladies Pro Bowlers Tour and Professional Women's Bowling Association Tour before the tour folded in the fall of 2003, and was a four-time Bowling Writers Association of America Female Bowler of the Year. Among her titles are six major championships. She is the all-time leader in career PWBA earnings ($1,232,910 U.S.). She also holds the record for highest earnings in a single PWBA season, with $165,425 in 1997. She has rolled 28 perfect 300 games in professional competition.

Macpherson won her first pro title at age 18 years, 68 days in the 1986 U.S. Women's Open, while she was still a high school senior. This made her the youngest player to win a PWBA Tour event, a distinction that stood until 2021, when Jillian Martin, age 17 years, 16 days, won the PWBA BowlTV Classic. Macpherson remains the youngest player to win a PWBA major event. She also won the USBC Queens event three times (1988, 2000 and 2003).

On July 2, 2006, she became the first female bowler to win a USBC Open Championships title when she fired an 812 series (248, 300, 264) in the singles competition; it was nine days after the death of her father.

In December 2008, Macpherson was elected to the USBC Hall of Fame for Superior Performance; she was inducted with the 2009 class. She was elected to the PWBA Hall of Fame in 2019, as a member of the first Hall of Fame class since that organization suspended operations in 2003. She is also a member of the Southern Nevada Sports Hall of Fame, inducted in 2008.

Macpherson has also competed in the PBA Women's Series, sponsored by the USBC. Making the field of 16 for the Bayer Earl Anthony Medford Classic as an alternate in January 2009, she eventually won the title over previous Women's Series champion Stefanie Nation, 199-184.

Macpherson started competing in the Japan Professional Bowling Association (JPBA) in 2004, winning the 2004 JLBC Prince Cup in her first appearance. During her JPBA years, she earned ten JPBA titles, including the 34th ABS Japan Open in 2010, where in the final match she pocketed 10,000,000 Yen (approx. $121,000) as a bonus for bowling a 300 game.

== Professional titles ==
=== PWBA Tour titles ===
Major championships in bold text. (Source: 11thframe.com)

1. **1986 U.S. Women’s Open**
2. 1987 AMF Virginia Classic
3. **1988 WIBC Queens**
4. **1990 Sam’s Town Invitational**
5. 1993 Las Vegas Western Open
6. 1995 Omaha Lancers Open
7. 1996 Texas Border Shoot-Out
8. 1996 Greater Little Rock Classic
9. 1996 Three Rivers Open
10. 1997 Lubbock Open
11. 1997 Storm Doubles (w/Darris Street)
12. 1997 Columbia 300 Delaware Open
13. 1997 Baltimore Eastern Open
14. 1998 Track Triton TKO Open
15. 1999 St. Clair Classic
16. **1999 Sam’s Town Invitational**
17. **2000 WIBC Queens**
18. 2000 Southern Virginia Open
19. 2001 Columbia 300 Open
20. **2003 WIBC Queens**

=== PBA Women's Series titles ===
1. 2009 Bayer Earl Anthony Medford Classic
