= Liz Johnson (bowler) =

American ten-pin bowler

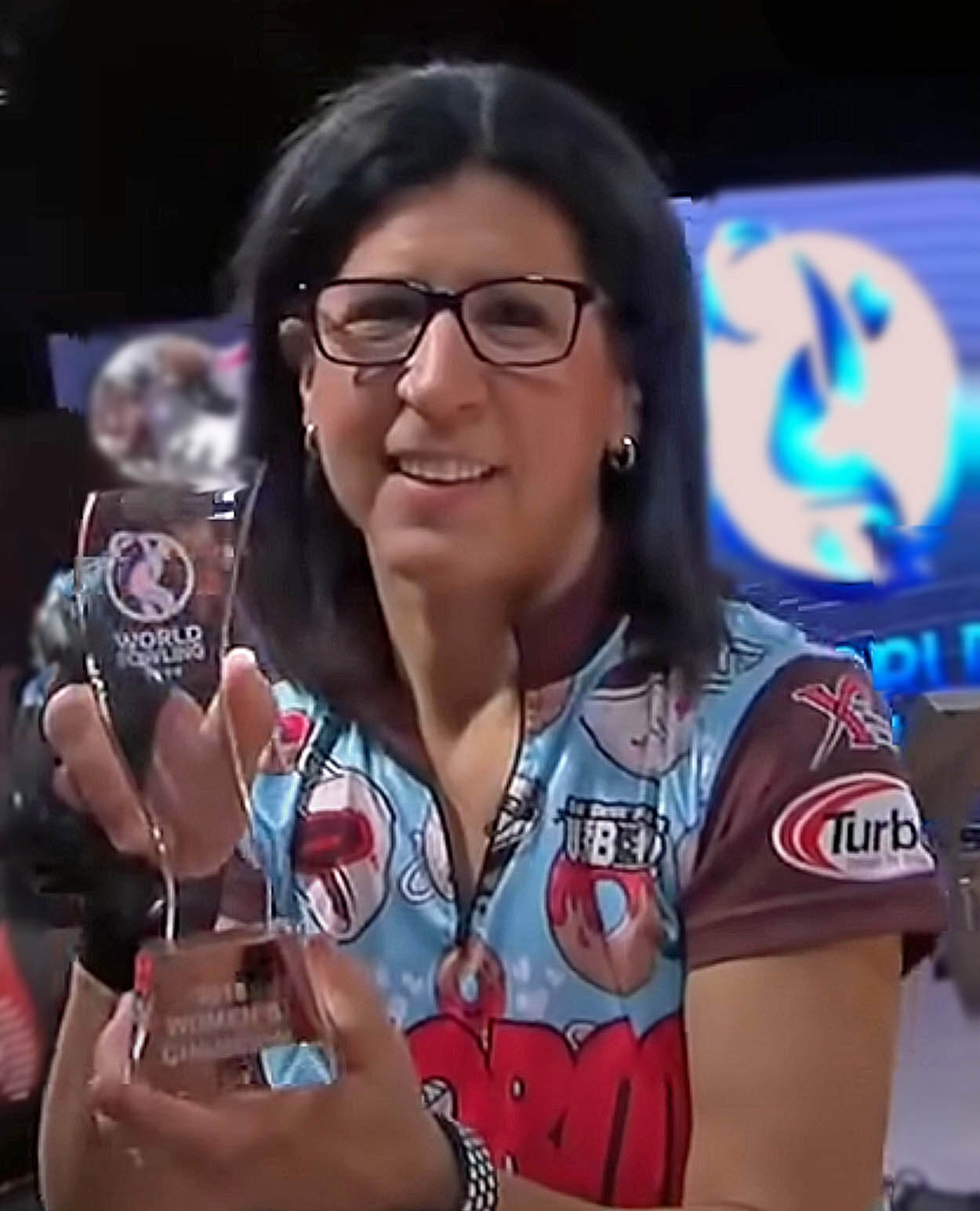
- Johnson at the 2019 World Bowling Tour Women's Finals

Personal information
- Born: Elizabeth Ann Johnson; May 2, 1974 (age 52) Cheektowaga, New York, U.S.
- Years active: 1994–present

Bowling Information
- Affiliation: PWBA, PBA
- Dominant hand: Right (stroker delivery)
- Wins: 25 PWBA (10 majors); 2 PBA Women's Series; 1 PBA Tour; 1 PBA Ladies & Legends; 1 PBA50 Tour; 2 USBC Senior titles
- Sponsors: Storm Products, Master, High 5 Gear, Turbo Grips, UCANBOWL2 Pro Shop

Elizabeth Ann Johnson (born May 2, 1974) is an American professional bowler who currently competes on the Professional Women's Bowling Association (PWBA) Tour, and in some events on the PBA Tour and PBA50 Tour. She initially became known as an 11-time winner on the PWBA Tour, which included the first of her six U.S. Women's Open titles in 1996, before that organization suspended operations in 2003.

Since the rebirth of the PWBA in 2015, Johnson has won eleven more PWBA Tour titles for a total of 25 PWBA titles, ten of which are majors. This includes 22 titles on the PWBA Tour and three more major titles she won during the Tour's hiatus, which have retroactively been counted as PWBA titles. She won four additional professional titles during the PWBA Tour's hiatus, becoming a member of the Professional Bowlers Association (PBA) and the PBA Women's Series. Johnson was elected to the United States Bowling Congress Hall of Fame in December 2014, and was officially inducted on April 29, 2015. In January 2025, Johnson was elected to the PWBA Hall of Fame. She was officially inducted during a May 14 ceremony at the USBC Queens event.

At the 2005 PBA Banquet Open, Johnson became the first woman to defeat a man in a televised PBA Tour event, winning the semifinal match over Wes Malott. On November 18, 2017, Johnson became the second female bowler (after Kelly Kulick who won the 2010 PBA Tournament of Champions) to win a national PBA Tour title, the third woman to defeat a man in a televised championship bowling match (the first was Lynda Barnes at the 2008 Clash of Champions, an event not hosted by the PBA Tour) and the first to win a non-major (standard) PBA Tour title. On June 25, 2026, she also became the first woman to win a title on the PBA50 Tour.

Johnson is currently a pro staff member for Storm, Turbo Grips, High 5 gear, Master bowling products and UCANBOWL2 Pro Shop.

== Personal life ==
Born in Cheektowaga, New York, Johnson was a standout youth softball player, playing the sport from age eight through her high school graduation at Niagara-Wheatfield High School in Sanborn, New York. Primarily a pitcher, she won 60 games during her high school years. Shortly after high school, she won the 1992 Coca-Cola Youth Bowling Championships in the Girls' Scratch division.

Johnson then bowled at Morehead State University, earning both Rookie of the Year and Collegiate Bowler of the Year honors in 1993, but stayed in college only one year, as she was determined to make bowling her career. She claims that bowling is the only job she's ever had. She worked in her local bowling center early on, and has held various pro shop and pro staff positions in addition to earning a living on the lanes.

In 2018, she married her girlfriend Kasia Kaufman. She has resided in Palatine, Illinois, and now lives in Niagara Falls, New York.

== PWBA career (1995–2003) ==
Johnson qualified for Team USA and joined the PWBA Tour shortly after leaving college. On the pro circuit, she started strong, capturing Rookie of the Year honors and a major tour victory at the U.S. Women's Open in 1996. She won a second PWBA major at the 2001 Hammer PWBA Players Championship.

Another PWBA career highlight came in 2001, shortly after the terrorist attacks in New York City and Washington, D.C. In an emotional event held on September 14 — the first professional sporting event to resume after the attacks — Johnson bowled the third televised perfect 300 game in PWBA history to defeat Carolyn Dorin-Ballard in the final match of the Paula Carter Classic.

== Competing in the PBA ==
Johnson in June 2024

Not to be denied the opportunity to bowl in professional competition, Johnson became a member of the Professional Bowlers Association (PBA) — generally regarded as the "men's tour" — in 2004.

Early in the 2004–05 season, she made history by becoming the first woman to qualify for a standard PBA tour event, making the Round of 64 at the 2004 Uniroyal Tire Classic. Later that season, she raised the bar even higher by becoming the first woman to make the televised finals of a PBA event (2005 Banquet Open). In this event, she also became the first woman to ever defeat a man in a PBA Tour broadcast, winning her semifinal match over Wes Malott by a score of 235–228. She was unable to complete the quest for a title, falling 219–192 to eventual PBA Player of the Year Tommy Jones in the final match.

Johnson posted another "first" in the summer of 2005 — becoming the first woman to win a PBA event, as she captured the title in a PBA Regional Tour stop (2005 East Region Kingpin Lanes Open). To win that tournament, she had to defeat four-time PBA titlist Ryan Shafer in the semifinal, and PBA tour veteran Mike Fagan in the finals.

On November 18, 2017, Johnson won the PBA Chameleon Championship at the 2017 World Series of Bowling in Reno, Nevada, her first win on the national PBA Tour and the second victory ever recorded by a female on the Tour, following Kelly Kulick in 2010. Johnson is also the third woman to defeat a man in a televised bowling championship match. Lynda Barnes was the first woman to do so by defeating Sean Rash in the 2008 USBC Clash of Champions, but this event was not part of the PBA Tour. Kulick became the second woman to defeat a man in a televised title bowling match, but the first to do so in a PBA Tour event, that being the 2010 PBA Tournament of Champions invitational. Johnson became the first woman to win an open, non-major PBA Tour title.

== Major Wins and PBA Women's Series (2004–14) ==
Johnson won the 2007 U.S. Women's Open over close friend and tour roommate Shannon O'Keefe at the National Bowling Stadium in Reno, Nevada. The event returned in 2007 from a three-year hiatus when its rights were acquired by the United States Bowling Congress (USBC). Johnson also won the 2007 PBA Ladies and Legends tournament (with partner Roger Kossert), which was part of that season's PBA Senior Tour.

Johnson's first PBA Women's Series title came in the Don and Paula Carter Mixed Doubles event, where she partnered with Norm Duke for the victory on January 6, 2009. In the Baker Doubles format, Johnson threw five of the ten frames in the final match, and had a strike in every frame. She won her first and only singles title in the PBA Women's Series on September 5, 2009, at the PBA Viper Championship. The PBA Women's Series would only last for three seasons, ending in April 2010, again leaving Johnson and other female professionals without a national tour.

Johnson won another major title at the 2009 USBC Queens tournament, which was not part of the PBA Women's Series, at the National Bowling Stadium in Reno, Nevada.

Johnson qualified as the top seed in the May 2010 U.S. Women's Open, but lost in the final match to Kelly Kulick. She avenged her loss in the 2013 U.S. Women's Open, with a convincing 257–195 win over Kulick in the final match to earn her third U.S. Open crown.

With the victory, Johnson joined Marion Ladewig and Kulick as the only players to win the U.S. Women's Open at least three times. Following the 2013 event, Johnson cashed an additional $10,000 by winning the "Battle of the Sexes" over men's U.S. Open champion Wes Malott, whom she had previously beaten on television in 2005.

The PWBA has since credited Johnson's three major championships during the PWBA Tour's hiatus as PWBA titles, giving her 14 PWBA titles through the 2013 U.S. Women's Open victory.

Johnson was part of Team USA in 2011. At the WTBA World Women's Championships in Hong Kong, this team took home gold for the United States in the team event for the first time since 1987. In 2014, the National Polish-American Sports Hall of Fame awarded its NPASHF Excellence in Sports Award to Liz Johnson.

== PWBA Tour rebirth (2015–present) ==
=== 2015 season ===
Johnson won a major title at the 2015 USBC Queens tournament, the opening event of the rebooted PWBA Tour, at the Ashwaubenon Bowling Alley in Green Bay, WI. She entered the May 19 stepladder format finals as the number two seed. After eliminating 2006 Queens champion Shannon Pluhowsky in the semifinals, she then defeated top seed Erin McCarthy in the final match to win the title, the $20,000 top prize and the coveted tiara. It was Johnson's second USBC Queens title and sixth career major championship.

Johnson continued her dominance in 2015, winning her fourth U.S. Women's Open on September 6, 2015. As in her 2007 U.S. Women's Open win, Johnson defeated Shannon O'Keefe in the final match to take the $50,000 top prize. Johnson became one of only two women to have won the U.S. Women's Open at least four times (with Marion Ladewig being the other). She is also the first player to successfully defend a U.S. Women's Open title since Dottie Fothergill in 1968–69. Liz was named PWBA Player of the Year for 2015.

At the December 2015 World Women's Championship (WWC) in Abu Dhabi, Johnson bowled 300 as the anchor bowler in the team event finals, as Team USA won the gold medal in the WWC team(-of-five) competition. She received the individual silver medal in the All-Events total score (5586), one pin behind the gold medal recipient (5587).

=== 2016 season ===
On the 2016 PWBA Tour, Johnson won the PWBA Las Vegas Open on May 26.

On August 7, 2016, Johnson won her fifth career U.S. Women's Open and her third consecutive title in this event. Only Marion Ladewig, who captured the first five U.S. Women's Open tournaments ever held (1949–54), has won more consecutive Opens.

Johnson won her second consecutive PWBA Player of the Year award in 2016, leading the Tour in points and earnings, while tying for the lead in championship round appearances and winning two titles (one major).

=== 2017 season ===
Johnson captured her first title of the 2017 PWBA season, her 20th PWBA title overall, on May 23 at the PWBA Storm Sacramento Open.

Johnson continued her 2017 success by winning a major championship at the GoBowling.com PWBA Players Championship on June 25. This was her 21st PWBA Tour title and ninth major title.

On August 6, 2017, Johnson continued her dominance in the U.S. Women's Open, running her streak to four consecutive wins in this tournament. With the victory, Johnson now holds the all-time women's record with ten major championships (six of which were earned at the U.S. Women's Open). Daria Pająk of Poland, Johnson's opponent in the final match of the 2017 Open, proclaimed Liz to be "the best bowler in the world" following the match.

Having won three tournaments in 2017, including two majors, Johnson easily won her third consecutive PWBA Player of the Year award. In addition to tournament wins, Johnson led the 2017 PWBA Tour in earnings, points, match play appearances and championship round appearances. She made the televised finals in all four majors, and tied Player of the Year runner-up Kelly Kulick by cashing in 13 tournaments.

=== 2018 season ===
Johnson won her 23rd PWBA title on July 29, 2018, at the Storm PBA/PWBA Striking Against Breast Cancer Mixed Doubles championship. She teamed with PBA professional E. J. Tackett in this annual event held in Houston, Texas. Johnson received praise from her partner for her bold move to play the extreme outside angle on one lane and an inside line on the other. Said Tackett: "There was not a single person in this building who could have done what she did in that last game. It was absolutely amazing watching her play outside on one lane, inside on the other. There are only two people in the world who can do what Liz did – her and Norm Duke. That's one reason she is the greatest woman bowler of all-time." Johnson won her 24th PWBA title and second of the 2018 season on August 18 at the PWBA Columbus Open.

=== 2019 season ===
On January 6, 2019, Johnson won the World Bowling Tour Women's Finals, a non-title event in which the finalists are based on performance in global events throughout the previous season. This was Johnson's first ever win in the event, having made the finals five previous times without winning. Since the rebirth of the PWBA Tour in 2015, this marks the first season in which Johnson did not win a title.

=== 2021 season ===
The 2020 PWBA Tour season was cancelled due to the COVID-19 pandemic.

On May 1, 2021, Johnson won her 25th PWBA title and 29th professional title overall in the PWBA Lincoln Open. She rolled a 300 game in the semifinal match, earning a $10,000 bonus in addition to the $10,000 first place prize. Johnson is the only female bowler to have multiple televised 300 games in PWBA title events, having rolled her first in 2001. Johnson led the 2021 PWBA Tour with 18 cashes in 20 events.

== PBA50 Tour/USBC Senior events ==
In 2024, Johnson joined the PBA50 Tour, the PBA's tour for players age 50 and over. In her very first tournament, the PBA50 Bud Moore Players Championship on July 15–19 of that year, she became the first woman to make the championship finals of a PBA50 Tour event, finishing fourth.

On April 13, 2025, Johnson won the USBC Senior Queens in her tournament debut, defeating Rina Sabo in the title match. Johnson is only the third bowler, after Sandra Postma and Anne Marie Duggan, to win both the USBC Queens and USBC Senior Queens. Johnson repeated as USBC Senior Queens champion in 2026, with a two-game sweep in the final match over Lynda Barnes, 277–258 and 255–244. She is the first repeat winner in the event since Robin Romeo earned a threepeat from 2014 to 2016.

On June 25, 2026, Johnson added to her list of historic firsts, winning the PBA50 South Shore Classic to become the first woman to earn a PBA50 Tour title. As the top seed, she defeated five-time PBA50 titlist Brian LeClair in her lone championship match.

== Style ==
Johnson's bowling style is considered to be mechanically sound and consistent, not flashy. A 2005 bowling.com article stated, "If you were to compare Major League Baseball superstar Roger Clemens and his 95 mile-per-hour fastball to Tommy Jones' mega-hook power game in bowling, you could compare Johnson's game to another 300-game winner: Chicago Cubs pitcher Greg Maddux, who throws an 85 mph fastball but almost never walks enemy batters because of his pin-point accuracy."

== Professional Championships ==
Johnson has won a total of 32 professional titles, including ten major championships, broken down as follows:

- 15 PWBA Tour standard titles
- 10 PWBA major titles (7 earned on the PWBA Tour, 3 earned during the Tour's 2004 through 2014 hiatus)
- 2 PBA Women's Series titles
- 1 PBA Legends & Ladies title (w/partner Roger Kossert; 2007 PBA Senior Tour event)
- 1 PBA Tour title
- 1 PBA50 Tour title
- 2 USBC Senior titles

=== PWBA Tour titles ===
Major championships are in bold text.

1. 1996 Ladies & Legends Doubles (w/Mike Kench)
2. **1996 U.S. Women's Open**
3. 1997 Texas Border Shoot-Out
4. 1997 Music City Country Classic
5. 1997 Summer Motion Blue Ribbon Classic
6. 1999 Greater Orlando Open
7. 2001 St. Clair Classic
8. 2001 Foundation Games V
9. 2001 Paula Carter Classic
10. **2001 Hammer Players Championship**
11. 2002 Lady Ebonite Classic
12. **2007 U.S. Women's Open (2)**
13. **2009 USBC Queens**
14. **2013 U.S. Women's Open (3)**
15. **2015 USBC Queens (2)**
16. 2015 Greater Detroit Open
17. **2015 U.S. Women's Open (4)**
18. 2016 Las Vegas Open
19. **2016 U.S. Women's Open (5)**
20. 2017 Storm Sacramento Open
21. **2017 Go Bowling! PWBA Players Championship (2)**
22. **2017 U.S. Women's Open (6)**
23. 2018 Storm Striking Against Breast Cancer Mixed Doubles (w/E.J. Tackett)
24. 2018 Nationwide Columbus Open
25. 2021 Lincoln Open

(Source: 11thframe.com)

=== PBA Women's Series titles ===
1. 2009 Don & Paula Carter Mixed Doubles w/Norm Duke
2. 2009 PBA Women's Series Viper Championship

=== PBA Tour titles ===
1. 2017 PBA WSOB IX Chameleon Championship

=== Senior titles ===
1. 2025 USBC Senior Queens
2. 2026 USBC Senior Queens
3. 2026 PBA50 South Shore Classic

== Awards and recognition ==
- 1992 Girls Scratch Champion, Coca-Cola Youth Bowling Championships
- 1993 Collegiate Rookie of the Year and Collegiate Bowler of the Year
- U.S. Amateur Champion in back-to-back years (1993–94)
- 11-time member of Team USA (1994–96, 2008–15); part of the 1994 Team USA which won the gold medal at the World Tenpin Team Cup in Malaysia
- 1996 PWBA Rookie of the Year
- Two-time USBC National Women's All-Events champion (1998, 2008)
- USBC National Women's Doubles champion, with partner Susan Jeziorski-Smith (2007)
- Six-time U.S. Women's Open champion (1996, 2007, 2013, 2015, 2016, 2017), the most of any player in the PWBA era (since 1960) and second only to Marion Ladewig (8) for the most all-time
- Two-time USBC Queens Champion (2009, 2015)
- Named "Female Bowler of the Year" in 2005, 2007 and 2009 by the Bowling Writers Association of America.
- Named "Female Bowler of the Decade" (2000–2009) in the Winter, 2010 issue of U.S. Bowler.
- 2014 "Excellence in Sports" Award recipient from the National Polish-American Sports Hall of Fame.
- Inducted into the USBC Hall of Fame on April 29, 2015.
- Three-time PWBA Player of the Year (2015, 2016, 2017)
- Holds the all-time record for women's major championships (10)
- One of two women (with Kelly Kulick) to have won a title on the national PBA Tour.
- Only bowler with multiple televised 300 games in PWBA title events (2001, 2021)
- Inducted into the PWBA Hall of Fame in 2025.

=== Historic firsts ===
- First woman to qualify for a PBA Tour event (2004 Uniroyal Tire Classic)
- First woman to win a PBA Regional Tour event (2005 East Region Kingpin Lanes Open)
- First woman to appear in the televised championship round of a PBA Tour event (2005 Banquet Open)
- First woman to defeat a man in the championship round of a PBA Tour event (defeated Wes Malott in the semifinals of the 2005 Banquet Open)
- First player to reach ten career PWBA major titles (at the 2017 U.S. Women's Open)
- First woman to win an open, non-major PBA Tour title (2017 PBA Chameleon Championship)
- First player with multiple televised 300 games in PWBA Tour events (2001, 2021).
- First woman to make the championship round of a PBA50 Tour event (2024 PBA50 Bud Moore Players Championship)
- First woman to win a PBA50 Tour title (2026 PBA50 South Shore Classic)
