= LaVerne Carter =

American ten-pin bowler

- Born: Laverne Thompson; July 30, 1925; Brentwood, Missouri, U.S.
- Died: March 8, 2012 (aged 86); Florida, U.S.
- Occupation: professional bowler
- Spouse(s): Bill Haverly, Don Carter (1953-1964)
- Children: daughter Cayce (1950), son Jim (1954)

LaVerne Carter (née Thompson; July 30, 1925 – March 8, 2012) was an American professional bowler.

== Career ==
Born in Brentwood, Missouri as Laverne Thompson, Carter moved to Tucson as a teenager, and ultimately to Los Angeles, where she acquired the nickname "The Blonde Bombshell" for her beauty and feisty antics on the lanes. In 1947, she began hosting an instructional and exhibition series known as "Bowl with Laverne", which was hosted by various bowling centers across the United States over the next seven years.

Carter won several singles, doubles, and team tournaments between 1951 and 1974 for the various bowling organizations that existed then. Along with then-husband Don Carter, she was one of the founding members of the Professional Bowlers Association (PBA) in 1958, for which she was given the informal title of "The First Lady of the PBA", and she was one of the founding members of the Professional Women's Bowling Association (PWBA) in 1960.

== Awards ==
The Bowling Writers Association of America named her Bowler of the Year in 1964. In that same year, she was named to the Women's All-American Team by Bowlers Journal. Carter was elected to the United States Bowling Congress (USBC) Hall of Fame in 1977 and the PWBA Hall of Fame in 1995.

== Personal life ==
Carter was married twice. The first was to Bill Haverly, by whom she had a daughter, Cayce (1950). Her second marriage was to bowler Don Carter, from 1953-64, by whom she had a son, Jim (1954). After her divorce in 1964, she moved to Las Vegas, where she lived until she moved to Florida in 2005.

Carter died of cardiac failure on March 8, 2012, two months after her former husband Don Carter.
