= Lisa Wagner =

American bowler (born 1961)

Lisa Wagner (born May 19, 1961) is a retired professional ten-pin bowler who competed on the Professional Women's Bowling Association (PWBA) Tour from 1980 through 2001. She is the all-time leader in officially recognized PWBA titles with 32. Among these titles are major championships at the 1988 U.S. Women's Open and 1996 WIBC Queens. Wagner is a member of the PWBA Hall of Fame (inducted in 1996) and the United States Bowling Congress (USBC) Hall of Fame (inducted in 2000).

== Professional career ==
Wagner, a right-handed bowler, began her professional career as an 18-year old in 1980. While she didn't win any tournaments that season, she finished runner-up three times and was honored with the 1980 Rookie of the Year award. After two more second-place finishes in 1981 and 1982, Wagner's first title came on her 22nd birthday (May 19, 1983) at the Robby's Midwest Classic in Rockford, Illinois. She then won her second title the very next week at the Greater Milwaukee Open. Wagner would string together eight consecutive seasons (1983 to 1990) with at least two titles per year, winning the Female Bowler of the Year award in 1983, 1986 and 1988. She won six titles in the 1988 season alone, including her first major championship at the Seagram's Coolers U.S. Women's Open. She also became the first female professional to cash over $100,000 in tournament earnings during a single season. She was named Female Bowler of the Decade (1980s) by both Bowling Magazine and Woman Bowler magazine.

After reaching 25 tour victories in 1990, Wagner won only five titles between 1991 and 1998, but the 1993 season saw her win her fourth PWBA Player of the Year award. In the 1996 season, she captured her second major title at the WIBC Queens (later named USBC Queens). Oddly, it was the only time in her storied career that Wagner made the final round of a WIBC Queens event, and she had to climb the stepladder from the #5 position to win, ultimately defeating Tammy Turner in the final match, 231–226. She won her final two titles in the 1999 season, and retired following the 2001 season.

Wagner is recognized as the all-time leader in PWBA Tour titles with 32. Lisa made the final match of a PWBA tournament 57 times, going 32–25 in those matches.

Wagner was also a five-time titlist in WIBC Open Championships, which included an all-events title in 1988, a singles title in 2001, and doubles titles in 1982, 1992 and 2001.

== Professional titles ==
Major championships are in bold text. (Source: 11thframe.com)

1. 1983 Robby's Midwest Classic
2. 1983 Greater Milwaukee Open
3. 1983 Hush Puppies Classic
4. 1984 Roto Grip Classic
5. 1984 Joliet Classic
6. 1984 Fairhaven Classic
7. 1984 Alpha Bowl Classic
8. 1985 Fort Pierce Classic
9. 1985 Jackson Classic
10. 1986 Robby's Gladiator Classic
11. 1986 Central New York State Classic
12. 1986 Northwest Fabrics Classic
13. 1987 Columbia 300 Invitational
14. 1987 Active West Invitational
15. 1987 Circus Circus Championship
16. 1988 Ebonite Thunerbolt Classic
17. **1988 Seagram's Coolers U.S. Women's Open**
18. 1988 Fair Lanes Capitol Classic
19. 1988 Michigan Classic
20. 1988 Fair Lanes Denver Classic
21. 1988 Lady Fair Lanes Open
22. 1989 Lady LaMode Open
23. 1989 AMF Virginia Classic
24. 1990 Yuma Open
25. 1990 Carolina Classic
26. 1991 LPBT National Doubles (w/Carolyn Dorin-Ballard)
27. 1993 Santa Maria Classic
28. 1993 Hammer Midwest Open
29. 1995 Quantum Technologies Old Dominion Open
30. **1996 WIBC Queens**
31. 1999 Omaha Open
32. 1999 Storm Challenge

== Personal ==
Wagner grew up in Bradenton, Florida and resided in Fort Myers, Florida in later years. Following her retirement from the PWBA, she worked in marketing for Bowling Management Associates, an organization that owned five bowling centers in southwest Florida. A self-described animal lover, she became a veterinary assistant in her mid-40s.

While she was still bowling in PWBA events, Wagner would regularly appear as a color commentator for ESPN television coverage of tournaments where she did not make the TV finals. When she retired from Tour competition in 2001, she also decided to end her broadcasting career. She stated at the time, “Because of my past bowling accomplishments, the producer wanted me to do the telecasts, but...I don’t want it. I do not want to travel every week to watch bowling and cover it, because I'd rather be competing.”
