= Women's International Bowling Congress =

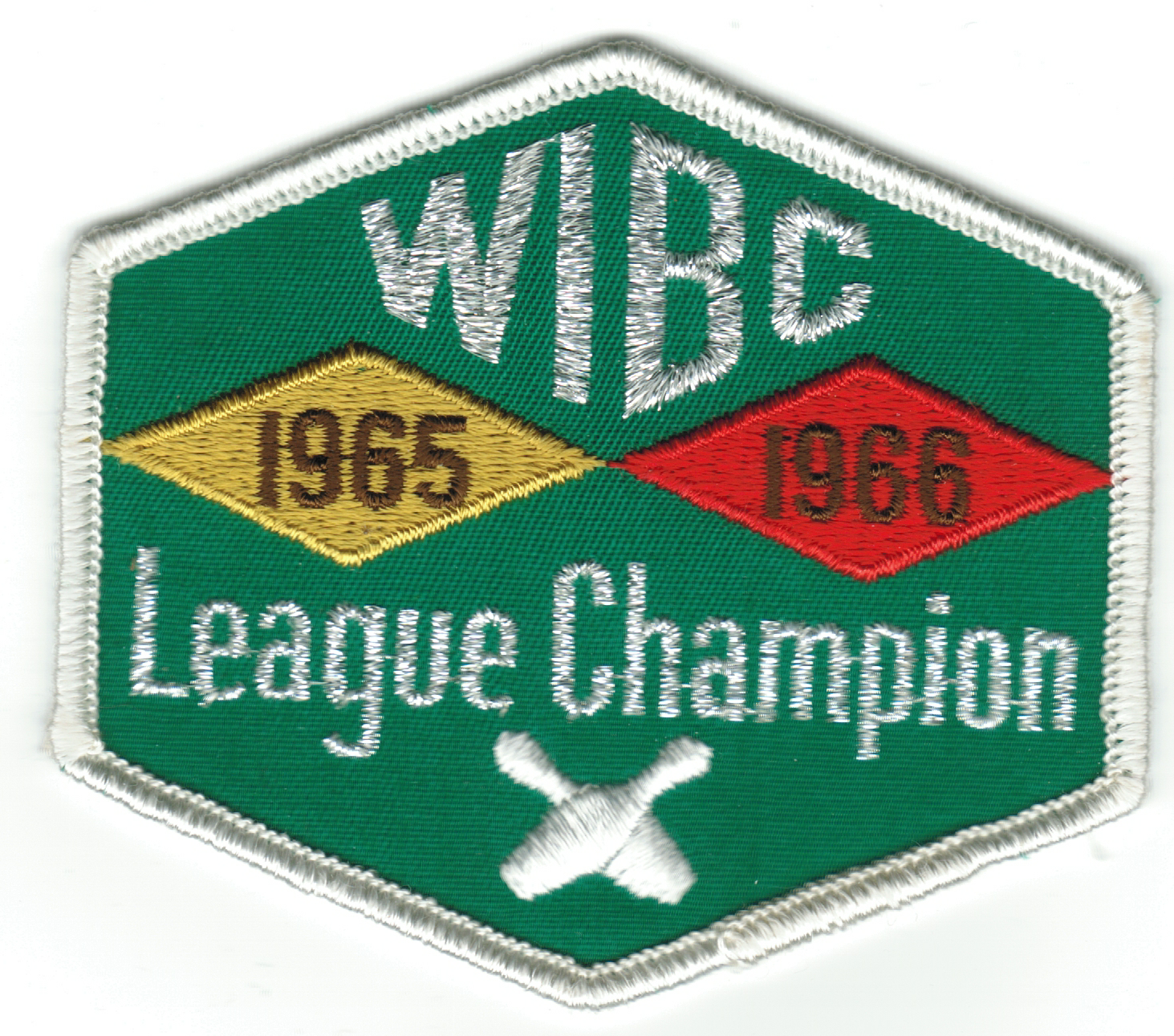
- Abbreviation: WIBC
- Merged into: United States Bowling Congress
- Formation: Late November 1916; 109 years ago
- Founded at: St. Louis, Missouri, USA
- Dissolved: 2005
- Formerly called: Woman's National Bowling Association (WNBA)

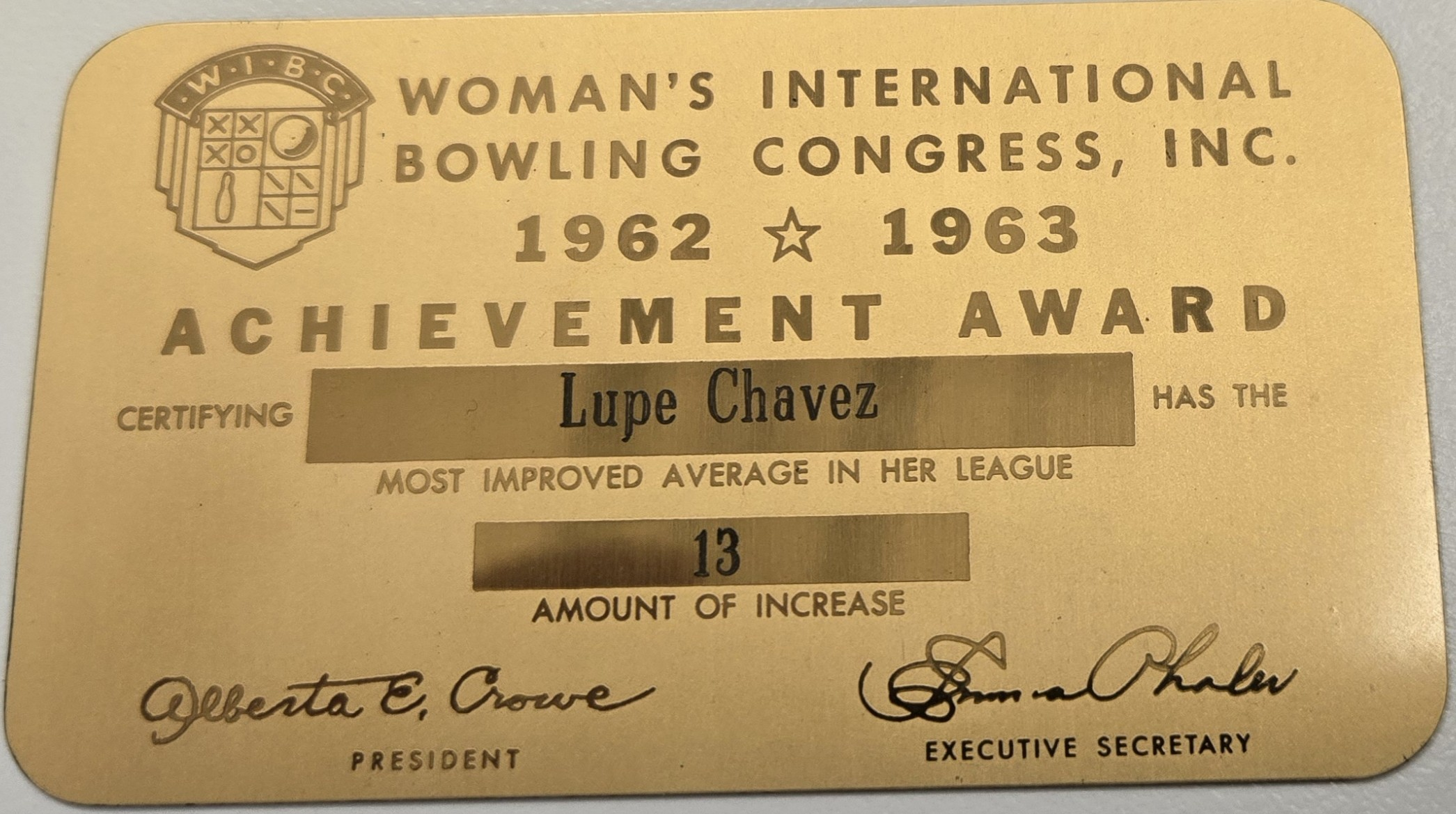
A gold-clad Achievement Award card earned by Lupe Chavez (Maria Guadalupe) for most improved average in her bowling league in McAllen TX. She had an increase of 13 points. She was 19 years old.

The Women's International Bowling Congress (WIBC) was an organization for women bowlers who played ten-pin bowling and was formed in 1916 as a counterpart to the American Bowling Congress (ABC). The WIBC was initially called the "Woman's National Bowling Association" (WNBA), before the Women's International Bowling Congress was formed.

In 2005, the WIBC merged with three other bowling organizations to form the United States Bowling Congress (USBC): the American Bowling Congress, the Young American Bowling Alliance (YABA), and USA Bowling.

== History ==
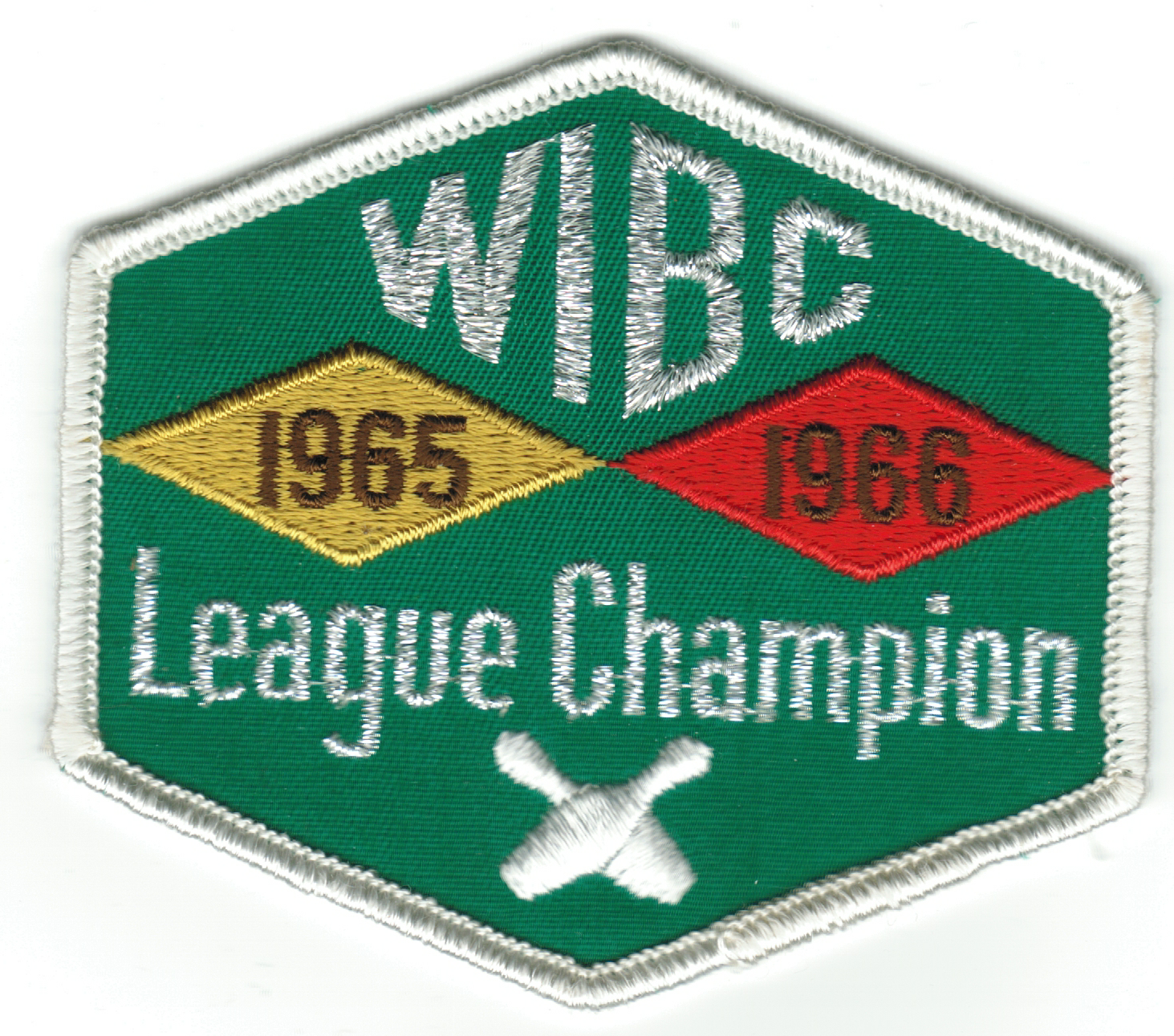
A League Championship emblem received by Olivia C. Reekie in 1966

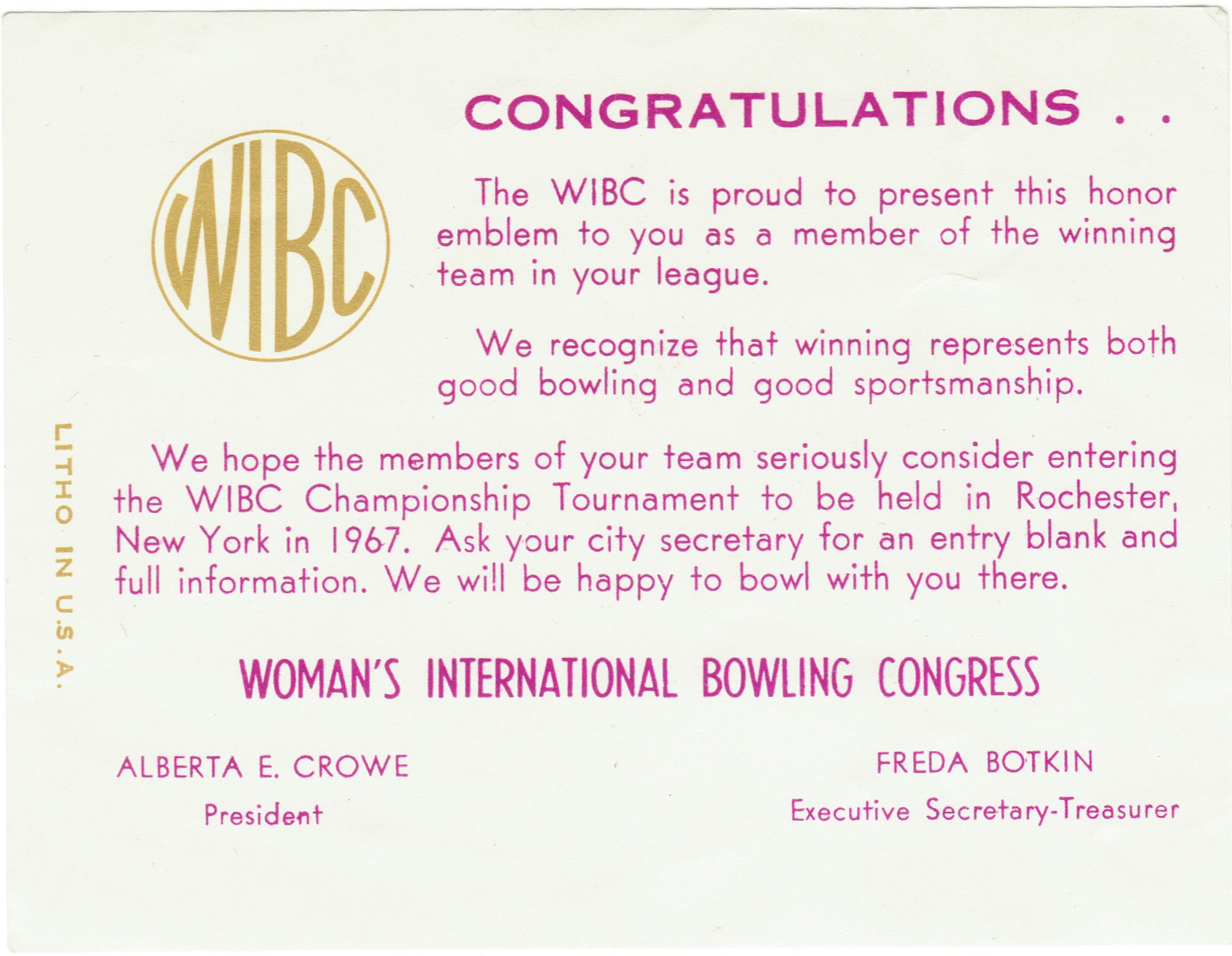
Note included with emblem

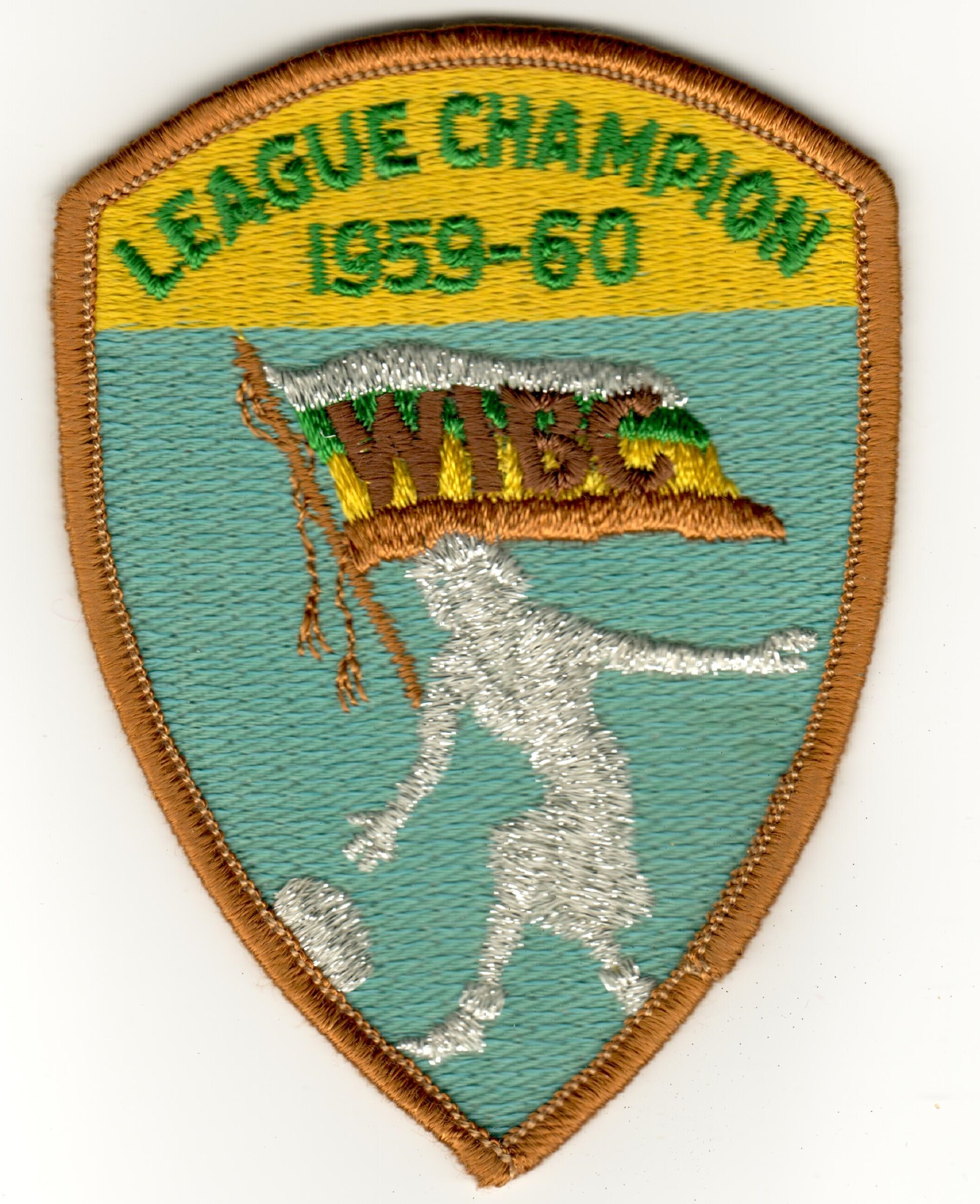
A League Championship emblem received by Florence M. Andrews in 1960

=== Founding of the WIBC ===
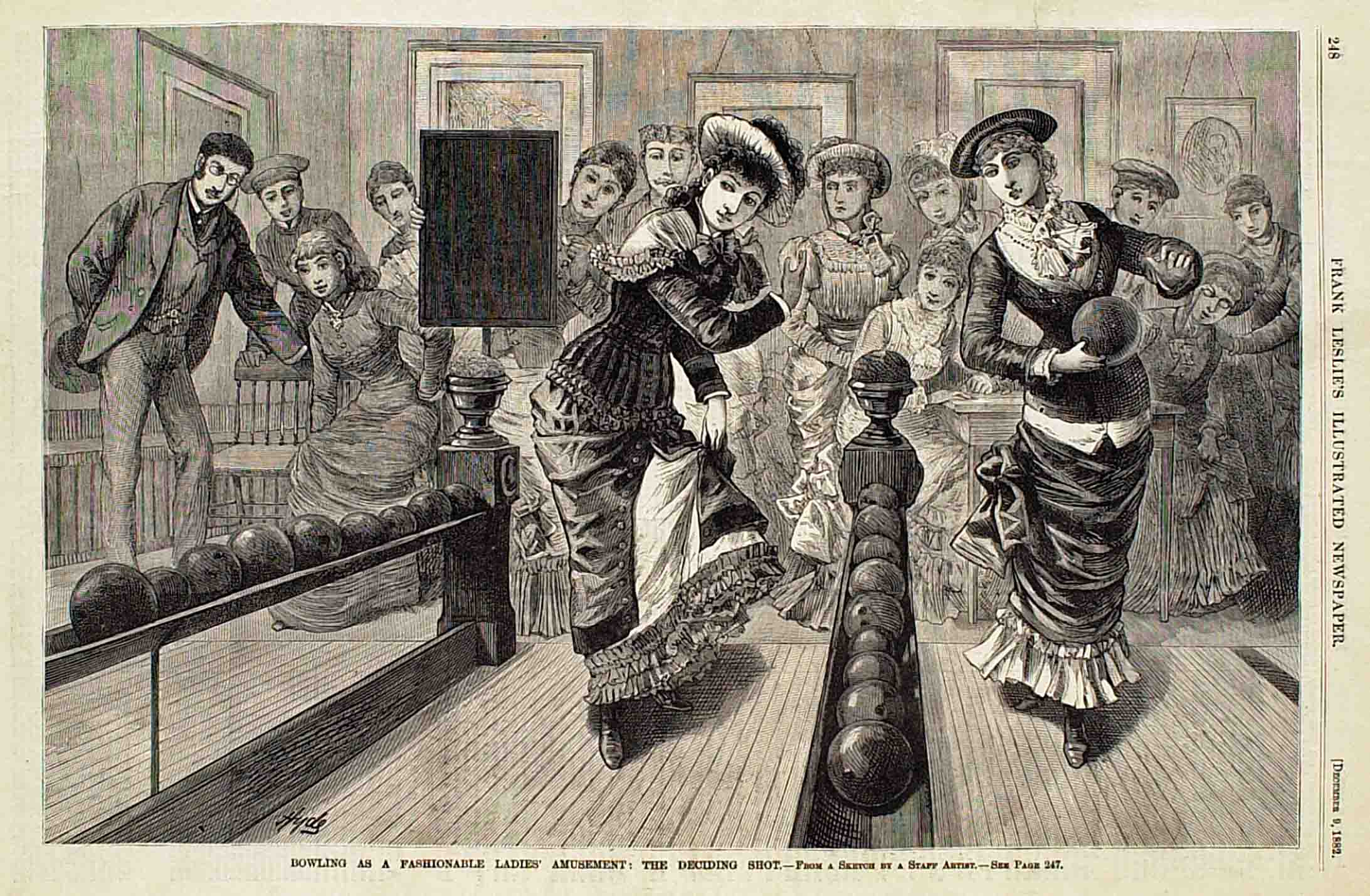
Well before organized women's bowling, the publisher of this 1882 drawing referred to bowling as a "fashionable ladies' amusement".

Originally called the Woman's National Bowling Association (WNBA), the Women's International Bowling Congress was formed in St. Louis, Missouri, in late November 1916. It was the first widely recognized women's association for the sport of ten-pin bowling. The founding women were aided by male bowling alley proprietor (Washington Bowling Alleys in St. Louis) Dennis J. Sweeney, who obtained permission from the American Bowling Congress (ABC) in 1907 to hold a national women's tournament on their lanes, and held one in 1916, providing the inspiration.

The founding members of the WIBC were:

- Catherine Menne, first WIBC president
- Ellen Kelly, first WIBC secretary
- Mrs. L.W. Waldecker, first WIBC treasurer (quickly succeeded in 1917 by Cornelia Berghaus, who was elected after Waldecker resigned)

The first official meeting of the WNBA was held on October 26, 1917, in St. Louis. Forty women from 11 cities attended the meeting and voted on the organization's constitution, bylaws, and first 16-member executive committee. The purpose of the organization was agreed to be:

To provide, adopt and enforce uniform rules and regulations governing the play of American tenpins; to provide and enforce uniform qualifications for tournaments and their participants; to hold a national tournament, and to encourage good feeling and create interest in the bowling game.

The WNBA held its first national tournament—today's USBC Queens event—in Cincinnati, Ohio, on March 11 – 12, 1918.

== Past presidents ==
Catherine Menne, a bowling pioneer, was among the founders, and served as the first president of the Women's National Bowling Association in 1916.

Gladys Banker started in bowling as sergeant-at-arms for the City of Geneva, New York Women's Bowling Association. She taught children how to bowl. She became an officer, then director, and was elected president (1964–1968) of the New York State's Women's Bowling Association. She was also president of the New York State Bowling Council, and a life member of the New York State and Finger Lakes Women's Bowling Associations. She became a member of the New York State Hall of Fame and the Maryland State Hall of Fame. She moved to West Virginia in 1969, and as first vice president, then president, of the Maryland's Women's Bowling Association, as Charles Town, West Virginia did not have a bowling center.

Banker was elected as the sixth president of the WIBC, serving in the top post from July 1, 1988, to July 31, 1993. First appointed to the WIBC board of directors in 1968, she climbed to become fifth vice president in 1976, second vice president in 1981, and first vice president in 1986.

In 1994, Banker died just before she was scheduled to become a member of the National Bowling Hall of Fame. She was instrumental in making the National Bowling Hall of Fame become a reality, by soliciting donations and supporters. She was the director of the National Bowling Hall of Fame for a time.

Banker was the only woman in bowling history to have ever been president of two different state bowling associations and then go on to become the president of the Women's International Congress.

== WIBC Hall of Fame inductees ==
Georgia Veatch served for more than 25 years on the Women's International Bowling Congress's board of directors. She also served as president of the Windy City Women's Bowling Association, and as president and secretary of the Chicago Bowling Council. Veatch was inducted into the Women's International Bowling Congress's Hall of Fame in 1974 for "meritorious service to bowling".

== Membership ==
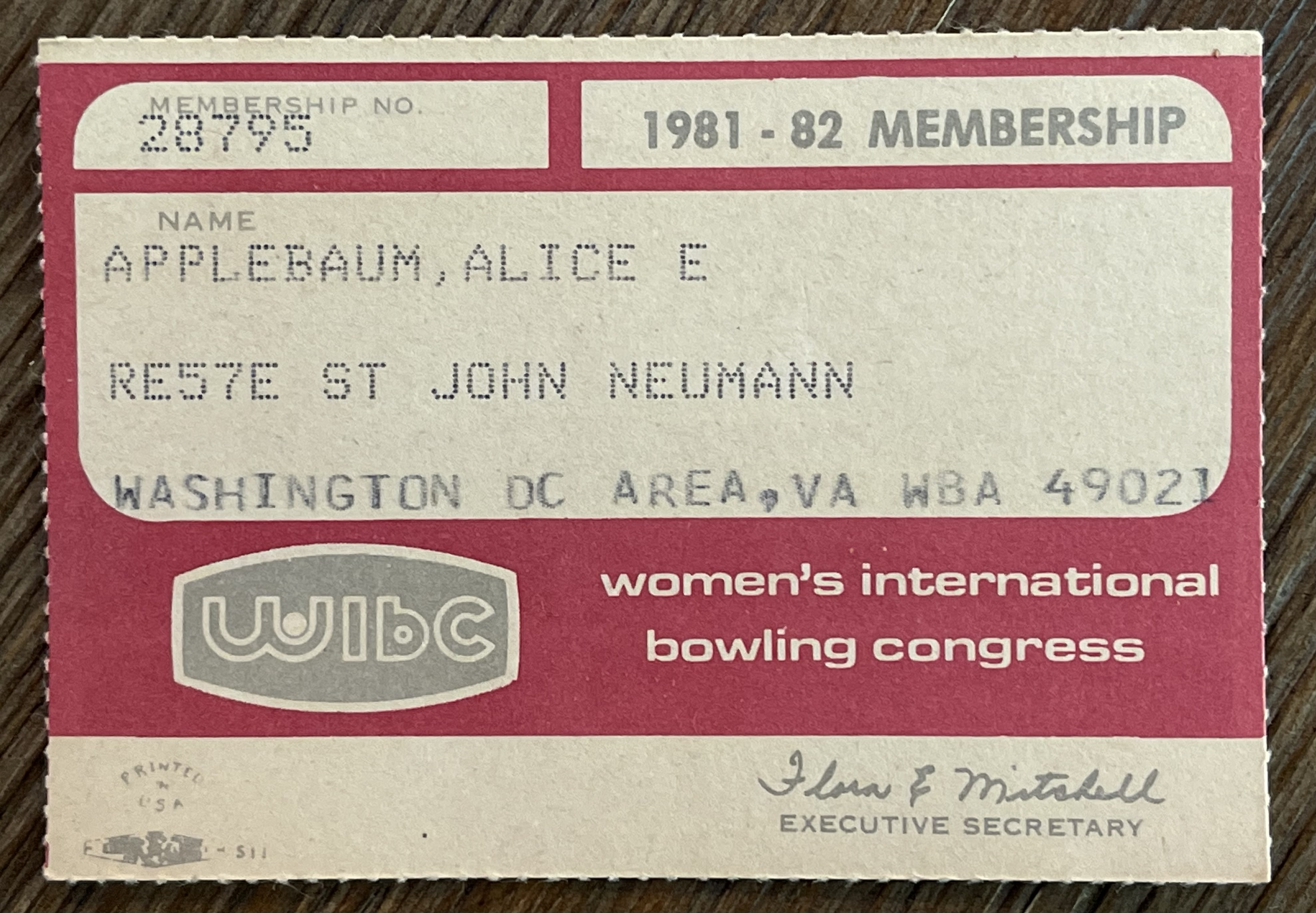
A membership card from 1981 to 1982 for the Woman's International Bowling Congress

When it became a part of USBC in 2005, there were over 1.2 million WIBC members playing in 67,000 sanctioned leagues in over 2,700 local associations. Local associations exist in every U.S. state, as well as some foreign countries.

The national tournament held by the WIBC, now called the USBC Women's Championships, is the largest women's sporting event in the world. The 1997 tournament in Reno, Nevada attracted 14,872 five-woman teams (for a total of 88,279 participants), the largest entry for any team tournament in history and a women's world record.
