= USBC Queens =

The USBC Queens is an annual ten-pin bowling event for amateur and professional female bowlers, sanctioned by the United States Bowling Congress. The event is one of four women's professional majors since the PWBA tour returned in 2015 and the female equivalent of the USBC Masters, now one of the five majors on the Professional Bowlers Association (PBA) Tour.

The format for the USBC Queens tournament is similar to the USBC Masters. All entrants bowl 15 games of qualifying over three days. The top 63 qualifiers plus the previous year's champion are then seeded for match play. (If the previous year's champion qualifies in the top 63, a 64th qualifier is added.) Match play consists of three-game, total-pinfall matches in a double-elimination format. First-time losers during the match play rounds are not eliminated, but are instead placed into an elimination bracket, where they must survive all subsequent three-game matches to have a chance at making the championship finals. The last five remaining players with either one or zero match play losses are seeded for the televised finals, which is a single-game stepladder format.

== USBC Queens history ==
The USBC Queens made its debut in 1961, as a companion to the Women's International Bowling Congress (WIBC) National Tournament. It was known as the WIBC Queens from 1961–2004, until the WIBC became a part of the United States Bowling Congress (USBC) on January 1, 2005. The tournament is part of the World Bowling Tour, annually attracting a field of hundreds of the top bowlers from around the world.

Ten bowlers have won at least two USBC Queens titles, with only two winning three times: Millie Ignizio (Martorella) (1967, 1970, 1971) and Wendy Macpherson (1988, 2000, 2003). Both bowlers are now in the USBC Hall of Fame.

== USBC Queens champions ==
=== 2026 Event ===
The 2026 USBC Queens tournament was held May 13–19 at Gold Coast Bowling Center in Las Vegas. The tournament had 199 total entries and a $324,500 prize fund, with a $60,000 top prize. A five-player stepladder format was used for the live televised finals on May 19. Top seed Erin McCarthy defeated second-seeded Natasha Roslan, 225–204, in the final match to capture her third PWBA Tour title and second major.

Match #1
4	Emma Friant	194
5	New Hui Fen	227

Match #2
3	Josie Barnes	245
5	New Hui Fen	275

Match #3
2	Natasha Roslan	227
5	New Hui Fen	205

Championship Match
1	Erin McCarthy	225
2	Natasha Roslan	204

Final Standings:
1. Erin McCarthy (Elkhorn, Nebraska) – $60,000
2. Natasha Roslan (Malaysia) – $30,000
3. New Hui Fen (Singapore) – $22,500
4. Josie Barnes (Hermitage, Tennessee) – $17,500
5. Emma Friant (France) – $12,500

=== List of champions ===
- 2026: Erin McCarthy
- 2025: Josie Barnes
- 2024: Jillian Martin
- 2023: Lindsay Boomershine
- 2022: Birgit Noreiks
- 2021: Julia Bond
- 2020: Not held due to COVID-19 pandemic
- 2019: Dasha Kovalova
- 2018: Shannon O'Keefe
- 2017: Diana Zavjalova
- 2016: Bernice Lim
- 2015: Liz Johnson
- 2014: Maria Jose Rodriguez
- 2013: Diana Zavjalova
- 2012: Diandra Asbaty
- 2011: Missy Parkin
- 2010: Kelly Kulick
- 2009: Liz Johnson
- 2008: Lynda Barnes
- 2007: Kelly Kulick
- 2006: Shannon Pluhowsky
- 2005: Tennelle Milligan
- 2004: Marianne DiRupo
- 2003: Wendy Macpherson
- 2002: Kim Terrell
- 2001: Carolyn Dorin-Ballard
- 2000: Wendy Macpherson
- 1999: Leanne Barrette
- 1998: Lynda Norry
- 1997: Sandra Jo Shiery-Odom
- 1996: Lisa Wagner
- 1995: Sandy Postma
- 1994: Anne Marie Duggan
- 1993: Jan Schmidt
- 1992: Cindy Coburn-Carroll
- 1991: Dede Davidson
- 1990: Patty Ann
- 1989: Carol Gianotti
- 1988: Wendy Macpherson (largest-ever women's-only sporting event in history, some 88,000 participants)
- 1987: Cathy Almeida
- 1986: Cora Fiebig
- 1985: Aleta Sill
- 1984: Kazue Inahashi
- 1983: Aleta Rzepecki
- 1982: Katsuko Sugimoto
- 1981: Katsuko Sugimoto
- 1980: Donna Adamek
- 1979: Donna Adamek
- 1978: Loa Boxberger
- 1977: Dana Stewart
- 1976: Pamela Buckner
- 1975: Cindy Powell
- 1974: Judy Soutar
- 1973: Dorothy Fothergill
- 1972: Dorothy Fothergill
- 1971: Mildred Martorella
- 1970: Mildred Martorella
- 1969: Ann Feigel
- 1968: Phyllis Massey
- 1967: Mildred Martorella
- 1966: Judy Lee
- 1965: Betty Kuczynski
- 1964: D.D. Jacobson
- 1963: Irene Monterosso
- 1962: Dorothy Wilkinson
- 1961: Janet Harman
