= Marion Ladewig =

American ten-pin bowler (1914–2010)

- Born: October 30, 1914; Grand Rapids, Michigan, U.S.
- Died: April 16, 2010 (aged 95); Grand Rapids, Michigan, U.S.
- Occupation: Bowler
- Relatives: LaVonne Vicari (daughter); Janet Zylstra (granddaughter); Jennifer Lee (great-granddaughter); Aaron Lee (great-grandson); Rebecca Prins (great-granddaughter); Katie Bustinza (great-granddaughter); Madison Jordan (great-great granddaughter)

Marion Ladewig (née Van Oosten; October 30, 1914 – April 16, 2010) was an American ten-pin bowler. She was named Female Bowler of the Year by the Bowling Writers Association of America a record nine times between 1950 and 1963 (1950–54, '57–'59, '63). A Grand Rapids, MI native, Ladewig is the only woman to win WIBC City, State, and National All-Events titles in the same year (1951).

In 1964 Ladewig became the first Superior Performance inductee into the Women's International Bowling Congress Hall of Fame, and in 1984 became the first woman bowler inducted into the Women’s Sports Foundation Hall of Fame. She is the all-time leader in U.S. Women's Open championships with eight; the next closest bowler is Liz Johnson with six. Ladewig also won the Women's World Invitational tournament five times (1957, '60, '62, '63 and '64) and the inaugural PWBA Championship in 1960. She retired from competitive bowling at the end of 1964.

She appeared as a guest on What's My Line on January 12, 1964.

After retiring from active competition, Ladewig co-hosted the locally produced WOTV Bowling Classic in Grand Rapids, alongside local sportscaster Warren Reynolds, during the 1970s and 1980s.

In 1983 bowling writer Joe Antczak wrote in tribute to her role in advancing women in bowling:

"(She) is recognized as the world's queen of her game, not only among top women and men bowlers, but to those who have chronicled the game's developments from the days when it was a backroom saloon attraction for men only."

She was inducted into the International Women's Sports Hall of Fame in 1984. In the December 1999 issue of Bowlers Journal International, Ladewig was rated the best woman bowler of the 20th century, #7 overall, with Don Carter as #1.

Ladewig died on April 16, 2010, at the age of 95.
