= United States Bowling Congress =

American sports organization

- Sport: Ten-Pin Bowling
- Jurisdiction: National
- Membership: 1.4 million
- Abbreviation: USBC
- Founded: 2005
- Headquarters: Arlington, Texas, U.S.
- Location: 621 Six Flags Drive
- Director: Chad Murphy
- Replaced: American Bowling Congress, Women's International Bowling Congress, Young American Bowling Alliance, USA Bowling

Official website
- www.bowl.com
- (United States)

The United States Bowling Congress (USBC) is a sports membership organization dedicated to ten-pin bowling in the United States. It was formed in 2005 by a merger of the American Bowling Congress—the original codifier of all tenpin bowling standards, rules, and regulations from 1895 onwards; the Women's International Bowling Congress—founded in 1916, as the female bowlers' counterpart to the then all-male ABC; the Young American Bowling Alliance; and USA Bowling. The USBC's headquarters are located in Arlington, Texas, after having moved from the Milwaukee suburb of Greendale, Wisconsin, in November 2008. The move enabled the USBC to combine its operations with the Bowling Proprietors' Association of America (BPAA).

== Purpose ==
The USBC is the national governing body for ten-pin bowling in the United States. It has approximately 3,000 local associations across the US serving over 2 million members. Among its duties and responsibilities to these members are:

- Maintain specifications, conduct research testing for, and certify: bowling lanes, lane dressings, pin setting and ball return equipment, bowling pins, bowling balls and other bowling-related products.
- Establish and publish playing rules, and provide counselors to help interpret them.
- Certify leagues and tournaments.
- Protect the financial investment of certified leagues through its league bonding program.
- Manage Team USA as it competes in international tournaments.
- Conduct championship tournaments: USBC Masters, USBC Queens, USBC Open Championships, USBC Women's Championships, USBC Youth Open, USBC Junior Gold Championships, USBC Intercollegiate Team Championships, USBC Intercollegiate Singles Championships, USBC Senior Masters, USBC Senior Queens, Team USA Trials, USBC Senior Championships and Pepsi USBC Youth Championships.
- Provides 'Lifetime Achievement' awards, one award only for achievements (300 games and 800 series for three games, among others) accomplished in USBC-sanctioned leagues or tournaments.
- Maintain historical records of bowler averages for use in USBC-sanctioned leagues and tournaments.
- Certify coaches for both youth and adult bowlers.
- Regulate and promote high school and collegiate bowling.
- Manage SMART (Scholarship Management and Accounting Report for Tenpins), the only youth scholarship fund recognized by the United States Olympic Committee (USOC) and the National Collegiate Athletic Association (NCAA), through a separate corporation.

== History ==
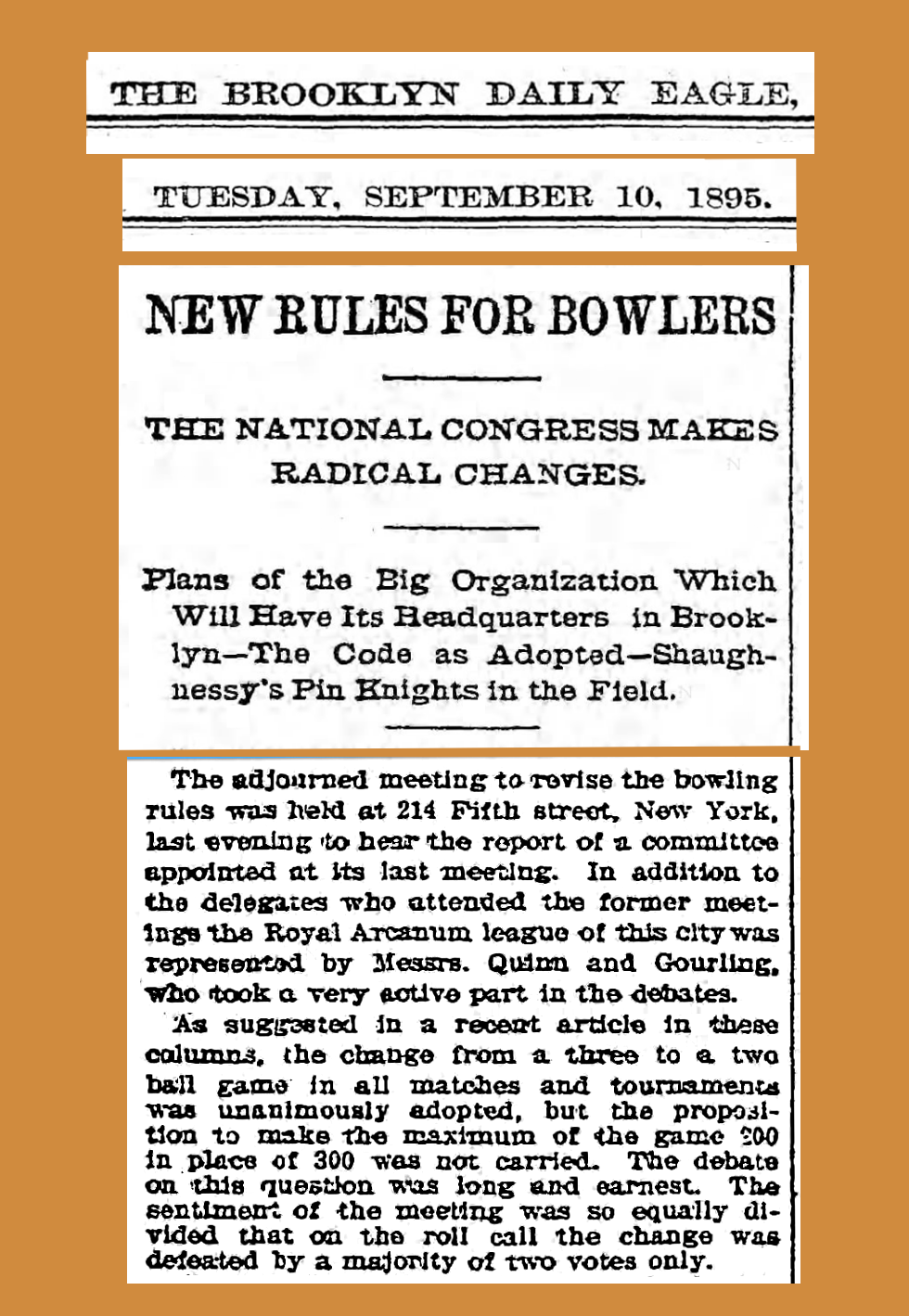
Clipping from a Brooklyn newspaper article, published September 10, 1895, reporting on the first meeting of the American Bowling Congress, noting its unanimous approval of two-roll frames but narrowly defeating a proposal to make the maximum score 200.

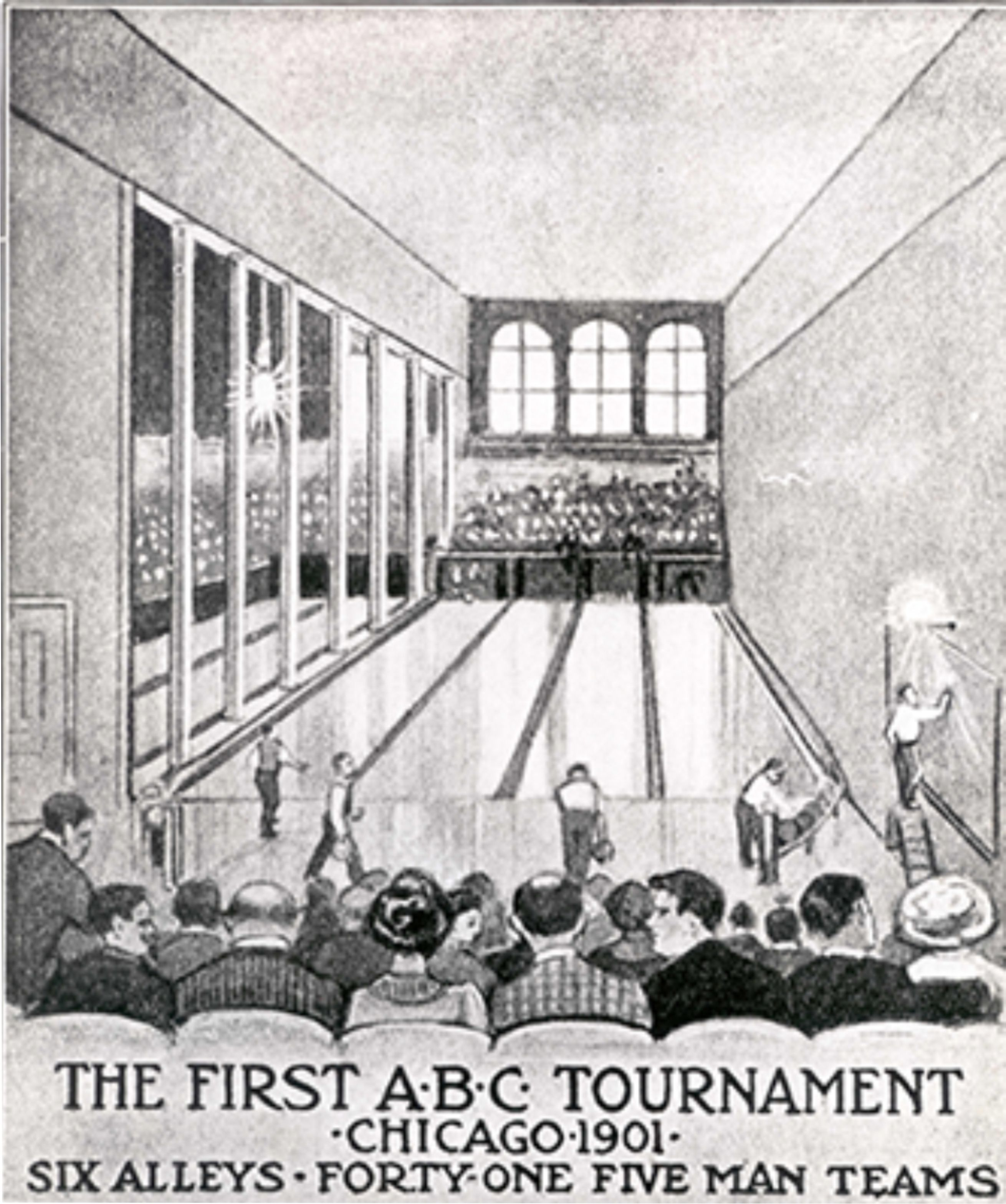
Poster for the first national bowling competition sanctioned by the American Bowling Congress (1901). Highest per-game average scores for individual competition (216), doubles (200), five-man teams (181). A protest was filed against the highest-scoring doubles team, alleging use of a ball that was a quarter-inch larger in circumference than permitted by ABC regulations.

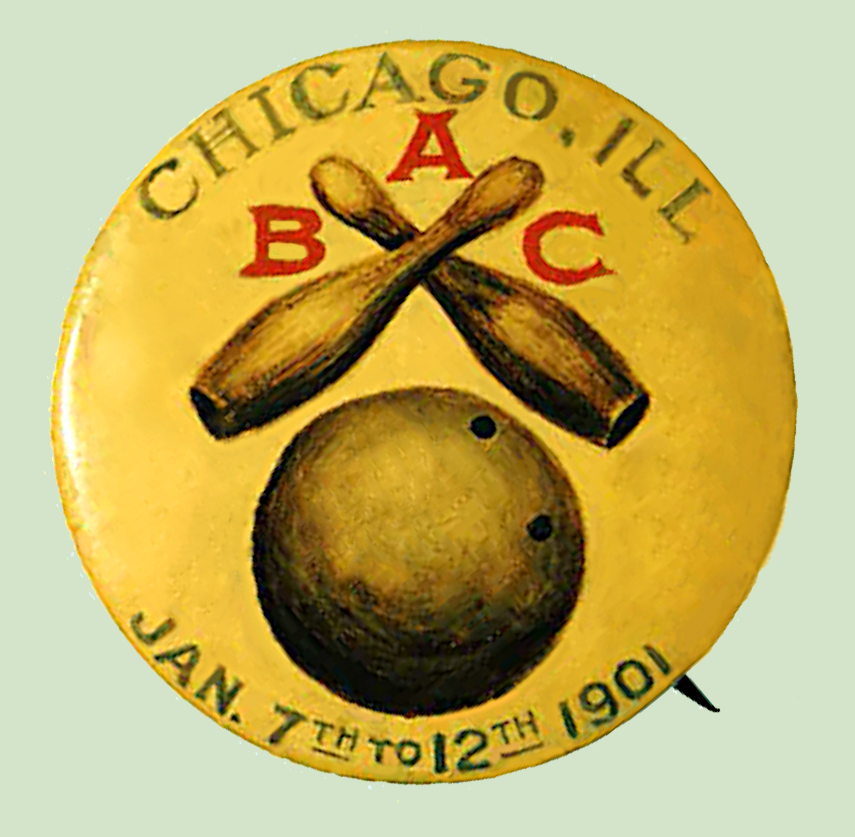
Badge for the first ABC-sanctioned national bowling tournament (1901) showing how bowling balls of the day generally had a thumb hole and only a single finger hole.

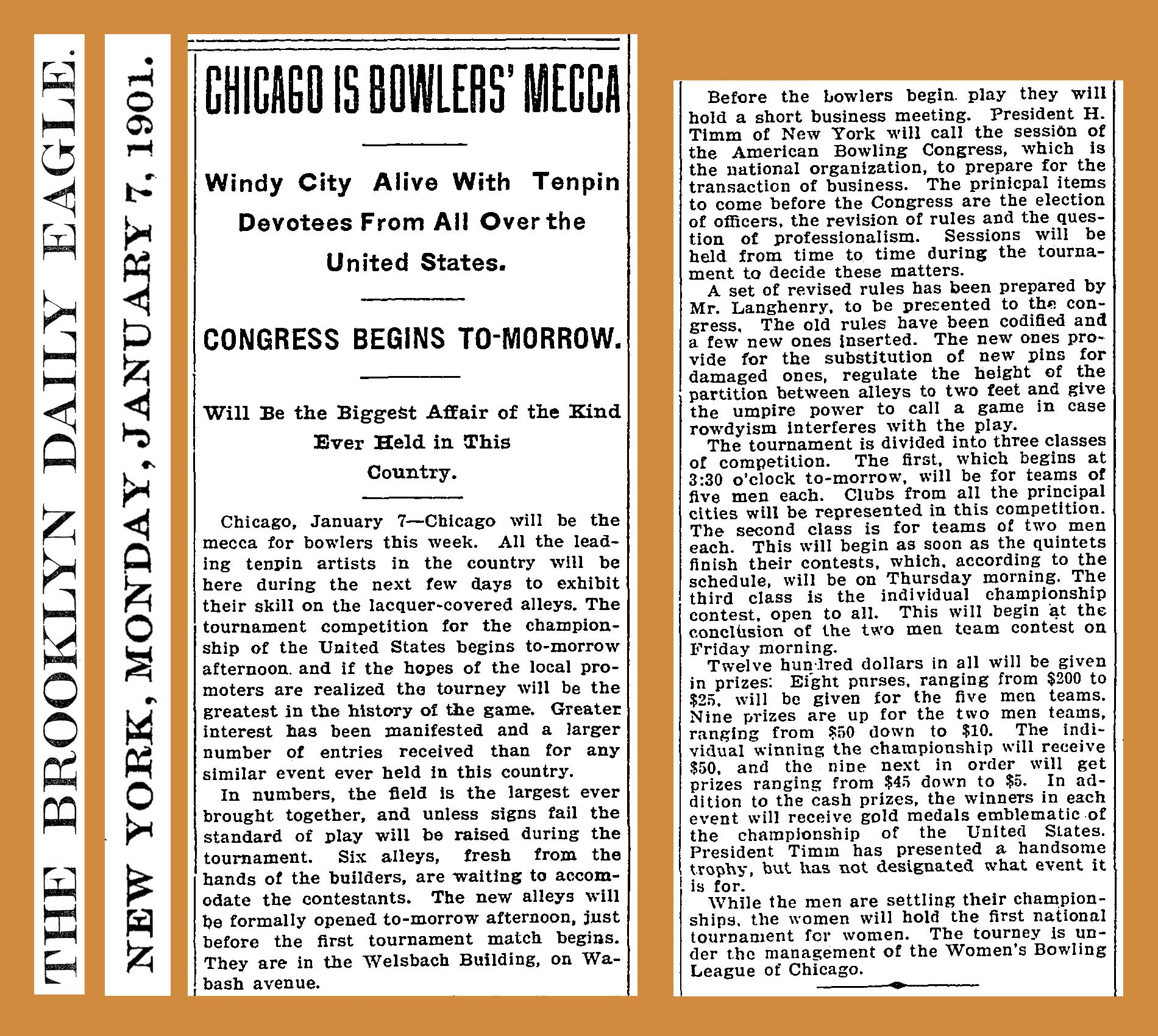
The 1901 tournament, though the largest field ever assembled, had six new lacquer-covered lanes, $1200 in total prizes, and first-prize purses ranging from $50 (individual competition) to $200 (five-man teams).

Historically, the membership of the ABC was all male (white males only in 1916–1950), but beginning in 1993 women were permitted to join. In 1916 the Women's International Bowling Congress (WIBC) was formed by a group of 40 women, and up until 2004 served as a partner organization of the ABC. The Young American Bowling Alliance (YABA) was established in 1982, after previously existing as the American Junior Bowling Congress founded in 1958, to serve youth bowlers from pre-school through collegiate level. Prior to the formation of the USBC, the national governing body for bowling was USA Bowling, which oversaw the participation of Team USA in international events. These four organizations merged to form USBC on January 1, 2005.

== USBC Hall of Fame ==
The USBC Hall of Fame was formed in 2005 by the merger of the ABC Hall of Fame (established 1941) and WIBC Hall of Fame (established 1953).

As of 2022, there are 446 Hall of Fame members in five categories:

- Superior Performance (228)
- Meritorious Service (125)
- Veterans (53)
- Pioneer (22)
- Outstanding USBC Performance (18)*

* Category introduced in 2011, with Jeff Richgels as the inaugural member. Recognizes those who have had noteworthy performances in one of the USBC national tournaments.

The USBC Hall of Fame has its home at the International Bowling Museum on the International Bowling Campus in Arlington, Texas (along with the International Bowling Hall of Fame). The induction ceremony is held annually in the spring.

== USBC in the media ==
The USBC Masters, one of four major tournaments the PBA holds each season, is conducted by the USBC as a part of the PBA Tour. The 2013, 2014 and 2015 events were all won by Australian Jason Belmonte, who became the only player in history to win this tournament in three consecutive years. Belmonte's streak was broken in 2016 by American 19-year-old Anthony Simonsen, who made history as the youngest-ever winner of a PBA major tournament. Belmonte won the 2017 event for an unprecedented fourth Masters title. The most recent champion, crowned on April 2, 2023, is American Anthony Simonsen of Las Vegas, Nevada.

The USBC Queens, one of four major tournaments on the Professional Women's Bowling Association (PWBA) Tour, is conducted by the USBC. The 2019 event was won by Ukrainian-born Dasha Kovalova, who bowled collegiately at Wichita State University.

The USBC Intercollegiate Team Championships (ITC), the national championship of collegiate bowling, is conducted by USBC and has been televised on a tape-delay basis since 2002. For the first time, in 2012, USBC also televised the Intercollegiate Singles Championships as part of a four-week series on CBS Sports Network. Both events were televised in high definition for the first time in 2012.

USBC was the presenting sponsor of the PBA Women's Series for three seasons, beginning with the 2007–08 season. In the 2009–10 season, USBC changed the name of its presenting sponsorship to BOWL.com, the organization's website, which was re-launched on August 3, 2009. USBC did not renew its sponsorship for the 2010–11 season.

In 2007, USBC acquired the rights to the U.S. Women's Open from the Bowling Proprietors' Association of America (BPAA). The event, which had been on a three-year hiatus following the disbanding of the PWBA in 2003, was telecast for five weeks on ESPN in September–October 2007. ESPN again held multi-week broadcasts of the event in 2008, while ESPN2 did the same in 2009. In 2010, USBC reverted to a more traditional format and a one-day stepladder-style TV finals, airing live on ESPN2. That event was held in the Dallas/Fort Worth area, with Kelly Kulick winning. Kulick became the first bowler ever to win the USBC Queens and US Women's Open in the same year. USBC announced in May 2010 that it would not conduct the US Women's Open in 2011, as the BPAA had agreed to resume its association with the tournament. The TV finals took place June 30, 2011, at Cowboys Stadium in Arlington, Texas, where Leanne Hulsenberg was crowned champion.

In May 2008, USBC conducted a special made-for-TV event called "Bowling's Clash of the Champions". The taped telecast was broadcast May 10 and 11 on CBS, marking the first time bowling had been broadcast on regular network television since June 26, 1999. The event featured eight male and eight female bowlers representing youth, college, senior, amateur and professional bowlers who had won recent USBC titles. It was won by Lynda Barnes. The event returned to CBS in 2009, when it was won by Chris Barnes, Lynda's husband.

In 2009, USBC began showing championship competition live free on its website, BOWL.com. In 2011, USBC moved this coverage to its YouTube channel, YouTube.com/BowlTV. BowlTV's coverage was primarily anchored by Lucas Wiseman before he left the organization in December 2015.

In 2018 controversy emerged over Executive Director Chad Murphy for bullying employees and committee members and manipulating the board nominating committee.

== USBC rule changes ==
USBC rule changes occur at the national convention, and take effect for leagues starting after August 1 of each year. Rule changes are published in a new printed guide every two years. Updated rulebooks are available online at bowl.com.

== SMART program ==
The SMART program (Scholarship Management and Accounting Report for Tenpins) was established in 1994 in order to manage and store bowling scholarships until the youth bowler requests the use of the scholarships for college. The bowling scholarships can be from winning tournaments to filling out scholarship application forms. Recently the validity of the term "scholarship" for the SMART program has been questioned by the MHSAA (Michigan High School Athletic Association). The association questions where the education requirements are in earning the "scholarships". Most bowling scholarships earned are from winning a tournament, and are awarded as a cash prize in the form of a scholarship with no GPA or formal scholarly work necessary to claim the money once in college. This in turn has caused the MHSAA to rule high school athletes "ineligible" due to "accepting cash, checks, or any other form of award over $25 in value." This rule is highly debated and has questionable means of enforcement. To receive such scholarships, the athlete must simply sign into their SMART account and fill out the necessary information whereupon the money is sent directly to the schools, not given to the athlete themselves. There are special circumstances which allow money be sent directly to the athlete.
