= PWBA Bowling Tour: 2024 season =

- League: Professional Women's Bowlers Association
- Sport: Ten-pin bowling
- Duration: May 2 – August 13, 2024

PWBA Tour seasons
- ← 2023 2025 →

While some locations have changed, the 2024 Professional Women's Bowling Association (PWBA) Tour season matched the 2023 season with 12 title events scheduled in eight cities. These include eight standard singles title events, three major title events, and one mixed doubles event. Final rounds of the season's three majors (USBC Queens, U.S. Women's Open and PWBA Tour Championship) are broadcast nationally on CBS Sports Network. All other events are broadcast on BowlTV, the USBC’s YouTube channel.

Two of the Tour stops featured three events each. The PWBA Classic Series – Nashville had two open events, with a third event that started with only the top 24 in qualifying from the previous two events. The PWBA Tour Championship Week also began with two standard, open events. The third event, the PWBA Tour Championship major, had a 24-player starting field composed of all the season’s title winners, plus the top season points-earners among non-winners.

The 2024 season also saw the first-ever mixed trios event, held July 31-August 2 in Jonesboro, Arkansas. The event featured trio teams pairing PBA, PBA50 and PWBA players.

PWBA Bowling Tour: 2025 season

== Tournament summary ==
Below is a list of events for the 2024 PWBA Tour season. Major tournaments are in bold. Career PWBA titles for winners are in parentheses. All winnings are shown in US dollars ($).

Event	Airdate	City	Preliminary rounds	Final round	Winner	Notes
PWBA GoBowling! Twin Cities Open	May 4 BowlTV	Eagan, MN	May 3–4	Live	Shannon Pluhowsky, USA (3)	Open event. Top prize $20,000.
PWBA Bowlers Journal Rockford Open	May 11 BowlTV	Rockford, IL	May 10–11 (PTQ: May 8)	Live	Sin Li Jane, Malaysia (2)	Open event. Top prize $20,000.
**USBC Queens**	May 21 CBS Sports	Green Bay, WI	May 15–20	Live	Jillian Martin, USA (a)	Open event. PWBA major. Top prize $60,000.
PWBA Classic Series – Greater Nashville Classic	May 30 BowlTV	Smyrna, TN	May 29–30	Live	Sin Li Jane, Malaysia (3)	Open event. Top prize $10,000.
PWBA Classic Series – BowlTV Classic	Jun 1 BowlTV	Smyrna, TN	May 31–Jun 1	Live	Cherie Tan Singapore (5)	Open event. Top prize $10,000.
PWBA Classic Series – Music City Classic	Jun 3 BowlTV	Smyrna, TN	Jun 2–3	Live	Shannon Pluhowsky, USA (4)	Top 24 from Greater Nashville Classic and BowlTV Classic qualifying. Top prize $12,000.
PWBA Southern Indiana Open	Jun 8 BowlTV	Clarksville, IN	Jun 7–8	Live	Lauren Russo, USA (1)	Open event. Top prize $20,000.
**U.S. Women's Open**	Jun 18 CBS Sports	Indianapolis, IN	Jun 11–17	Live	Sin Li Jane, Malaysia (4)	Open event. PWBA major. Top prize $60,000.
PBA-PWBA Striking Against Breast Cancer Mixed Doubles	Jul 28 BowlTV	Houston, TX	Jul 25–27	Live	Danielle McEwan, USA (9) & Anthony Simonsen, USA	Open PBA and PWBA title event. Top prize $25,000 (team).
PBA/PBA50/PWBA Jonesboro Trios	Aug 2 BowlTV	Jonesboro, AR	Jul 31–Aug 1	Live	Breanna Clemmer, USA (2); François Lavoie, Canada (PBA); Tom Hess, USA (PBA50)	Open event. Top prize $30,000 (team). Bowlers will bowl two five-game qualifying rounds within their respective tours, cutting to the top 16 players for match play. Qualifying pinfall will be dropped entering round-robin match play. Seeding entering match play will determine the PBA/PBA50/PWBA trios teams. All three top seeds will be paired together, as will the No. 2 seeds and so on. The top five teams will advance to a Baker format stepladder final.
PWBA Greater Detroit Open	Aug 8 BowlTV	Allen Park, MI	Aug 7–8	Live	New Hui Fen, Singapore (2)	Open event. Top prize $10,000.
PWBA Pepsi Open	Aug 10 BowlTV	Allen Park, MI	Aug 9–10	Live	Jillian Martin, USA (a)	Open event. Top prize $10,000.
**PWBA Tour Championship**	Aug 13 CBS Sports	Allen Park, MI	Aug 11–12	Live	Sin Li Jane, Malaysia (5)	24-player starting field includes all 2024 titlists (PWBA members only) plus highest points earners among non-winners. PWBA major. Top prize $50,000.

(a) Competed as an amateur. No PWBA title awarded and does not qualify for PWBA Tour Championship.

== Season awards ==
=== 2024 player awards ===
- PWBA Player of the Year: Sin Li Jane
- PWBA Rookie of the Year: Crystal Elliott

=== 2024 points leaders ===
Source: 1. Sin Li Jane (109,425)
2. Cherie Tan (90,850)
3. Shannon Pluhowsky (89,362.5)

=== 2024 average leaders (minimum 7 events) ===
1. Cherie Tan (218.27)
2. Shannon Pluhowsky (217.83)
3. Jordan Richard (215.59)

=== 2024 cashes ===
T1. Cherie Tan (11)
T1. New Hui Fen (11)
T1. Dasha Kovalova (11)
T1. Crystal Elliott (11)

=== 2024 earnings ===
1. Sin Li Jane ($154,570)
2. Jordan Richard ($61,755)
3. Shannon Pluhowsky ($58,478)
