= PWBA Bowling Tour: 2023 season =

- League: Professional Women's Bowlers Association
- Sport: Ten-pin bowling
- Duration: May 4 – August 15, 2023

PWBA Tour seasons
- ← 2022 2024 →

While some locations have changed, the 2023 Professional Women's Bowling Association (PWBA) Tour season matches the 2022 season with 12 title events scheduled in eight cities. These include eight standard singles title events, three major title events, and one mixed doubles event. Final rounds of the season's three majors (USBC Queens, U.S. Women's Open and PWBA Tour Championship) were all broadcast nationally on CBS Sports Network. All other tournaments were broadcast on BowlTV, the USBC's YouTube channel. The USBC Queens major was held at Sam's Town Bowling Center in Las Vegas, Nevada, the Tour's first stop at this venue since the 2000 season. Another 2023 highlight was the season-opening Stockton Open, which marked the PWBA Tour’s 100th event since its 2015 relaunch.

There were two Classic Series tour stops in 2023: the PWBA Great Lakes Classic Series in Wyoming, Michigan and the PWBA Waterloo Classic Series in Waterloo, Iowa. Classic Series stops feature three title events in the same location. The first two tournaments have fully open fields, while the third tournament starts with only the top 24 players in pinfall from the qualifying rounds of the first two tournaments.

== Season awards ==
=== Player awards ===
- PWBA Player of the Year: Jordan Richard
- PWBA Rookie of the Year: Hope Gramly

=== 2023 points leaders ===
1. Jordan Richard (110,162.5)
2. Diana Zavjalova (94,250)
3. Lindsay Boomershine (81,130.8)

=== 2023 average leaders (minimum 7 events) ===
1. Jordan Richard (219.69)
2. Bryanna Coté (216.04)
3. Shannon Pluhowsky (215.60)

=== 2023 championship round appearances ===
1. Jordan Richard (6)
2. Diana Zavjalova (5)
T3. Dasha Kovalova (4)
T3. Verity Crawley (4)

=== 2023 cashes ===
T1. Jordan Richard (11)
T1. Bryanna Coté (11)
T1. Lindsay Boomershine (11)

=== 2023 earnings ===
1. Maria José Rodriguez ($98,754)
2. Lindsay Boomershine ($93,245)
3. Jordan Richard ($91,365)

== Tournament summary ==
Below is a list of events for the 2023 PWBA Tour season. Major tournaments are in bold. Career PWBA titles for winners are in parentheses. All winnings are shown in US dollars ($).

Event	Airdate	City	Preliminary rounds	Final round	Winner	Notes
PWBA Stockton Open	May 6 BowlTV	Stockton, CA	May 4–5	Live	Cherie Tan, Singapore (4)	Open event. $20,000 top prize.
PWBA Spokane Open	May 13 BowlTV	Spokane, WA	May 11–12	Live	Jordan Richard, USA (3)	Open event. $20,000 top prize.
**USBC Queens**	May 23 CBS Sports	Las Vegas, NV	May 18–22	Live	Lindsay Boomershine, USA (1)	Open event. PWBA major. $60,000 top prize.
PWBA Classic Series – Grand Rapids Classic	Jun 2 BowlTV	Wyoming, MI	Jun 1	Live	Verity Crawley, England (2)	Open event. $10,000 top prize.
PWBA Classic Series – BowlTV Classic	Jun 4 BowlTV	Wyoming, MI	Jun 3	Live	Stephanie Zavala, USA (5)	Open event. $10,000 top prize.
PWBA Classic Series – Great Lakes Classic	Jun 6 BowlTV	Wyoming, MI	Jun 5	Live	Jordan Richard, USA (4)	Top 24 from Grand Rapids Classic and BowlTV Classic qualifying. $12,000 top prize.
PWBA Bowlers Journal Cleveland Open	Jun 10 BowlTV	Parma Heights, OH	Jun 8–9	Live	Jordan Richard, USA (5)	Open event. $20,000 top prize.
**U.S. Women's Open**	Jun 20 CBS Sports	Rochester, NY	Jun 14–19	Live	Bryanna Coté, USA (5)	Open event. PWBA major. $60,000 top prize.
PBA-PWBA Striking Against Breast Cancer Mixed Doubles	Jul 30 BowlTV	Houston, TX	Jul 27–29	Live	Danielle McEwan, USA (8) & Anthony Simonsen, USA	Open PBA and PWBA title event. $25,000 top prize.
PWBA Classic Series – Waterloo Classic	Aug 10 BowlTV	Waterloo, IA	Aug 9	Live	Diana Zavjalova, Latvia (5)	Open event. $10,000 top prize.
PWBA Classic Series – Pepsi Classic	Aug 12 BowlTV	Waterloo, IA	Aug 11	Live	Caitlyn Johnson, USA (n)	Open event. $10,000 top prize.
PWBA Classic Series – **PWBA Tour Championship**	Aug 15 CBS Sports	Waterloo, IA	Aug 13–14	Live	Maria José Rodriguez, Colombia (3)	24-player starting field includes eight 2023 titlists plus 16 highest points earners among non-winners. PWBA major. $50,000 top prize.

n=Won as a non-member. No PWBA title awarded, and was ineligible for PWBA Tour Championship.
