= PWBA Bowling Tour: 2026 season =

- League: Professional Women's Bowlers Association
- Sport: Ten-pin bowling
- Duration: April 30 – August 18, 2026

PWBA Tour seasons
- ← 2025 2027 →

While some locations have changed, the 2026 Professional Women's Bowling Association (PWBA) Tour season matched the 2025 season with 12 title events scheduled in eight cities. These included eight standard singles title events, three major title events, and one mixed doubles event. Final rounds of the season's first two majors (USBC Queens and U.S. Women's Open) were broadcast on national television. All other events were broadcast on BowlTV, the USBC's YouTube channel.

Two of the Tour stops featured three events each. The PWBA Summer Series – Rochester (held in nearby Gates, New York) had three events between May 27 and June 1. The PWBA Tour Championship Week in August began with two standard, open events. The third event, the PWBA Tour Championship major, had a 24-player starting field comprising all the season's title winners, plus the top season points-earners among non-winners.

== Tournament summary ==
Below is a list of events held in 2026 PWBA Tour season. Major tournaments are in bold. Career PWBA titles for winners are in parentheses. All winnings are shown in US dollars ($).

Event	Airdate	City	Preliminary rounds	Final round	Winner	Notes
PWBA Bowlers Journal Rockford Open	May 2 BowlTV	Rockford, IL	Apr 30–May 1	Live	Sin Li Jane, Malaysia (6)	Open event. Top prize $18,000.
PWBA Northern Colorado Open	May 9 BowlTV	Greeley, CO	May 7–8	Live	New Hui Fen, Singapore (6)	Open event. Top prize $18,000.
**USBC Queens**	May 19 CBS Sports	Las Vegas, NV	May 14–18	Live	Erin McCarthy, USA (3)	Open event. PWBA major. Top prize $60,000.
PWBA Summer Series – PWBA Rochester Open	May 28 BowlTV	Gates, NY	May 27–28	Live	Stefanie Johnson, USA (6)	Open event. Top prize $10,000.
PWBA Summer Series – PWBA BowlTV Open	May 30 BowlTV	Gates, NY	May 29–30	Live	Shannon Pluhowsky, USA (7)	Open event. Top prize $10,000.
PWBA Summer Series – PWBA Lilac City Open	Jun 1 BowlTV	Gates, NY	May 31–Jun 1	Live	Cherie Tan, Singapore (6)	Open event. Top prize $10,000.
PWBA Barbara Chrisman Classic	Jun 6 BowlTV	Columbus, OH	Jun 4–5	Live	Jordan Snodgrass, USA (7)	Open event. Top prize $20,000.
**U.S. Women's Open**	Jun 16 CBS Sports	Indianapolis, IN	Jun 11–15 (PTQ: Jun 9)	Live	Jillian Martin, USA (4)	Open event. PWBA major. Top prize $60,000.
PBA-PWBA Striking Against Breast Cancer Mixed Doubles	Aug 2 BowlTV	Houston, TX	Jul 30–Aug 1	Live	Annalise OBryant, USA (1) & Spencer Robarge, USA	Open PBA and PWBA title event. Top prize $25,000 (team).
PWBA Tour Championship Week – PWBA Cleveland Open	Aug 13 BowlTV	Parma Heights, OH	Aug 12–13	Live	Shayna Ng, Singapore (4)	Open event. Top prize $10,000.
PWBA Tour Championship Week – PWBA Pepsi Open	Aug 15 BowlTV	Parma Heights, OH	Aug 14–15	Live	Alexis Runk, USA (1)	Open event. Top prize $10,000.
**PWBA Tour Championship**	Aug 18 BowlTV/Bowling TV	Parma Heights, OH	Aug 16–17	Live	Jillian Martin, USA (5)	Invitational event. PWBA major. 24-player starting field includes all 2026 titlists (PWBA members only) plus highest points earners among non-winners. Top prize $30,000.

== Season awards ==
=== 2026 player awards ===
- PWBA Player of the Year: New Hui Fen
- PWBA Rookie of the Year: Seo Yeon Ryu

=== 2026 points leaders ===
1. New Hui Fen (97,450)
2. Jordan Snodgrass (87,575)
3. Sin Li Jane (83,100)

=== 2026 average leaders (minimum 6 events) ===
1. New Hui Fen (217.52)
2. Jordan Snodgrass (216.04)
3. Sin Li Jane (214.82)

=== 2026 cashes ===
T1. Jordan Snodgrass (11)
T1. New Hui Fen (11)
T3. Sin Li Jane (10)
T3. Liz Johnson (10)

=== 2026 earnings ===
1. Jillian Martin ($96,580)
2. Sin Li Jane ($74,670)
3. Erin McCarthy ($72,900)
