= PWBA Bowling Tour: 2019 season =

- League: Professional Women's Bowlers Association
- Sport: Ten-pin bowling
- Duration: April 25 – September 18
- Season MVP: Shannon O'Keefe

PWBA Tour seasons
- ← 2018 2020 →

The 2019 Professional Women's Bowling Association (PWBA) Tour retained a similar schedule to the 2018 season, with 14 tournaments, 10 standard and 4 majors.

== Season overview ==
The first six standard tournaments of the 2019 season, plus the Striking Against Breast Cancer Mixed Doubles event (a crossover event with the PBA Tour), all start with an open field. The final three standard events of the year feature an “Elite Field” of 24 bowlers, based on season-to-date points, that are automatically placed into the top 32 for match play. The remaining players bowl a qualifying round for the other eight spots in match play.

The final rounds of the first six standard tournaments and the Striking Against Breast Cancer Mixed Doubles event air live on a PBA Xtra Frame Webcast at FloBowling.com. CBS Sports Network airs the final round of the three Elite Field standard tournaments and all major tournaments live.

The USBC Queens and U.S. Women's Open are open to both PWBA members and qualifying USBC members. The PWBA Players Championship major is open to PWBA members only. The season's final event and final major, the PWBA Tour Championship, is an invitational featuring a starting field of only 16 bowlers. Tournament winners from the current season gain automatic entry into the starting field, as long as they are PWBA members. The remaining spots are given to PWBA bowlers with the highest 2019 point totals among non-winners.

== Season awards and statistics ==
=== Player awards ===
- PWBA Player of the Year: Shannon O'Keefe
- PWBA Rookie of the Year: Valerie Bercier

=== 2019 points leaders ===
1. Shannon O'Keefe (148,125)
2. Danielle McEwan (117,085)
3. Dasha Kovalova (109,970)

=== 2019 average leaders (minimum 10 tournaments) ===
1. Shannon O'Keefe (215.63)
2. Danielle McEwan (211.48)
3. Shannon Pluhowsky (210.90)

=== 2019 championship round appearances ===
1. Shannon O'Keefe (7)
2. Danielle McEwan (5)
T3. Dasha Kovalova and Maria Jose Rodríguez (4)

== Tournament summary ==
Below is a list of events scheduled for the 2019 PWBA Tour season. Major tournaments are in bold. Career PWBA title numbers for winners are shown in parentheses (#).

| Event | Airdate | City | Preliminary rounds | Final round | Winner | Notes |
|---|---|---|---|---|---|---|
| Nationwide PWBA Greater Cleveland Open | Apr 27 X | Cleveland, OH | Apr 25–26 | Live | Josie Barnes, USA (3) | Open event. $10,000 top prize. |
| PWBA Twin Cities Open | May 4 X | Eagan, MN | May 2–3 | Live | Shannon O'Keefe, USA (9) | Open event. $10,000 top prize. |
| PWBA Lincoln Open | May 11 X | Lincoln, NE | May 9–10 | Live | Jordan Richard, USA (2) | Open event. $10,000 top prize. |
| **USBC Queens** | May 21 C | Wichita, KS | May 16–20 | Live | Dasha Kovalova, Ukraine (1) | Open event, PWBA major. $20,000 top prize. |
| PWBA Sonoma County Open | Jun 1 X | Rohnert Park, CA | May 30–31 | Live | Shayna Ng, Singapore (2) | Open event. $10,000 top prize. |
| PWBA Tucson Open | Jun 8 X | Tucson, AZ | Jun 6–7 | Live | Shannon O'Keefe, USA (10) | Open event. $10,000 top prize. |
| PWBA Fountain Valley Open | Jun 15 X | Fountain Valley, CA | Jun 13–14 | Live | Sandra Andersson, Sweden (1) | Open event. $10,000 top prize. |
| **U.S. Women's Open** | Jun 23 C | North Las Vegas, NV | Jun 16–22 | Live | Danielle McEwan, USA (5) | Open event, PWBA major. $20,000 top prize. |
| Storm PBA/PWBA Striking Against Breast Cancer Mixed Doubles | Jul 28 X | Houston, TX | Jul 25–27 | Live | Amanda Greene–N, USA and Kyle Sherman, USA | Open PBA and PWBA title event. $20,000 top prize. |
| PWBA East Hartford Open | Aug 3 C | East Hartford, CT | Aug 1–2 | Live | Shannon O'Keefe, USA (11) | Elite field event. $10,000 top prize. |
| Pepsi PWBA Louisville Open | Aug 10 C | Louisville, KY | Aug 8–9 | Live | Dasha Kovalova, Ukraine (2) | Elite field event. $10,000 top prize.+ |
| BowlerX.com PWBA Orlando Open | Aug 17 C | Orlando, FL | Aug 15–16 | Live | Shannon O'Keefe, USA (12) | Elite field event. $10,000 top prize. |
| **QubicaAMF PWBA Players Championship** | Sep 8 C | Raleigh, NC | Sep 3–7 | Live | Cherie Tan, Singapore (2) | Open members-only event, PWBA major. $20,000 top prize. |
| **PWBA Tour Championship** | Sept. 18 C | Henrico County, VA | Sept. 15-18 | Live | Shannon O'Keefe, USA (13) | Invitational event, PWBA major. $20,000 top prize. At Richmond Raceway Old Dominion Building (former Virginia State Fairgrounds). |

- C: broadcast on CBS Sports Network
- X: broadcast on the PBA's Xtra Frame Webcast service at FloBowling.com
- N: non-member at the time of victory, and thus does not qualify for the PWBA Tour Championship
- +: Dasha Kovalova won an additional $10,000 bonus for rolling a 300 game in the title match.
