= PWBA Bowling Tour: 2022 season =

- League: Professional Women's Bowlers Association
- Sport: Ten-pin bowling
- Duration: May 13 – August 9, 2022

PWBA Tour seasons
- ← 2021 2023 →

The 2022 Professional Women's Bowling Association (PWBA) Tour season had a total of 12 title events scheduled in eight locations. These included 8 standard singles title events, three major title events, and one mixed doubles event. While the 2022 schedule had a reduced number of tournaments from 2021, there were more events televised and prize funds increased over previous seasons. All qualifying and match play rounds were broadcast on BowlTV, the PWBA's YouTube channel, as were five final rounds. Seven final rounds were broadcast on CBS Sports Network, including the finals of three major events: USBC Queens, U.S. Women's Open and PWBA Tour Championship.

There were two Classic Series tour stops (versus three in 2021). These included the PWBA Classic Series–Long Island and PWBA Classic Series–Dallas. The first two tournaments in a Classic Series stop have fully open fields, while the third tournament starts with only the top 24 players in pinfall from the qualifying rounds of the first two tournaments.

== Season awards ==
=== Player awards ===
- PWBA Player of the Year: Shannon O'Keefe
- PWBA Rookie of the Year: Olivia Farwell

=== 2022 points leaders ===
1. Shannon O'Keefe (109,250)
2. Danielle McEwan (101,535)
3. Bryanna Coté (92,902.5)

=== 2022 average leaders ===
1. Shannon O'Keefe (214.94)
2. Danielle McEwan (213.64)
3. Jordan Richard (212.04)

=== 2022 championship round appearances ===
1. Shannon O'Keefe (7)
2. Danielle McEwan (6)
3. Bryanna Coté (5)

=== 2022 cashes ===
T1. Shannon O'Keefe (11)
T1. Jordan Richard (11)
3. Three players tied with 10

== Tournament summary ==
Below is a list of events for the 2022 PWBA Tour season. Major tournaments are in bold. Career PWBA titles for winners are in parentheses. All winnings are shown in US dollars.

Event	Airdate	City	Preliminary rounds	Final round	Winner	Notes
PWBA Rockford Open	May 15 CBS Sports Network	Rockford, IL	May 13–14	Live	Stefanie Johnson, USA (4)	Open event. $20,000 top prize.
**USBC Queens**	May 24 CBS Sports Network	Addison, IL	May 19–23	Live	Birgit Noreiks, Germany (3)	Open event. PWBA major. $60,000 top prize.
PWBA Twin Cities Open	May 29 CBS Sports Network	Eagan, MN	May 27–28	Live	Shannon O'Keefe, USA (15)	Open event. $20,000 top prize.
PWBA St. Petersburg-Clearwater Open	Jun 5 CBS Sports Network	Seminole, FL	Jun 3–4	Live	Breanna Clemmer, USA (1)	Open event. $20,000 top prize.
PWBA Classic Series – Long Island Classic	Jun 8 BowlTV	Rockville Centre, NY	Jun 7	Live	Liz Kuhlkin, USA (3)	Open event. $10,000 top prize.
PWBA Classic Series – BowlTV Classic	Jun 10 BowlTV	Rockville Centre, NY	Jun 9	Live	Cherie Tan, Singapore (3)	Open event. $10,000 top prize.
PWBA Classic Series – BVL Classic	Jun 12 CBS Sports Network	Rockville Centre, NY	Jun 11	Live	Bryanna Coté, USA (3)	Top 24 from Long Island Classic and BowlTV Classic qualifying. $10,000 top prize.
**U.S. Women's Open**	Jun 21 CBS Sports Network	South Glens Falls, NY	Jun15–20	Live	Erin McCarthy, USA (2)	Open event. PWBA major. $60,000 top prize.
PBA-PWBA Striking Against Breast Cancer Mixed Doubles	Jul 31 BowlTV	Houston, TX	Jul 28–30	Live	Diandra Asbaty, USA (2) & E. J. Tackett, USA	Open PBA and PWBA title event. $20,000 top prize.
PWBA Classic Series – DFW Classic	Aug 4 BowlTV	Dallas, TX	Aug 3	Live	Bryanna Coté, USA (4)	Open event. $10,000 top prize.
PWBA Classic Series – Pepsi Classic	Aug 6 BowlTV	Dallas, TX	Aug 5	Live	Dasha Kovalova, Ukraine (5)	Open event. $10,000 top prize.
PWBA Classic Series – **PWBA Tour Championship**	Aug 9 CBS Sports Network	Dallas, TX	Aug 7–8	Live	Stephanie Zavala, USA (4)	Top 24 from DFW Classic and Pepsi Classic qualifying. PWBA major. $50,000 top prize.
