= PWBA Bowling Tour: 2021 season =

- League: Professional Women's Bowlers Association
- Sport: Ten-pin bowling
- Duration: January 19 – November 1, 2021

PWBA Tour seasons
- ← 2020 2022 →

The 2021 Professional Women's Bowling Association (PWBA) Tour season had a total of 20 title events scheduled, the most since the 2001 PWBA season. Overall, the season had 16 standard singles title events, three major tournaments (USBC Queens, U.S. Women's Open and PWBA Tour Championship), and the Striking Against Breast Cancer Mixed Doubles tournament (a crossover event with the PBA Tour). All singles events were broadcast on BowlTV, the USBC’s YouTube channel, except for the season-ending PWBA Tour Championship, which was broadcast on CBS Sports Network.

The season kicked off January 19, 2021 in Arlington, Texas with the first of three Classic Series events. Each Classic Series event includes three title tournaments contested in the same location over an eight-day span. The first two tournaments in a Classic Series stop have fully open fields, while the third tournament starts with only the top 24 players in pinfall from the qualifying rounds of the first two tournaments.

On April 29, the PBA announced it was adding an all-women's competition to its King of the Lanes event, which was broadcast live on FS1 on June 15 and 16. (In the 2020 PBA King of the Lanes, two females – Clara Guerrero and Gazmine Mason – participated against an otherwise all-male field.) The King of the Lanes: Empress Edition is a "last person standing" format, where two challengers face each other for a chance to dethrone the reigning Empress over the course of five rounds. Kelly Kulick was chosen as the initial Empress. Challengers included: Clara Guerrero, Daria Pajak, Danielle McEwan, Maria José Rodriguez, Missy Parkin, Diana Zavjalova, Liz Johnson, Ashly Galante, Stefanie Johnson and Verity Crawley.

== Season highlights and awards ==
- On August 10, 2021, Jillian Martin made PWBA Tour history as the youngest player, age 17 years, 16 days, ever to win a national PWBA tournament. Martin, a member of Junior Team USA and the reigning PBA Junior Girls champion, defeated England's Verity Crawley in the final match to win the PWBA BowlTV Classic. The previous record holder for youngest PWBA Tour champion was Wendy Macpherson, who won the 1986 U.S. Women's Open at age 18 years, 68 days.
- This season's U.S. Women's Open, held August 24–31, offered a PWBA record $100,000 top prize, won by Josie Barnes.
- With her win at the PWBA Reno Classic on October 26, Stephanie Zavala became the first PWBA Tour rookie to win three titles since Leanne Barrette in 1987. Zavala also locked up the 2021 PWBA Rookie of the Year award following this win.

=== Player awards ===
- PWBA Player of the Year: Bryanna Coté
- PWBA Rookie of the Year: Stephanie Zavala

=== 2021 points leaders ===
1. Bryanna Coté (129,445)
2. Shannon O'Keefe (129,270)
3. Verity Crawley (128,900)

=== 2021 average leaders ===
1. Shannon O'Keefe (214.73)
2. Shannon Pluhowsky (214.51)
3. Bryanna Coté (213.75)

=== 2021 championship round appearances ===
T1. Bryanna Coté (6)
T1. Verity Crawley (6)
T1. Dasha Kovalova (6)
T1. Stephanie Zavala (6)

=== 2021 cashes ===
1. Liz Johnson (18)
T2. Missy Parkin (17)
T2. Maria José Rodriguez (17)

== Tournament summary ==
Below is a list of events that are scheduled for the 2021 PWBA Tour season. Major tournaments are in bold.

Event	Airdate	City	Preliminary rounds	Final round	Winner	Notes
PWBA Kickoff Classic Series: Bowlers Journal Classic	Jan 21 BowlTV	Arlington, TX	Jan 19–20	Live	Shannon O'Keefe, USA (14)	Open event. $10,000 top prize.
PWBA Kickoff Classic Series: ITRC Classic	Jan 23 BowlTV	Arlington, TX	Jan 22	Live	Bryanna Coté, USA (2)	Open event. $10,000 top prize.
PWBA Kickoff Classic Series: PWBA Hall of Fame Classic	Jan 26 BowlTV	Arlington, TX	Jan 25	Live	Julia Bond, USA (1)	Top 24 from Bowlers Journal Classic and ITRC Classic qualifying. $10,000 top prize.
PWBA Twin Cities Open	Apr 24 BowlTV	Eagan, MN	Apr 22–23	Live	Dasha Kovalova, Ukraine (3)	Open event. $10,000 top prize.
PWBA Lincoln Open	May 1 BowlTV	Lincoln, NE	Apr 29–30	Live	Liz Johnson, USA (25)	Open event. $10,000 top prize.+
PWBA Greater Cleveland Open	May 8 BowlTV	Parma Heights, OH	May 6–7	Live	Stephanie Zavala, USA (1)	Open event. $10,000 top prize.
**USBC Queens**	May 18 BowlTV	Reno, NV	May 12–17	Live	Julia Bond, USA (2)	Open event. PWBA major. $20,000 top prize.
PWBA BVL Open	May 29 BowlTV	Farmingdale, NY	May 27–28	Live	Stephanie Zavala, USA (2)	Open event. $10,000 top prize.
PWBA Albany Open	Jun 5 BowlTV	Albany, NY	Jun 3–4	Live	Kelly Kulick, USA (7)	Open event. $10,000 top prize.
PWBA Greater Nashville Open	Jun 12 BowlTV	Smyrna, TN	Jun 10–11	Live	Verity Crawley, England (1)	Open event. $10,000 top prize.
PBA King of the Lanes: Empress Edition	Jun 15–16 FS1	Portland, ME	Live	Live	Final Empress: Stefanie Johnson, USA; Top Casher: Daria Pajak, Poland ($25,000)	Non-title invitational event. Each round pays $10,000 to the Empress match winner, $5,000 for second, $3,000 for third.
PWBA Louisville Open	Jun 19 BowlTV	Louisville, KY	Jun 17–18	Live	Dasha Kovalova, Ukraine (4)	Open event. $10,000 top prize.
PBA-PWBA Striking Against Breast Cancer Mixed Doubles	Aug 1 FloBowling	Houston, TX	Jul 29–31	Live	Danielle McEwan, USA (6) & E. J. Tackett, USA	Open PBA and PWBA title event. $20,000 top prize.
PWBA Summer Classic Series: GoBowling! Classic	Aug 5 BowlTV	Arlington, TX	Aug 3–4	Live	Birgit Noreiks, Germany (2)	Open event. $10,000 top prize.
PWBA Summer Classic Series: International Bowling Campus Classic	Aug 7 BowlTV	Arlington, TX	Aug 6–7	Live	Jen Higgins, USA (1)	Open event. $10,000 top prize.
PWBA Summer Classic Series: BowlTV Classic	Aug 10 BowlTV	Arlington, TX	Aug 9–10	Live	Jillian Martin, USA (a)	Top 24 from GoBowling! Classic and Int’l Bowling Campus Classic qualifying. $10,000 top prize.
PWBA Spokane Open	Aug 21 BowlTV	Spokane, WA	Aug 19–20	Live	Danielle McEwan, USA (7)	Open event. $10,000 top prize.
**U.S. Women's Open**	Aug 31 CBS Sports	Rohnert Park, CA	Aug 24–30	Live	Josie Barnes, USA (4)	Open event, PWBA major. $100,000 top prize.
PWBA Fall Classic Series: PWBA Reno Classic	Oct 26 BowlTV	Reno, NV	Oct 25–26	Live	Stephanie Zavala, USA (3)	Open event. $10,000 top prize.
PWBA Fall Classic Series: PWBA Pepsi Classic	Oct 28 BowlTV	Reno, NV	Oct 27–28	Live	Julia Bond, USA (3)	Open event. $10,000 top prize.
PWBA Fall Classic Series: **PWBA Tour Championship**	Oct 31 CBS Sports	Reno, NV	Oct 29–30	Live	Shannon Pluhowsky, USA (2)	Top 24 from Reno Classic and Pepsi Classic qualifying. $50,000 top prize.

+ Liz Johnson also earned a $10,000 bonus for rolling a 300 game in the semifinal match.
(a) Competed as an amateur/non-member; no PWBA title awarded.
