= Shannon O'Keefe =

American professional bowler and bowling coach

Personal information
- Born: January 27, 1979 (age 47)
- Height: 1.65 m (5 ft 5 in)
- Weight: 65 kg (143 lb)

Bowling Information
- Affiliation: PWBA
- Dominant hand: Right Power Tweener Delivery
- Wins: 15 PWBA Tour Titles (3 Majors)
- Sponsors: Roto Grip, VISE grips, Coolwick, Genesis, BowlerX.com

Shannon O'Keefe
Current position
- Title: Head Coach
- Team: Jacksonville State
- Conference: CUSA

Coaching career (HC unless noted)
- 2015–2023: McKendree
- 2024–present: Jacksonville State

Accomplishments and honors

Championships
- 4x NCAA Championship (2017, 2022, 2024, 2026) 4x USBC Intercollegiate Team Championship (2017, 2022, 2025, 2026) 1x Conference USA Championship (2026)

Awards
- 8x Coach of the Year (2016-2022, 2026)

Shannon O'Keefe
Medal record
Women's Ten-pin Bowling
Representing United States
Event	1st	2nd	3rd
World Bowling Championships*	7	5	3
World Games	1	1	–
Pan American Games	1	1	2
Total	9	7	5
World Tenpin Bowling Championships
Silver medal – second place	2019 Las Vegas	Singles
Bronze medal – third place	2019 Las Vegas	Team
Bronze medal – third place	2019 Las Vegas	All Events
Bronze medal – third place	2017 Las Vegas	Doubles
Gold medal – first place	2017 Las Vegas	Trios
Gold medal – first place	2015 Abu Dhabi	Team
Gold medal – first place	2013 Henderson	Doubles
Gold medal – first place	2013 Henderson	All Events
Silver medal – second place	2013 Henderson	Team
Gold medal – first place	2011 Hong Kong	Trios
Gold medal – first place	2011 Hong Kong	Team
Gold medal – first place	2007 Monterrey	Singles
Silver medal – second place	2007 Monterrey	Trios
Silver medal – second place	2007 Monterrey	Team
Silver medal – second place	2005 Aalborg	Team
World Games
Gold medal – first place	2022 Birmingham	Singles
Silver medal – second place	2022 Birmingham	Doubles
Pan American Games
Gold medal – first place	2019 Lima	Doubles
Silver medal – second place	2019 Lima	Team
Bronze medal – third place	2019 Lima	Singles
Bronze medal – third place	2019 Lima	All-Events

Shannon O'Keefe (née Rondeau, born January 27, 1979) is an American professional bowler and bowling coach. She currently lives in Jacksonville, Alabama, and is the head coach at Jacksonville State University. She has competed in the United States and internationally and is an 18-time member of Team USA (2005–2022).

Internationally, she is an 8-time World Champion in various events, including Singles, Doubles, Trios, Team, and All-Events, and has won titles across major global competitions, including the World Games, QubicaAMF World Cup, and the Pan American Games.

O'Keefe has won 15 titles on the PWBA Tour, including three major championships, and is a three-time PWBA Player of the Year (2018, 2019 and 2022).

In November 2024, O'Keefe was elected to the United States Bowling Congress (USBC) Hall of Fame, and she was officially inducted with the 2025 class on May 7, 2025.

She served alongside her husband, Bryan O'Keefe, as the head coach of McKendree University women's bowling team for 8 seasons (2014–2023), leading the program to multiple NCAA and USBC Intercollegiate Team Championship (ITC) titles. With Jacksonville State University, despite only becoming a program in 2024, they have already led the program to titles in NCAA, USBC ITCs, and Conference USA titles.

After a long association with Hammer Bowling, O'Keefe is now a member of the Roto Grip pro staff. She is also sponsored by VISE grips, Coolwick Bowling Apparel, Genesis, and BowlerX.com.

== Bowling career ==
=== Start in Bowling ===
O'Keefe began bowling at age 16 after joining her brother's league, later explaining in a 2007 interview that she initially became interested while picking her brother up early and seeing some "cute boys." Her father, Don Rondeau, was also a professional bowler, contributing to her early exposure to the sport. She made her first PWBA Tour appearance approximately 2 1/2 years later in 1999.

=== Original PWBA Tour ===
The PWBA tour ceased operations in 2003 due to inadequate funding.

O'Keefe competed during some of the final years of the original PWBA Tour (1999, 2000, 2001), and was Runner-Up for Rookie of the Year award in 1999, losing to Tiffany Stanbrough.

She did not compete full-time during the 1999, 2000, and 2001 seasons. In 2001, she stopped competing on the tour entirely to transition in marriage with Bryan O'Keefe.

=== PWBA Hiatus ===
After leaving the PWBA tour in 2001, O'Keefe remained active in competitive bowling during the PWBA hiatus. She bowled several regional, national, and invitational events, earning multiple titles and honors outside of Team USA competition.

Her accomplishments during this period include:

- 2001 New York State Queens Champion
- 2003 Lilac City Women's Team and Doubles Champion
- 2001 and 2006 Rochester Queens Champion
- Finalist for the 2007 Harry Glickman Professional Athlete of the Year Award, presented to Oregan's top athlete
- 2010 PBA Southwest Del-Mar Lanes Challenge Champion
- 2011 Texas State Queens Champion - ended up winning by about 250 pins.
- 2011 USBC Women's Championships Scratch Team Champion
- 2014 USBC Championships Diamond Team Champion

Other bowling highlights include a fifth-place finish in the 2007 USBC Queens Tournament, and a runner-up finish in the 2007 U.S. Women's Open. She bowled a 299 on television in the U.S. Open quarterfinals, and at the time tied a record for the most consecutive strikes in a row on television (18 over two games). She finished in fifth place in the 2011 U.S. Women's Open, and in third place at the 2012 U.S. Women's Open.

O'Keefe competed in the 2009 PBA Women's Series, sponsored by the United States Bowling Congress (USBC), and qualified 12th in the 24-game qualifying round with a total of 5,054 pins (210.58 average). In matchplay, which featured best-of-seven game elimination matches, O'Keefe defeated Joy Esterson, 4–3, to advance. She made the quarterfinals of the 2009 PBA Women's World Championship, which was the first women's World Championship under PBA sanction.

In 2010, against mostly male competitors, O'Keefe won a PBA Regional Tour title at the PBA Southwest Region Del-Mar Lanes Challenge.

=== Team USA ===
Shannon O'Keefe earned a spot on Team USA in her first attempt in 2005. She was a member of Team USA for 18 consecutive years, from 2005 through 2022.

In her first year on the team, O'Keefe won a silver medal in the team event at the 2005 World Tenpin Bowling Championships (WTBA) in Aalborg, Denmark. Over the course of her international career, she won 7 WTBA titles, including gold medals in Singles (2007, Monterrey), Doubles (2013, Henderson), Trios (2011, Hong Kong; 2017, Las Vegas), Team (2011, Hong Kong; 2015, Abu Dhabi), and All-Events (2013, Henderson).

O'Keefe was part of the United States team that won the team gold medal at the 2011 World Championships in Hong Kong, the country's first title in that event since 1987.

In addition to the World Tenpin Bowling Championships, O'Keefe won a gold medal in Singles and a silver medal in Doubles at the 2022 World Games in Birmingham, Alabama. At the 2019 Pan American Games in Lima, Peru, O'Keefe won a gold medal in Doubles, a silver medal in Team, and bronze medals in Singles and All-Events.

On November 10, 2018, O'Keefe won the QubicaAMF Bowling World Cup in Las Vegas, Nevada, defeating Malaysia's Sin Li Jane 238–236.

O'Keefe announced early in 2022 that she would be retiring as a Team USA member following the season. She concluded her international career at the PANAM Bowling Champion of Champions event held August 22–25 in Rio de Janeiro, Brazil. O'Keefe won gold in Doubles with partner Bryanna Coté (part of a USA Doubles sweep, as Kris Prather and A. J. Johnson also won gold in the men's event), while also taking gold in All Events. She won silver in the Singles event, finishing behind Clara Guerrero of Colombia.

=== PWBA Rebirth ===
The PWBA Tour was relaunched in 2015, and O'Keefe was among several former members who returned to the tour. Through 2022, she was the only player to have won at least one title every season since the tour's relaunch.

==== 2015 ====
On August 2, 2015, O'Keefe won her first PWBA title in the Striking Against Breast Cancer Mixed Doubles championship, teaming with PBA player Bill O'Neill to take the top prize. The pair won the title match to earn $10,000.

In the 2015 U.S. Women's Open, O'Keefe qualified as the #1 seed but finished as the runner-up for the second time in the event, losing to Liz Johnson in the final match by a single pin, 190-189. Johnson earned $50,000, while O'Keefe earned $25,000.

==== 2016 ====
On May 26, 2016, O'Keefe won her first PWBA singles title, and second PWBA title overall, at the Nationwide PWBA Sonoma County Open. O'Keefe qualified as the #2 seed and defeated Singapore's New Hui Fen 235–226 in the semifinal match before defeating Kelly Kulick 246–203 in the final match. She earned $10,000.

On June 26, 2016, at the Pepsi PWBA Lincoln Open in Lincoln, Nebraska, O'Keefe led the field and defeated Clara Guerrero 252–203 in the championship match. She captured her third PWBA title and earned $10,000.

On July 31, 2016, O'Keefe and Bill O'Neill repeated as champions at the Striking Against Breast Cancer Mixed Doubles championship, giving O'Keefe her fourth PWBA title, and third of the 2016 season.

==== 2017 ====
On August 6, 2017, O'Keefe won her fifth PWBA title in the St. Petersburg-Clearwater Open, defeating Colombia's Clara Guerrero 202–200 in the final match. She earned $10,000. This title qualified O'Keefe for the season-ending Smithfield PWBA Tour Championship.

On September 6, 2017, at the Smithfield PWBA Tour Championship, she defeated Kelly Kulick 222–203 to win her first career major title, earning her $20,000.

O'Keefe finished the 2017 season ranked third with 100,190 points, behind Kelly Kulick (104,000) and Liz Johnson (154,150).

==== 2018 ====
On May 5, 2018, O'Keefe won her seventh PWBA title at the PWBA Sonoma County Open. She defeated Ida Andersson 226–160, Shayna Ng 214–186, and Verity Crawley 268–266 in the championship match. She earned $10,000.

On May 22, O'Keefe won her eighth PWBA title and second career major at the USBC Queens in Reno, NV. She advanced through match play by defeating Karen Marcano 694–687, Ashly Galante 649–631, Anna Andersson 685–563, and Amanda Fry 748–688 before losing to Bryanna Cote 641–637 to secure the #2 seed for the televised finals. In the semi-finals, O'Keefe defeated Liz Johnson 247–224. In the championship match, O'Keefe defeated Bryanna Cote 221–189 to win the title. She earned $20,000.

Following the second-to-last tournament of the 2018 season, O'Keefe was named PWBA Player of the Year, having mathematically secured enough points to clinch the award. She led the tour in final round appearances and earnings for the season.

O'Keefe also won the BPAA's Dick Weber Bowling Ambassador Award, an honor given annually to the "bowling athlete who has consistently shown grace on and off the lanes by promoting the sport of bowling in a positive manner".

==== 2019 ====
On May 4, 2019, O'Keefe captured her ninth PWBA title at the PWBA Twin Cities Open in Eagan, Minnesota. O'Keefe defeated Verity Crawley 189–182 in the championship match to earn $10,000.

On June 8, 2019, O'Keefe captured her tenth PWBA title at the PWBA Tucson Open in Tucson, Arizona. O'Keefe defeated Maria José Rodríguez 259–195 in the championship match to earn $10,000.

On August 3, 2019, O'Keefe won her third title of the 2019 season and 11th overall at the PWBA East Hartford Open in East Hartford, Connecticut. O'Keefe defeated Brigit Poppler 225–203 in the championship match to earn $10,000.

On August 17, 2019, O'Keefe became the first player since 2001 to win at least four titles in a PWBA Tour season, capturing her 12th title overall at the BowlerX.com PWBA Orlando Open. In the semi-finals, O'Keefe defeated Rocío Restrepo 226–201. In the championship match, O'Keefe defeated Danielle McEwan 207–202. She earned $10,000.

In the 2019 PWBA Players Championship, O'Keefe climbed the stepladder from the #5 seed to reach the championship match. She defeated Dasha Kovalova 222–195, Liz Johnson 257–213, and Shannon Pluhowsky 231–191 before losing to the top seed Cherie Tan 245–204. O'Keefe earned $10,000 as runner-up, while Tan earned $20,000. O'Keefe's runner-up finish secured her enough points to clinch her second consecutive PWBA Player of the Year award.

On September 8, 2019, O'Keefe completed her season with her 13th PWBA title and third career major by winning the PWBA Tour Championship. In the semi-finals, O'Keefe defeated Stefanie Johnson 234–223. In the championship match, O'Keefe defeated Dasha Kovalova 268–179.

Through the first 13 events of the season, O'Keefe made the championship finals six times, posting a 9–2 record in her matches. She finished the season with more than 30,000 points ahead of runner-up Danielle McEwan (148,125 to 117,085). She also led the 2019 Tour in earnings ($87,275), as well as championship round appearances (7). She had the highest average (215.63) among bowlers who participated in at least ten events.

==== 2020 ====
With the 2020 PWBA Tour being cancelled due to the COVID-19 pandemic, the PBA Tour added two women's teams to its 2020 PBA League tournament. In the July 7 expansion draft, O'Keefe was chosen first overall by Phoenix Fury manager Kim Terrell-Kearney.

==== 2021 ====
On January 21, 2021, O'Keefe won the season-opening event of the PWBA Tour season, the Bowlers Journal Classic, earning her 14th career title. In the semi-finals, O'Keefe defeated Missy Parkin 245–212. In the championship match, O'Keefe defeated Danielle McEwan 243–225. She earned $10,000.

This title marked the sixth consecutive PWBA Tour season in which Shannon won at least one title, a feat matched only by Danielle McEwan through 2021.

O'Keefe had an opportunity to secure her third consecutive PWBA Player of the Year award in the season-ending PWBA Tour Championship. Qualifying as the fifth and final seed for the televised finals, she needed to win her opening match to earn the necessary points, but fell to fourth seed Stephanie Zavala 203–200. She earned $9,000. O'Keefe ultimately finished runner-up for Player of the Year to Bryanna Cote, while earning the High Average Award for the 2021 season.

==== 2022 ====
O'Keefe made the televised finals in two of the first three events of the season. She won the 2022 Twin Cities Open from the #4 seed, climbing the stepladder by defeating Dasha Kovalova 227–159, Bryanna Cote 228–163, Danielle McEwan 247–204, and top seed Missy Parkin 213–192. She earned $20,000 for her 15th career PWBA title.

O'Keefe reached the championship finals in 7 of 11 singles events during the 2022 season and did not finish lower than ninth in any event. Her performance, including a fifth-place finish in the season-ending PWBA Tour Championship, secured enough points to win her third PWBA Player of the Year award.

For the season, she led the tour in points, average, championship round appearances and match play appearances, while tying for first in cashes. O'Keefe also became the only bowler to win at least one title per season since the PWBA relaunch in 2015, a distinction she had previously shared with Danielle McEwan until McEwan went winless in the 2022 season.

==== 2023 ====
O'Keefe's streak of seven consecutive PWBA seasons with as least one title ended in the 2023 season. Despite not winning a title, she cashed at all eight events she entered, earning $26,094 for the season.

O'Keefe withdrew from the 2023 U.S. Women's Open after eight games, due to what she later confirmed was anxiety and panic attacks. She has been candid about her struggles that have gone on for two years. In June 2025, she posted to her fan page on Facebook: "I miss the PWBA, the fans, the proprietors, competing, and my friends. I don’t know when but I’m determined I will be back, and by the love and grace from God, He will make a way."

==== 2024–2025 ====
In November 2024, O'Keefe was elected to the USBC Hall of Fame. She was officially inducted on May 7, 2025.

=== Career PWBA Titles ===
Major championships are in bold text.

1. 2015 PBA-PWBA Striking Against Breast Cancer Mixed Doubles w/Bill O'Neill (Houston, TX)
2. 2016 Nationwide PWBA Sonoma County Open (Rohnert Park, CA)
3. 2016 Pepsi PWBA Lincoln Open (Lincoln, NE)
4. 2016 PBA-PWBA Striking Against Breast Cancer Mixed Doubles w/Bill O'Neill (Houston, TX)
5. 2017 PWBA St. Petersburg-Clearwater Open (Seminole, FL)
6. **2017 Smithfield PWBA Tour Championship** (Richmond, VA)
7. 2018 Nationwide PWBA Sonoma County Open (Rohnert Park, CA)
8. **2018 USBC Queens** (Reno, NV)
9. 2019 PWBA Twin Cities Open (Eagan, MN)
10. 2019 PWBA Tucson Open (Tucson, AZ)
11. 2019 PWBA East Hartford Open (East Hartford, CT)
12. 2019 BowlerX PWBA Orlando Open (Orlando, FL)
13. **2019 PWBA Tour Championship** (Richmond, VA)
14. 2021 PWBA Bowlers Journal Classic (Arlington, TX)
15. 2022 PWBA Twin Cities Open (Eagan, MN)

== Coaching career ==
=== McKendree ===
Shannon O'Keefe joined McKendree University in June 2014 as head coach of the women's bowling program. Her first collegiate season was 2014–2015. During her years at McKendree, she led the program to multiple national titles and was named NTCA Coach of the Year seven times (2016–2022)

==== Intercollegiate Team Championships (ITC) Results ====
2015 – Defeated Stephen F. Austin 4–2; lost to North Carolina A&T 4–2; eliminated by Stephen F. Austin 4–1 (contender’s bracket)

2016 – Defeated Newman 4–3, Webber International 4–0, and Florida State 4–2 to reach the semifinals; lost to Webber International 4–3

2017 – Defeated Notre Dame (OH) 4–3, Newman 4–1, UW–Whitewater 4–3, and Midland 4–3 to reach the championship match; defeated Webber International 3–2 (best-of-five) to win the ITC title

2018 – Defeated UAB 4–1, SCAD 4–0, Stephen F. Austin 4–1, and SCAD 4–1; lost to Lindenwood 3–1 (best-of-five championship match)

2019 – Defeated Delaware State 4–3, Pikeville 4–1, Stephen F. Austin 4–1, and Delaware State 4–3; lost to Robert Morris–Illinois 3–2 (best-of-five championship match)

2020 – Not held due to the COVID-19 pandemic

2021 – Defeated Newman 4–3; lost to North Carolina A&T 4.5–2.5; advanced through contender’s bracket with wins over Stephen F. Austin 4–1, Newman 4–0, and Mount Mercy 4.5–3.5; eliminated by North Carolina A&T 4.5–1.5 (semifinals)

2022 – Lost to Delaware State 4–1; defeated SCAD Savannah 4–0; eliminated by Mount St. Mary’s 4–0

2023 – Defeated Webber International 4–2, St. Francis (IL) 4–1, Stephen F. Austin 4–2, and North Carolina A&T 4–3; defeated Maryville 3–2 in the championship match to win the ITC title

==== NCAA Championships Results ====
2017 - Defeated University of Nebraska 4–0

2022 - Defeated Stephen F. Austin 4–0

Total National Titles at McKendree:

- Intercollegiate Team Championships: 2 (2017, 2023)
- NCAA Championships: 2 (2017, 2022)

Total: 4 National Titles

=== Jacksonville State ===
O'Keefe was named head coach of the women's bowling program at Jacksonville State University in 2023, as the program was launched. The school had just joined Conference USA in 2021, with bowling added as a conference sport beginning in the 2023–2024 season.

Although the program is only a few seasons old, she has led the program to several major titles within its first seasons of competition, earning NTCA Coach of the Year honors again in 2026.

==== Intercollegiate Team Championships (ITC) Results ====
2024 – Defeated Saint Xavier 4–1, Louisiana Tech 4–2, Mount Mercy 4–3; defeated Mount Mercy 4–3 (contender's bracket rematch); eliminated by Wichita State 3–2 in the semifinals.

2025 – Defeated Lindenwood 4–0, SCAD Savannah 4–1, and Saint Xavier 4–2; defeated Saint Xavier (contender's bracket rematch); defeated Mount Mercy 3–0 to win the ITC title.

2026 – Defeated Maryville 4–1, Central Missouri 4–0, North Carolina A&T 4–0; defeated North Carolina A&T 4–3 (contender's bracket rematch); defeated McKendree 3–0 in the championship match to win the ITC title.

==== NCAA Championship Results ====
2024 – Defeated Youngstown State 1081–981 (team match, 216 average); defeated Youngstown State 1186–1112 (Baker match, 237 average) to win the title.

2026 – Defeated Wichita State 2–0 and Vanderbilt 2–0; defeated Wichita State 4–1 to win the NCAA Championship

==== Conference USA Championship ====
2025 – Lost to Wichita State 1040–1018 (team match); defeated Wichita State 1105–1034 (baker match); tied series 1–1 and lost the deciding best-of-seven match 4–3.

2026 – Defeated Valparaiso 2–0, Nebraska 2–1, and Arkansas State 2–0; lost to Arkansas State 2–1, forcing an if-necessary best-of-seven match against Arkansas State, winning 4.5–3.5.

Total Titles at Jacksonville State University:

- Intercollegiate Team Championships: 2 (2025, 2026)
- NCAA Championships: 2 (2024, 2026)
- Conference USA Championships: 1 (2026)

Total: 5 National Titles

== Softball career ==
Prior to her bowling career, Shannon O'Keefe was a first team all-American center fielder in softball at Portland State University. In 1998, as a freshman, she posted a .410 batting average (3rd best in program history), recorded 66 hits (9th best in school history), and finished with a .471 on-base percentage (9th best in program history), while also leading the team with 18 stolen bases that season. She also accumulated 15 outfield assists during her collegiate career. She stopped playing softball at 19 years old.

At age 15, she was among the final 160 women competing for a spot on the 1996 Team USA Softball Team.

In 2007, O'Keefe was recognized at the Oregon Hayward Awards as a finalist for "Professional Woman Athlete of the Year".

== Personal life ==
She met her husband, Bryan O'Keefe, at age 20 when the two were bowling at the 1999 Super Hoinke tournament in Cincinnati. He later became her coach and mentor, and the two eventually married. Bryan is a former men's bowling coach at McKendree University (later a member of the athletic department staff), where Shannon coached the women's team. In 2021, Bryan was named head coach of Team USA, after serving as head coach of Junior Team USA since 2017.

Outside of bowling, O'Keefe enjoys playing golf and is a fan of the Buffalo Bills NFL team. While she and her husband lived in Greece, New York, they were Bills season ticket holders.
