= PWBA Bowling Tour: 2017 season =

- League: Professional Women's Bowlers Association
- Sport: Ten-pin bowling
- Duration: April 27 – September 6
- Season MVP: Liz Johnson

PWBA Tour seasons
- ← 2016 2018 →

The 2017 Professional Women's Bowling Association (PWBA) Tour retained a similar schedule to the 2016 season, with 14 tournaments, 10 standard (9 singles, 1 doubles) and 4 majors. The season ran April 27 to September 6. CBS Sports Network aired the final round of all standard PWBA Tour events this season on a tape-delay basis. The final round for the major tournaments aired live or on same-day delay. TV tapings of the non-major stepladder finals were conducted in conjunction with first three major tournaments on May 23 (USBC Queens), June 25 (PWBA Players Championship) and August 6 (U.S. Women's Open).

The season's final event and final major, the Smithfield PWBA Tour Championship, was an invitational featuring a starting field of only 16 bowlers. Tournament winners from the current season gained automatic entry into the starting field, with the remaining spots given to bowlers with the highest 2017 point totals among non-winners.

The PBA/PWBA Striking Against Breast Cancer Mixed Doubles, a cross-over event with the PBA Tour, returned for 2017. PBA and PWBA titles were awarded to the male and female winners, respectively.

== Season awards and statistics ==
=== Player awards ===
- PWBA Player of the Year: Liz Johnson
- PWBA Rookie of the Year: Daria Pajak

=== 2017 points leaders ===
1. Liz Johnson (154,150)
2. Kelly Kulick (104,000)
3. Shannon O'Keefe (100,190)

=== 2017 match play appearances ===
1. Liz Johnson (11)
2. Shannon O'Keefe (10)
T3. Kelly Kulick (9)
T3. Maria Jose Rodriguez (9)

=== 2017 final round appearances ===
1. Liz Johnson (9)
T2. Kelly Kulick (4)
T2. Danielle McEwan (4)

== Tournament summary ==
Below is a recap of events scheduled for the 2017 PWBA Tour season. Major tournaments are in bold. Career PWBA title numbers for winners are shown in parentheses (#).

Event	Airdate	City	Preliminary rounds	Final round	Winner	Top Prize
QubicaAMF PWBA Sonoma County Open	Jun 6 C	Rohnert Park, CA	Apr 27–29	May 23	Rocio Restrepo, Colombia (3)	$10,000
PWBA Storm Sacramento Open	Jun 13 C	Citrus Heights, CA	May 4–6	May 23	Liz Johnson, USA (20)	$10,000
PWBA Fountain Valley Open	Jun 20 C	Fountain Valley, CA	May 11–13	May 23	Kelly Kulick, USA (6)	$10,000
**USBC Queens**	May 23, 10pm EDT C	Baton Rouge, LA	May 17–22	May 23, Noon EDT	Diana Zavjalova, Latvia (2)	$20,000
PWBA Wichita Open	Jul 4 C	Wichita, KS	Jun 1–3	Jun 25	Siti Rahman, Malaysia (1)	$10,000
Pepsi PWBA Lincoln Open	Jul 11 C	Lincoln, NE	Jun 8–10	Jun 25	Sin Li Jane, Malaysia (1)	$10,000
PWBA Greater Detroit Open	Jul 18 C	Canton, MI	Jun 15–17	Jun 25	Daria Pajak, Poland (1)	$10,000
**GoBowling.com PWBA Players Championship**	Jun 25 C	Green Bay, WI	Jun 21–24	Live	Liz Johnson, USA (21)	$20,000
PBA/PWBA Striking Against Breast Cancer Mixed Doubles	Jul 30 X	Houston, TX	Jul 27–29	Live	Birgit Poppler, Germany (1) and Jason Sterner, USA	$16,000
PWBA Orlando Open	Aug 15 C	Orlando, FL	Jun 29–Jul 1	Aug 6	Stefanie Johnson, USA (2)	$10,000
PWBA St. Petersburg-Clearwater Open	Aug 22 C	Seminole, FL	Jul 6–8	Aug 6	Shannon O'Keefe, USA (5)	$10,000
Nationwide PWBA Rochester Open	Aug 29 C	Rochester, NY	Jul 15–17	Aug 6	Danielle McEwan, USA (3)	$10,000
**U.S. Women’s Open**	Aug 6 C	Plano, TX	Jul 31–Aug 5	Live	Liz Johnson, USA (22)	$20,000
**The Smithfield PWBA Tour Championship**	Sep 6 C	Richmond, VA	Sep 3–5	Live	Shannon O'Keefe, USA (6)	$20,000

- C: broadcast on CBS Sports Network
- X: broadcast on the PBA's Xtra Frame webcast service
