= PWBA Bowling Tour: 2020 season =

- League: Professional Women's Bowlers Association
- Sport: Ten-pin bowling
- Duration: Season cancelled

PWBA Tour seasons
- ← 2019 2021 →

The 2020 Professional Women's Bowling Association (PWBA) Tour retained a similar schedule to the 2019 season, with nine standard singles tournaments and four majors, plus the PBA-PWBA mixed doubles tournament. The 2020 PWBA season was expected to start on April 23, but as of March 15 it was postponed indefinitely due to the coronavirus pandemic.

On June 3, 2020, the PWBA chose to cancel the 2020 season due to continued uncertainty surrounding the COVID-19 pandemic. According to USBC Executive Director Chad Murphy: “Sadly, we do not see a workable way to operate a national tour in 2020 across varying venues and states in a manner that meets standards for a professional sports league.” BPAA Executive Director Frank DeSocio noted there is still a possibility to conduct special, non-title events for PWBA players later in 2020.

== Tournament summary ==
Below is a list of events that were scheduled for the 2020 PWBA Tour season prior to the COVID-19 shutdown. Major tournaments are in bold.

Event	Airdate	City	Preliminary rounds	Final round	Winner	Notes
PWBA Tucson Open	Apr 25 BowlTV	Tucson, AZ	Apr 23–24	Live		Open event.
PWBA Spokane Open	May 2 BowlTV	Spokane, WA	Apr 30–May 1	Live		Open event.
PWBA Sacramento Open	May 9 BowlTV	Citrus Heights, CA	May 7–8	Live		Open event.
**USBC Queens**	May 19 CBS Sports	Las Vegas	May 13–18	Live		Open event, PWBA major.
PWBA Greater Cleveland Open	May 30 BowlTV	Parma Heights, OH	May 28–29	Live		Open event.
PWBA Rockford Open	Jun 6 BowlTV	Rockford, IL	Jun 4–5	Live		Open event.
PWBA East Texas Open	Jun 13 BowlTV	Longview, TX	Jun 11–12	Live		Open event.
**U.S. Women's Open**	Jun 30 CBS Sports	Dallas, TX	Jun 23–29	Live		Open event, PWBA major.
PWBA Las Vegas Open	Jul 12 CBS Sports	Las Vegas	Jul 8–11	Live		Open event.
PBA/PWBA Striking Against Breast Cancer Mixed Doubles	Aug 2 BowlTV	Houston, TX	Jul 30–Aug 1	Live		Open PBA and PWBA title event.
PWBA Greater Columbus Open	Aug 8 CBS Sports	Columbus, OH	Aug 6–7	Live		Open Elite Field event.
PWBA Tennessee Open	Aug 15 CBS Sports	Clarksville, TN	Aug 13–14	Live		Open Elite Field event.
**PWBA Players Championship**	Aug 23 CBS Sports	Seminole, FL	Aug 19–22	Live		Open members-only event, PWBA major.
**PWBA Tour Championship**	Sep 9 CBS Sports	Henrico County, VA	Sep 6–8	Live		Invitational event, PWBA major.
