= Jillian Martin =

American professional ten-pin bowler

Personal information
- Born: July 25, 2004 (age 22)

Bowling Information
- Sport: Tenpin bowling
- Affiliation: PWBA
- Rookie year: 2021
- Dominant hand: Right (power stroker delivery)
- Wins: 5 PWBA Tour (3 majors)
- Sponsors: Storm Products, Turbo grips

Jillian Martin (born July 25, 2004) of Stow, Ohio is an American professional ten-pin bowler who competes as a member of the Professional Women's Bowling Association (PWBA), following a collegiate career at the University of Nebraska–Lincoln. She made history in 2021 as the youngest bowler (age 17) to win an event on the PWBA Tour, doing so as an amateur at the PWBA BowlTV Classic in Arlington, Texas. Martin made history again in 2026, becoming the youngest player to earn a career "triple crown" of PWBA majors (2024 USBC Queens, 2026 U.S. Women's Open and 2026 PWBA Tour Championship). She also competes internationally as a four-time and current member of Team USA.

Martin bowls right-handed using a power stroker delivery. She is sponsored by Storm Products and Turbo finger grips.

== Amateur career ==
Prior to college, Martin was the youngest female (age 14) to ever make Junior Team USA, as well as the youngest to lead qualifying in total pinfall. After watching her compete in a Storm Youth Championship event in March 2019, PBA superstar Jason Belmonte declared on social media: "Remember the name Jillian Martin. She will be the best bowler in the world one day." Martin attended Stow–Munroe Falls High School in Ohio, where she graduated with honors in the top ten percent of her class.

Martin was a two-time top qualifier at the U18 Junior Gold Championships (2021 and 2022), rolling a 300 game at the 2021 event. She earned double-digit wins in Elite Youth Tour and Storm Youth Championships competition.

She became a five-time Junior Team USA member and has been a Team USA member every year since 2023. She has won ten medals (five gold, three silver, two bronze) in international competition between Junior Team USA and Team USA.

In her freshman season at Nebraska, Martin won the NTCA Rookie of the Year award, was a first-team NTCA All-American, and won the Freshman Female Athlete of the Year award across all Nebraska sports. She went on to be named first-team NTCA All-American in her next three seasons, and was named to the Big Ten All-Academic Team three times. In her senior season, she was named UNL Female Student Athlete of the Year. She graduated in May 2026 with a bachelor's degree in Biological Sciences.

== Professional career ==
While still in high school, Martin won the 2021 PWBA BowlTV Classic to become the youngest player ever (17 years, 16 days) to win a PWBA Tour event, defeating England's Verity Crawley in the championship match. Because Martin competed as an amateur, she was not credited with a PWBA title. PWBA Hall of Famer Wendy Macpherson had held the distinction as the youngest PWBA champion since 1986, when she won the U.S. Women's Open at age 18.

During her college years at Nebraska, Martin won two more PWBA events as an amateur. In the 2024 USBC Queens, she became that event's youngest-ever champion (age 19) with a final match win over Hope Gramly. Later in the 2024 season, she won the PWBA Pepsi Open, defeating Stephanie Zavala in the championship match.

Martin turned pro in 2026, and quickly won her first official PWBA title (fourth PWBA win overall) at the U.S. Women's Open. As the #4 seed she climbed the ladder, eventually defeating top seed and former U.S. Women's Open champion Sin Li Jane of Malaysia in the title match. After the two tied the regulation match at 212, Martin won on the fourth ball of sudden death roll-off, getting a strike to Jane's 9-count. It was the second PWBA Tour major win for Martin. In the final event of the 2026 season, the PWBA Tour Championship, Martin qualified as the top seed and defeated second seed Birgit Noreiks of Germany in the final match. In doing so, Martin won her second major of the 2026 season, and third major overall. Having previously won the USBC Queens and U.S. Women's Open, she is the youngest PWBA player ever (22 years, 24 days) to earn a career "triple crown".

=== PWBA championships ===
Major events are in bold text.

1. 2021 PWBA BowlTV Classic (Arlington, Texas)*
2. **2024 USBC Queens** (Green Bay, Wisconsin)*
3. 2024 PWBA Pepsi Open (Allen Park, Michigan)*
4. **2026 U.S. Women's Open** (Indianapolis, Indiana)
5. **2026 PWBA Tour Championship** (Parma Heights, Ohio)
- *Competed as an amateur.

== Personal ==
Jillian is an Ohio native and the daughter of John and Lori Martin. She is known to friends and teammates as "Silly Jilly" because of her fun and goofy personality. Outside of bowling, she enjoys working out, playing the trumpet, and learning to cook.
