= Storm Products =

American manufacturing company

- Type: Public company
- Traded as: Private
- Industry: Bowling products
- Founder: Bill & Barbara Chrisman
- Headquarters: Brigham City, Utah
- Number of locations: None
- Number of employees: 200
- Website: stormbowling.com

Storm Products Inc. is an American company involved in the manufacture and sale of bowling balls and bowling-related accessories. The company headquarters and main manufacturing facility are in Brigham City, Utah. Storm has produced many bowling balls used in the sport by competitive players, and has numerous sponsorship agreements on both the PBA and PWBA Tours. Storm currently employs about 165 people (about 120 in Utah). The company manufactures about 500,000 balls a year, and ships to 70 countries.

Storm Products also owns the Roto Grip and 900 Global bowling ball brands, and 3G Shoes.

== History ==
Storm Products was founded by Bill and Barbara Chrisman in 1985. The company originated as High Score Products, a chemical company that developed bowling ball cleaners. In 1991, with assistance from Bill's friend and fellow bowling enthusiast Keith Orton, the company began manufacturing high-performance bowling balls, creating a subsidiary called Storm. At the time, High Score Products was still the parent company, but by 1994, the company changed its name to Storm Products Inc.

In 1997, Storm acquired the Roto Grip brand of bowling balls. Storm has also acquired the Master brand of bowling accessories. In 2000, Storm Products Inc. patented a process to add fragrances to bowling balls.

In 2014, Storm Products announced it had made an investment in Global Manufacturing LLC of San Antonio, Texas, makers of the 900 Global brand of bowling balls and 3G bowling shoes. However, Storm stated that 900 Global will operate as an independent company with separate research and design teams. Further, bowlers with Storm sponsorships on the PBA Tour could not use 900 Global equipment, and vice versa. In April 2020, 900 Global's manufacturing moved from Texas to Storm's Utah facility, due to executive orders by the Governor of Texas related to the COVID-19 pandemic. The design, research, development and marketing teams remained in San Antonio.

On September 29, 2020, Storm fully acquired all assets of Global Manufacturing, adding 900 Global and 3G products to the Storm marketing portfolio. As a result, Storm and Roto Grip sponsored players on the PBA and PWBA tours can now use 900 Global equipment, and vice versa.

In 2021, both Bill and Barbara Chrisman were inducted into the USBC Hall of Fame for meritorious service. It marked the first time ever that a husband and wife were inducted into this Hall of Fame in the same year. Bill had previously been inducted into the Utah State USBC Hall of Fame in 2005.

On September 28, 2023, Storm co-founder and CEO Bill Chrisman died at the age of 74.

In February, 2024, Bill and Barbara Chrisman were voted into the PBA Hall of Fame for meritorious service. They were officially inducted at a ceremony in Akron, Ohio on April 27, 2024.

== Notable Storm-sponsored bowlers ==
Bowlers sponsored by Storm brands as of January, 2026.

=== Storm ===
- Diandra Asbaty
- Josie Barnes
- Dominic Barrett
- Jason Belmonte
- Verity Crawley
- Norm Duke
- Clara Guerrero
- Tom Hess
- Leanne Hulsenberg
- Liz Johnson
- Kelly Kulick
- Thomas Larsen
- François Lavoie
- Tim Mack
- Jillian Martin
- Danielle McEwan
- Brad Miller
- Shayna Ng
- Kyle Sherman
- Jesper Svensson
- Darren Tang
- Kyle Troup
- Chris Via
- Pete Weber

=== Roto Grip ===
- Tom Baker
- Carolyn Dorin-Ballard
- New Hui Fen
- Sin Li Jane
- Justin Knowles
- Wes Malott
- Kevin McCune
- BJ Moore
- Shannon O'Keefe
- Kristopher Prather
- Jordan Snodgrass
- Anthony Simonsen
- Cherie Tan
- Michael Tang
- Stuart Williams
- Diana Zavjalova

=== 900 Global ===
- Andrew Anderson
- Chris Barnes
- Ryan Barnes
- Brandon Bonta
- Mitch Hupé
- Erin McCarthy
- Daria Pająk
- Chris Sloan
- Timmy Tan
- Richie Teece
