= Louise Fulton =

American professional ten-pin bowler

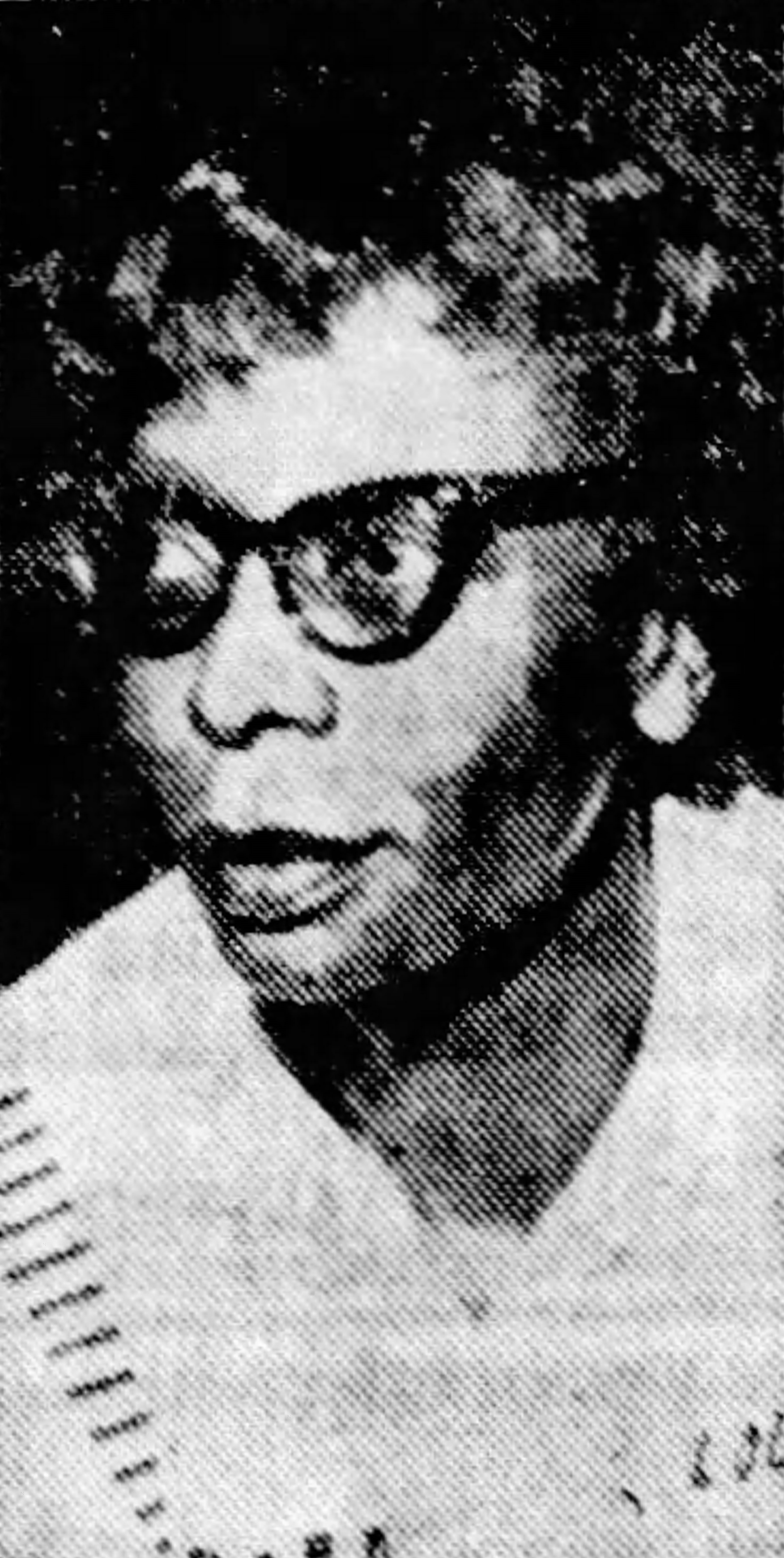
- Fulton in 1968

Personal information
- Born: Louise Vivian Fulton c. 1917 (Note: Sources conflict: The Historic Pittsburgh website lists her birth year as 1916, while an obituary stated she was 69 at the time of her death on May 7, 1988, which meant that she would have had to have been born in 1918 or 1919; another article, from the Pittsburgh Post-Gazette in 1998, said that she was 70 at the time of her death, which would mean she was born in either 1917 or 1918.) Kingstree, South Carolina, U.S.
- Died: May 7, 1988 (aged 69–70) Pittsburgh, Pennsylvania, U.S.
- Years active: c. 1950 – c. 1970s

Bowling Information
- Affiliation: PWBA
- Rookie year: 1962
- Dominant hand: Right

Louise Vivian Fulton (c. 1917 – May 7, 1988) was an American professional ten-pin bowler. A bowling pioneer, she was the first African American to win a professional tournament and was one of the first African Americans to compete in the women's professional bowling tour. She also was the first of her race to be invited to a professional league when she joined the Professional Women's Bowling Association (PWBA) in 1962 and was inducted into the United States Bowling Congress Hall of Fame in 2001, among other honors.

== Biography ==
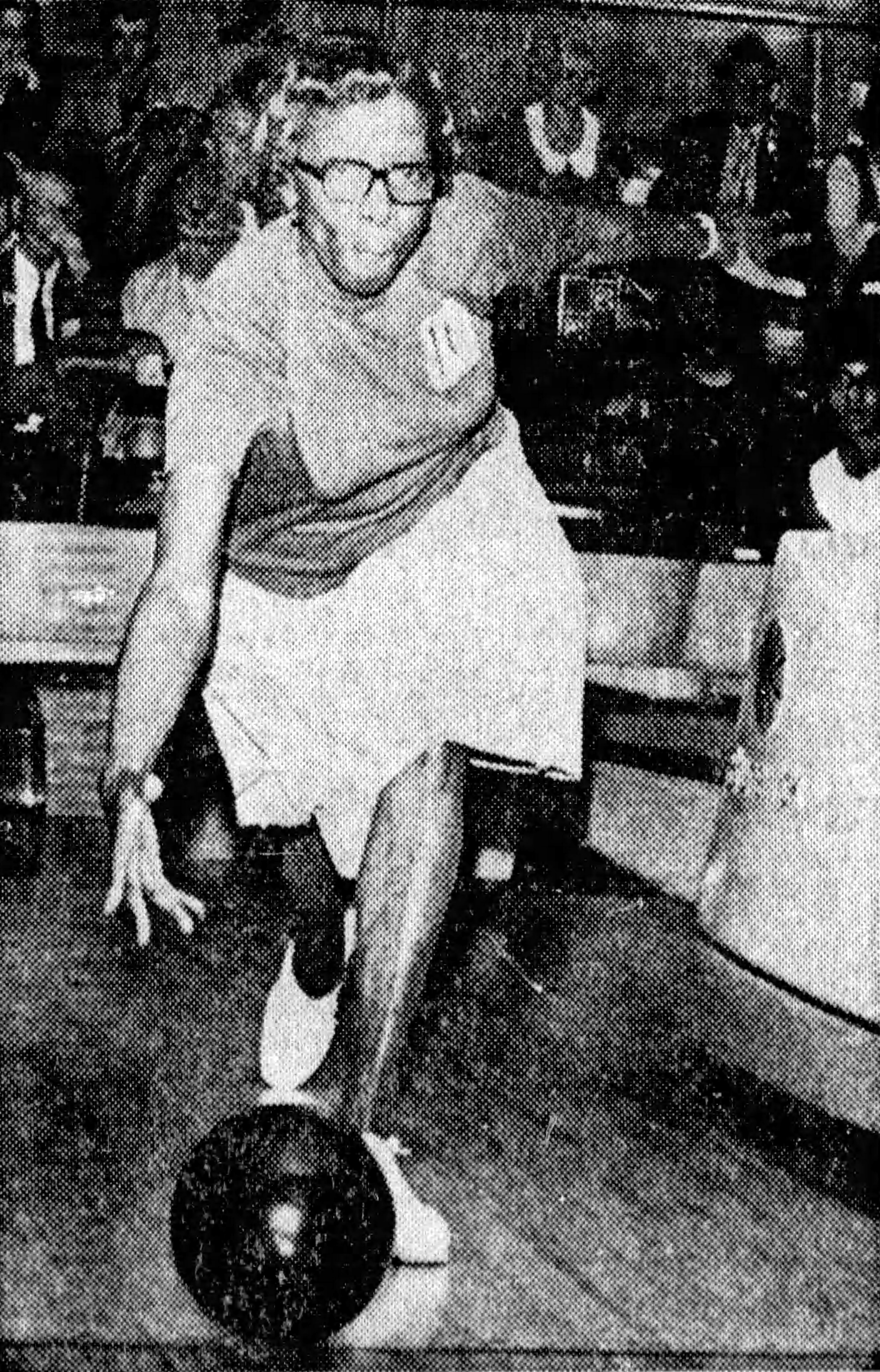
Fulton bowling in 1974

Fulton was born in c. 1917, in Kingstree, South Carolina. She was one of 10 children, and had five sisters and four brothers. (Note: One of her sisters, Marjorie Mitchell, was also a bowler and competed with her at several tournaments.) She spent the first few years of her life in Kingstree, before her family moved to Pittsburgh, Pennsylvania, when she was seven years old. She attended Peabody High School, where she played softball and basketball.

Fulton started bowling in her 20s, beginning her career in c. 1950. Ted Page served as her coach from c. 1954 onward and by 1955 she had won the Western Pennsylvania tournament with an average score of 197 pins. Fulton then began "breaking records and knocking down racial barriers as well as bowling pins": in 1960, she gained national attention for winning the Pittsburgh Proprietors Elimination tournament and placing third in the state tournament, which allowed her to go to the National All-Star tournament in San Bernardino, California, where she became one of the first two African American women ever to participate there (along with Sadie Dixon).

In 1961, Fulton became the first African American ever to enter the All-Star Doubles tournament, which was held that year in Latham, New York. That season, she averaged 190 pins per game and had 30 sets of 600 pins or better, as well as two sets of over 700, which were the highest numbers all-time by a woman of color. She ranked as one of the top woman bowlers nationally and was described by Ted Page as "the most dangerous woman bowler."

Fulton was accepted into the Professional Women's Bowling Association (PWBA) in 1962, becoming the first African American to ever be invited to a professional league. Later that year, she became the first of her race ever to qualify for a national professional tournament. Two years later, she was invited to the PWBA Princeton Open tournament and made her way through the bracket to the finals, where she defeated Betty Kuczynski 191 pins to 188 and became the first African American to win a professional bowling tournament. Several years later, she participated in the women's professional bowling tour and became one of the first of her race to do so. In 1969, she won both the individual and doubles championships in the Pennsylvania Women's Bowling Tournament. She continued bowling through the 1970s.

Fulton was involved in bowling affairs outside of competition as well, including being the owner of the Meadow Bowling Lanes in Homewood. She also for two terms was the Greater Pittsburgh Bowling Proprietors Association president, was a member of the board of directors for the Pittsburgh Women's Bowling Association, directed the Pennsylvania State Women's Bowling Association for a time and served as a delegate for the Annual Meeting for close to 30 years. Outside of sports, she worked in Homewood as a dental assistant.

Fulton received numerous honors and awards, including being the first African American inducted into the United States Bowling Congress Hall of Fame in 2001. She was also inducted into the Western Pennsylvania Sports Hall of Fame (1971), the Pittsburgh Women's Bowling Association Hall of Fame (1977), the National Bowling Association Hall of Fame (1983), the Pennsylvania State Women's Bowling Association Hall of Fame (1991), the International Women's Bowling Congress Hall of Fame in 2000, and was given the Joyce Deith Trailblazer Award in 1999.

Fulton died on May 7, 1988, of cancer.
