= PWBA Bowling Tour: 2015 season =

- League: Professional Women's Bowlers Association
- Sport: Ten-pin bowling
- Duration: May 13 – September 13
- Season MVP: Liz Johnson

PWBA Tour seasons
- 2003 2016 →

The Professional Women's Bowling Association (PWBA) Tour returned from a 12-year hiatus in 2015, thanks to a three-year funding commitment from the USBC and BPAA. The 2015 tour had 11 tournaments (8 standard, 3 majors), running from May 13 to September 13. Major tour stops included the following:

- USBC Queens (May 13–19, Green Bay, WI)
- Bowlmor AMF U.S. Women's Open (Aug. 31-Sept. 6, North Brunswick, NJ)
- The Smithfield PWBA Tour Championship (Sept. 10-13, Garland, TX)

Standard stops have a guaranteed prize fund of $60,000 (minimum $10,000 first prize). The U.S. Women's Open has a top prize of $50,000, while the other two majors award a $20,000 top prize. The USBC Queens finals were broadcast live May 19 on ESPN2. The U.S. Women's open finals (September 6) and PWBA Tour Championship finals (September 13) were broadcast live on CBS Sports Network.

Additionally, a new partnership with the Professional Bowlers Association (PBA) provides:

- Seven PWBA (women-only) Regional tournaments conducted by the PBA's respective regional managers, each with a $10,000 prize fund based on a minimum of 40 entries.
- Player services transportation and mobile pro shop for the PWBA Tour stops.
- Live coverage of the PWBA Tour stops through Xtra Frame, the PBA's online video streaming service.
- Eligibility for PWBA members to bowl in all PBA events.
- An expanded points program for women bowling in PBA Regionals, culminating in the ESPN-televised PWBA Regional Challenge at the PBA World Series of Bowling VII.
- A crossover event with the PBA Tour—the Striking Against Breast Cancer Mixed Doubles tournament on July 31-August 2.

== Tournament summary ==
Below is a recap of events held during the 2015 PWBA Tour season. Major tournaments are in bold. Career PWBA title numbers for winners are shown in parentheses (#).

Event	Airdate	City	Preliminary rounds	Final round	Winner	Top Prize
**USBC Queens**	May 19 E2	Green Bay, WI	May 13–18	Live	Liz Johnson, USA (15)*	$20,000
PWBA Storm Sacramento Open	N/A	Citrus Heights, CA	July 9–10	July 11	Elysia Current, USA (1)	$12,000
PWBA Lubbock Sports Open	N/A	Lubbock, TX	July 16–17	July 18	Jazreel Tan, Singapore (1)	$10,000
PWBA Wichita Open	N/A	Wichita, KS	July 23–24	July 25	Stefanie Johnson, USA (1)	$10,000
PBA/PWBA Striking Against Breast Cancer Mixed Doubles	Aug 2 X	Houston, TX	Jul 31–Aug 1	Live	Shannon O'Keefe, USA (1) and Bill O'Neill (USA)	$15,000
PWBA Topeka Open	N/A	Topeka, KS	Aug 6–7	Aug 8	Liz Kuhlkin, USA (1)	$10,000
PWBA Lincoln Open	N/A	Lincoln, NE	Aug 13–14	Aug 15	Amanda Greene, USA (1)	$10,000
PWBA Minnesota Open	N/A	Welch, MN	Aug 20–22	Aug 23	Diana Zavjalova, Latvia (1)	$10,000
PWBA Greater Detroit Open	N/A	Canton, MI	Aug 27–29	Aug 30	Liz Johnson, USA (16)	$10,000
**Bowlmor AMF U.S. Women's Open**	Sep 6 C	North Brunswick, NJ	Aug 31–Sep 5	Live	Liz Johnson, USA (17)	$50,000
**The Smithfield PWBA Tour Championship**	Sep 13 C	Arlington, TX	Sep 10–12	Live	Danielle McEwan, USA (1)	$20,000

- C: broadcast on CBS Sports Network
- E2: broadcast on ESPN 2
- X: broadcast on the PBA's Xtra Frame webcast service
- *Through the PWBA Tour's final season before its hiatus (2003), Liz Johnson had 11 titles. The PWBA has since credited her three majors won during the hiatus as PWBA titles, giving her 14 titles prior to the start of the 2015 season.
