= Kim Adler =

American Ten-pin bowling professional

Personal information
- Born: September 14, 1967 (age 58) Springfield, Massachusetts, U.S.
- Education: East Longmeadow (MA)
- Years active: 1991-2003

Sport
- Country: United States
- Sport: Ten-pin bowling
- League: PWBA
- Turned pro: 1991
- Retired: 2003

Achievements and titles
- National finals: 15 PWBA Tour (3 majors); PWBA Rookie of the Year (1991); USBC Hall of Fame (2016); PWBA Hall of Fame (2022); Bowlers Journal Bowler of the Decade (1990s) nominee

Kim Adler born September 14, 1967) is an American Ten-pin bowling professional who was a member of the Professional Women's Bowling Association (PWBA). The right-hander is considered one of the top female bowling players of all time, competing professionally from 1991–2003 and collecting 15 national PWBA titles (tied for 17th most all-time), including major tournament wins at the 1996 Hammer LPBT Players Championship, 1997 Sam's Town Invitational and the 1999 U.S. Women's Open. In addition to her PWBA accomplishments, Adler placed first in Classic All-Events at the 2004 USBC Women's Open Championships.

Adler is a 2016 inductee into the USBC Hall of Fame, and a 2022 inductee into the PWBA Hall of Fame.

== Personal ==
Adler was born September 1967 in Springfield, Massachusetts, and grew up in neighboring town, East Longmeadow. She moved to Florida in 1992. She retired from the PWBA in 2003, after the organization folded. She returned to college in 2004, first becoming an Emergency Medical Technician-Paramedic, then a Registered Nurse, then finally a certified Nurse Practitioner.

== Bowling career ==
Adler made her PWBA debut in 1991 at age 23. She started slowly, making only two cash cuts that season, and another two cuts in 1992. In 1993, her career took off. She made fifteen Top 10 finishes that season, won her first PWBA title at the Alexandria Open in Alexandria, Louisiana, and finished runner-up for PWBA Player of the Year. She won a second title in 1994 at the AMF Ninja Challenge in Corpus Christi, Texas.

1995 was Adler's first PWBA season with multiple titles, as she won the Storm Doubles-Sam's Town with partner Nancy Fehr, then won a singles title at the Hammer Eastern Open. She won two titles in each of the next five seasons (1996 through 2000), including major championships at the Hammer Players Championship (1996), Sam's Town Invitational (1997) and U.S. Women's Open (1999).

After a down year in 2001, she rebounded with her 15th and final title in 2002. Adler made 56 career championship round appearances and advanced to the final match of a PWBA tournament 26 times, going 15–11 in those matches.

=== Bowling Statistics, Titles, Accomplishments ===
- PWBA Professional Women's' Bowling Association Hall of Fame member, Superior Performance (2022)
- USBC Hall of Fame member, Superior Performance (2016)
- 15 National PWBA Titles (three majors)
- 2004 USBC Women's National All Events Champion
- 26 career 300 games
- High Series: 823
- Five time All-American Team, including 2000 Team Captain
- Bowlers Journal Bowler of the Decade (1990s) Nominee
- 2000 Metropolitan Bowling Writers Bowler of the Year
- 1999 Southern Bowling Writers Bowler of the Year
- 1999 U.S. Women's Open champion
- 1997 Sam's Town Invitational champion
- 1996 Hammer LPBT Players Championship champion
- 1993 PWBA Player of the Year, runner-up
- 1991 PWBA Rookie of the Year
- 5th woman in bowling history to roll back-to-back 300 games
- 1st 800 series by a woman on the newly developed Sport Pattern by USA Bowling, 2001
- Ranked in the Worldwide Top 10 for ten seasons
- Career PWBA Average: 210.51
- Career TV Average: 212.82
- Career PWBA TV Appearances: 56 (1st=15, 2nd=11, 3rd=8, 4th=11, 5th=11).
- Career PWBA earnings: $822,743 (9th all-time).

=== List of PWBA titles ===
Major championships in bold text. (Source: 11thframe.com)

1. 1993 Alexandria Louisiana Open
2. 1994 AMF Ninja Challenge
3. 1995 Storm Doubles (w/Nancy Fehr)
4. 1995 Hammer Eastern Open
5. 1996 Lady Ebonite Classic
6. **1996 Hammer Players Championship**
7. 1997 Sam’s Town Tunica Mid South Classic
8. **1997 Sam’s Town Invitational**
9. 1998 Chattanooga Open
10. 1998 Clabber Girl Greater Terre Haute Open
11. **1999 U.S. Women’s Open**
12. 1999 Lady Ebonite Classic
13. 2000 Las Cruces New Mexico Open
14. 2000 St. Clair Classic
15. 2002 St. Clair Classic

== Additional Information ==
- Adler was the first professional bowler to command outside-the-bowling-industry sponsorships by signing deals with Kiwi Computers, Pacific Pools and Clabber Girl Women's Sports Team. She was the first professional athlete to use eBay to successfully auction advertising space on herself. In her career, she was also sponsored by Brunswick Bowling, Splitsville Lanes, AMF Bowling, Pro Sports Systems, Kegel Training Center, and Moro Designs/Pro Release.
- She has worked as an analyst for a number of women's professional bowling telecasts on CBS Sports Network and ESPN/ESPN2..
- She was a staff writer for Bowling Digest magazine. She was awarded the 2003 Herta Kissel Bowling Writer of the Year.
- She was featured in various articles and interviews over the years in publications such as USA Today, New York Times Magazine, SPORT magazine, Sports Illustrated for Women, Light and Tasty, Chiropractic Today, Bowlers Journal, Florida Today, Chicago Tribune, Off the Lanes, Parade Magazine, MSNBC, Bob & Tom Show, Monsters of the MidDay, and Murray in the Morning.
- She was also a USBC Silver-certified bowling instructor, working with Professional Bowling Camps, Professional Bowling Instruction, Kegel Training Center, and Adler Training Institute.

12/31/15: Official Press Release from USBC on www.bowl.com

ARLINGTON, Texas – Kim Adler of Melbourne, Florida, and Mike Durbin of Hollywood, California, have been elected to the United States Bowling Congress Hall of Fame in the Superior Performance category. The two were among eight bowlers (six men and two women) on the national ballot elected to the 2016 USBC Hall of Fame class by a USBC panel of veteran bowling writers, hall of famers and board members.

The 2016 USBC Hall of Fame induction ceremony will take place April 28 in Las Vegas as part of the USBC Convention. Adler and Durbin, along with three inductees elected in November by the USBC Hall of Fame Committee, will comprise the 2016 USBC Hall of Fame class. Adler, 48, is a 16-time Professional Women’s Bowling Association winner. Her victories came between 1993 and 2003, and her last three titles were at the St. Clair Classic in Fairview Heights, Illinois, in 2000, 2002 and 2003. She was the runner-up for PWBA Player of the Year in 1993 and earned her lone major victory at the U.S. Women’s Open in 1999 [per rules in place at the time]. She also owns four PWBA regional titles. Adler’s success extended to the biggest stage in women’s bowling, the USBC Women’s Championships, where she won Classic All-Events in 2004. She has 11 additional top-10 finishes at the Women’s Championships, including a second-place finish in Classic Singles in 2004 and a runner-up effort at the 2002 USBC Queens.
