= Erin McCarthy =

American ten-pin bowler

Personal information
- Born: July 7, 1990 (age 36)

Bowling Information
- Affiliation: PWBA
- Dominant hand: Right
- Wins: 3 PWBA Tour (2 majors)
- Sponsors: 900 Global, Turbo grips, Apparel EFX

Erin McCarthy (born July 7, 1990) is a right-handed American professional ten-pin bowler from Elkhorn, Nebraska, known for winning the 2022 U.S. Women's Open and 2026 USBC Queens. She bowls professionally on the Professional Women's Bowling Association (PWBA) Tour, and has previously bowled internationally as a member of Team USA.

McCarthy is a member of the 900 Global pro staff, having previously been sponsored by MOTIV Bowling and Hammer. She is also sponsored by Turbo 2-n-1 grip inserts and Apparel EFX.

== Early life and amateur career ==
McCarthy was a two-time all-state bowler (2007 and 2008) at Millard North High School in Omaha, Nebraska. In 2008, she won a national High School Open Singles championship against the top high school seniors in the country.

She attended and bowled for the University of Nebraska–Lincoln, where she was part of the 2009 NCAA Women’s Bowling national champions. She transferred to Midland University in Fremont, Nebraska after her sophomore season. At Midland, she was named Most Valuable Player at the 2012 Intercollegiate Team Championships, where her team finished in second place. McCarthy also completed a nursing degree while at Midland.

McCarthy was a member of Team USA from 2015 to 2017. In 2017, she placed first at the Team USA trials.

== Professional career ==
McCarthy has bowled on the PWBA Tour since its rebirth in 2015, where she has won two major championships among her three total titles.

She earned the top seed in the 2015 USBC Queens major, but finished runner-up to Liz Johnson. Her first professional title came at the 2018 PWBA Louisville Open.

In 2022, McCarthy won her first major championship, climbing the ladder from the #5 seed in the televised final round to win the U.S. Women's Open on June 21. She has two other top-five finishes at the U.S. Women’s Open, placing third in both the 2017 and 2018 events.

On May 19, 2026, McCarthy won her third PWBA title and second major at the USBC Queens. Having gained the top seed in qualifying and match play, she defeated Malaysia's Natasha Roslan in her lone televised finals match, 225–204.

=== PWBA Tour wins ===
Major championships are in bold text

1. 2018 PWBA Louisville Open (Louisville, Kentucky)
2. **2022 U.S. Women’s Open** (South Glens Falls, New York)
3. **2026 USBC Queens** (Las Vegas, Nevada)

== Personal ==
When not bowling selected PWBA Tour events, McCarthy is a full-time critical care nurse, currently working in Omaha.
