= Verity Crawley =

English professional bowler

Personal information
- Full name: Verity Francesca Crawley
- Born: 19 July 1994 (age 32) Bournemouth, England
- Education: Webber International University
- Years active: 1999 – present
- Height: 5 ft 4 in (163 cm)
- Website: veritycrawley.com

Sport
- Sport: Bowling
- Event: PWBA Tour
- Turned pro: 2017

Achievements and titles
- Personal bests: 2 PWBA Tour wins; multiple 300 games
- Updated on 3 June 2023

Verity Crawley (born 19 July 1994) is an English professional bowler who competes on the Professional Women's Bowling Association (PWBA) Tour in the United States. In 2012 Crawley moved from England to Babson Park, Florida to join the bowling program at Webber International University. In 2017, she began competing professionally on the PWBA Tour.

== Amateur career ==
In 2012, Crawley won a singles gold medal and a bronze all-events medal at the European Youth Championships. She was also named 2012 Junior Bowler of the Year by the British Tenpin Bowling Association (BTBA). As a member of Junior Team England, she won two gold medals (singles and team) and two bronze medals (trios and Masters) at the 2011 Junior Triple Crown event.

During her time at Webber International University, Crawley and her teammates won the NAIA National Championship in 2013 and 2014, and the Intercollegiate Team Championship in 2016. Crawley also finished third in the 2015 Intercollegiate Singles Championship. She was named an NAIA second-team All American in the 2013-14 college season, and first-team All American in the 2015-16 season by both the NAIA and NCBCA.

== Professional career ==
In 2017, Crawley began competing on the PWBA Tour. She finished second to Kelly Kulick in the Fountain Valley Open and second in the Greater Detroit Open, falling to her former college teammate Daria Pająk.

The following year, Crawley had three perfect games on the PWBA Tour. She made another bid for her first title at the 2018 PWBA Sonoma County Open, only to lose a high-scoring championship match by two pins to Shannon O'Keefe, 268–266. At the 2019 Twin Cities Open, Crawley defeated Maria José Rodríguez and Bryanna Coté, but fell seven pins short to O'Keefe in the title match.

In the 2021 PWBA season, Crawley won her first title at the PWBA Greater Nashville Open by topping Daria Pająk in the title match on 12 June. She finished the 2021 season tied for most championship round appearances (6) and third in Player of the Year points.

In 2022, Crawley was named 2022 Female Bowler of the Year by the British Tenpin Bowling Association.

On 2 June 2023, Crawley won her second PWBA title at the Grand Rapids Classic in Wyoming, Michigan. After qualifying as the No. 2 seed, Crawley defeated American Lauren Pate in the semifinals, then posted a 258–189 victory over top seed Birgit Noreiks of Germany. As a 2023 title winner, Crawley gained automatic entry into the season-ending PWBA Tour Championship, where she earned the #5 seed for the televised finals after 24 games of qualifying. She lost the opening match in the finals, tying #4 seed Erin McCarthy, 268–268 after the standard ten frames, only to lose a one-ball roll-off, 10–6.

On 4 May 2024, Crawley climbed the ladder from the #5 position to reach the final match of the PWBA Go Bowling! Twin Cities Open, but she then lost to top seed Shannon Pluhowsky. She earned $10,000 for her runner-up finish. In her opening match against Crystal Elliott, Crawley rolled the first 11 strikes, but was denied a perfect game when she got a seven-count on her final shot for a 297 score.

Crawley had her best finish in a PWBA major in 2025, finishing second at the PWBA Tour Championship.

=== PWBA Tour titles ===
1. 2021 Greater Nashville Open (Smyrna, TN)
2. 2023 Grand Rapids Classic (Wyoming, MI)

== Personal ==
When not bowling in tournaments, Crawley is the assistant men's and women's bowling coach for Savannah College of Art and Design in Savannah, Georgia.

In July 2024, Crawley was honored with the BPAA Dick Weber Bowling Ambassador award. This annual award, established in 2005, is given by the Bowling Proprietors Association of America to honor "the bowling athlete who has consistently shown grace on and off the lanes by promoting the sport of bowling in a positive manner."
