= Dasha Kovalova =

Ukrainian-American professional bowler

Personal information
- Full name: Dasha Kovalova
- Nationality: Ukrainian
- Born: December 14, 1994 (age 31) Dnipro, Ukraine
- Home town: Muskegon, Michigan, U.S.
- Education: Wichita State University
- Years active: 2016– present
- Website: www.facebook.com/kovalovadk/

Sport
- Sport: Ten-pin bowling
- Event: PWBA Tour
- Turned pro: 2016

Achievements and titles
- National finals: 5 PWBA Tour wins (1 major)
- Updated on 13 May 2024

Dasha Kovalova (born December 14, 1994) is a right-handed Ukrainian-American professional bowler on the Professional Women's Bowling Association (PWBA) Tour in the United States. Following early bowling success in Ukraine, Kovalova moved to the United States in 2012 to attend and compete for Wichita State University, and went professional in 2016. She has five PWBA Tour titles (one major) to date. Currently, she is a pro staff member for Brunswick, Genesis tape, Coolwick sportswear and SCARB Enterprises.

== Youth and amateur career ==
Born in Dnipro to parents Sergii and Oksana Kovalova, Dasha started bowling at age of 10. Her parents both became well-known bowling coaches in Ukraine.

As a junior bowler, Kovalova won the 2012 European Cup. She was the 2011 U19 European Champion in singles and all-events, and the 2012 U19 European Champion in all-events and masters. As a member of Team Ukraine from 2013 to 2017, she won two gold medals, one silver medal and three bronze medals.

She earned honorable mention as an NCBCA All-American in her first season at Wichita State University (2012–13). The next three seasons, she earned first team NCBCA All-American honors. In the 2014–15 season, she was named NCBCA Most Valuable Player.

== Professional career ==
After college, Kovalova joined the Professional Women's Bowling Association (PWBA) in 2016, the organization having just returned from an 11-year hiatus the year before. She won her first professional title at the 2019 USBC Queens major on May 21. She would win her second title later in the 2019 season, capturing the Pepsi PWBA Louisville Open on August 10. In this event, Kovalova rolled the fourth televised 300 game in PWBA history, and the first of the four to be bowled in a championship match. She made a bid for her second major title in the season-ending PWBA Tour Championship, but lost the final match to Shannon O'Keefe. Kovalova finished the 2019 season third in PWBA Tour points.

Following a suspended 2020 season (due to the COVID-19 pandemic), Kovalova won the 2021 PWBA Twin Cities Open on April 24 for her third title. On June 19, 2024, she won the PWBA Louisville Open for the second time, earning her fourth PWBA Tour title. She finished the 2021 season tied for first in championship round appearances (six).

Kovalova won her fifth PWBA Tour title on August 6, 2022, at the PWBA Pepsi Classic. She finished runner-up to Colombia's Maria José Rodriguez in the 2023 PWBA Tour Championship, her best finish in a major event since 2019.

=== PWBA Tour titles ===
Major championships are in bold text.

1. **2019 USBC Queens** (Wichita, Kansas)
2. 2019 Pepsi PWBA Louisville Open (Louisville, Kentucky)
3. 2021 PWBA Twin Cities Open (Eagan, Minnesota)
4. 2021 PWBA Louisville Open (Louisville, Kentucky)
5. 2022 PWBA Pepsi Classic (Dallas, Texas)

== Additional accolades ==
On March 15, 2026, Kovalova and partner Ashley Denard broke the women's scratch doubles record in the Michigan State USBC Tournament with a 1521. Kovalova rolled a 779 series for three games while Denard rolled 742. The previous record of 1506 was held by Kovalova and Robin Orlikowski.

== Personal ==
Dasha Kovalova now lives in Muskegon, Michigan with her parents. Her parents were in the US for a bowling tournament when the Russian invasion of Ukraine began in February, 2022. Having gained temporary protection status as refugees, the Kovalovas were embraced by Dasha's sponsor, Brunswick, who offered a monetary gift and a job for Sergii.

In October 2025, Dasha officially became a US citizen.

Kovalova enjoys video games, reading, drawing, hiking and going to the gym. She lists bowling Hall of Famers Liz Johnson and Kelly Kulick as her inspirations.
