= Jordan Richard (bowler) =

American ten-pin bowler

Jordan Richard-Snodgrass
Personal information
- Born: December 7, 1995 (age 30)

Bowling Information
- Sport: Tenpin bowling
- Affiliation: PWBA
- Dominant hand: Right
- Wins: 7 PWBA Tour
- Sponsors: Roto Grip, Turbo grips, 3G, Coolwick
Medal record
Women's bowling
Representing United States
Pan American Games
Gold medal – first place	2023 Santiago	Doubles
PABCON Women's Championships
Gold medal – first place	2018 Santo Domingo	Doubles
Gold medal – first place	2018 Santo Domingo	Trios
Silver medal – second place	2018 Santo Domingo	Team
Bronze medal – third place	2018 Santo Domingo	Masters
World Bowling Women's Championships
Gold medal – first place	2019 Las Vegas	Trios
Bronze medal – third place	2019 Las Vegas	Team
IBF Super World Championships
Gold medal – first place	2021 Dubai	Team
PANAM Women's Bowling Championships
Gold medal – first place	2022 Lima	Trios
Gold medal – first place	2022 Lima	Team
Gold medal – first place	2022 Lima	All-Events
Silver medal – second place	2022 Lima	Singles
Silver medal – second place	2022 Lima	Doubles

Jordan Richard-Snodgrass (born December 7, 1995) is a right-handed American professional ten-pin bowler originally from Tecumseh, Michigan who competes on the Professional Women's Bowling Association (PWBA) Tour. She has won seven PWBA Tour titles to date, including three in the 2023 season that saw her earn the PWBA Player of the Year award. Richard also bowls internationally as a seven-time and current member of Team USA.

Richard is a member of the Roto Grip pro staff. She is also sponsored by Turbo grips, 3G shoes and Coolwick Sportswear.

== Amateur career ==
In high school, Richard was a three-time Michigan all-state bowler at Tecumseh High School, as well as a two-time Michigan High School Athletic Association (MSHAA) Division II individual champion.

She began her collegiate career at Central Missouri in the 2014–15 season, and was named both Rookie of the Year and Player of the Year for NTCA Division II/III. She transferred to Division I school Arkansas State for her next three college seasons. She was a first-team all-American all three seasons (2016, 2017 and 2018) and was named NTCA Division I Player of the Year for the 2017 and 2018 seasons.

Richard was a member of Junior Team USA in 2016 and won two medals (silver in team and bronze in singles) at the 2016 World Bowling Youth Championships. She has been a member of Team USA since 2018. Her medal records include:

- Two gold medals (doubles, trios), one silver medal (team) and one bronze medal (Masters) at the 2018 PABCON Women's Championships
- One gold medal (trios) and one bronze medal (team) at the 2019 World Bowling Women's Championships
- One gold medal (team) at the 2021 IBF Super World Championships
- Three gold medals (trios, team, all-events) and two silver medals (singles, doubles) at the 2022 PANAM Women's Bowling Championships

Richard was also the 2018 U.S. Amateur Champion, and was honored as the United States Bowling Congress (USBC) Women's National High Average Award winner in the 2020–21 bowling season.

== Professional career ==
Richard joined the PWBA Tour in the 2018 season. In just her fourth professional event (PWBA Greater Harrisburg Open), she won her first title on June 16 of that year and would later be voted as PWBA Rookie of the Year. She won her second title in 2019 at the PWBA Lincoln Open.

Following the COVID-cancelled 2020 season, Richard went winless in 2021 and 2022. She rebounded in 2023 with three titles. She won the GoBowling! Spokane Open on May 13, then won back-to-back events in June at the Great Lakes Classic and Bowlers Journal Cleveland Open. She placed fourth at the season-ending PWBA Tour Championship, but this finish earned her enough points to lock up 2023 PWBA Player of the Year honors. Richard led her next closest competitor, Diana Zavjalova, by almost 16,000 points (110,162.5 to 94,250). She also led the 2023 Tour in average (219.69) and championship round appearances (6), while tying for the lead in cashes (11).

Richard qualified as the top seed for the 2024 PWBA Tour Championship, but lost the title match on August 13 to Sin Li Jane of Malaysia. Despite not winning a 2024 title, Richard finished the season second in earnings and third in average.

On June 1, 2025, Snodgrass set a PWBA record (since the 2015 restart) with a 12-game qualifying block of 3,018 pins (251.5 average) at the PWBA Rock 'n' Roll Open in Parma Heights, Ohio. However, she would be knocked out in the semifinal round against Singapore's New Hui Fen. On June 7, Snodgrass won the PWBA Bowlers Journal Waterloo Open for her sixth career PWBA Tour title. As the No. 2 seed, she defeated Stephanie Zavala in the semifinal match before topping Correen Acuff, 227–215, in the championship match. The following event, Snodgrass qualified as the top seed at the U.S. Women's Open, her fourth consecutive appearance in the stepladder finals this season. She was the victim of a 290 game by New Hui Fen in the championship match, settling for her second runner-up finish in a major. For the 2025 season, Snodgrass placed first in average (218.86), championship round appearances (5), Top-12s (8), cashes (11, tied with Bryanna Coté) and match play appearances (7, tied with Stephanie Zavala), while placing second in points and third in earnings.

On June 6, 2026, Snodgrass won her seventh PWBA Tour title at the PWBA Barbara Chrisman Classic in Columbus, Ohio. As the top seed, she defeated Sin Li Jane in the championship match, 250–198. She finished the 2026 PWBA Tour season second in points for the second straight year, while finishing first in cashes (11), tied for first in match play appearances (7), second in average (216.04) and second in championship round appearances (5).

=== PWBA Tour wins ===
1. 2018 PWBA Greater Harrisburg Open (Mechanicsburg, PA)
2. 2019 PWBA Lincoln Open (Lincoln, NE)
3. 2023 PWBA GoBowling! Spokane Open (Spokane, WA)
4. 2023 PWBA Great Lakes Classic (Wyoming, MI)
5. 2023 PWBA Bowlers Journal Cleveland Open (Parma Heights, OH)
6. 2025 PWBA Bowlers Journal Waterloo Open (Waterloo, IA)
7. 2026 PWBA Barbara Chrisman Classic (Columbus, OH)

== Personal ==
Richard grew up in Tecumseh, Michigan and now resides in nearby Adrian, Michigan after briefly living in Maumee, Ohio.

Richard says she "didn’t take bowling seriously until high school," and realized she might make a career bowling professionally when the PWBA Tour relaunched during her college years after an 11-year hiatus.

Jordan is now married to PBA bowler Frank Snodgrass, who hails from Center Line, Michigan. The two were married in September, 2024. They bowled as partners in the 2025 PBA-PWBA Striking Against Breast Cancer Mixed Doubles tournament and led after two rounds of qualifying, eventually finishing in eighth place.
