= Stephanie Zavala =

American ten-pin bowler

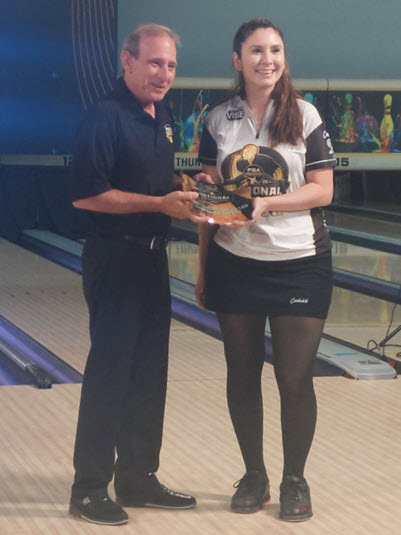
- Zavala accepting an award from PBA Hall of Famer Norm Duke in 2025

Personal information
- Born: May 29, 1996 (age 30)

Bowling Information
- Affiliation: PWBA
- Dominant hand: Right
- Wins: 6 PWBA Tour (1 major); 2021 PWBA Rookie of the Year
- Sponsors: Hammer, VISE, Dexter, BowlerX.com, Coolwick

Stephanie Zavala (born May 29, 1996) is a right-handed American professional ten-pin bowler from Downey, California, known for winning the 2022 PWBA Tour Championship. She bowls professionally on the Professional Women's Bowling Association (PWBA) Tour, and has bowled internationally as a multi-year member of Team USA.

Zavala was a member of the 900 Global pro staff through the 2025 season. In 2026, she signed with Hammer Bowling. She is also sponsored by VISE grips, Dexter shoes, BowlerX.com and Coolwick Sportswear.

== Amateur career ==
Zavala finished runner-up to Julia Bond in the 2017 U.S. Amateur Championships. She bowled collegiately for Sam Houston State University from 2014 through 2018, and was an honorable mention All-American for the 2017–18 season.

At a July 7, 2019 session in her Mexican-American Bowlers Association league at Del Rio Lanes in Downey, California, Zavala rolled games of 279, 300 and 280 for a house-record 859 series. The series was the highest recorded by any female bowler in 2019 across the entire United States Bowling Congress.

Zavala was a member of Junior Team USA in 2017, and is a four-time Team USA member (2017, 2022 through 2024). She won a team gold medal with Team USA at the 2022 PANAM Bowling Women's Championships.

== Professional career ==
Zavala joined the PWBA Tour in the 2021 season. She had immediate success, making six championship round appearances (tied for first), winning three titles (also tied for first), and earning PWBA Rookie of the Year honors. She became the first PWBA Tour rookie to win three titles since Leanne Barrette in 1987. Zavala’s best finish in a 2021 major tournament was fourth at the U.S. Women's Open.

After some early struggles in the 2022 season, Zavala won the season's final event, the PWBA Tour Championship, for her fourth PWBA title and first major. She won in dominating fashion, averaging 250.67 over her three stepladder matches.

On June 4, 2023, Zavala won her fifth PWBA Tour title at the BowlTV Classic in Wyoming, Michigan.

On May 29, 2025 (her 29th birthday), Zavala won the PWBA Cleveland Open for the second time in her career. Qualifying as the top seed, she defeated Olivia Komorowski in her lone finals match to earn her sixth PWBA Tour title. For the 2025 season, Zavala placed first in match play appearances (7, tied with Jordan Snodgrass), while placing third in points and cashes.

=== PWBA Tour wins ===
Major championships are in bold text.

1. 2021 PWBA Greater Cleveland Open (Parma Heights, OH)
2. 2021 PWBA BVL Open (Farmingdale, NY)
3. 2021 PWBA Reno Classic (Reno, NV)
4. **2022 PWBA Tour Championship** (Dallas, TX)
5. 2023 PWBA BowlTV Classic (Wyoming, MI)
6. 2025 PWBA Cleveland Open (Parma Heights, OH)

== Personal ==
Stephanie is a Southern California native and the daughter of Estela and Armando Zavala. She says her father, a regular league bowler, got her started on the lanes when she was just 3 years old. In the offseason, she works for The Professional Approach, a pro shop with three bowling center locations in the Greater Los Angeles area.

Stephanie married Chris Porter in November 2023.
