= Shannon Pluhowsky =

American ten-pin left-handed bowler

Personal information
- Born: August 8, 1982 (age 43) Phoenix, Arizona, U.S.
- Height: 1.70 m (5 ft 7 in)
- Weight: 70 kg (154 lb)

Bowling Information
- Country: USA
- Sport: Bowling
- Affiliation: PWBA, Team USA
- Rookie year: 2001
- Dominant hand: Left (cranker-style full roller delivery)
- Wins: 7 PWBA (3 majors); 3 PBA Women's Series; 1 other (major)
- Sponsors: Hammer Bowling, Turbo Grips, Kameleon Sportswear

Achievements and titles
- World finals: 2002 AMF Bowling World Cup: Champion; 2004 AMF Bowling World Cup: Champion
- National finals: 10 professional titles
Medal record
Women's Bowling
Representing United States
Event	1st	2nd	3rd
World Bowling Championships	5	–	1
Women's World Bowling Championships	1	2	1
World Bowling Singles Championships	–	–	1
World Team Cup	–	1	1
World Games	–	–	–
Pan American Games	1	1	–
PABCON Women's Championships	5	1	3
Total	12	5	7
International Bowling Federation (IBF) World Championships
Gold medal – first place	2025 Hong Kong	Team
Silver medal – second place	2025 Hong Kong	All Events
World Tenpin Bowling Championships
Bronze medal – third place	2013 Nevada	Doubles
Gold medal – first place	2011 Hong Kong	Doubles
Gold medal – first place	2011 Hong Kong	Trios
Gold medal – first place	2011 Hong Kong	Team
Gold medal – first place	2011 Hong Kong	Masters
Gold medal – first place	1999 United Arab Emirates	Masters
Women's World Bowling Championships
Gold medal – first place	2015 United Arab Emirates	Team
Silver medal – second place	2007 Mexico	Team
Silver medal – second place	2005 Aalborg	Team
Bronze medal – third place	2005 Aalborg	Doubles
World Bowling Singles Championships
Bronze medal – third place	2016 Doha	Doubles
World Tenpin Team Cup
Silver medal – second place	2004	Team
Bronze medal – third place	2003	Team
Pan American Games
Gold medal – first place	2015 Toronto	Singles
Silver medal – second place	2015 Toronto	Doubles
American Zone Championships
Gold medal – first place	2005 Costa Rica	Team
PABCON Women's Championships
Gold medal – first place	2018 Dominican Republic	Trios
Silver medal – second place	2018 Dominican Republic	Team
Bronze medal – third place	2018 Dominican Republic	Singles
Bronze medal – third place	2018 Dominican Republic	Doubles
Bronze medal – third place	2018 Dominican Republic	All Events
Gold medal – first place	2016 Colombia	Doubles
Gold medal – first place	2016 Colombia	Trios
Gold medal – first place	2016 Colombia	Masters
Gold medal – first place	2014 Colombia	Team
World Youth Championships
Gold medal – first place	2002 Thailand	Masters
Silver medal – second place	2002 Thailand	Team
Bronze medal – third place	2002 Thailand	Singles
American Zone Youth Championships
Gold medal – first place	2002 USA	Doubles
Gold medal – first place	2002 USA	Team
Gold medal – first place	2002 USA	Masters
Silver medal – second place	2002 USA	Singles
Silver medal – second place	2002 USA	All Events

Shannon Pluhowsky (born August 8, 1982) is an American left-handed ten-pin bowler who competes in the Professional Women's Bowling Association (PWBA) and internationally. Pluhowsky is a 24-time member of Team USA (2001–2021, 2024–2026), and a former four-time member of Junior Team USA (2000–2003). Pluhowsky has won 11 professional championships, including major wins at the 2006 USBC Queens, the 2014 BPAA Women's All-Star, and the 2021 and 2025 PWBA Tour Championship events.

== Early life and college career ==
Pluhowsky was born on August 8, 1982, in Phoenix, Arizona. Before her successful professional career she had a successful amateur and college career. When she was younger she was a three-time Junior Gold Champion and a USOC World Bowler of the Year in 2004. She bowled at the University of Nebraska–Lincoln under coach Bill Straub who is credited for Pluhowsky's impeccable left-handed form. She sports a big push-away and a straight and loose arm swing with a textbook finishing position. She will still consult Straub to this day if she is struggling with her form.

At Nebraska, Pluhowsky was a first-team All-American in three of her four seasons, and second-team All-American in the other season. She was NCBCA Rookie of the Year and Player of the Year in the 2001–02 season, and was awarded Player of the Year again in the 2004–05 season. Shannon won the Intercollegiate Singles Championship in 2004, and her Nebraska team won two NCAA Bowling Championships (2004 and 2005).

== Career accomplishments and accolades under Team USA ==
- One gold medal (team), one silver medal (all-events) at the IBF World Championships in Hong Kong.
- One gold medal (trios), one silver medal (team) and three bronze medals (singles, doubles, all-events) at 2018 PABCON Women's Championships
- Bronze medal at 2016 World Bowling Singles Championships
- Two gold medals (trios, Masters) at 2016 PABCON Women's Championships
- One gold medal (doubles) at the 2016 PABCON Champion of Champions
- One gold medal (team) at 2015 World Bowling Women's Championships
- One gold medal (singles) and one silver medal (doubles) at 2015 Pan American Games
- One gold medal (team) at 2014 PABCON Championships
- Four gold medals at 2011 World Championships (doubles, trios, team, Masters)
- 2002 and 2004 AMF World Cup champion

== Professional career ==
Pluhowsky has won seven PWBA titles, three of them majors, and eleven professional titles overall.

She won the 2006 USBC Queens, which occurred during the PWBA Tour's hiatus (2004 to 2014), but was retroactively credited as a PWBA title. She won the BPAA Women's All-Star in 2014. While regarded as a major title, the PWBA does not recognize it as a title on its own Tour.

Following her best finish at a major in several years (third at the 2021 U.S. Open), Shannon won the season-ending PWBA Tour Championship on October 31, 2021, for her second PWBA Tour title and second major. The tournament, which awarded a $50,000 first prize, was contested at the site of Pluhowsky's first major championship: the National Bowling Stadium in Reno, Nevada.

Looking to repeat as champion in the 2022 PWBA Tour Championship, Pluhowsky qualified as the #1 seed but was defeated in the championship match by #3 seed Stephanie Zavala.

On May 4, 2024, Pluhowsky won the PWBA GoBowling! Twin Cities Open in Eagan, Minnesota. Having qualified as the #1 seed, she beat #5 seed Verity Crawley in the final match to earn her third PWBA Tour title. On June 4, Pluhowsky won her fourth PWBA Tour title, and second of the 2024 season, at the PWBA Music City Classic in Smyrna, Tennessee. Pluhowsky finished the 2024 PWBA Tour season second in average, third in points and third in earnings.

On August 9, 2025, Pluhowsky won the PWBA Pepsi Open in Gates, New York, defeating Hall of Famer Liz Johnson in the final match. Gaining her fifth PWBA Tour title with two of them majors, Pluhowsky is now title-eligible for the PWBA Hall of Fame. Three days later (August 12), she won the PWBA Tour Championship for the second time, defeating Verity Crawley in the final match. This is her sixth PWBA title and third major.

On May 30, 2026, Pluhowsky won the PWBA BowlTV Open. As the top seed, she defeated Julia Bond in her lone finals match to earn her seventh career PWBA title.

Pluhowsky's other three professional titles came in the PBA Women's Series, which ran from 2007 to 2010.

=== List of professional titles ===
Major championships are in bold text.

1. **2006 USBC Queens** (Reno, Nevada)*
2. 2007 Etonic Championship (Cheektowaga, New York)
3. 2009 Chameleon Championship (Allen Park, Michigan)
4. 2009 Scorpion Championship (Allen Park, Michigan)
5. **2014 BPAA Women's All-Star** (Rockford, Illinois)
6. **2021 PWBA Tour Championship** (Reno, Nevada)*
7. 2024 PWBA GoBowling! Twin Cities Open (Eagan, Minnesota)*
8. 2024 PWBA Music City Classic (Smyrna, Tennessee)*
9. 2025 PWBA Pepsi Open (Gates, New York)*
10. **2025 PWBA Tour Championship** (Gates, New York)*
11. 2026 PWBA BowlTV Open (Gates, New York)*
- *Counted as an official PWBA Tour title.

== Other Career Accomplishments ==
Pluhowsky earned the United States Bowling Congress National High Average and High Series Awards for the 2017–2018 season as she set the record for the highest average for a season by a woman. She posted a 250.7 average over 71 games during the Inland Owls league at Capri Lanes in Kettering, Ohio. Pluhowsky was also:

- Inducted into the World Bowling Writers Hall of Fame in 2012
- 2011 World Bowling Writers Bowler of the Year
- 2011 and 2015 Team USA Trials champion
- Three-time USBC Women's Championships titlist (2007 Classic Team, 2011 Scratch Singles, 2015 Diamond Team)
- 2000-01 and 2004-05 Collegiate Player of the Year
- 2000–01, 2001–02 and 2004–05 Collegiate All-America first team
- U.S. Amateur champion in 2001, 2003 and 2004
- 2002 and 2004 World Bowling Writers Female Player of the Year
- 1999, 2000 and 2001 USBC Junior Gold Championships winner

Pluhowsky also won the Striking Against Breast Cancer mixed doubles tournament (with partner Tommy Jones) four times between 2007 and 2011. This is the most all-time wins by any players in the tournament, which is also known as "The Luci" in honor of tournament founder Luci Bonneau. All four wins occurred before this tournament was recognized as a title event for PBA and PWBA players in 2015.

== Personal ==
Pluhowsky is married to massage therapist Carrie (Bland) Pluhowsky as of July 2021. Shannon and Carrie each have children from previous relationships. The couple now resides in Dayton, Ohio.
