= Danielle McEwan =

American ten-pin bowler

Personal information
- Born: September 1, 1991 (age 35)
- Height: 1.73 m (5 ft 8 in)
- Weight: 150 lb (68 kg)

Bowling Information
- Affiliation: PWBA, PBA
- Dominant hand: Right (power stroker delivery)
- Wins: 9 PWBA Tour (2 majors); 2 WBT Women's Finals
- Sponsors: Storm Products, Turbo, KT Tape, High 5 Gear

Danielle McEwan-Urbano (born September 1, 1991) is an American professional ten-pin bowler from Stony Point, New York. She currently competes on the PWBA Tour and in some events on the PBA Tour. She has been a member of Junior Team USA, and is a multi-year and current member of Team USA.

McEwan received national-level NCAA accolades during her college years, and joined Team USA beginning in 2012. Since the rebirth of the PWBA Tour in 2015, McEwan has won nine titles, including major wins at the 2015 Smithfield PWBA Tour Championship and 2019 U.S. Women's Open. She is also a two-time winner of the World Bowling Tour (WBT) Women's Finals.

McEwan is currently a member of the Storm, Turbo Grips, High 5 bowling gear and KT tape pro staffs.

== Early life and amateur career ==
In high school, McEwan chose bowling over tennis as her preferred sport.

In her freshman year at Fairleigh Dickinson University (FDU), McEwan was named MVP of the NCAA National Championships as her team won the title. McEwan was named FDU Female Athlete of the Year in 2012 and 2013, and NCAA All American (2011–2013), receiving the Professional Bowlers Association’s 2012 Billy Welu Scholarship. She was also named Northeast Conference Bowler of the Year (2012) and NCAA Player of the Year (2012 and 2013).

Through her junior year, McEwan had maintained a 3.5 grade point average while majoring in psychology.

McEwan has competed for Team USA since 2012. In December 2015, McEwan and teammate Kelly Kulick won the gold medal in the doubles competition at the Women's World Bowling Championship (WBC) in Abu Dhabi, and both women were on the Team USA team that won the gold medal in the WBC team(-of-five) competition. Individually, McEwan won a bronze medal in the Masters competition.

In July 2017, McEwan won a silver medal at The World Games 2017 in Wrocław, Poland. On December 3, 2017, she earned the Women's All-Events gold medal at the World Bowling Championships in Las Vegas.

== Professional bowling career ==
=== 2015 ===
McEwan was one of the first beneficiaries of the 2015 re-launch of the Professional Women's Bowling Association (PWBA). On September 13, 2015, shortly after her 24th birthday, McEwan won the 2015 Smithfield PWBA Tour Championship, considered her first major title. At that championship, which concluded the first full season of women’s professional bowling since 2003, McEwan ranked fourth for 2015 PWBA Player of the Year.

On October 23, 2015, McEwan became the ninth woman to win a Professional Bowlers Association (PBA) regional title (the South Point PBA West Challenge held in Las Vegas, NV), qualifying her to compete in the (Jan-Feb) 2016 FireLake PBA Tournament of Champions. On October 23–24, 2015, her team "Dead Money" was the upset winner in the PBA Team Challenge. She earned a spot in the three-woman field for the PBA's World Bowling Tour (WBT) Women’s Finals, held in December, 2015. McEwan went on to win the WBT Finals ($20,000 first prize), the event's finalists being chosen and seeded based on PBA International-WBT events over a two-year rolling WBT points competition.

=== 2016 ===
As the leading female bowler in the South Point events and the 2015 U.S. Open, McEwan was invited to participate in the 2016 DHC Japan Invitational tournament, along with 13 male PBA bowlers.

McEwan was selected for the "Barbasol Motown Muscle" PBA League team, one of two women drafted for the 2016 season.

On March 2, 2016, McEwan won the 2016 PBA-WBT H.H. Emir Cup (Doha, Qatar; $20,000 prize); however, because she accepted the eight handicap pins per game offered to female bowlers, she became ineligible to earn a PBA or World Bowling Tour title.

McEwan captured her second PWBA Tour title at the PWBA Wichita Open on June 26, 2016. Her 823 in match play was the first 800 series by any player since the 2015 re-launch of the PWBA Tour.

=== 2017 ===
On February 26, 2017, McEwan repeated as World Bowling Tour Women's Finals champion, defeating Liz Johnson in the final televised match to cash $20,000. On August 6, 2017, McEwan won her third PWBA Tour title at the Nationwide PWBA Rochester Open.

McEwan was unsuccessful in her bid for a third straight World Bowling Tour Women's Finals championship, falling to top seed Diana Zavjalova of Latvia in the final stepladder match held on November 19, 2017.

=== 2018 ===
McEwan won her fourth PWBA title on May 12, 2018 at the PWBA Fountain Valley Open (Fountain Valley, CA). As of this season, she was one of three players (with Liz Johnson and Shannon O'Keefe) to have won at least one title every season since the re-launch of the PWBA Tour in 2015. She finished runner-up to Shannon O'Keefe for 2018 PWBA Player of the Year honors, also finishing second in championship round appearances (6) and third in Tour average (216.39).

McEwan won the PBA International-WBT Thailand tournament on September 28, 2018, topping England's Stuart Williams in a two-game final to win ฿1,000,000 ($31,908 USD). Because McEwan accepted the eight pins per game handicap offered to female competitors, she was not credited with a PBA or WBT title.

=== 2019 ===
On June 23, 2019, McEwan won her fifth PWBA title and second career major at the U.S. Women's Open, defeating top seed Tannya Roumimper of Indonesia in the final match. For a second straight season, McEwan finished runner-up to Shannon O'Keefe for PWBA Player of the Year honors.

=== 2021 ===
On August 1, 2021, McEwan and partner E. J. Tackett won the PBA-PWBA Striking Against Breast Cancer Mixed Doubles tournament, leading the event wire-to-wire (from opening round of qualifying through the finals). The win earned McEwan her sixth PWBA Tour title, and continued her streak of winning at least one PWBA title per season since the 2015 rebirth (there was no 2020 PWBA Tour season due to the COVID-19 pandemic). Only Shannon O'Keefe has matched McEwan's streak. On August 21, McEwan won her second title of the 2021 season and seventh overall, defeating Liz Johnson in the final match of the PWBA Spokane Open. This marks her first PWBA Tour season with multiple titles.

=== 2022 ===
McEwan qualified as the #1 seed in back-to-back 2022 tournaments (PWBA BVL Classic and U.S. Women's Open), but was unable to win the title in either event. In a hard-luck season, McEwan placed second in several 2022 season categories (points, earnings, average and championship round appearances), but did not win a title. This ended her streak of winning at least one title per season since the PWBA re-launch in 2015.

=== 2023 ===
On July 30, 2023, McEwan won the Storm Striking Against Breast Cancer Mixed Doubles tournament with partner Anthony Simonsen. McEwan earned her second title in this event and eighth PWBA title overall.

McEwan qualified for the inaugural (2023) PBA LBC Champions Clash on September 28 in Portland, Maine. This was a special non-title event featuring 12 bowlers, a mix of male-female and amateur-professional, who were part of the PBA's League Bowler Certification (LBC) program and won their division championships. It aired October 1 on Fox Sports 1. McEwan made it to the tenth and final round, where she was defeated by PBA star Tom Daugherty, 10 pins to 7. In the elimination event, McEwan struck on 9 of her 13 shots, which included two strikes in a double roll-off to survive the first round. She won $10,000 for her second place finish.

=== 2024 ===
On July 28, 2024, McEwan and partner Anthony Simonsen repeated as champions at the Storm Striking Against Breast Cancer Mixed Doubles event. This earned McEwan her ninth PWBA Tour title. McEwan's last three PWBA Tour titles have all come in this event.

=== PWBA Tour titles ===
Major championships are in bold text.

1. **2015 The Smithfield PWBA Tour Championship** (Arlington, TX)
2. 2016 PWBA Wichita Open (Wichita, KS)
3. 2016 PWBA Spokane Open (Spokane, WA)
4. 2017 Nationwide PWBA Rochester Open (Rochester, NY)
5. 2018 PWBA Fountain Valley Open (Fountain Valley, CA)
6. **2019 U.S. Women’s Open** (North Las Vegas, NV)
7. 2021 PBA-PWBA Striking Against Breast Cancer Mixed Doubles w/E. J. Tackett (Houston, TX)
8. 2023 PBA-PWBA Striking Against Breast Cancer Mixed Doubles w/Anthony Simonsen (Houston, Texas)
9. 2024 PBA-PWBA Striking Against Breast Cancer Mixed Doubles w/Anthony Simonsen (Houston, Texas)

=== Additional (non-title) professional wins ===
1. 2015 PBA Team Challenge
2. 2015 World Bowling Tour Women's Finals
3. 2016 PBA H.H. Emir Cup
4. 2017 World Bowling Tour Women's Finals
5. 2018 PBA International-WBT Thailand

== Training ==
In addition to bowling practice and gym work (cardio, foam rolling, stretching, and core), McEwan works on her mental game by working with a sports psychologist and by researching books and articles. She says she tries to "make it into the gym every day I can."

== Personal life ==
Aside from bowling, Danielle enjoys outdoor activities such as golf, tennis, snowmobiling, shooting her bow and playing with her dog. She also says, "I love to travel and am very fortunate that my career incorporates so many opportunities to do so. I love seeing different countries and experiencing their culture, sights and food."

From 2013 to early 2018, McEwan dated PBA bowler Marshall Kent. The two initially met when both were members of Junior Team USA, but did not officially become a couple until representing Team USA at an event in Bangkok, Thailand. After almost five years of dating, McEwan and Kent went their separate ways for unspecified personal reasons.

In October 2025, McEwan married Justin Urbano.
