= PWBA Tour Championship =

The PWBA Tour Championship is one of the four major events on the PWBA (Professional Women's Bowling Association) Tour. The tournament has been the final event of the PWBA Tour season since the Tour's rebirth in 2015. It has been held in Arlington, Texas (2015), Midlothian, Virginia (2016) and Richmond, Virginia (2017 through 2019). Since 2021, the PWBA Tour Championship has been the final event of a three-tournament "classic series" stop and has been held in Reno, Nevada (2021), Dallas, Texas (2022), Waterloo, Iowa (2023), Allen Park, Michigan (2024), Gates, New York (2025) and Parma Heights, Ohio (2026).

== Background ==
The original PWBA Tour (1960–2003) had three major events: The U.S. Women's Open (since inception), USBC Queens (since 1961), and the PWBA Players Championship (began as the PWBA Championships in 1960, and has been held on and off under similar names since). When the Tour was restarted in 2015, the PWBA Tour Championship was added to serve as a season-ending playoffs.

Prior to 2021, the PWBA Tour Championship was an invitational event with a starting field of 16 players. Any full-fledged PWBA member who won one of the prior events in the current season automatically made the field of 16, regardless of her season point total. The remaining spots in the field were filled with the women holding the highest point totals among non-winners. (Because a given player could win more than one tournament during the season, the number of at-large invitations could vary.) Invited players are then re-seeded 1 through 16 based on season point totals.

From 2015 through 2019, the tournament was set up in four bracketed elimination rounds. The #5 through #16 seeds bowled in the first round, consisting of head-to-head, best three-of-five matches. The six winners joined the #3 and #4 seeds (who earned first-round byes) in the second round, which consisted of four head-to-head, best three-of-five matches. The four winners of those matches bowled head-to-head, best three-of-five matches in the third round to determine the two bowlers who join the #1 and #2 seeds in the televised finals. The televised final round featured two head-to-head, single-elimination semifinal matches, with the #1 and #2 seeds each facing one of the survivors from the third round. The two winners of those matches then squared off in a single-game final match to determine the champion. Despite being automatically placed into the televised finals, no #1 or #2 seed had ever won the tournament in this format until 2019.

In 2021, the PWBA incorporated a "classic series" format for three tour stops. In this format, the top 24 qualifiers from two stand-alone tournaments form the starting field for a third tournament in the same location. For the 2021 Fall Classic Series, the PWBA Tour Championship was scheduled as the final of the three tournaments for the October 24–31 series, and featured a five-player stepladder final round. By 2023, the 24-player field had returned to a season-long qualifying, with all tournament winners from the current season (if a PWBA member in good standing) gaining automatic entry, and the remaining field being filled by the top season point earners among non-winners.

== Champions ==
=== 2026 Event ===
The 2026 PWBA Tour Championship was held August 16-18 at Yorktown Lanes in Parma Heights, Ohio, with the 24-player starting field consisting of 11 tournament winners from the 2026 season plus the top 13 points earners among non-winners. Total prize fund was $112,100, with a $30,000 top prize. The tournament used a five-player stepladder finals format. Top-seeded Jillian Martin, defeated second seed Birgit Noreiks in the final match. This was Martin's second title and second major of the 2026 season, and the third major among her five total titles. Having won the 2024 USBC Queens and 2026 U.S. Women's Open, she is the youngest PWBA player (22 years, 24 days) to earn a career "triple crown."

Match #1
4	Lauren Russo	236
5	Stefanie Johnson	202

Match #2
3	Diana Zavjalova	166
4	Lauren Russo	258

Match #3
2	Birgit Noreiks	226
4	Lauren Russo	221

Championship Match
1	Jillian Martin	247
2	Birgit Noreiks	221

- Prize Pool:

1. Jillian Martin (Stow, Ohio) – $30,000
2. Birgit Noreiks (Germany) – $15,000
3. Lauren Russo (Wentzville, Missouri) – $10,000
4. Diana Zavjalova (Riga, Latvia) – $6,500
5. Stefanie Johnson (McKinney, Texas) – $5,000

=== Past winners ===
Season	Winner	Runner-up	Championship match score
2015	Danielle McEwan	Stefanie Johnson	233–205
2016	New Hui Fen	Cherie Tan	258–235
2017	Shannon O'Keefe	Kelly Kulick	222–203
2018	Maria José Rodríguez	Kelly Kulick	236–228
2019	Shannon O'Keefe	Dasha Kovalova	268–179
2020	---	---	Not held–COVID-19
2021	Shannon Pluhowsky	Bryanna Coté	244–178
2022	Stephanie Zavala	Shannon Pluhowsky	252–181
2023	Maria José Rodríguez	Dasha Kovalova	234–200
2024	Sin Li Jane	Jordan Richard	215–209
2025	Shannon Pluhowsky	Verity Crawley	235–167
2026	Jillian Martin	Birgit Noreiks	247–221
