= Professional Women's Bowling Association =

Bowling organization

- Abbreviation: PWBA
- Formation: 1960; 66 years ago
- Founded at: The Cherry Bowl in Rockford, Illinois
- Dissolved: 2003 (initial); Relaunch: 2015
- Website: pwba.com
- Logo introduced in 2014 but debuted in the 2015 season

The Professional Women's Bowling Association (PWBA) organizes and oversees a series of annual tournaments for the top competitive women ten-pin bowlers. The series is often referred to as the "women's tour" of bowling.

The PWBA was formed in 1960 but ceased operations in 2003. The PWBA Tour was re-launched in 2015 by the United States Bowling Congress (USBC) and Bowling Proprietors' Association of America (BPAA) with a three-year funding commitment. In addition, through a new partnership with the Professional Bowlers Association (PBA), the PBA began conducting PWBA Regional (women-only) events and PWBA members are now allowed to bowl all PBA events.

== History ==
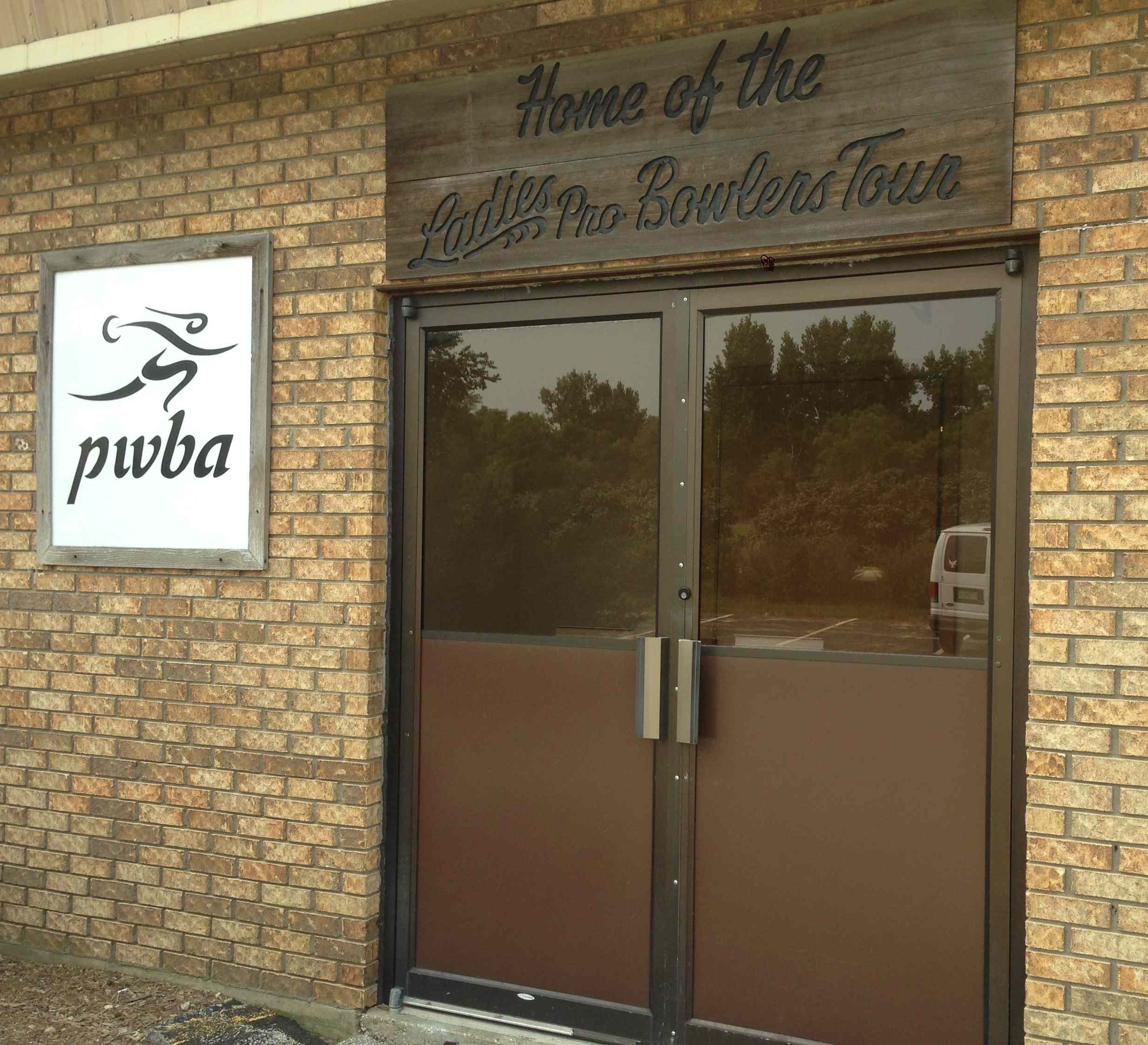
PWBA and LPBT signs still visible July 2014 at the door of the longtime former home of the organizations, The Cherry Bowl in Rockford, IL.

The PWBA was formed in 1960 by a group of professional women bowlers. After the organization struggled, some of the players left the PWBA in 1974 to form the Ladies' Professional Bowlers Association (LPBA). The two merged again in 1978, forming the Women's Professional Bowlers Association (WPBA). When the WPBA dissolved in 1981, bowling center proprietor John Sommer of Rockford, Illinois, started the Ladies Pro Bowlers Tour (LPBT), a private company, to continue the women's tour. The LPBT adopted the PWBA name and a new logo in 1998. In the fall of 2003, the PWBA Tour ceased operations before the completion of its 2003 season, primarily due to dwindling interest in sponsoring women's bowling.

The Women's International Bowling Congress (WIBC) then acquired the rights and assets of the PWBA. This gave the WIBC control of the PWBA name, trademark, logo, website domain (pwba.com), as well as the PWBA's historical records. The United States Bowling Congress (USBC) acquired the PWBA when the WIBC merged with the American Bowling Congress (ABC), Young American Bowling Alliance (YABA) and USA Bowling in 2005.

Without a PWBA Tour, women either retired from professional bowling, competed in the remaining women-only tournaments in the United States, or moved on to other bowling tournaments outside of the United States. Wendy Macpherson started competing in the Japan Professional Bowling Association (JPBA) in 2004, going on to earn ten JPBA titles. In 2007, the Japan Bowling Congress (JBC) started the DHC Cup Girls Bowling International - at the time the third largest women's tournament in the world in prize money, just behind the U.S. Women's Open (bowling) and the USBC Queens.

Some women chose to bowl in professional men's tournaments. The Professional Bowlers Association (PBA) opened its membership to women in April 2004. PWBA members such as Kim Adler, Carolyn Dorin-Ballard, Liz Johnson, and Kelly Kulick became members of the PBA, with Kulick becoming the first female to earn an exemption on the PBA Tour (2005–06 season).

Women have had limited success in PBA events. Missy Parkin was the first female PBA member and now holds three PBA Regional Titles. Johnson was the first woman to make a televised appearance on the PBA Tour, at the 2005 PBA Banquet Open, and the first to defeat a male bowler in a PBA Tour event when she beat Wes Malott in the semifinal match. She would lose to Tommy Jones in the championship final to finish runner-up. Kulick became the first woman to win a national PBA tournament major with her defeat of Chris Barnes in the 2010 Tournament of Champions. Johnson became the second woman to win a national PBA tournament with her defeat of Anthony Pepe in the PBA Chameleon Championship at the 2017 World Series of Bowling.

The USBC sponsored the PBA Women's Series starting with the 2007–08 season, allowing women PBA members to compete in a small number of events without their male counterparts. The final head-to-head match for that week's women's tournament would air in the same telecast as the PBA men's final round. The PBA Women's Series was discontinued after the 2009–10 season.

The PBA created the PBA Women's Regional Tour program in 2014, in which women bowl with and against their male counterparts, but there are specific prizes and benefits for women only.

== In the media before 2015 ==
Many PWBA events were nationally televised on the TVS Television Network (as the Ladies Pro Bowlers Tour) under a five-year contract in the 1980s. When TVS could not maintain payments, it worked with Tom Ficara of the Cable Sports Network to continue coverage. After that agreement expired, Ficara acquired the TVS Network but did not renew the LPBT deal. LPBT final rounds were then televised on ESPN and ESPN2 from the late 1980s up until 2003, when the association folded. From 2004-2006, the WIBC Queens event (renamed USBC Queens in 2005) was the only scheduled event for female bowlers that received TV coverage.

For the autumn of 2007, the USBC acquired rights to the U.S. Women's Open. The event was televised for five Sundays on ESPN, with the action being called by PBA legends Nelson Burton Jr. and Marshall Holman. This event also served as the qualifier for the PBA Women's Series, a special four-stop mini-tour for the top 16 females. The finals for the mini-tour events were televised along with the regular PBA broadcasts for four Sundays on ESPN in November–December, 2007.

The U.S. Women's Open returned for five weeks in September–October, 2008. The PBA Women's Series was expanded to eight events in the 2008-09 and 2009-10 seasons but was then discontinued.

== Season-by-season breakdown ==
=== 2015 PWBA rebirth ===
The PWBA Tour returned from a 12-year hiatus in 2015, thanks to a three-year funding commitment from the United States Bowling Congress (USBC) and Bowling Proprietors’ Association of America (BPAA). The 2015 tour had ten stops (seven standard tournaments and three majors), running from May 13 to September 13.

=== 2016 season ===
The PWBA Tour expanded to 13 events in 2016, with one additional major (GoBowling.com PWBA Players Championship). CBS Sports Network aired the final round of all PWBA Tour events this season on a tape-delay basis, except for majors which aired the final round live.

=== 2017 season ===
The 2017 PWBA Tour retains the format of 2016, with nine standard tournaments and four majors. CBS Sports Network aired the final round of all PWBA Tour events this season on a tape-delay basis, except for majors which aired the final round live or same-day delay.

=== 2018 season ===
Although the three-year funding commitment from the USBC and BPAA ended with the 2017 season, the PWBA announced in 2017 a 2018 season with two enhancements. The final three standard events are replaced with "elite format" events in which the top 24 players on the 2018 PWBA points list after eight events will earn automatic spots, and the remaining eight spots will be filled through an on-site eight-game qualifier each week, for a total field of 32 players. More significantly, the finals of each of the 13 events will take place in the same center where the event's other play took place, with the finals of the standard format events live-streamed, and the finals of the elite format events and majors televised live on CBS Sports Network.

=== 2019 season ===
The 2019 season continued the enhancements started in 2018 and added one event, for a total of 14 events.

=== 2021 season ===
The 2020 PWBA Tour season was cancelled due to the COVID-19 pandemic.

The 2021 PWBA Tour season features 20 title events (the most since 2001), plus a non-title made-for-TV event hosted by the PBA Tour called King of the Lanes: Empress Edition.

=== 2022 and later seasons ===
Since 2022, the PWBA Tour season has run a total of 12 title events per year scheduled in eight locations. These include 8 standard singles title events, three major title events, and one mixed doubles event. While the 2022 schedule had a reduced number of tournaments from 2021, there were more events televised and prize funds increased over previous seasons.

== Top 20 in professional titles ==
List includes singles, doubles and mixed doubles titles earned in events officially recognized by the PWBA. Includes major titles earned during the PWBA Tour hiatus (2004 through 2014), which were retroactively credited as PWBA titles. Excludes PBA Women's Series titles.

Rank	Name	Titles
1	Lisa Wagner	32
2	Aleta Sill	31
3	Leanne (Barrette) Hulsenberg	27
4	Patty Costello	25
4	Liz Johnson*	25
4	Tish Johnson	25
7	Carolyn Dorin-Ballard	20
7	Wendy Macpherson	20
9	Donna Adamek	19
9	Nikki Gianulias	19
11	Betty Morris-Laub	17
11	Robin Romeo	17
13	Carol Gianotti	16
13	Dana Miller-Mackie	16
15	Kim Adler	15
15	Cindy Coburn-Carroll	15
15	Anne Marie Duggan	15
15	Lorrie Nichols	15
15	Shannon O'Keefe	15
20	Pat Costello	13

- *All-time leader in major titles (10)

== Televised perfect games ==
There have been five televised 300 games in title events over the history of the PWBA. Liz Johnson is the only player with multiple televised 300 games, accomplishing the feat in 2001 and 2021.

Player	Air date	Event	Notes
Michelle Feldman	July 10, 1997	PWBA Southern Virginia Open	First 300 game by a female on American national television
Cara Honeychurch	October 7, 1999	AMF Gold Cup	Only televised 300 game by a left-handed PWBA bowler
Liz Johnson	September 15, 2001	Paula Carter Classic	First nationally televised sporting event in the USA following the September 11, 2001 attacks
Dasha Kovalova	August 10, 2019	Pepsi PWBA Louisville Open	First (and so far only) televised PWBA 300 game shot in the title match
Liz Johnson	May 1, 2021	PWBA Lincoln Open	First (and so far only) player with multiple televised 300 games in PWBA events

== Notable members of the PWBA Tour ==
NOTE: Due to marriages, some players may have also won PWBA titles under a maiden name (shown in parenthesis).

- Donna Adamek
- Kim Adler
- Josie Barnes (Ernest)
- Lynda Barnes (Norry)
- Patty Costello
- Verity Crawley
- Carolyn Dorin-Ballard
- Michelle Feldman
- Dotty Fothergill
- Louise Fulton
- Carol Gianotti
- Clara Guerrero
- Leanne Hulsenberg (Barrette)
- Liz Johnson
- Linda Kelly
- Dasha Kovalova
- Kelly Kulick
- Jillian Martin
- Erin McCarthy
- Wendy Macpherson
- Danielle McEwan
- Betty Morris (Burton)
- Shannon O'Keefe
- Daria Pająk
- Shannon Pluhowsky
- Aleta Sill (Rzepecki)
- Jordan Snodgrass (Richard)
- Lisa Wagner
- Stephanie Zavala
- Diandra Asbaty

== Hall of Fame ==
The PWBA hall of fame was founded in 1995 to recognize outstanding competitors on the professional women’s bowling tours and those who provided "outstanding support of professional women’s bowling off the lanes." As of 2026, the hall of fame has a total of 54 members.

There are four categories of inductees, one of which (Pioneer) is no longer active.

- Performance – Started in 1995, inductees of this category must have attained a minimum of 10 qualifying PWBA tour titles, or a minimum of five if at least two of the titles are majors. Players must have reached age 40 prior to their induction year. As of 2026, this category has 33 members.
- Pioneer – Started in 1995 and ended in 1998, inductees of this category played a pivotal role in the establishment of the PWBA tour. This category has 10 members.
- Meritorious Service – Started in 1995, inductees of this category advanced the PWBA organization in a substantial way. As of 2026, this category has 10 members.
- Ambassador – Started in 2019, and only consisting of one member (Paula Carter); this category was created to recognize former PWBA members who promoted the sport and had a major impact on the growth of the tour.
