= Michelle Feldman =

American ten-pin bowler (born 1976)

Personal information
- Born: April 19, 1976 (age 50) Skaneateles, New York, U.S.
- Height: 168 cm (5 ft 6 in)

Bowling Information
- Affiliation: PWBA
- Dominant hand: Right (cranker delivery)
- Wins: 12 PWBA Tour; 2 PBA Women's Series
- Sponsors: Ebonite, VISE grips

Michelle Feldman (born April 19, 1976) is an American right-handed female professional ten-pin bowler and former member of the Professional Women's Bowling Association (PWBA). A native of Skaneateles, New York, she resides in nearby Auburn, New York. In April 2026, she was inducted into the United States Bowling Congress (USBC) Hall of Fame.

== Career ==
In her career, Feldman won 14 professional titles: 12 on the PWBA Tour and two more in the PBA Women's Series. She was named 2002 PWBA Player of the Year and was also honored as the Bowling Digest Bowler of the Year in 2002.

On July 10, 1997, Feldman became the first female bowler to roll a 300 game on American national television. She accomplished the feat at the PWBA Southern Virginia Open at the age of 21.

Feldman was at the peak of her career when the PWBA ceased operations following a truncated 2003 season, going on an 11-year hiatus. She most recently competed in the PBA Women's Series, which was sponsored by the United States Bowling Congress (USBC). She won two of the first three Women's Series events in the 2008–09 season. She failed to win a singles title in the 2009–10 season, but finished high enough in points to earn a spot in the season-ending PBA Women's Series Showdown, which she subsequently won. In this April 6–8 event, Feldman defeated Shannon Pluhowsky and Stefanie Nation in the finals.

During her professional career, Feldman was sponsored by Ebonite International and VISE grips.

Feldman also owns five eagles (titles) in the USBC Women's Open Championships. She won Classic Team in 1998, Classic Singles in 2003 and 2009, Classic All-events in 2003, and Classic Doubles (earned with Aleta Sill) in 2011. Her 816 series (279, 249, 288) in the 2009 Singles was, at the time, the highest score by a female in the event's history. On August 15, 2025, the USBC announced that Feldman had been elected to the USBC Hall of Fame for the 2026 class in the Superior Performance category. She was officially inducted on April 29, 2026. Because injuries prevented her from meeting the USBC's participation requirements (she had suffered a debilitating stroke at age 44), she was granted a medical exemption to allow her election.

Feldman had a high-powered, high-rev "cranker" style delivery that is uncommon among female bowlers. The style earned her the nickname "Twister Sister."

=== PWBA titles ===
1. 1996 Columbia 300 Delaware Open
2. 1997 Southern Virginia Open
3. 1998 Lady Ebonite Classic
4. 2000 Bowl The Rogue Open
5. 2000 Omaha Open
6. 2000 Lady Ebonite Classic
7. 2001 Miller High Life Open
8. 2001 Three Rivers Open
9. 2002 St. Clair Shores Classic
10. 2002 Louisville Open
11. 2002 Greater San Diego Open
12. 2003 Dallas Open

(Source: 11thframe.com)

=== PBA Women's Series titles ===
1. 2008 Chameleon Championship
2. 2008 CLR Carmen Salvino Scorpion Championship

=== Non-title professional wins ===
1. 2010 PBA Women's Series Showdown

=== USBC Women's Open Championships titles ===
1. 1998 Classic Team
2. 2003 Classic Singles
3. 2003 Classic All-events
4. 2009 Classic Singles
5. 2011 Scratch Doubles (w/Aleta Sill)

== Personal ==
Feldman has remained active in the bowling business following her years as a touring professional, and recently held the position of General Manager at Falcon Lanes in Auburn, NY.

== Other sources ==
- Women's Series Player Bios at www.pba.com
