= Brunswick Bowling & Billiards =

Subsidiary of Brunswick Corporation

- Type: Subsidiary
- Founded: 1845; 181 years ago
- Defunct: 2019; 7 years ago
- Fate: All segments sold off
- Headquarters: Mettawa, Illinois, U.S.
- Number of locations: (at its peak)
- Products: Table games, bowling equipment and products
- Services: Bowling centers
- Parent: Brunswick Corporation

Brunswick Bowling & Billiards was the business segment of Brunswick Corporation that historically encompassed three divisions. Billiards, which was the company's original product line, expanded to include other table games such as table tennis, air hockey, and foosball. Brunswick began manufacturing bowling equipment and products in the 1880s. The bowling equipment line was sold to BlueArc Capital Management in 2015, which continues to use the Brunswick name among other brands. Brunswick began to directly operate bowling centers in the mid 1960s. In 2014, the bowling centers were sold to Bowlero Corporation, which phased out the Brunswick name by 2020. The billiard operations were placed in the fitness equipment division, which was spun-off into Life Fitness in 2019. In 2022, the Brunswick Billiards line was sold to Escalade Sports.

== Billiards ==
Logo used by Brunswick Billiards

The billiards division was established in 1845 and was Brunswick Corporation's original business. Brunswick Billiards designs and markets billiards table, table tennis tables, air hockey tables, and other gaming tables, as well as billiard balls, cues, game room furniture, and related accessories, under the Brunswick and Contender brands. Consumer billiards equipment is predominantly sold in the United States and distributed primarily through dealers.

John Brunswick built his first billiards table in 1845 at his woodworking shop in Cincinnati, Ohio, for a successful Chicago meatpacker. The popularity of billiards grew quickly, and by the late 1860s, the U.S. billiards market was dominated by Brunswick's firm and two others. In 1873 Brunswick merged with one of his competitors, Julius Balke's Cincinnati-based Great Western Billiard Manufactory, to form J.M. Brunswick & Balke Company. In 1884, the company merged with the other competitor, New York-based Phelan & Collender, to form the Brunswick-Balke-Collender Company. (The company name was changed to Brunswick Corporation in 1960.) The company grew quickly and added new product lines to its business in the 1880s. Brunswick began selling functional and decorative wooden backs for bars. Prohibition prompted a drastic change in the products offered by the company. And while the Depression was a difficult period for Brunswick, World War II brought a great deal of new business. The company's billiard products were popular in the United Service Organizations (USO) centers. More than 13,000 billiards tables were installed at military bases by 1945.

In 1972 Brunswick Billiards began the design and manufacture air hockey tables. In 2008 the company introduced a line of game room furniture.

Brunswick Billiards dabbled in retail at two times in its history. In 1947 the company opened "Cue and Cushion" establishments, family-friendly billiards establishments that include a lounge and soda fountain. In 2003 the company opened its first “Home & Billiards Store” in the Chicago area, and went on to open one other store in Boston and two in Denver. All of these establishments were later closed, and the company returned to selling its products exclusively through dealers.

Brunswick announced in July 2014 its intention to leave the bowling business by the end of 2014, retaining its heritage billiards business as part of the fitness segment.

In 2018, the company announced it would be spinning-off its fitness equipment business, including its Brunswick Billiards division, as Life Fitness Holdings in 2019. In May 2019, Brunswick announced its intention to sell Life Fitness Holdings to KPS Capital Partners. The sale was completed in June 2019.

In 2022, Life Fitness agreed to sell its Brunswick Billiards business unit to Escalade Sports for $32 million.

== Bowling ==
=== Equipment and products ===
Logo used for Brunswick bowling products

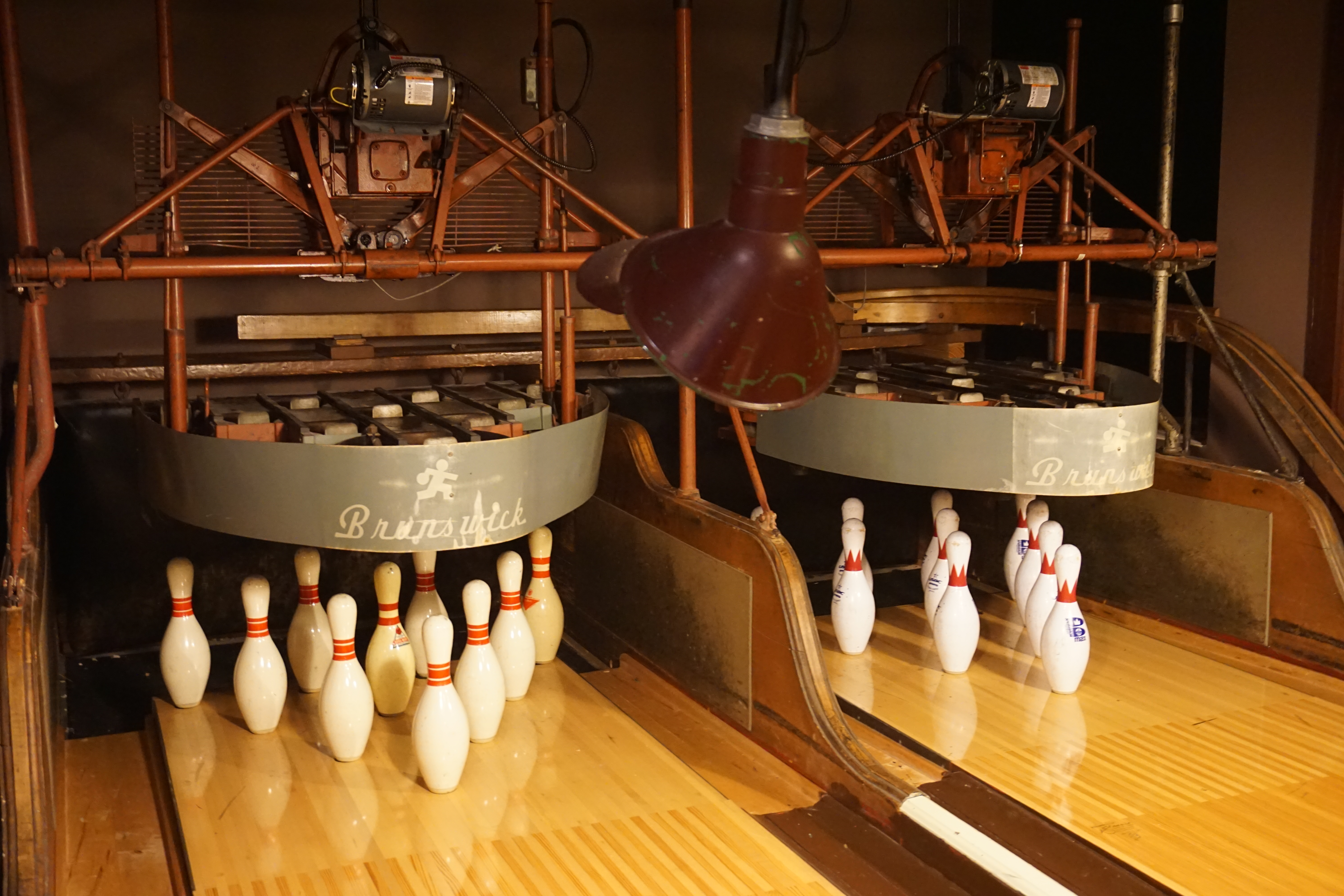
Brunswick semi-automatic pinsetters at the International Bowling Museum and Hall of Fame

Mineralite and other early balls

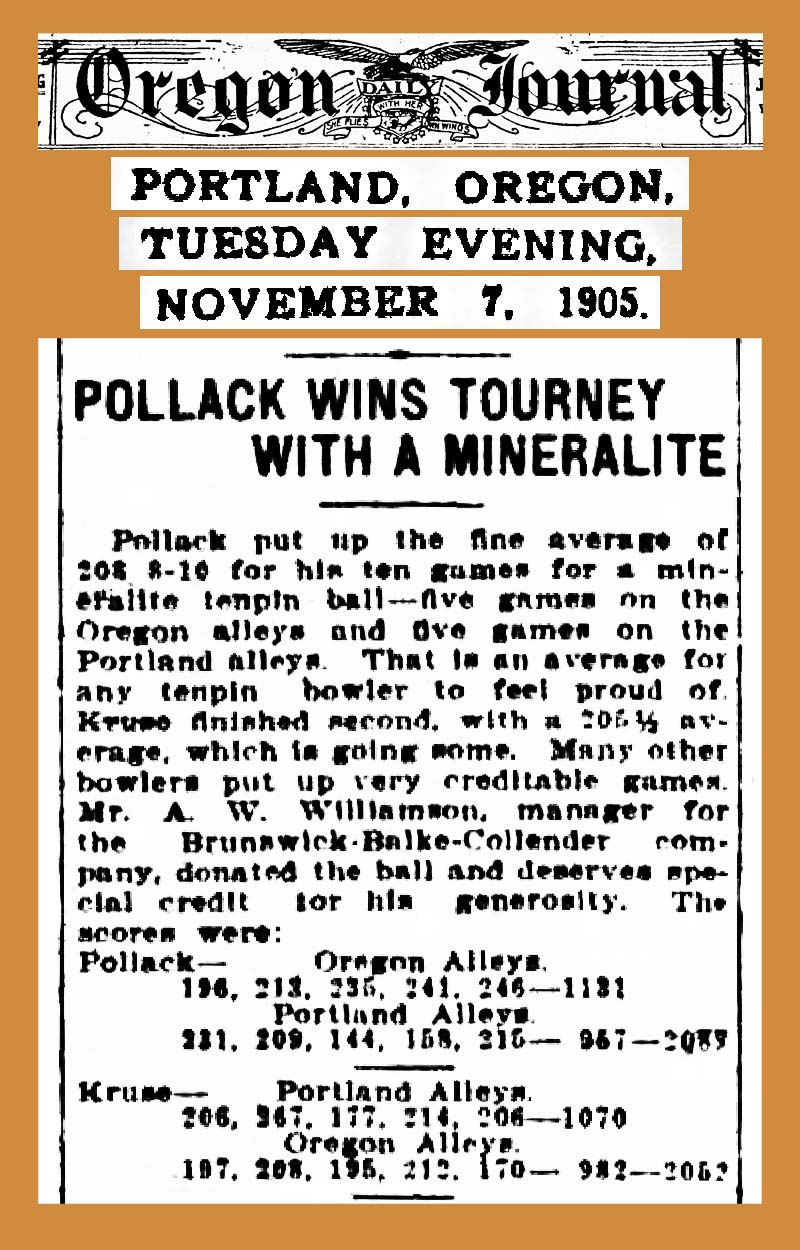
By 1905 the Mineralite ball had been introduced. An Oregon bowler won a tournament using a Mineralite ball that had been given to him.

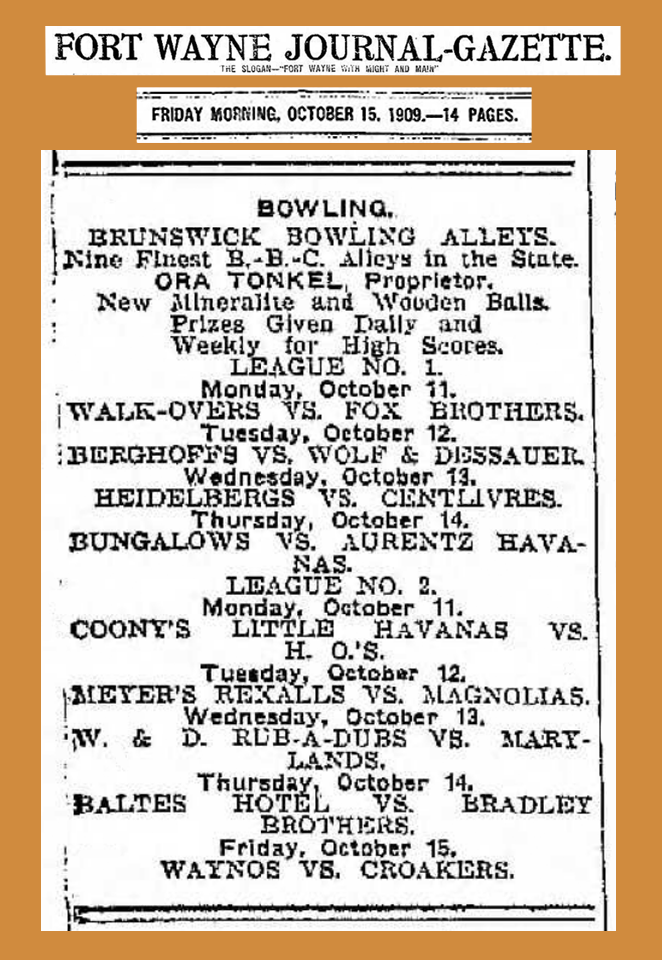
A 1909 newspaper advertisement for a Brunswick bowling alley in Fort Wayne, Indiana, promotes "New Mineralite and wooden balls".

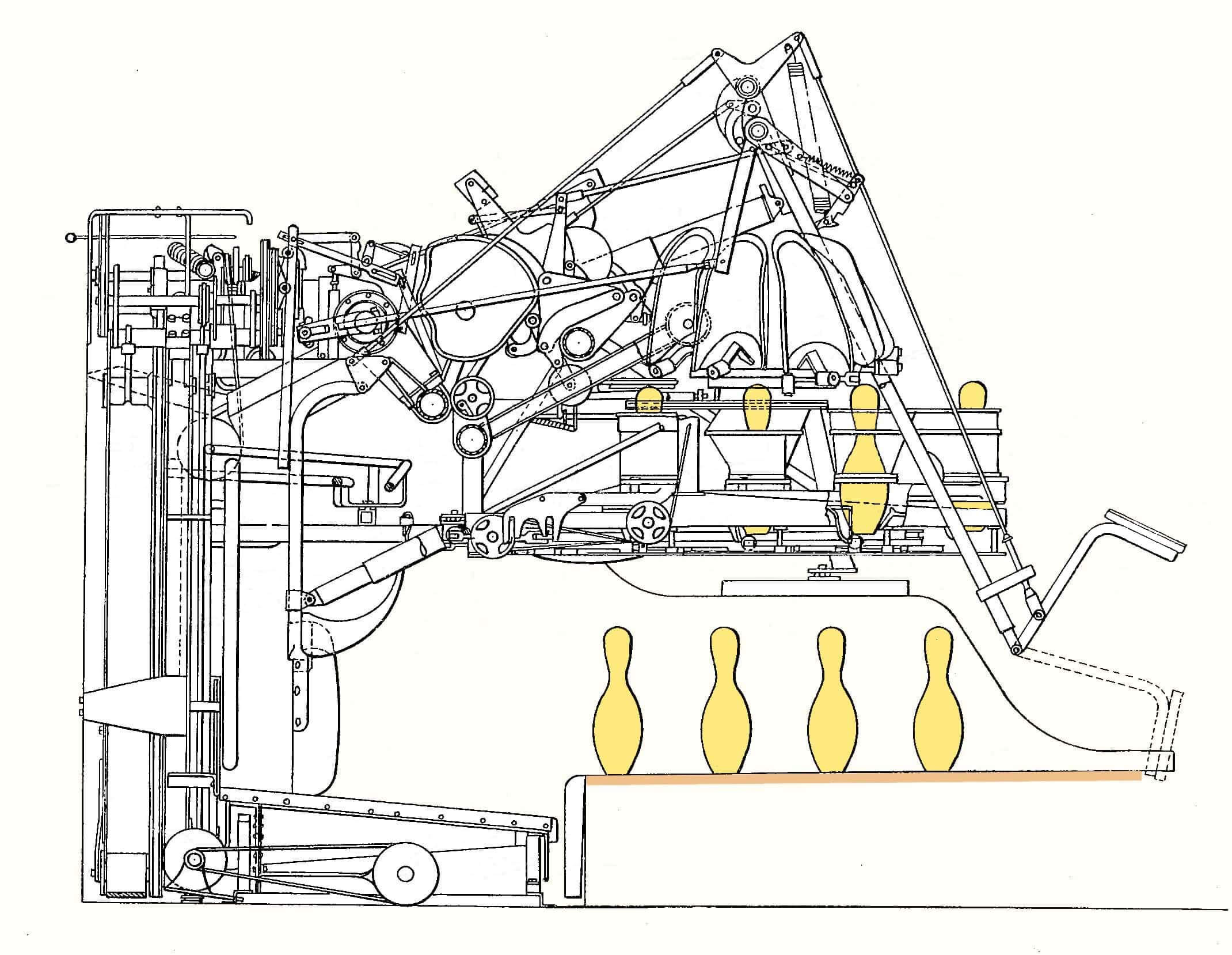
A 1961 US patent for "Automatic Pinsetter" was assigned to Brunswick Automatic Pinsetter Corporation.

Brunswick began production of wooden lanes, bowling balls, and bowling pins in the 1880s as taverns began to install bowling lanes. John Brunswick's son-in-law Moses Bensinger, who was then directing Brunswick's day-to-day operations, actively promoted bowling as a participatory sport and was instrumental in organizing the American Bowling Congress in 1895.

In 1906 Bensinger opened a large manufacturing plant in Muskegon, Michigan. The plant became the cornerstone of the firm's manufacturing, producing such products as the revolutionary $20 Mineralite (hard rubber) bowling ball, and grew to over one million square feet by the 1940s. During World War II, United Service Organizations (USO) centers and military bases eagerly purchased bowling equipment, leading to more than 3,000 bowling lanes being installed at military bases by 1945.

At the time, Brunswick manufactured “spotting tables” which were manually operated to place bowling pins in their proper places on a lane before a bowling ball was thrown at them. The company had toyed with the idea of an automatic pinsetter since 1911, when inventor Ernest Hedenskoog joined the company. Many of his patents provided the basis for the automatic pinsetter later introduced.

It was not until the American Machine and Foundry Company (AMF) introduced the first fully automatic pinsetter in 1952 that Brunswick scrambled to get its own machine to market. In 1954 Brunswick formed the Brunswick-Murray Pinsetter Corporation with Murray Corporation of America, a manufacturer of components for autos and aircraft. By the time Brunswick's “Model A” pinsetters were in full production in 1955, Brunswick had bought out Murray.

Brunswick's policy of selling pinsetters on credit, suburban expansion, and an aggressive advertising campaign all combined to make bowling centers enormously popular in the late 1950s. By the mid-1960s, however, overexpansion led to a period of decline. Brunswick had begun assembling bowling equipment in Dublin in 1959, but it closed its Italian factory in 1966 and the Dublin facility in 1972. Then, in 1973, it entered into a manufacturing joint venture with Fuji Kikai-Hiroshima. In 2005 Brunswick moved its bowling ball production to Reynosa, Mexico, and in 2006 it closed the Muskegon plant.

In 1967 Brunswick introduced the automatic scorer. In 1984, Brunswick acquired the Schmid Company of Scherzenbach, Switzerland, and with it the rights to manufacture and sell its GS pinsetter. The GS is Brunswick's current pinsetter series. The mechanical portion of the pinsetter was originally manufactured in the Brunswick plant located in Stockach, Germany. In 1999 the mechanical manufacturing was relocated to Hungary.

Brunswick completed its exit from the bowling business in May 2015 with the sale of the bowling equipment and products division to BlueArc Capital Management, a private investment firm based in Atlanta, Georgia. BlueArc completed the acquisition with investments from Gladstone Investment Corporation, a publicly traded business development company in McLean, Virginia, and Capitala Finance Corp., a business development company in Charlotte, North Carolina. On November 15, 2019, Brunswick acquired Ebonite International and all of its bowling product brands.

The division's products for bowling centers include capital equipment, such as Sync, a scoring and management system, Spark, an immersive interactive bowling experience, automatic pinsetters, bowling pins, "house" bowling balls, ball returns, lane surfaces, and bowling center furniture, as well as aftermarket products such as pinsetter parts, lane conditioning machines, and conditioners and cleaners for lane machines. The company's current pinsetter model is in the GS Series, but many A Series models remain in active service. Similarly, many centers still use Brunswick AS-80, AS-90, 2000, Classic, Frameworx, Vector, and Vector Plus scoring systems. Brunswick lane surfaces include the Anvilane and Pro Lane brands.

The division's consumer products include its bowling balls, as well as, through licensing arrangements, bowling shoes, bags and accessories. Products have been marketed under the Brunswick, DV8, Radical, Ebonite, Columbia 300, Hammer, and Track brands. In March of 2026, Brunswick dropped the Columbia 300 brand as part of a strategic realignment of its bowling ball portfolio.

Products are manufactured or sourced mainly from facilities located in Michigan and Wisconsin in the United States, as well as in Hungary and Mexico. Bowling products are sold through a direct sales force or distributors in the United States and through distributors in non-U.S. markets.

=== Bowling centers ===
Brunswick
- Type: Division
- Industry: Bowling
- Founded: 1965; 61 years ago
- Defunct: 2015; 11 years ago
- Fate: Acquired by Bowlmor AMF, all locations rebranded by 2020
- Number of locations: 85 (2015)
- Brands: Brunswick; Brunswick Zone; Brunswick Zone XL
- Services: Bowling, laser tag, bumper cars, video game arcades, billiards
- Parent: Brunswick Corporation

Before its acquisition by Bowlmor AMF (now known as Lucky Strike Entertainment Corporation) in October 2014, the Brunswick bowling center division was the second largest operator of bowling centers in the United States, with 88 centers in the US and Canada. Brunswick centers offered bowling and, depending on size and location, in-house restaurants, taverns, outdoor patios, billiards, video and redemption games, laser tag, pro shops, and meeting and party rooms.

In 1965, facing a decline in business after a period of rapid expansion, many privately owned centers found it difficult to pay the bills, and Brunswick took physical possession of 131 of these centers as payment for bowling equipment. In 1966, still suffering from the decline, Brunswick closed many European bowling centers.

In 2007 the company opened its first Brunswick Zone XL centers, large, smoke-free facilities aimed at families, bowling leagues, parties, corporate meetings and group events, offering bowling, laser tag, bumper cars, video game arcades, Brunswick billiards tables, large screen TVs, and spacious meeting rooms.

During 2013 Brunswick Bowling divested its seven remaining European bowling centers.

In July 2014 as part of its exit from the bowling business, Brunswick announced that it had agreed to sell the bowling center business, which brought in $187 million in revenue in the prior year, to its much larger competitor Bowlmor AMF (now known as Lucky Strike Entertainment Corporation, formerly Bowlero Corporation) for $270 million. The sale of the bowling center division to Bowlmor AMF was completed in September 2014.

By January 2020, all remaining Brunswick Zone locations were rebranded with either the Bowlero or AMF names.
