= Columbia 300 =

Columbia 300 may refer to:

- Cessna 350 Corvalis (Columbia 300) light aircraft
- Columbia Industries model 300 bowling ball
