= Track International =

Track was a company involved in the manufacture and sales of bowling balls and ten-pin bowling related accessories. The company was purchased by Columbia Industries and subsequently transferred to Ebonite International of Hopkinsville, Kentucky when the latter acquired the former in February 2007. Track-branded products were then manufactured, under the ownership of Ebonite International, through November 2019.

On November 15, 2019, Ebonite International and all of its brands were purchased by Brunswick Bowling Products, LLC. Track continues to produce bowling balls to the present day as a division of Brunswick.
