= Käyhkö =

Käyhkö is a Finnish surname. Notable people with the surname include:

- Karri Käyhkö (1937–2020), Finnish swimmer
- Kauko Käyhkö (1916–1983), Finnish musician and entertainer
- Tauno Käyhkö (born 1950), Finnish-Canadian ski jumper
- Tomas Käyhkö, Finish bowler
