= Columbia Industries =

American bowling supply company

Columbia Industries was a company involved in the manufacture and sale of bowling balls and ten-pin bowling-related accessories. Their most notable brand name was Columbia 300, which has produced some of the most well-known balls in the sport. Beginning in 1960 in Ephrata, Washington (near the Columbia River), Columbia Industries was the first manufacturer to successfully use polyester resin ("plastic") in bowling balls. Prior to this, nearly all bowling balls were made of a hard rubber material. The company later moved to San Antonio, Texas.

Columbia 300 pro staff members included PBA Tour champions Josh Blanchard and Jakob Butturff, plus PWBA and international champions Clara Guerrero, Sandra Gongora and Missy Parkin. The company also sponsored PBA Hall of Famer Chris Barnes in the earlier part of his long career. PBA and USBC Hall of Famer Glenn Allison bowled his famous 900 series in 1982 using a Columbia 300 Yellow Dot bowling ball.

Columbia Industries purchased the Track and Dyno-Thane bowling ball brands in the early 2000s. In February 2007, Columbia announced that all of its brands had been acquired by Ebonite International. From February 2007 through November 2019, all Columbia Industries-related products were manufactured and owned by Ebonite International of Hopkinsville, Kentucky. On November 15, 2019, Ebonite International and all of its brands were subsequently purchased by Brunswick Bowling Products, LLC. Columbia 300-branded bowling balls were manufactured in Brunswick plants run by BlueArc Capital Management as part of the merger.

On March 10, 2026, Brunswick announced the retirement of the Columbia 300 brand as part of a strategic realignment of the company's portfolio.
