= David Krol =

American ten-pin bowler

Personal information
- Born: December 17, 1995 (age 30) Nixa, Missouri, U.S.

Bowling Information
- Affiliation: PBA
- Dominant hand: Right (two-hand delivery)
- Wins: 3 PBA Tour (1 major); 3 PBA Regional Tour; 1 international title
- Sponsors: Hammer, VISE Grips

David "Boog" Krol (born December 17, 1995) is an American professional ten-pin bowler from Nixa, Missouri. A member of the Professional Bowlers Association (PBA), he is known for winning the 2024 PBA Playoffs and the 2026 USBC Masters. He has won three PBA Tour titles overall, including one major, in addition to three PBA Regional Tour titles. He uses the two-handed shovel style delivery with a dominant right hand.

Krol is sponsored by Hammer Bowling and VISE grips.

== Early years ==
Krol was a three-time Missouri high school bowling champion. He went on to compete in amateur tournaments after high school, eventually becoming a PBA member in 2016.

== Professional bowling career ==
Krol attempted to bowl full-time on the PBA Tour for three seasons (2017 through 2019) with little success. He made it out of the pre-tournament qualifier (PTQ) round to cash eleven times over those three seasons with eight match play appearances, but he did not make any appearances in the championship round (the final round of a tournament which usually consists of the top five players from match play). He cut back to mostly PBA Regional Tour play over the next three seasons, committing himself to a rigorous practice schedule beginning in the COVID-shortened 2020 season.

In 2022, Krol finished fourth in the PBA Regional Players Invitational, earning $5,000 and some confidence to attempt bowling full-time again in the 2023 PBA Tour season. His season highlights included a match play appearance at the PBA Wichita Classic, during which he rolled 31 consecutive strikes in qualifying. However, he again failed to make a championship round appearance and did not earn enough points to qualify for the priority field in 2024.

2024 found Krol again bowling in PTQ rounds, a seven-game qualifying round that non-priority players must bowl just for a chance to make the initial field. He finished 15th in the PBA Players Championship and just missed the championship round at the U.S. Open, finishing sixth. He finally broke through with his first championship round appearance in the PBA Delaware Classic, qualifying as the #2 seed for the March 3 telecast. He defeated 14-time PBA Tour titlist Bill O'Neill in the semifinal match, then defeated Finland’s Tomas Käyhkö in the final match to earn his first PBA Tour title. Having a PBA Tour title gave Krol priority entry for the remainder of the season, meaning he no longer had to bowl in PTQ rounds.

On the strength of his first title and other high finishes, Krol qualified as the #9 seed for the 2024 PBA Playoffs, a post-season event featuring the top 16 players in points over the 14-event regular season. He knocked off top seed E. J. Tackett in the quarterfinal round and again victimized Bill O'Neill (the #4 seed) in the semifinal round. He went on to face #10 seed and 11-time PBA Tour titlist Jesper Svensson in the race-to-two-points final match on May 19. After splitting two games with Svensson, Krol earned the win with a 48–40 triumph in the ninth/tenth frame roll-off. For his victory, he earned his second PBA Tour title, $75,000 and a custom WWE belt (awarded because Fox network carried both WWE wrestling and PBA bowling). He also locked up an exemption for the 2025 PBA Tour. For the 2024 season, Krol finished 9th overall in Tour points and cashed $128,200.

On March 22, 2025, Krol made his first appearance in the televised finals of a major event, qualifying fourth for the PBA World Championship. He was defeated in the opening match by fifth-seeded BJ Moore.

Krol qualified as the top seed at the 2026 PBA Indiana Classic, but lost his lone match in the March 22 televised championship to Marshall Kent. On a beat-up 39-foot oil pattern, Krol bowled 136 to Kent's 152 in the lowest-scoring televised final match in PBA history. He would rebound the very next week in the USBC Masters. From a field of 390 bowlers, he qualified as the #5 seed for the televised finals. He defeated Matt Sanders, Jesper Svensson and Eric Jones to advance to the championship match. Krol then defeated reigning PBA Player of the Year E. J. Tackett by a single pin, 196–195, for his third PBA Tour title and first major title. He finished seventh on the 2026 PBA Tour points list, and fifth in earnings with $145,100.

On September 7, 2026, Krol won the Samho Korea Cup International Open, a non-PBA event held in Yongin, South Korea. The tournament had 400 bowler entries from 17 countries. In the final match, Krol defeated Mexico's Arturo Quintero, 237–197, to earn the first-place prize of 60 million Won (approximately $44,500 USD).

Krol has also won three PBA Regional Tour titles. On the way to one of these titles in September 2023, he averaged 259 over 16 games and rolled four perfect 300 games during the event.

=== PBA Tour titles ===
Major championships are in bold text.

1. 2024: PBA Delaware Classic (Middletown, Delaware)
2. 2024: PBA Playoffs (Arlington, Washington & Kissimmee, Florida)
3. **2026: USBC Masters** (Allen Park, Michigan)

=== Other professional titles ===
1. 2026: Samho Korea Cup International Open (Yongin, South Korea)

== Personal ==
Krol says he got the nickname "Boog" from his mother, who "called me a cute little booger." He is friends with Springfield, Missouri native and PBA Tour titlist Keven Williams, with whom he has also roomed on tour. He married Hazel Plaster-Krol in 2023.
