= Ebonite International =

Former American bowling equipment manufacturer

Ebonite International was a parent company that oversaw the manufacture of bowling balls and bowling equipment. Their headquarters and primary manufacturing facility was located in Hopkinsville, Kentucky before closing on November 15, 2019.

The manufacturing plant now houses the CtD Education Center, owned by Ronald Hickland Jr., a former Ebonite ball core designer.

== Expansion in 2007 ==
In addition to Ebonite-branded bowling balls, Ebonite International also owned the Hammer-branded line of balls since 2002. In February 2007, Ebonite announced that it had acquired one of the industry's leading manufacturers, Columbia Industries, makers of the Columbia 300 line of bowling balls. That acquisition also resulted in Ebonite gaining control of Dynothane Inc., which produced Dyno-Thane and Track bowling balls, because Dynothane Inc. had been previously purchased by Columbia.

== Acquisition by Brunswick ==
On November 15, 2019, the company announced that its assets and patents had been sold to Brunswick Bowling Products, LLC. However, the purchase agreement did not include the Hopkinsville manufacturing plant, and it was subsequently closed. As of late 2019, Brunswick announced they would continue to produce the four EBI brands (Ebonite, Hammer, Columbia 300 and Track) in its own manufacturing plants.

== Brands ==
Ebonite has marketed bowling balls and other ten-pin bowling equipment under several brand names:

- Ebonite
- Hammer
- Columbia 300
- Track
- Robby's
- Powerhouse
