= Robert Smith (bowler) =

American bowler

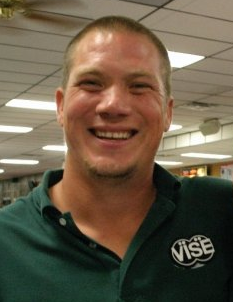

Personal information
- Born: January 16, 1974 (age 52) Simi Valley, California, U.S.
- Years active: 1991−present
- Height: 6 ft 0 in (183 cm)

Bowling Information
- Affiliation: PBA
- Dominant hand: Right
- Wins: 7 PBA Tour (1 major); 10 PBA Regional Tour; 1 international
- 300-games: 31
- Sponsors: Hammer Bowling

Robert Smith (born January 16, 1974), is an American professional bowler known for his years on the Professional Bowlers Association (PBA) Tour. A native of Simi Valley, California, Smith has also held residence in Captain Cook, Hawaii, Columbus, Ohio, and Hong Kong. Currently, he resides and works near his home town in Ventura, California.

Smith's career on the PBA tour was marred by numerous injuries, resulting in many withdrawals from high-profile tournaments. Despite this, he amassed seven tour titles during his career, with his first being his lone major victory at the 2000 U.S. Open. He won a second title later in the 2000 season. His only other season with multiple Tour wins was 2003–04.

In his prime, Smith was considered the world's most powerful one-handed bowler. Smith's ball roll has been tracked as high as 27 revolutions per shot and traveling at up to 34 miles per hour (55 km/h) - the average professional achieves about 16 revolutions per shot, traveling at 18 miles per hour (29 km/h). This high rev-rate (from about 550-600 RPM on average and up to 720 RPM tops) is more than most bowlers have been able to produce. Based on this characteristic, he was known on tour as "Maximum Bob."

Smith joined the PBA50 Tour (for players 50 and over) in 2024. He is currently sponsored by Hammer Bowling.

== Career titles ==
Major titles are in bold text.

Season	Event	Location
2000	**Bowling's U.S. Open Presented By AMF**	Phoenix, Arizona
2000	Flagship Open	Erie, Pennsylvania
2001–02	PBA Empire State Open	Latham, New York
2002–03	Oranamin C Japan Cup	Tokyo, Japan
2003–04	PBA Banquet Open	Council Bluffs, Iowa
2003–04	PBA Odor-Eaters Open	Tucson, Arizona
2007–08	CLR Windy City Classic	Vernon Hills, Illinois
2010–11	8th Euro-Med Storm Int'l Masters Challenge	Manila, Philippines

== Other achievements and recognition ==
- Smith won the USBC 1992 Chuck Hall Star of Tomorrow Award
- Became the youngest person to win the U.S. Amateur Championship - aged 19 - in 1993.
- Member of Team USA in 1994 and 1995.
- Named the first team Collegiate All-American at San Diego State University in 1993
- Owns ten PBA Regional Tour titles

== Trivia ==
- In the 2000 U.S. Open, Robert Smith became the first player in the history of the sport to have won both U.S. Amateur and U.S. Open titles.
- Smith made at least one TV finals appearance in each of his first 12 full seasons on tour.
- He has 31 career 300 games in PBA competition.
- Smith bowls league at Buena Lanes in Ventura, California where he shot back to back 300 games in 2019 with a plastic bowling ball.
