= PBA Women's Series =

The PBA Women's Series was a mini-tour for female professional bowlers. It was started in 2007 as a way to bring women's bowling back to television after the Professional Women's Bowling Association (PWBA) disbanded in 2003. Sponsored by the United States Bowling Congress (USBC) and its website bowl.com, it ran concurrently with several stops on the Professional Bowlers Association's men's tour.

After the PWBA folded, female bowlers have had very few national venues in which to bowl, other than the USBC Queens event. A few female bowlers, including Carolyn Dorin-Ballard, Liz Johnson and Kelly Kulick, began competing on the "men's" PBA Tour with limited success. The U.S. Women's Open was resurrected by the USBC in 2007, and it also spawned the creation of the women's series. A four-event trial series was run during the early weeks of the 2007-08 PBA season. The series was expanded to eight events in each of the 2008–09 and 2009–10 seasons, but was not continued into the 2010–11 season.

== 2007 Women's Series ==
The trial PBA Women's Series featured four events during the first six weeks of the 2007-08 PBA season.

=== 2007 Women's Series Results ===
Finals Air Date	Event	Location	Winner
November 4, 2007	Motor City Classic	Taylor, Michigan	Carolyn Dorin-Ballard
November 11, 2007	Etonic Championship	Cheektowaga, New York	Shannon Pluhowsky
November 18, 2007	Lake County Indiana Classic	Merrillville, Indiana	Joy Esterson
December 2, 2007	Great Lakes Classic	Wyoming, Michigan	Diandra Asbaty

== 2008–09 Women's Series ==
The PBA Women's Series continued in the 2008–09 season with seven events. The 2008–09 format was similar to that used in 2007–08, with two televised finalists advancing from a field of sixteen qualifiers in five of the events. One event featured a qualifying round of 32, with the top two advancing. The final televised event was a mixed doubles tournament, where 16 Women's Series bowlers were paired with 16 male PBA bowlers following separate qualifying rounds for each. The top five doubles teams competed in a "Baker style" stepladder final (male and female bowlers alternate frames during each game).

=== 2008–09 Women's Series Participants and Results ===
The four 2007 Women's Series winners were automatically entered into the qualifying field for each week of the 2008–09 series. Complementing them were twelve entrants from the PBA Women's Series Trials that were held in conjunction with the U.S. Women's Open. The 2008 U.S. Women's Open took place July 31–August 6 at Brunswick Zone XL Lanes in Romeoville, IL, where Kim Terrell-Kearney was crowned U.S. Women's Open champion. (Terrell-Kearney, busy with a coaching career, declined the opportunity to compete in the Women's Series.)

While the U.S. Women's Open itself required a $250 entry fee, those who wanted a chance to qualify for the PBA Women's Series had to pay an additional $750. Those who qualified were also required to become PBA members, if they were not already.

The results for the 2008–09 PBA Women's Series were as follows:

Finals Air Date	Event	Location	Winner
November 2, 2008	Pepsi Viper Championship	Omaha, Nebraska	Stefanie Nation
November 16, 2008	Chameleon Championship	Taylor, Michigan	Michelle Feldman
November 30, 2008	CLR Carmen Salvino Scorpion Championship	Vernon Hills, Illinois	Michelle Feldman
December 7, 2008	Cheetah Championship	Cheektowaga, New York	Carolyn Dorin-Ballard
December 14, 2008	Lumber Liquidators Shark Championship	Baltimore, Maryland	Jodi Woessner
January 18, 2009	Bayer Earl Anthony Medford Championship	Medford, Oregon	Wendy Macpherson+
February 1, 2009	Don and Paula Carter Mixed Doubles Championship	Reno, Nevada	Liz Johnson & Norm Duke
April 12, 2009	PBA Women's Series Showdown	Orlando, Florida	Carolyn Dorin-Ballard

+Made field of 16 as an alternate.

== 2009-10 Women's Series ==
The 2009–10 PBA Women's Series Tour Trials were held in conjunction with the Women's U.S. Open, August 3–9 in Las Vegas, NV. The PBA announced that the fields for at least the first five 2009–10 PBA Women's Series events (all held August 15–September 4 at the PBA World Series of Bowling in Allen Park, MI) would increase from 16 to 20. Two additional spots were up for grabs at the women's Tour Trials, while the other two come from a Tour Qualifying Round (TQR) in each event.

Each event at the World Series of Bowling had the final round taped September 5–6 for ESPN broadcasts in October–December, 2009. This included the finals for the Women's PBA World Championship event, broadcast October 25, 2009 in conjunction with the finals of the Senior PBA World Championship.

The PBA Women's Series continued into 2010 with the Don and Paula Carter Mixed Doubles event, the Earl Anthony Memorial and the PBA Women's Series Showdown.

=== 2009–10 Women's Series Results ===
The results for the 2009–10 PBA Women's Series were as follows:

Finals Air Date	Event	Location	Winner
October 25, 2009	PBA Women's World Championship	Allen Park, Michigan	Kelly Kulick
November 15, 2009	Viper Championship	Allen Park, Michigan	Liz Johnson
November 22, 2009	Chameleon Championship	Allen Park, Michigan	Shannon Pluhowsky
November 29, 2009	Scorpion Championship	Allen Park, Michigan	Shannon Pluhowsky
December 6, 2009	Shark Championship	Allen Park, Michigan	Kelly Kulick
January 17, 2010	Earl Anthony Memorial	Dublin, California	Stefanie Nation
February 21, 2010	Bayer Don and Paula Carter Mixed Doubles	Wheat Ridge, Colorado	Diandra Asbaty & Brian Voss
April 18, 2010	PBA Women's Series Showdown	Arlington, Texas	Michelle Feldman
