= Hammer Bowling =

American bowling equipment manufacturer

Hammer Bowling is a company involved in the manufacture and sale of bowling balls and bowling-related products and accessories.

== History ==
=== Faball Era ===
Hammer begins as a ball line from Faball Enterprises and early 80's urethane ball called the Hammer, not as a company originally named the Hammer Bowling Company. Faball Enterprises was founded in 1978 by Johnny Wonders and Earl Widman. In 81 they developed a ball called the Hammer because of its strong striking power. This ball sparked the launch of the Hammer identity.

The original Hammer bowling ball arrived during a major period of technical advancement in bowling. The recently created Urethane coverstock allowed bowlers a newer and stronger reaction down the lane compared to older materials. It could create more friction and stronger pin action thanks to the greater control it gave.

The first Hammer logo was also significant as a piece of recognizable branding. Faball included the highly visible claw Hammer logo on the side of the ball. Sources credit Hammer as the first brand to have a visible logo on the ball's side. This made the Hammer more recognizable on PBA television appearances and a more memorable brand.

=== Technical Legacy ===
Hammer's early reputation was built on Urethane technology. Sources often credit Hammer as the first two-piece urethane bowling ball, a development that established Hammer as more than just a novelty brand.

Released in 1997, the 3D Offset was the first asymmetric core bowling ball on the market. This allowed for more ball flare and a more dynamic lane shape than balls released before. This asymmetric idea continued through Hammer's history, even to today.

=== From Faball to Ebonite ===
In 1996, Faball Enterprises licensed the Hammer name to Faball USA. Faball USA managed the brand until February 8, 2002, when Ebonite International Acquired Hammer.

Under Ebonite International, Hammer became on of several major bowling equipment brands. Its products were manufactured at Ebonite's facility in Hopkinsville, Kentucky, as the brand offered bowling balls across multiple market segments, from entry level to high performance balls.

This ownership period allowed Hammer to move beyond its Urethane identity. The company continues to benefit from its urethane sales, but now produces reactive and hybrid balls meant for modern-day conditions and competitive players.

=== The Introduction of the Black Widow ===
In June of 2006, Hammer blew up the market with the release of its newest bowling ball, the Black Widow. The original Black Widow used a newly created asymmetrical core called the "Gas Mask" core. It became the company's signature high performance ball line.

The Black Widow line featured a red and black spider logo. Hammer also promoted the balls for their hook potential and pin action.

By 2024, 22 Black Widow balls were released in the United States, along with additional overseas-exclusive releases.

=== The Purple Hammer and Return of Urethane ===
Despite newfound success in reactive balls, Hammer never gave up on creating Urethane bowling balls. The most important modern urethane product from Hammer is often considered the Purple Hammer, which allowed for a smoother, more controlled reaction on challenging lane conditions.

The Purple Hammer also became the subject of a major USBC equipment controversy in 2022. The USBC investigated a set of Purple Hammer balls made at the Hopkinsville plant from 2016-2017. These balls appeared to have been produces below the minimum hardness of 72D.

The tests came out inconclusive, but despite this, the USBC decided to place a ban on all Purple Hammer bowling balls manufactured between 2016 and 2017 in all USBC national tournaments, mainly identified by the serial number on the ball beginning with a 6 or a 7.

This rule did not mean that all Purple Hammers were banned. The USBC specified that individual competitions could chose to adopt the national rule or not.

=== From Ebonite to Brunswick ===
On November 15, 2019, Brunswick Bowling Products acquired Ebonite International's assets. This included Hammer, Ebonite, Colombia 300, and Track bowling brands along with the rest of Ebonite's trademarks and technologies.

Brunswick announced it would continue to market the products under the acquired brands and honor the warranties on existing Ebonite balls.

=== Hammer Today ===
Hammer remains one of the most popular Brunswick Bowling brands. Its official product catalogue currently includes several product tiers:

- High-Performance balls: Spawn, Full Effect, Zero Mercy Solid/Pearl, Maximum Effect, the 3-D Offset Assault, and the Hammer Effect Tour.
- Upper-Mid Performance balls: Black widow 3.0 and 3.0 Dynasty, Black Widow Tour v1, the Black Widow Mania, and the Black Widow 2.0.
- Mid-Performance: Purple Pearl Urethane 78D, Black Pearl Urethane, Purple Pearl Urethane, and the Nu Blue Hammer.
- Lower-Mid Performance: All RAW hammer balls.
- Spare balls: All Hammer AXE balls.
- Bags, Shoes, Accessories, and a variety of apparel.

=== Timeline ===
Year	Milestone
1978	Founding of Faball Enterprises by Jonny Wonders and Earl Widman.
1981	Development of the first Hammer bowling ball.
Early 80's	The claw-Hammer logo appears on a televised game spiking the ball's popularity.
1996	Faball Licenses Hammer to Faball USA
2002	Ebonite International Acquires Hammer
2006	Hammer releases the first Black Widow using the new Gas Mask core.
20019	Brunswick acquires Ebonite and allows Hammer to continue its legacy.
2020's-Present	Hammer continues with production of its bowling balls and bowling related products.

== Hammer Sponsored "Staffer" Players ==
=== National ===
Current Men's Staff
Name	Join year
Christian Azconza	Unknown
Adam Barta	2000
Deo Benard	Unknown
Dino Castillo	Unknown
Tom Daugherty	2016
Gary Haines	Unknown
Eric Jones	2024
Tyrell Ingalls	Unknown
Rudy Kasmakis	2024
Tomas Käyhkö	Unknown
Marshall Kent	2023
Alec Keplinger	Unknown
Dan Knowlton	2021
David "Boog" Krol	Unknown
Anthony Lavery-Saphr	Unknown
Troy Lint	Unknown
Shawn Maldonado	2019
Anthony Neuer	2021
Bill O'Neill	2009
Ronnie Russell	2019
Ryan Shafer	Unknown
Robert Smith	2024
Hayden Stgippich	2026
Nate Stubler	2026
Richie Teece	2026
Zach Weidman	2020
Zach Wilkins	2025
Mike Wolfe	2016

Current Women's Staff
Name	Join Year
Correen Acuff	Unknown
Marissa Allison	Unknown
Sydney Brummett	Unknown
Sandra Góngora	Unknown
Chelsey Klingler	Unknown
Shannon Pluhowsky	2016
Rocío Restrepo	2026
Alexis Runk	Unknown
Lauren Russo	Unknown
Kerry Smith	2019
Kelly Whipple	Unknown
Stephanie Zavala	2026

=== International ===
Current International Staff
Name	Gender	Country	Join Year
Bernice Lim	Female	Singapore	Unknown
Darren Ong	Male	Singapore	Unknown
Mike Ong Jing Loong	Male	Singapore	Unknown
