= Bowling Digest =

Sports periodical

Bowling Digest was a Ten-pin bowling magazine. It was published from 1983 to 2005. Jeri Edwards was the editor of the magazine between 1993 and 2000. The magazine published four times per year. The publisher was the Century Publishing Co. The headquarters was in Evanston, Illinois.
