= Tomas Käyhkö =

Finnish ten-pin bowler

Tomas Käyhkö is a Finnish professional ten-pin bowler. He uses a two-handed shovel-style delivery with a dominant right hand.

In 2019, he won silver in pairs with Niko Oksanen at the European Championships. In his first World Championships in 2021, he won silver in singles.

In 2020, he was chosen as the bowler of the year in Finland. At that time, his achievements included winning the Finnish Masters and the Finnish doubles championship. Käyhkö represents Varkaus Mainarit. In the opening event of the 2023 PBA Tour season, the U.S. Open major, Tomas qualified as the #2 seed and finished third in the February 5 final round.

Käyhkö has a pair of second-place finishes on the PBA Tour. He earned the top seed in the 2024 PBA Delaware Classic, but lost the March 3 final match to David Krol. He made it to the final match of the 2026 Storm Lucky Larsen Masters, but lost to England's Raymond Teece.

Käyhkö is sponsored by Hammer Bowling and Turbo finger inserts.
