= Bowling ball =

Ball used to hit pins in the sport of bowling

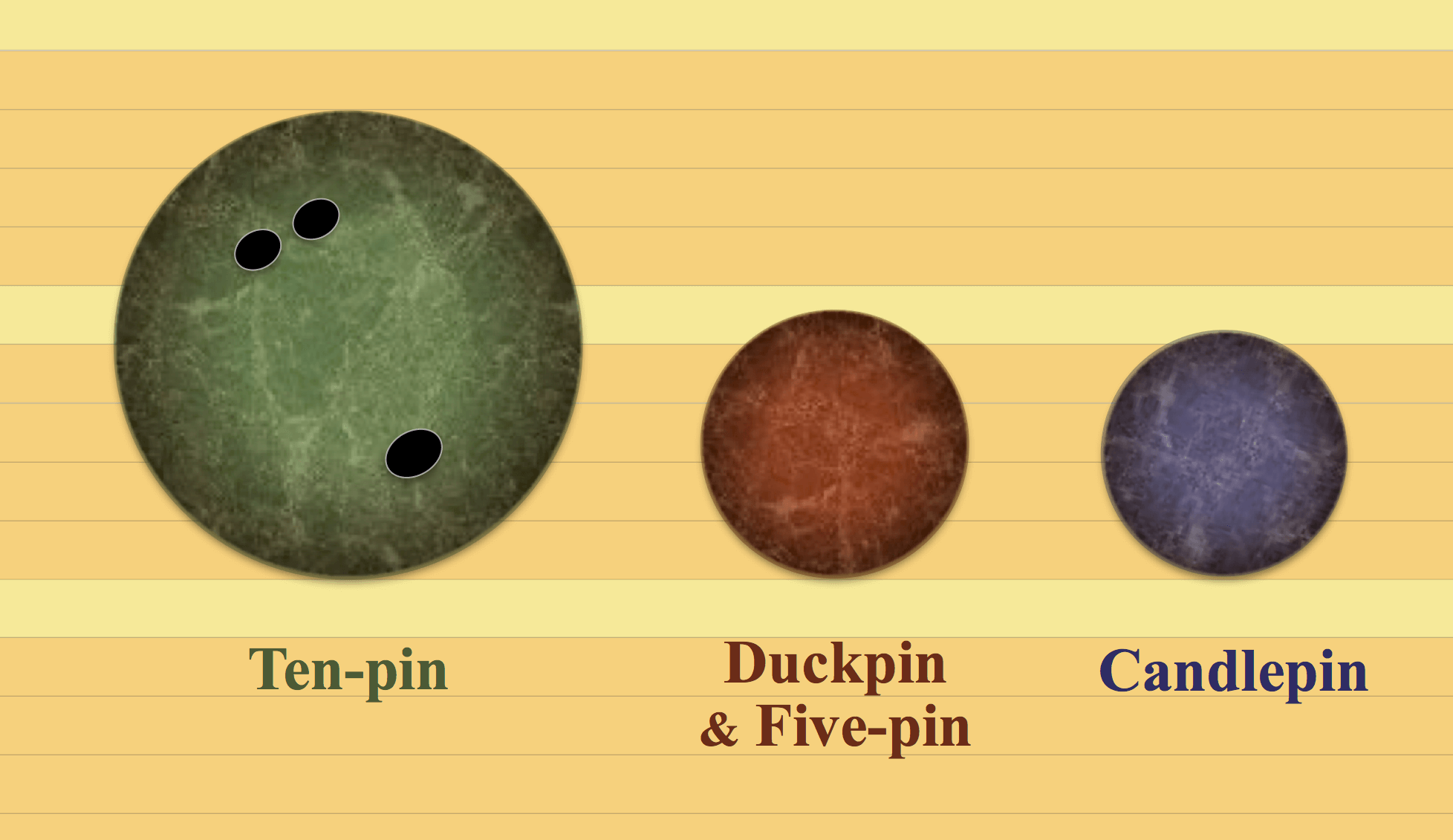
Comparative sizes of bowling balls, portrayed on boards of a bowling lane

A bowling ball is a hard spherical ball used to knock down bowling pins in the sport of bowling.

Balls used in tenpin bowling and nine-pin bowling traditionally have holes for two fingers and the thumb. Balls used in five-pin bowling, candlepin bowling, duckpin bowling, and European nine-pin bowling have no holes, and are small enough to be held in the palm of the hand.

== Tenpin balls ==
=== Specifications ===
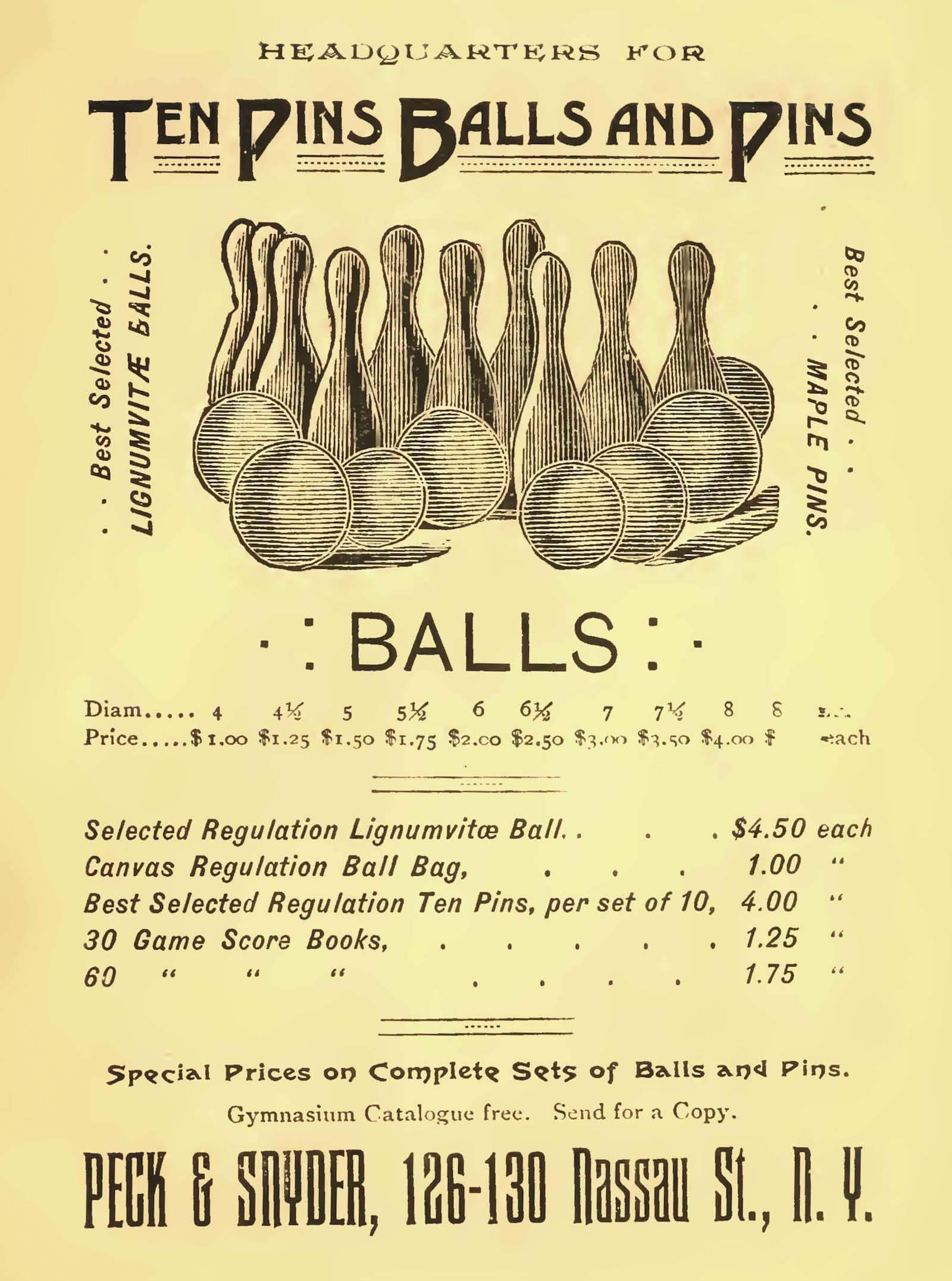
This 1892 ad shows Lignum vitae (hardwood) balls of various sizes.

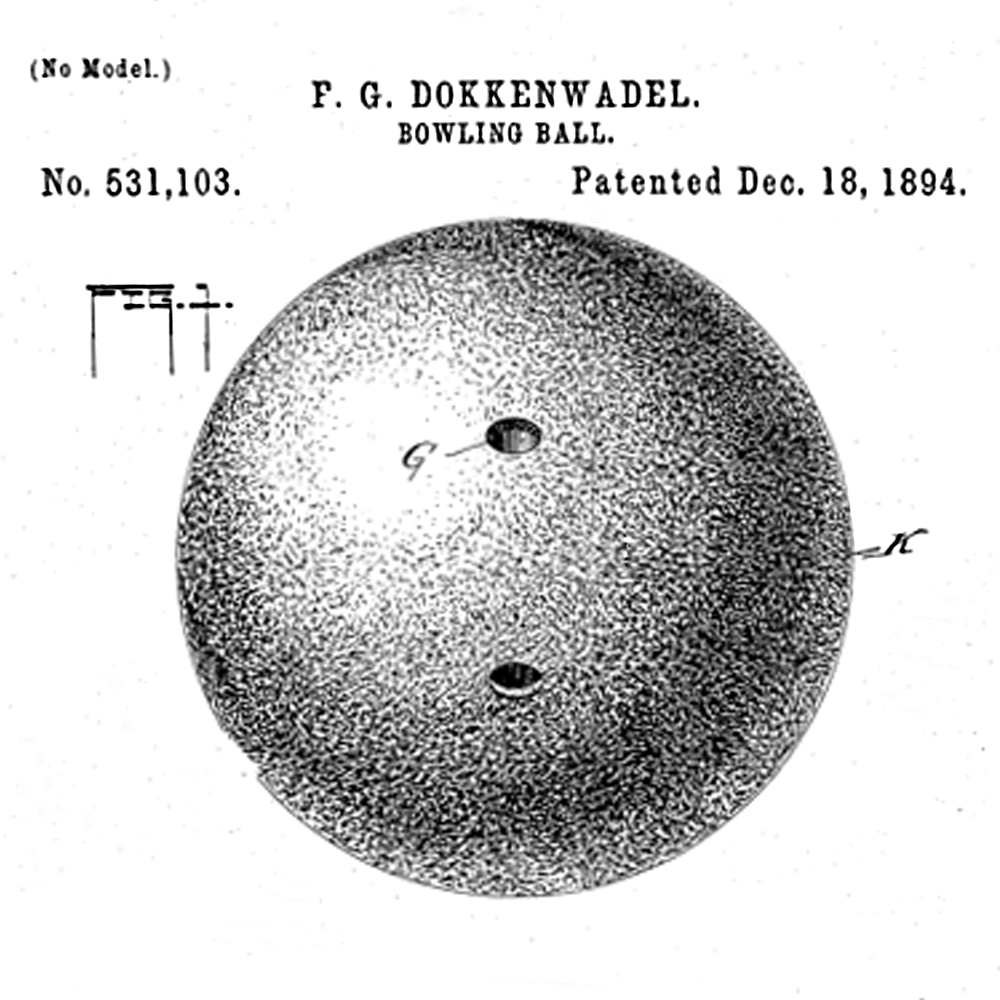
This 1894 patent shows how bowling balls once had a thumb hole and only a single finger hole. Bowling balls of the era were made of lignum vitae (hardwood).

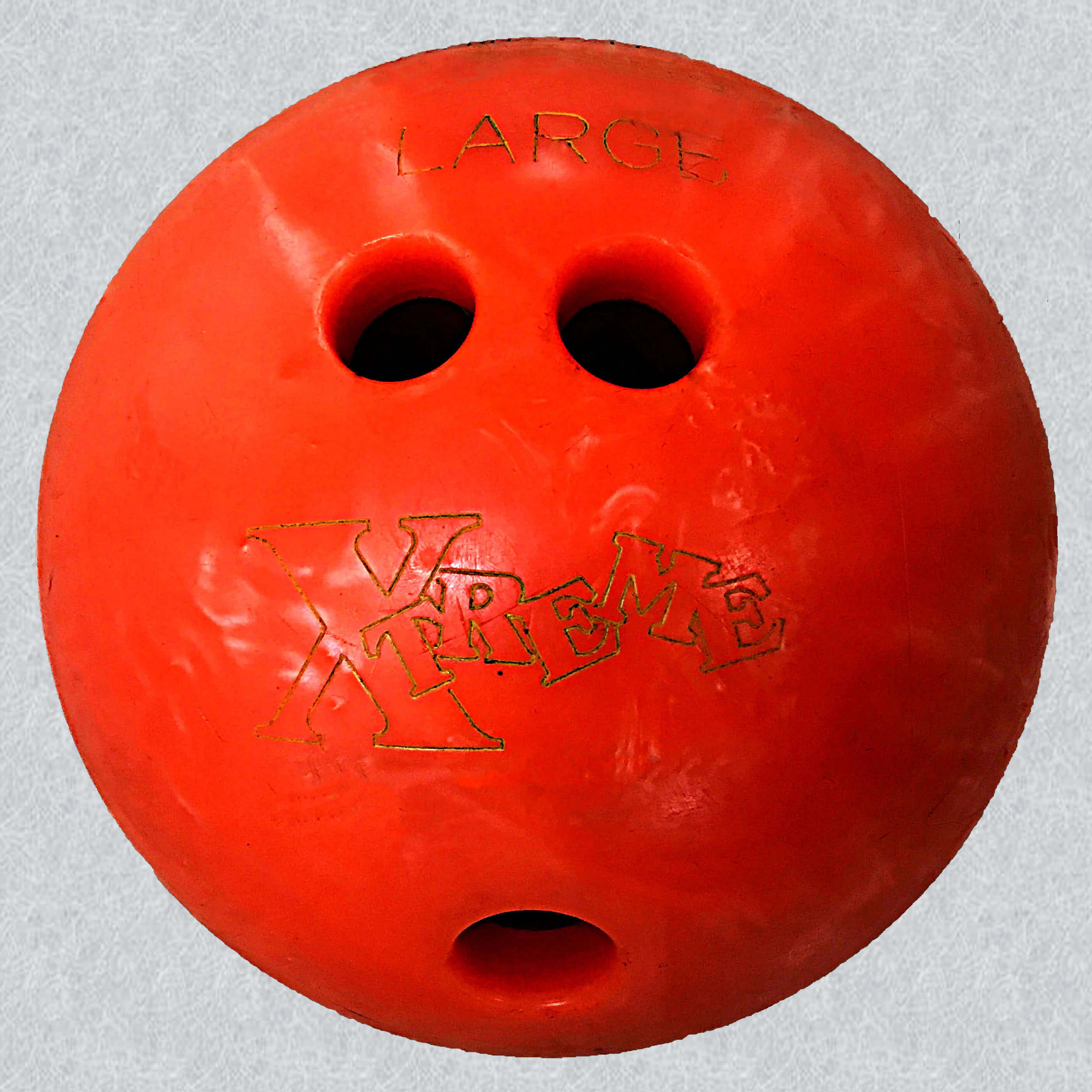
A polyester ("plastic") house ball, having large, non-custom holes in a conventional grip (fingers insert to the second knuckle; thumb hole relatively close to the finger holes)

Balls with custom finger inserts in a fingertip grip
(fingers insert only to first knuckle)

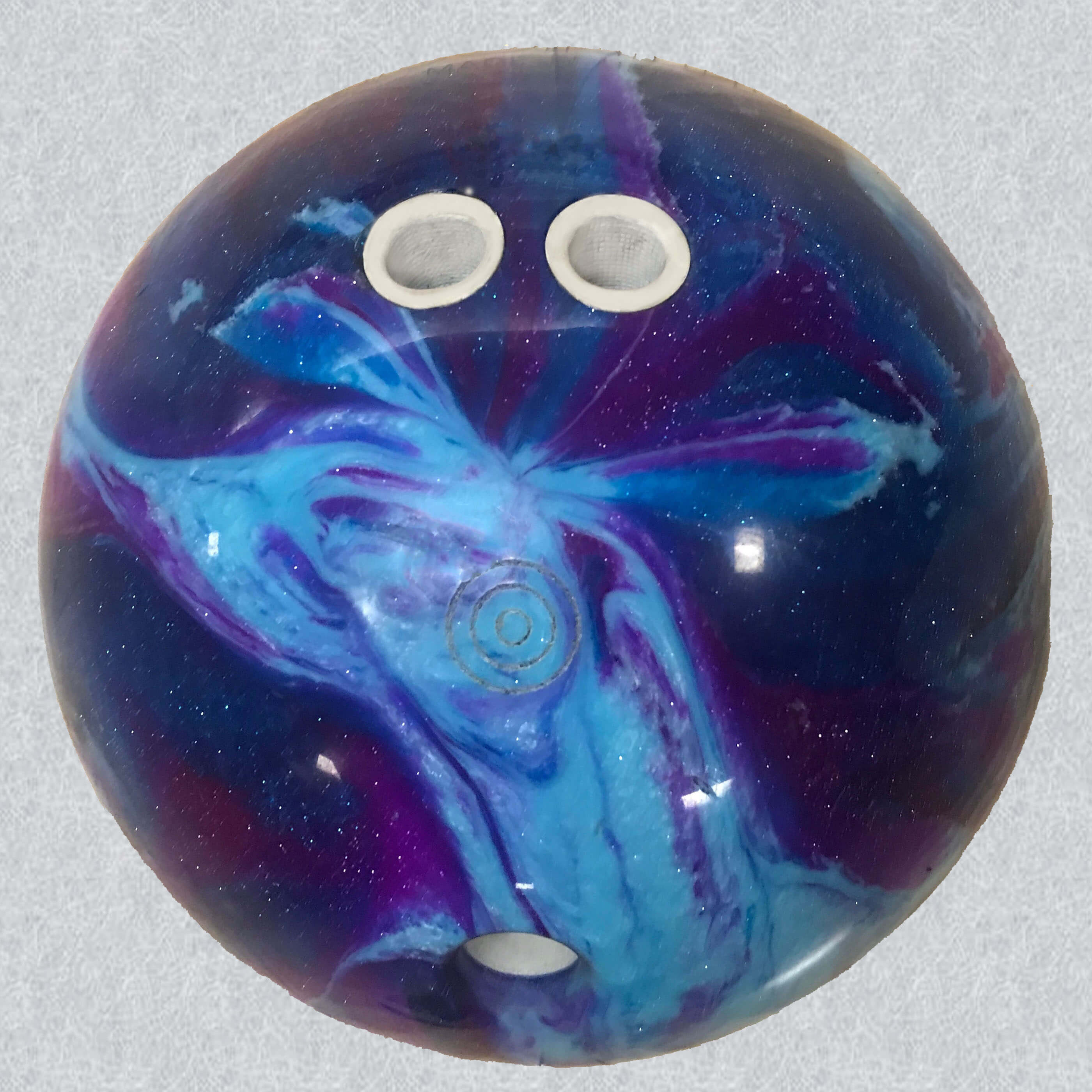
A polyester ("plastic") ball. Pin location is between finger holes and thumb hole (pin down layout). Ball is used as a "straight ball" for some spare shots.

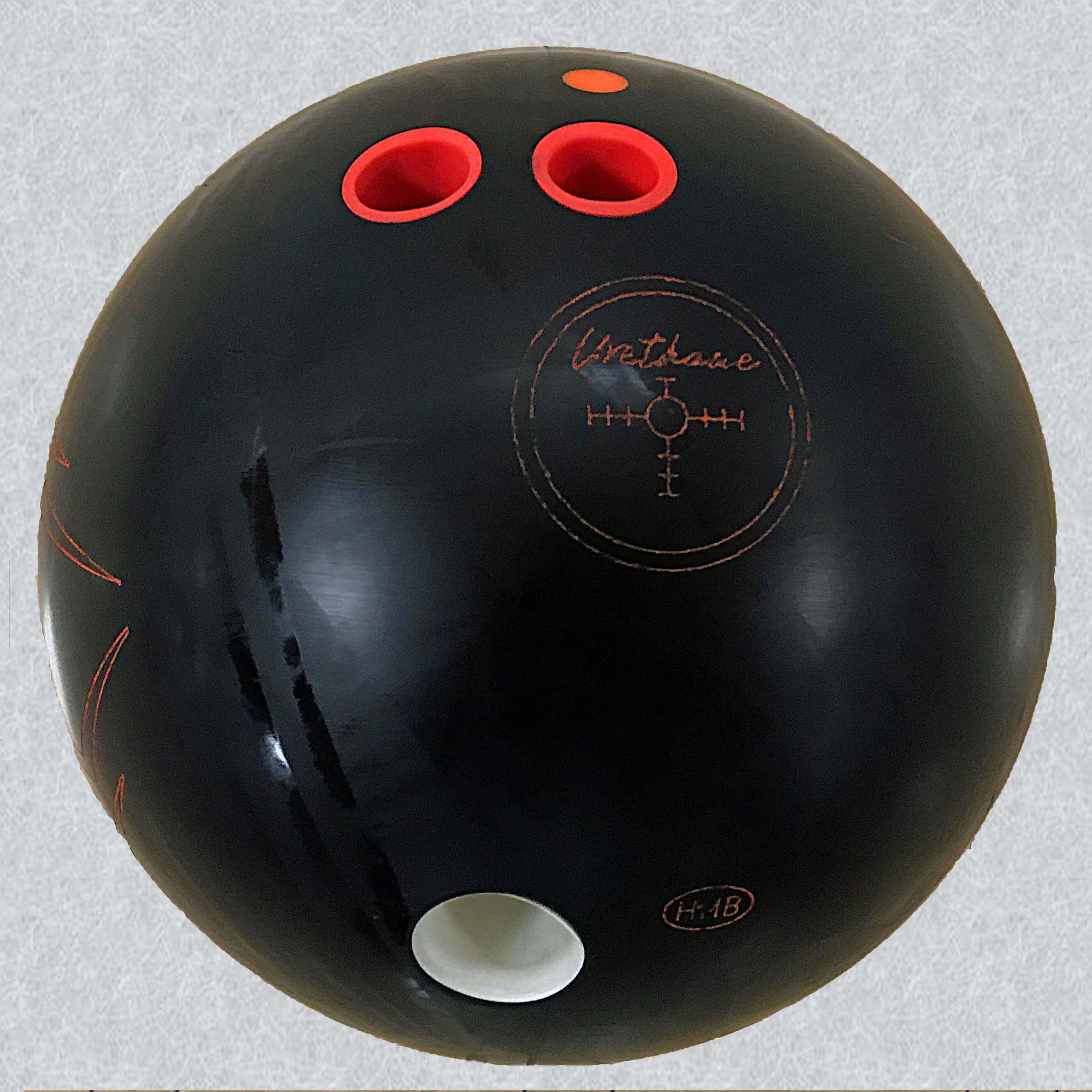
A polyurethane ("urethane") ball with a pin up layout. Urethane coverstocks provide gentler, less angular hooking motion than reactive resin balls.

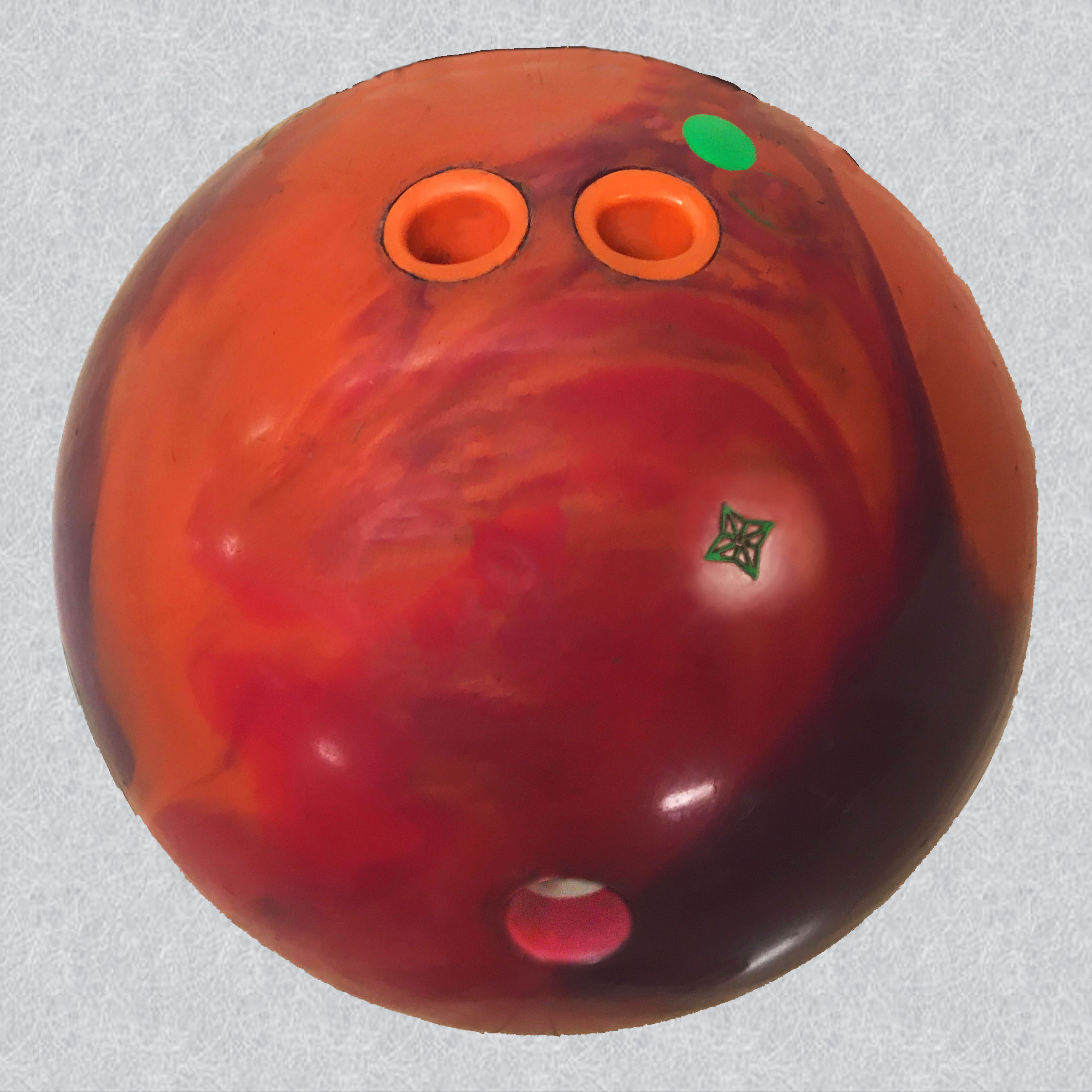
A reactive resin ball with a pin up layout (note green dot). Reactive resin coverstocks increase hook potential. Types include solid, hybrid, and pearl.

The USBC and World Bowling promulgate bowling ball specifications. USBC specifications include physical requirements for weight (≤16 pounds (7.3 kg)), diameter (8.500 inches (21.59 cm)—8.595 inches (21.83 cm)), surface hardness, surface roughness, hole drilling limitations (example: a single balance hole including the thumb hole for "two-handed" bowlers), balance, plug limitations, and exterior markings (structural and commercial), as well as requirements for dynamic performance characteristics such as radius of gyration (RG; 2.46—2.80), RG differential (≤0.06), and coefficient of friction (≤0.32). The USBC banned weight holes (balance holes) in competition, effective August 1, 2020, to prevent their changing ball dynamics. The USBC permits three ounces (85 grams) of static side weight and three ounces (85 grams) of top weight. These figures are up from one ounce (28 grams) following the August 1, 2020 rule change. Effective starting in 2026, the USBC adopted a complex set of rules for certain events that would either prohibit slow oil-absorbing high-performance (urethane) bowling balls or require them to be manufactured with a minimum degree of hardness, the rules being designed to prevent balls from disrupting the intended lane pattern design.

=== Coverstock technology ===
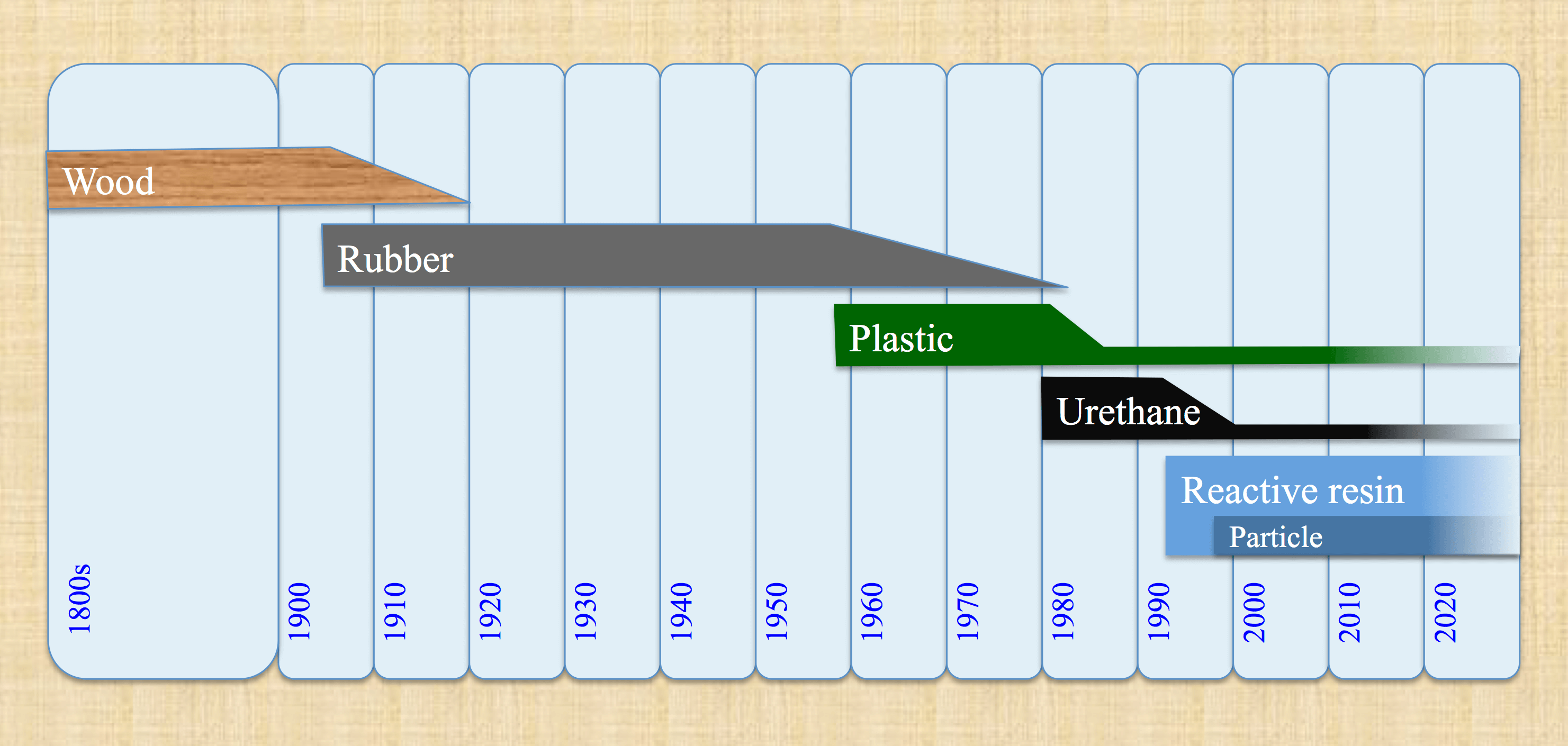
A rough timeline of tenpin bowling ball coverstock technology

Bowling balls were made of lignum vitae (hardwood) until the 1905 introduction of rubber balls. Polyester ("plastic") balls were introduced in 1959 and, despite developing less hook-generating lane friction than rubber balls, by the 1970s plastic dominated over rubber balls. Briefly, "soaker" ball technology—involving softening coverstocks to achieve greater hook—were used, until rules for minimum hardness were implemented. The early-1980s development of polyurethane ("urethane") balls developed more friction with the newly developed polyurethane lane finishes of the day, sparking the evolution of coverstock technology to pursue ever-stronger hooks with correspondingly higher entry angles.

The early 1990s brought development of reactive resin ("reactive") balls by introducing additives in urethane surface materials to create microscopic oil-absorbing pores that increase the "tackiness" that enhances traction. In the "particle-enhanced" balls developed in the late 1990s, microscopic particles embedded in reactive coverstocks reach through oil lane coatings to provide even greater traction. Ball manufacturers developed closely guarded proprietary blends including ground-up material such as glass, ceramic or rubber, to enhance friction.

Within the reactive category are solid reactive coverstocks (having the greatest amount of microscopic pores), pearl reactive coverstocks (including mica additives that enhance reaction on dry lane surfaces), hybrid reactive coverstocks (combining the mid-lane reaction of solid coverstocks and the back-end reaction of pearl coverstocks), and particle coverstocks (including microscopic silica particles, favored for use on heavy oil volumes).

Hook potential has increased so much that dry lane conditions or certain spare shots sometimes cause bowlers to use plastic or urethane balls, to avoid the larger hook provided by reactive technology.

=== Layout and grip ===
A ball's drilling layout refers to how and where holes are drilled, in relation to the ball's locator pin and mass bias (MB) marker. Layout is determined with reference to each bowler's positive axis point (PAP— the pocket end of the ball's initial axis of rotation). "Pin down" layouts place the pin between the finger holes and the thumb hole, while "pin up" layouts place the pin further from the thumb hole than the finger holes (see photos). Bowling ball motion is influenced by how far the pin and the mass bias (MB) are from the PAP, the distances determining track flare. Track flare—the sequence of oil rings showing migration of the ball's axis on successive revolutions through the oil pattern—is popularly thought to influence entry angle, but Freeman & Hatfield (2018) discount its contribution to ball motion.

Side view of ball motion: The ball initially skids after first contact with the oily part of the lane, but enters a roll phase as full traction is eventually obtained in the dry portion of the lane. Side rotation and hook are not illustrated.

Holes may be drilled for a conventional grip (fingers inserted to the second knuckle as with "house balls"), a fingertip grip (fingers inserted only to the first knuckle, enabling greater rev-generating torque), or less standard grips such as the Sarge Easter grip (ring finger inserted to the second knuckle but middle finger inserted only to the first knuckle). Many bowlers using the so-called "two-handed delivery" (which is still a one-handed release) do not insert their thumbs, thus allowing their fingers to impart even more torque than the fingertip grip.

Finger inserts and thumb slugs are custom-fit urethane tubes inserted into the drilled holes, generally for balls with a fingertip grip. Finger inserts enhance the torque provided by the fingers after the thumb exits the ball.

=== Ball motion ===
Progression of various quantities as the ball moves down the lane:
- ball's changing direction and waning speed (direction and size of brown arrows)
- increasing rev rate (motion of yellow arrowheads)
- evolving axis rotation (direction of yellow arrowheads)
- convergence of the ball's forward (translational) speed and rev rate (rotational speed) (bottom chart)

A USBC study investigated the relative importance of various factors on ball motion.

Click through graphic and click the "More details" button for brief descriptions of each factor. Sources in footnote provide more detail.

A complex interaction of a variety of factors influences ball motion and its effect on scoring results. The factors may be categorized as the bowler's delivery, the bowling ball's design, and the condition of the lane.

==== Stages of ball motion ====
Bowling ball motion is commonly broken down into sequential skid, hook, and roll phases. As the ball travels down the lane in the skid and hook phases, frictional contact with the lane causes the ball's forward (translational) speed to continually decrease, but to continually increase its rev rate (rotational speed). Especially as the ball encounters greater friction in the last ≈20 feet (approximate) of the lane, the ball's axis rotation (side rotation) causes the ball to hook away from its original direction. Concurrently, lane friction continually decreases the angle of axis rotation until it exactly matches the direction of the ball's forward motion, and rev rate (rotational speed) increases until it exactly matches the ball's forward speed: full traction is achieved and the ball enters the roll phase in which forward speed continues to decrease.

==== Effect of delivery characteristics on ball motion ====
Release ratio denotes the ratio of the ball's forward (translational) speed to its rev rate (rotational speed) at time of release. This ratio continually decreases throughout the ball's travel until it reaches exactly 1.0 when full traction is achieved upon entering the roll phase. A too-high release ratio, also known as a speed-dominant release, causes the ball to reach the pins while still in the hook phase, resulting in a shallow angle of entry that permits ball deflection and resultant leaves of the 10-pin, while a too-low release ratio, also called a rev-dominant release, causes the ball to enter the roll phase before reaching the pins, sacrificing power to friction that would ideally be delivered to the pins to enhance pin scatter. Ball speed and rev rate are said to be matched if the ball enters the roll phase immediately before impacting the pins, maximizing power imparted to the pins yet helping to provide an entry angle that minimizes ball deflection.

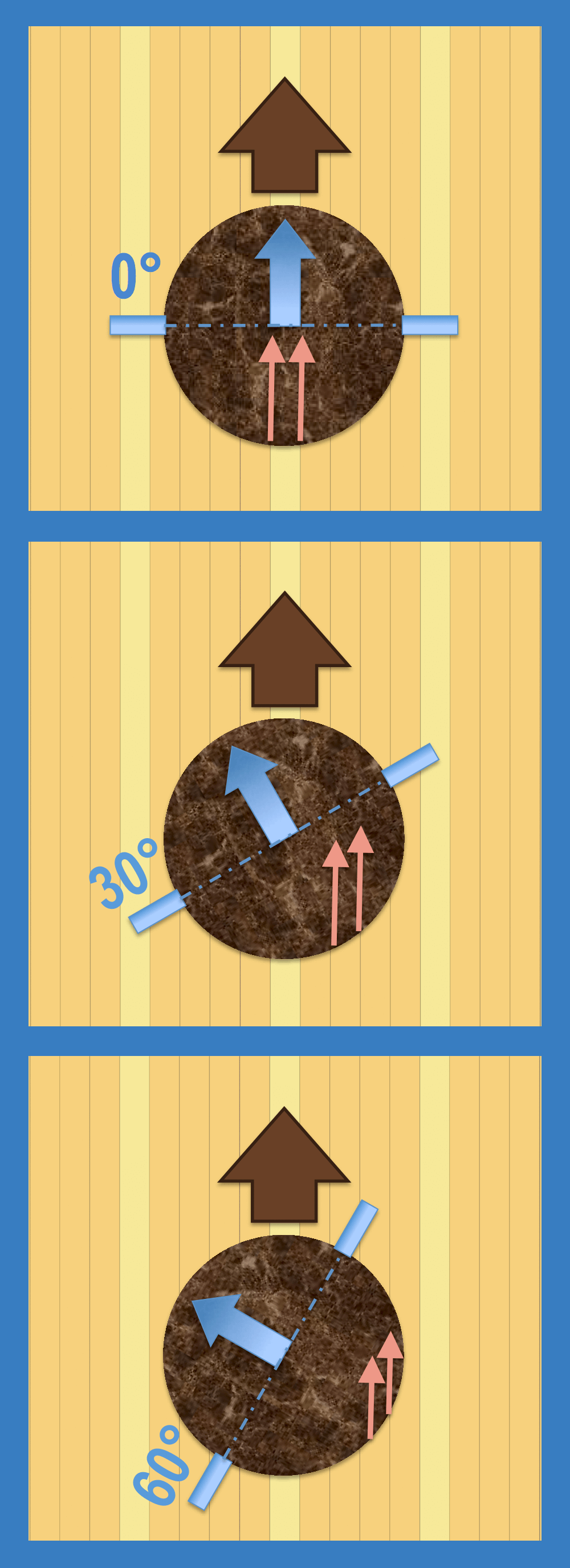
Axis rotation (top view) Blue arrows: ball rotation. Brown arrows: ball direction. Pink arrows: finger motion inducing axis rotation.

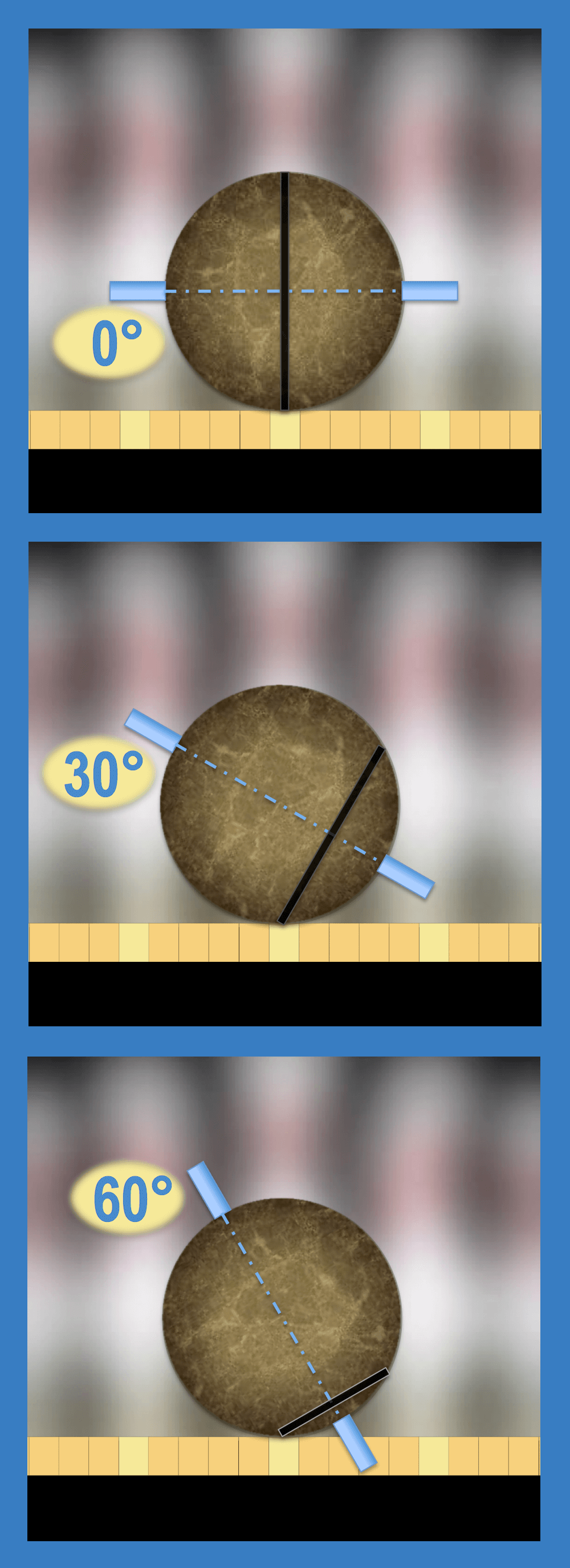
Axis tilt (view from behind). Black rings show the smaller tracks characteristic of greater degrees of axis tilt.

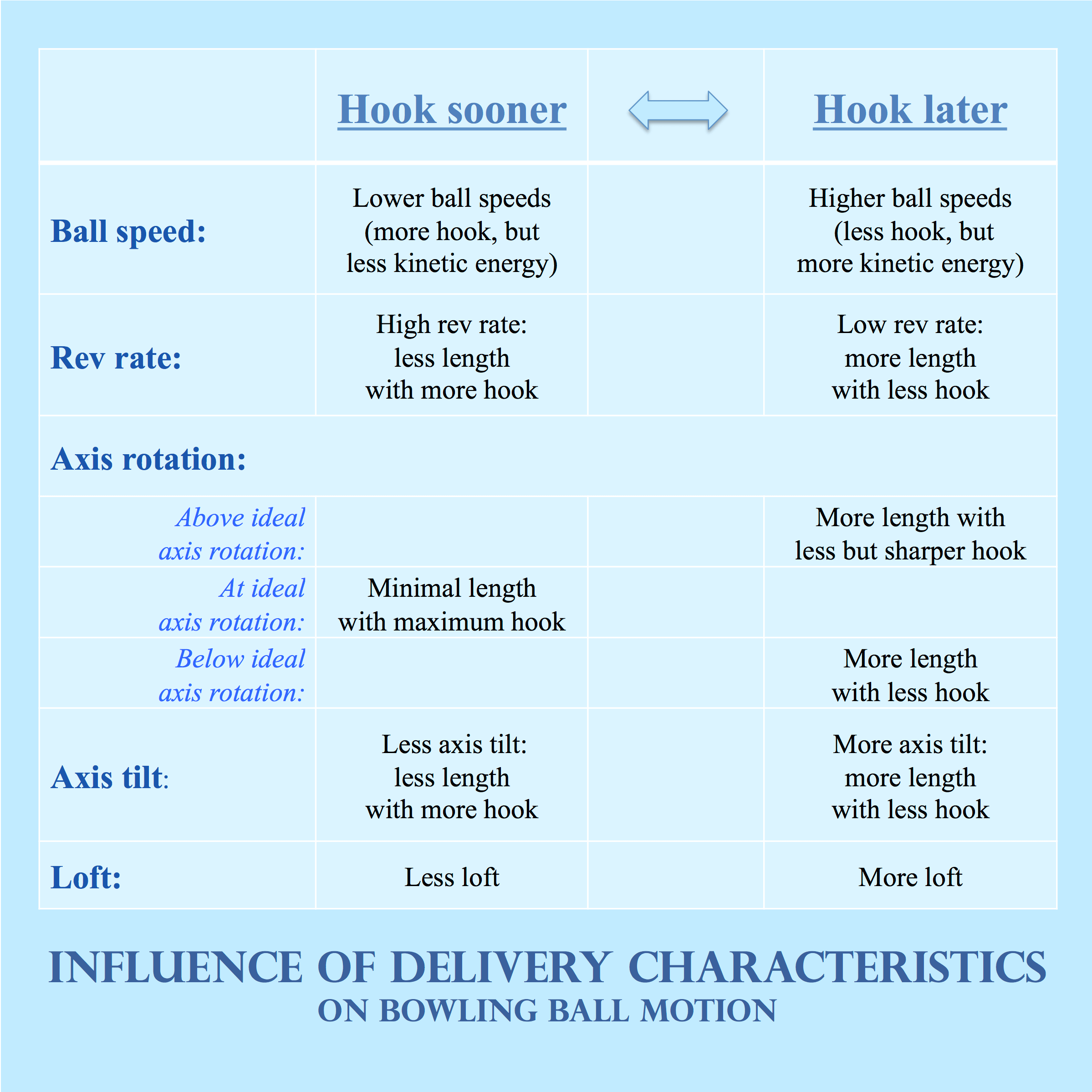
Bowling ball motion is affected by various characteristics of delivery, as discussed by, for example, Freeman & Hatfield (2018). Ball motion is determined by a complex interaction of a variety of factors.

Various characteristics of ball delivery affect a ball's motion throughout its skid, hook and roll phases. The particular way in which energy is imparted to a ball—with varying proportions of that energy divided among ball speed, axis control and rev rate—determines the ball's motion. The following discussion considers delivery characteristics separately, with the understanding that ball motion is determined by a complex interaction of a variety of factors.

Greater ball speeds give the ball less time to hook, thus reducing observed hook though imparting more kinetic energy to the pins; conversely, slower speeds allow more time for greater hook though reducing kinetic energy. A USBC ball motion study concluded that the optimal ball speed is approximately 21 mph at release (17 mph at the pins), speeds typically achievable by professionable bowlers.

Greater rev rates cause the ball to experience more frictional lane contact per revolution and thus (assuming non-zero axis rotation) greater and earlier hook (less "length"— which is the distance from the foul line to the breakpoint at which hooking is maximum); conversely, smaller rev rates cause less frictional engagement and allow the ball to hook less and later (more "length").

Analysis of the influence of axis rotation (sometimes called side rotation) is more complex: There is a degree of axis rotation—generally 25° to 35° and varying with ball speed and rev rate—that may be considered optimal in that hook is maximized; however, this optimum axis rotation also causes minimal length. Specifically, Freeman & Hatfield (2018) report optimal axis rotation to be arcsin (ωr/v) where ω is rev rate (radians/sec), r is ball radius (m), and v is ball speed (m/s). Below and above optimal axis rotation, more length and less hook are encountered, with greater-than-optimal axis rotation causing a sharper hook. Another source states that strictly behind-the-ball release (0° axis rotation) causes an end-over-end rotation, with early hooking, while a release with large side rotation causes greater length before hooking.

Greater degrees of initial (at-the-foul-line) axis tilt cause the ball to rotate on smaller-circumference "tracks" (rings on the ball at which it contacts the lane on each revolution), thus reducing the amount of frictional contact to provide greater length and less hook; conversely, smaller degrees of axis tilt involve larger-circumference tracks with more frictional contact per revolution, thus providing less length and more hook.

Loft—the distance past the foul line at which the ball first contacts the lane—determines the effective length of the lane as experienced by the ball: greater loft distances effectively shorten the lane and provide greater length, while smaller loft distances engage the lane earlier and cause an earlier hook.

==== Effect of coverstock, core and layout on ball motion ====
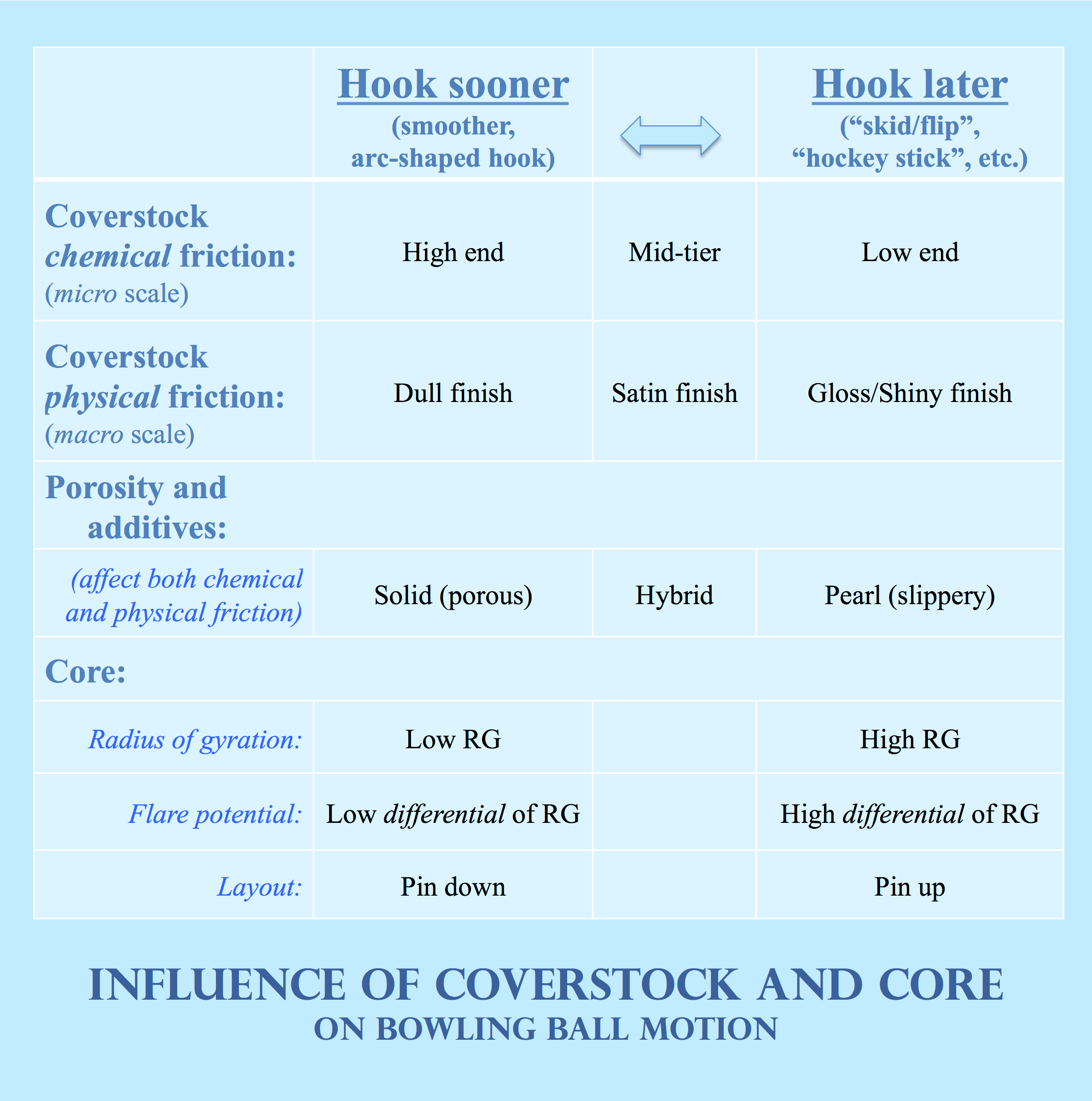
Bowling ball motion is affected by ball design, as discussed by, for example, Freeman & Hatfield (2018). See also the USBC ball motion study by Stremmel, Ridenour & Stervenz (published circa 2008).

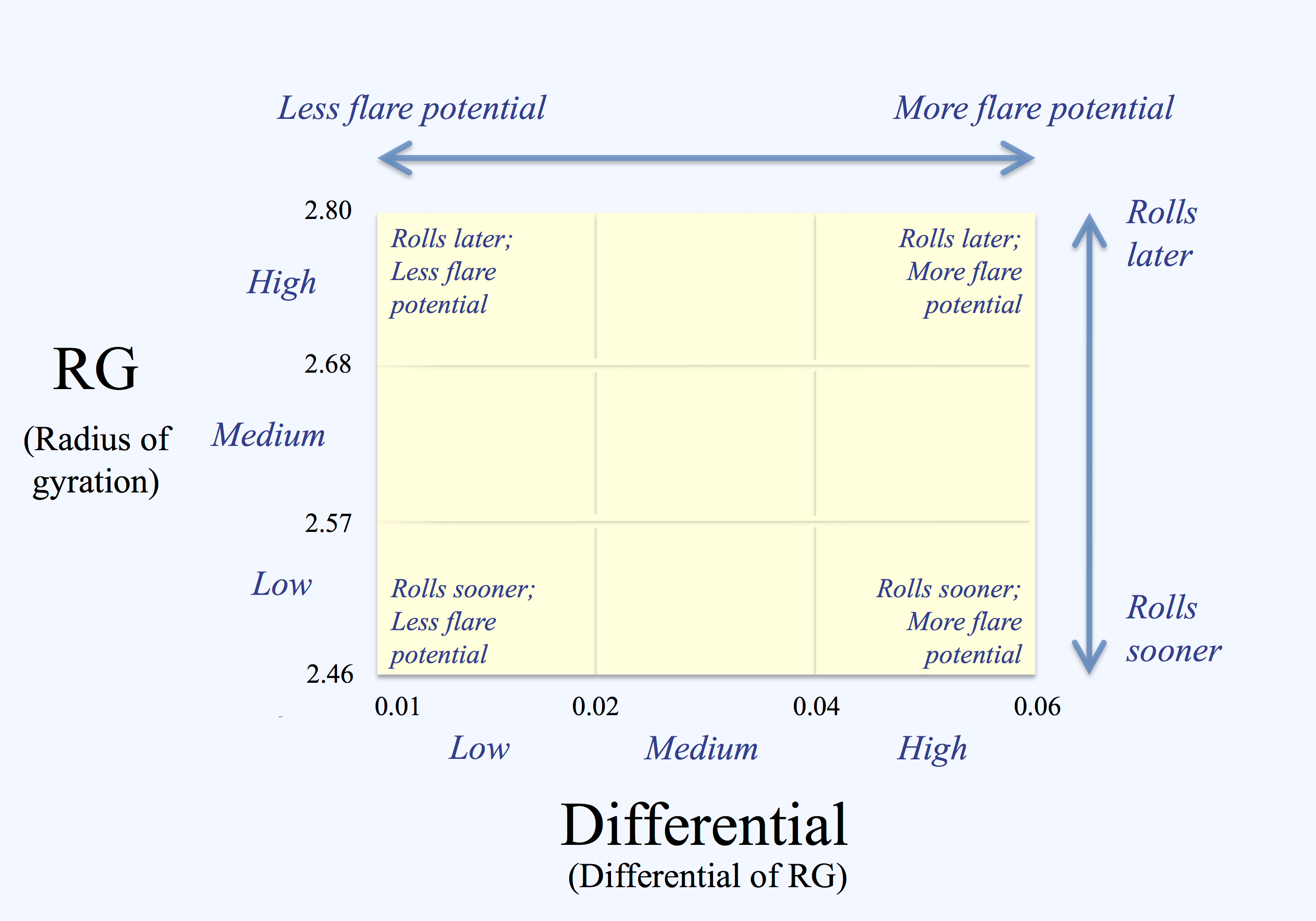
Commonly cited specifications, RG (radius of gyration) and Differential of RG (indicative of flare potential), plotted on orthogonal axes. Freeman & Hatfield (2018) minimize the contribution of differential to ball motion.

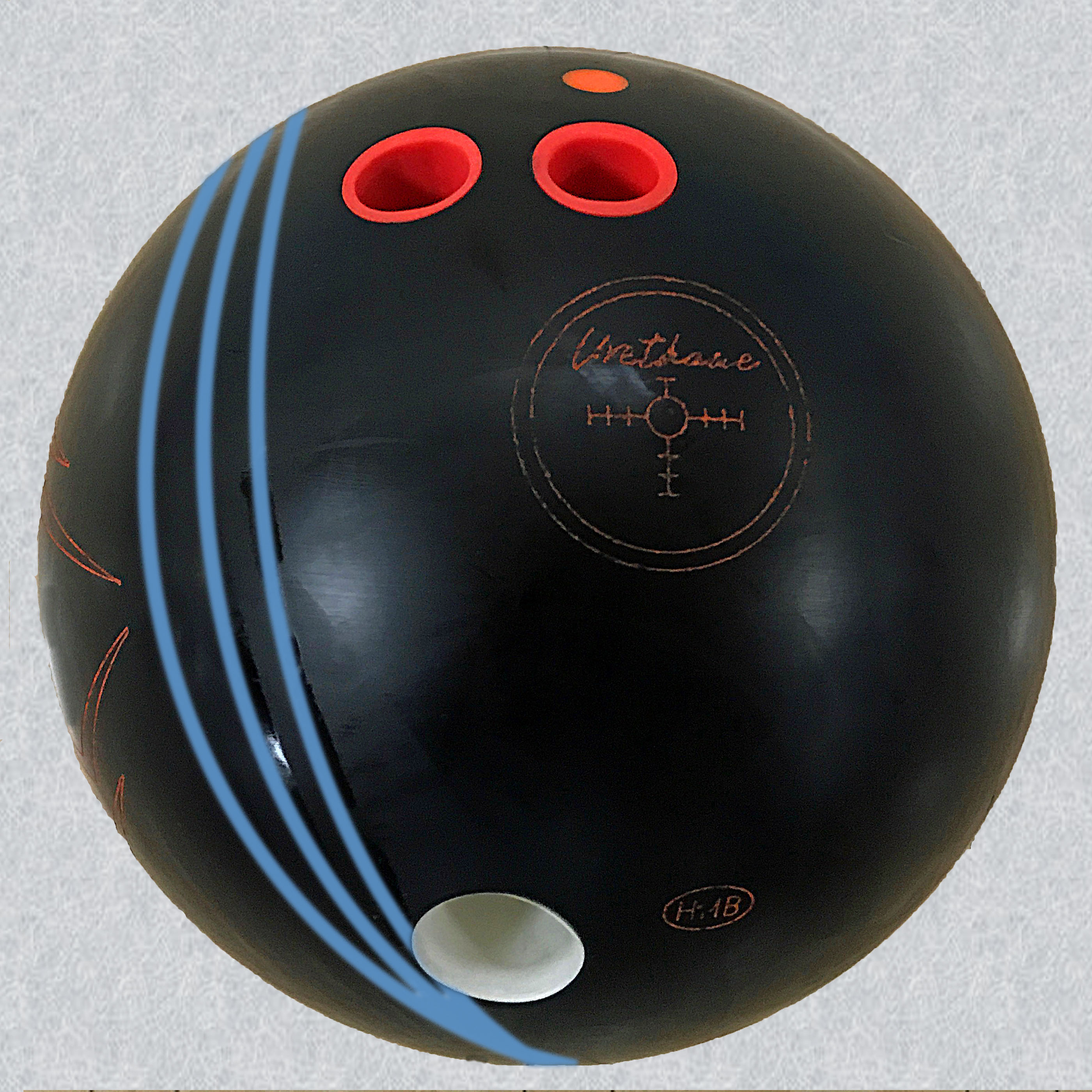
Track flare—not to be confused with "flare potential"—is progression of the ball's oil track (simulated in blue) reflecting migration of the ball's axis of rotation on successive revolutions.

Various characteristics of ball core structure and coverstock composition affect a ball's motion throughout its skid, hook and roll phases. Such motion is largely (about 75%) governed by the lane's frictional interaction with the ball, which exhibits both chemical friction characteristics and physical friction characteristics. Also, the ball's internal structure—especially the density, shape (symmetric vs. asymmetric), and orientation of its core (also called "weight block") relative to the ball's axis of rotation—substantially affect ball motion.

A "dull" (rough) ball surface, having spikes and pores, provides greater friction in the oil-covered front end of the lane but reduced frictional contact in the dry back end of the lane, and thus enables an earlier hook. In contrast, a "gloss" (smooth) ball surface tends to glide atop oil on the front end but establishes greater frictional contact in the dry back end, thus promoting a sharper hook downlane, such as in the "skid/flip" ball path. Accordingly, because different lane conditions and bowler styles favor different hook profiles, there is no single "best" surface.

A 2005-2008 USBC Ball Motion Study found that the ball design factors that most contributed to ball motion were the microscopic "spikes" and pores on the ball's surface (considered part of chemical frictional characteristics), the respective coefficients of friction between ball and lane in the oiled and dry parts of the lane, and the ball's oil absorption rate, followed in dominance by certain characteristics of the ball's core (mainly radius of gyration, and total differential). Freeman and Hatfield (2018) explain that in most circumstances it is chemical friction—controlled by the manufacturer's proprietary coverstock formulation governing its "stickiness"—that primarily determines ball motion. Further, surface finish—modifiable by sandpaper, polish and the like—is also a material factor.

Though manufacturer literature often specifies track flare—exhibited by successive tracks of oil in a "bowtie" pattern and caused by RG differential—the USBC ball motion study showed flare's influence to be small, assuming that a minimal threshold of flare exists to present a "dry" surface for successive ball revolutions. Similarly, though manufacturer literature often describes specific core shapes, differently-shaped cores can make exactly the same contribution to ball motion if they have the same overall RG characteristics.

"Weak" layouts ("pin down": pin between finger and thumb holes) hook sooner but have milder backend reaction, while "strong" layouts ("pin up": pin further from thumb hole than finger holes) enable greater skid lengths and more angular backend reaction.

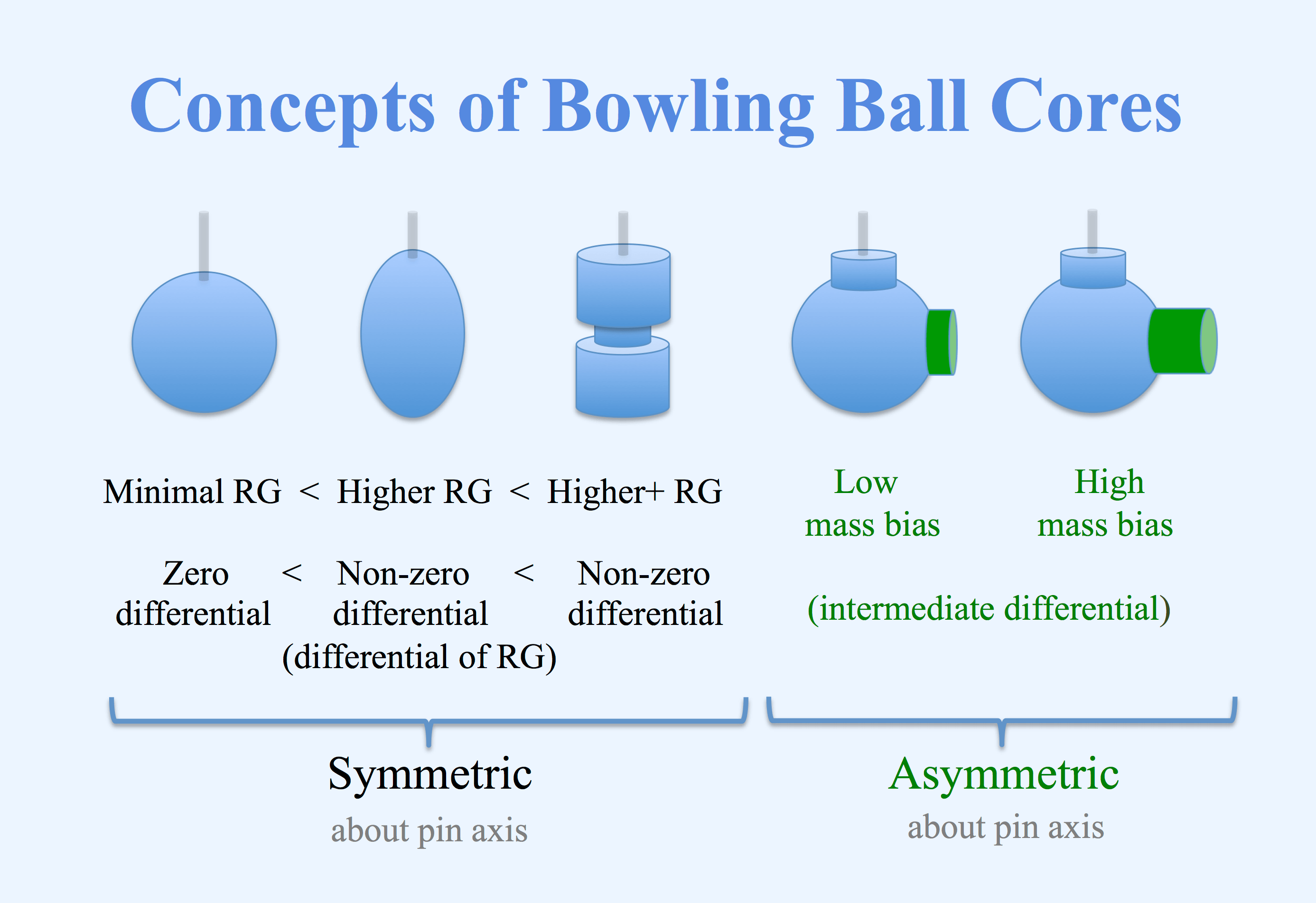
Bowling ball core ("weight block") technical specifications include RG, differential of RG, intermediate differential, and (a)symmetry.

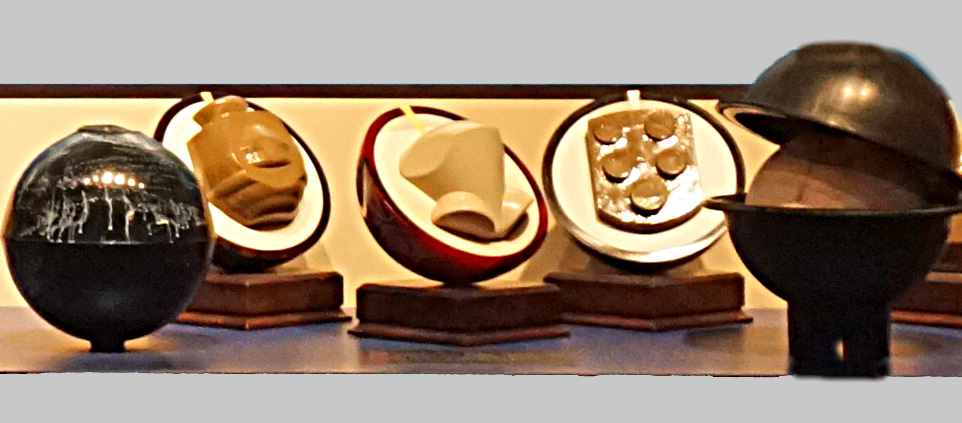
Bowling balls with cores exposed, as displayed in the International Bowling Museum.

Manufacturers commonly cite three specifications relating to a bowling ball's core:

- RG is defined by the USBC as "the distance from the axis of rotation at which the total mass of a body might be concentrated without changing its moment of inertia". In practice, a higher RG indicates that a ball's mass is distributed more toward its cover—making it "cover heavy"—which tends to make the ball enter the roll phase later (further down the lane). Conversely, a lower RG indicates the ball's mass is distributed more towards its center—making it "center heavy"—which tends to make it enter the roll phase sooner.
- Differential of RG is the difference between maximum and minimum RGs measured with respect to different axes. Differential indicates the ball's track flare potential, and contributes to how sharply a ball can hook. A higher differential indicates greater track flare potential—more angular motion from the break point to the pocket—and a lower differential indicates lower flare potential and a smoother arc to the hook.
- Intermediate differential (ID; sometimes termed mass bias or mass bias differential) quantifies the degree to which a bowling ball core is symmetrical or asymmetrical. Analytically, ID is defined by the USBC as the "difference in radius of gyration between the Y (high RG) and Z (intermediate RG) axes". A higher ID indicates greater asymmetry, which causes more area to be created at the break point to cause the ball to respond more quickly to friction than symmetrical balls. ID values .008"– .020" are considered low, while .021"– .037" is considered a high range.

The texture of ball surfaces—measured in "grit" of abrasives used—affects ball path (skid distance and hook intensity).

Informally, a low-differential ball has been likened to one whose core is a spherical object (whose height and width are the same); a high-differential ball has been likened to a tall drinking glass (whose height and width are different); and a high-mass-bias ball has been likened to a tall drinking mug with a handle on the side (giving it different widths in different directions).

Higher-friction surfaces (lower grit numbers) cause balls to hook earlier, and lower-friction surfaces (higher grit numbers) cause balls to skid longer before reacting (hooking).

Reactive cover stocks finishes include matte (aggressive early reaction), shiny (longer skid distance than matte finish), pearl (greatest skid distance among reactive cover stocks), and hybrid (combination of skid distance and back end reaction).

==== Effect of lane characteristics on ball motion ====
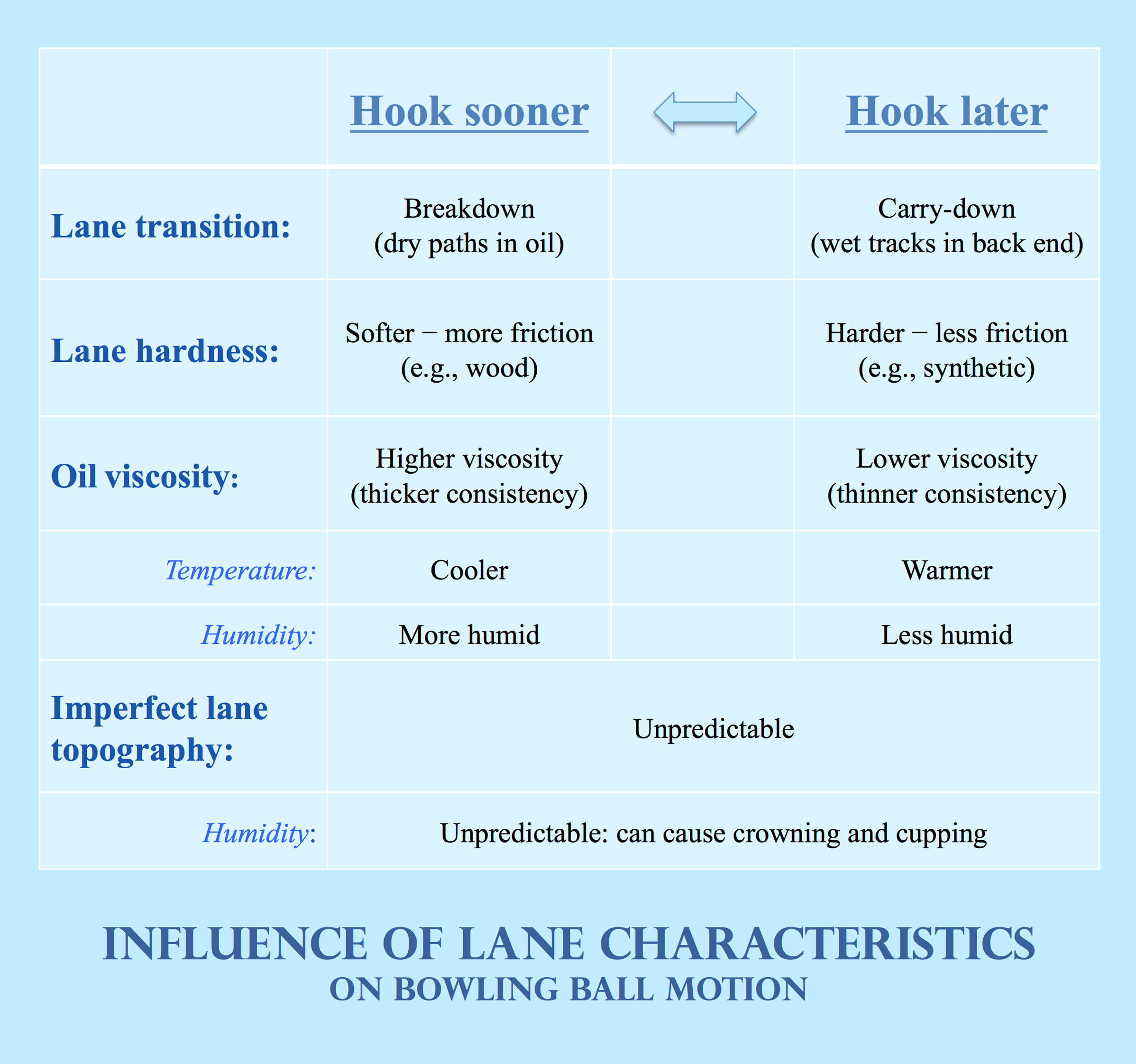
Bowling ball motion is affected by lanes' inherent characteristics (composition, topography), oil viscosity, environmental factors (temperature, humidity), and previous ball traffic.

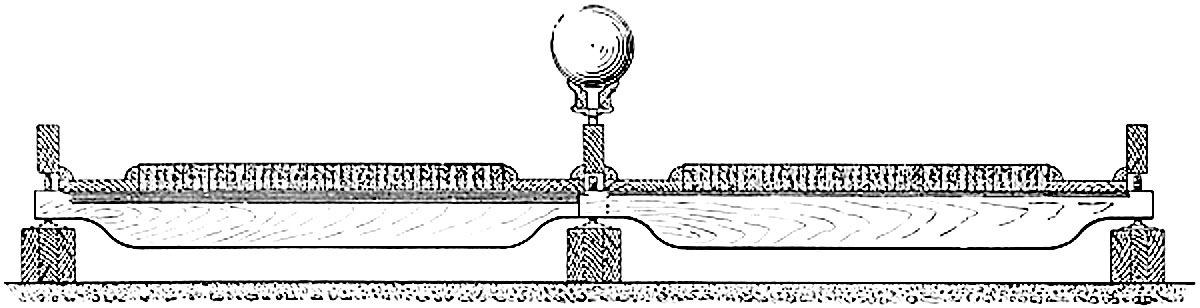
Adjusting screws at the sides of bowling lanes in this 1895 cross-sectional diagram show the recognized importance of controlling lane topography to provide a flat and level surface for repeatable ball motion.

The phenomenon of lane transition occurs when balls remove oil from the lane as they pass, and deposit some of that oil on originally dry parts of the lane. The process of oil removal, commonly called breakdown, forms dry paths that subsequently cause balls to experience increased friction and to hook sooner. Conversely, the process of oil deposition, commonly called carry down, occurs when balls form oil tracks in formerly dry areas, tracks that subsequently cause balls to experience less friction and delayed hook. Balls tend to "roll out" (hook sooner but hook less) in response to breakdown, and, conversely, tend to skid longer (and hook later) in response to carry down—both resulting in light hits. Breakdown is influenced by the oil absorption characteristics and rev rates of the balls that were previously rolled, and carry down is mitigated by modern balls having substantial track flare.

Lane materials with softer surfaces such as wood engage the ball with more friction and thus provide more hook potential, while harder surfaces like synthetic compositions provide less friction and thus provide less hook potential.

Higher-viscosity lane oils (those with thicker consistency) engage balls with more friction and thus cause slower speeds and shorter length but provide more hook potential and reduced lane transition; conversely, lane oils of lower viscosity (thinner consistency) are more slippery and thus support greater speeds and length but offer less hook potential and allow faster lane transition. Various factors influence an oil's native viscosity, including temperature (with higher temperatures causing the oil to be thinner) and humidity (variations of which can cause crowning and cupping of the lane surface). Also, high humidity increases friction that reduces skid distance so the ball tends to hook sooner.

The lanes' physical topography—hills and valleys that diverge from an ideal planar surface—can substantially and unpredictably affect ball motion, even if the lane is within permissible tolerances.

=== Manufacturers ===
The USBC maintains a list, said to be updated weekly, of about 100 bowling ball manufacturers and their approved bowling balls.

== Duckpin balls ==
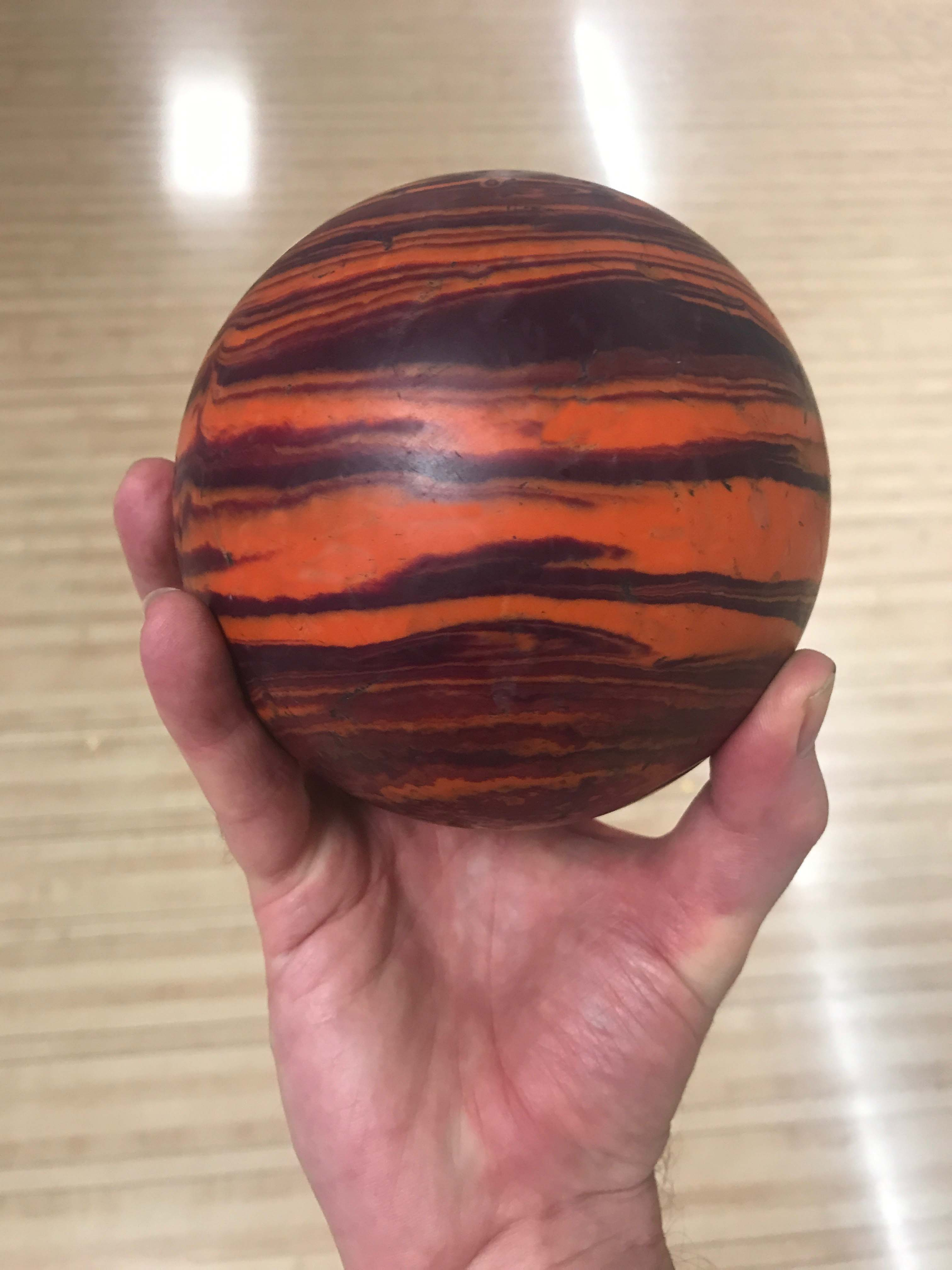
A duckpin bowling ball in an adult hand

Duckpin bowling balls are regulated to be from 4.75–5.00 inches (12.1–12.7 cm) in diameter and to weigh between 3 pounds 6 ounces (1.5 kg) and 3 pounds 12 ounces (1.7 kg). They lack finger holes. Though duckpin balls are slightly larger than candlepin balls, they have less than 60% the diameter of tenpin balls, to match the smaller size of duckpins. Duckpin balls are sometimes used for scaled-down tenpin bowling lanes installed in arcades and other amusement facilities.

== Five-pin balls ==
The basic specifications of five-pin balls are the same a duckpin balls: diameters from 4.75 to 5.0 in (12.1 to 12.7 cm), weights from 3 pounds 6 ounces (1.5 kg) to 3 pounds 12 ounces (1.7 kg); the balls have no finger holes.

== Candlepin balls ==
Candlepin bowling balls have a weight of between 2 lb 4 oz (1.0 kg) and 2 lb 7 oz (1.1 kg), and a diameter of 4.5 in (11 cm)—much smaller than the 8.5 in (22 cm) balls in tenpin bowling, and even smaller than the 5.0 in (13 cm) balls in duckpin bowling . Candlepin balls deflect significantly upon impact, being even lighter than the 2 lb 8 oz (1.1 kg) candlepins themselves.

== Nine-pin balls ==
American nine-pin bowling uses the same ball (and pins) as in tenpin bowling. European nine-pin bowling balls (such as those used in German kegel) are smaller, sized between tenpin and duckpin balls, and have no holes. The ball is 16 cm (6.3 in) in diameter and weighs approximately 2.85 kg (6.3 lb). There are also special balls for novice players, which is 14 cm (5.5 in) in diameter and weigh 1.9 kg (4.2 lb), often with two finger holes.

== See also ==
- Glossary of bowling

== Publications ==
- Benner, Donald; Mours, Nicole; Ridenour, Paul; USBC, Equipment Specifications and Certifications Division (2009). "Pin Carry Study: Bowl Expo 2009" (Slide show presentation). bowl.com (United States Bowling Congress, USBC). Archived (PDF) from the original on December 7, 2010.
- Freeman, James; Hatfield, Ron (July 15, 2018). Bowling Beyond the Basics: What's Really Happening on the Lanes, and What You Can Do about It. BowlSmart. ISBN 978-1 73 241000 8.
- USBC Equipment Specifications and Certification Team (2008). "Ball Motion Study: Phase I and II Final Report" (PDF). Archived (PDF) from the original on March 27, 2023.
- United States Bowling Congress (USBC) (February 2012). "USBC Equipment Specifications and Certifications Manual" (PDF). bowl.com. Archived (PDF) from the original on December 29, 2018.
- United States Bowling Congress (USBC) (February 2018). "Bowling Technology Study: An Examination and Discussion on Technology's Impact in the Sport of Bowling" (PDF). bowl.com. Archived (PDF) from the original on December 31, 2018.
- United States Bowling Congress (USBC) (2025). "Playing Rules 2025-2026" (PDF). bowl.com. Archived (PDF) from the original on March 10, 2026.
- Hooper, Curtis George (December 30, 2023). "Mathematical modelling of the application of lane conditioner to a Tenpin bowling lane". Proceedings of the Institution of Mechanical Engineers, Part P: Journal of Sports Engineering and Technology. doi:10.1177/17543371231217021.
