= 2020 PBA Tour season =

61st season of play for the Professional Bowler's Association

- League: Professional Bowlers Association
- Sport: Ten-pin bowling
- Duration: January 14 – October 12

PBA Tour
- Season MVP: Jason Belmonte

PBA Tour seasons
- ← 2019 2021 →

The 2020 PBA Tour season was the 61st season of play for the Professional Bowlers Association ten-pin bowling tour. It began on January 14th with the Hall of Fame Classic in Arlington, Texas and concluded on October 12 with the PBA Tour Playoffs in Centreville, Virginia.

It was the first full PBA season under the new ownership of the Bowlero Corporation.

All events were suspended mid-March due to the COVID-19 pandemic. A limited return to competition started on June 6. Due to cancellations, only fourteen title events (thirteen singles and one doubles) were held in 2020 (versus twenty-nine in 2019).

== Media rights ==
All announced 2020 PBA Tour events (through June) are broadcast on Fox Sports channels, with a commitment for 24 first-run broadcasts on FS1 and five broadcasts on Fox network affiliates. Prize funds for the events on the Fox Sports calendar have increased $400,000 over 2019, with two major championships (PBA Tournament of Champions and PBA World Championship) offering a $100,000 top prize in the new season. The PBA World Championship winner's share was later increased to $150,000.

CBS Sports Network covered the PBA Tour Finals in July, as it has since the tournament's inception in 2017.

== Season overview ==
In 2020, all five majors were scheduled to be contested within the first three months of the Fox schedule. While the PBA Tournament of Champions and PBA Players Championship majors continued to be held in February, they were now followed in late February by the U.S. Open, which moved to the winter schedule for the first time since 2012. These three majors plus the Go Bowling! PBA Indianapolis Open on Feb. 29 and PBA World Championship on March 15 all offered a $1 million bonus for any player who rolls a 300 game in the championship match.

The PBA's World Series of Bowling XI (which includes three standard PBA title events and the PBA World Championship — the season's fourth major) was scheduled to take place March 6–18 in Las Vegas, while the season's fifth and final major, the USBC Masters, was scheduled to take place March 23–29 in Reno, Nevada. The PBA World Championship concluded March 15, but the match play and final rounds of the animal pattern tournaments were postponed due to the COVID-19 pandemic. In addition, the USBC Masters, PBA Tour Playoffs, and PBA League were also postponed. On July 15, the USBC announced that the 2020 USBC Masters would be cancelled.

On May 20, the PBA announced that it would resume competition beginning in June with several non-title, made-for-TV special events, including the PBA Strike Derby (June 6), PBA Summer Clash (June 13), and PBA King of the Lanes (July 20–22). These events were held at Bowlero Jupiter in Jupiter, Florida with no fans in attendance. Regularly scheduled PBA Tour events, such as the remainder of the World Series of Bowling, the PBA League and PBA Tour Playoffs, were rescheduled for the fall.

The PBA announced on June 11 that the PBA Tour Finals, which features the top eight Tour points leaders over the last two seasons in an elimination-style tournament, would be held July 18–19 in Jupiter, Florida, despite the fact that top points earner Jason Belmonte of Australia could not attend due to COVID-19 travel restrictions. The #9 player in points, Norm Duke, took Belmonte's place. This was the first title event to be held since the COVID-19 pandemic halt. CBS Sports Network aired all rounds of the tournament (nine hours) in live broadcasts over the two days.

The PBA League held its draft on May 17, and announced that the League has expanded to ten teams (up from eight in previous seasons). On June 23, following the cancellation of the 2020 PWBA Tour season, the PBA further announced that two all-women's teams will be added to the PBA League, bringing the team total to 12. The draft for the two women's teams (10 players total) was held July 7 from a pool of the top 35 PWBA players in 2019 season points. The day after the women's draft, the PBA announced that the PBA League would take place September 26–28 in Portland, Maine. On August 20, it was announced that the PBA League was changing its location for 2020 to Centreville, Virginia and will be held without fans in attendance. The PBA further announced that television coverage on FS1 would be expanded to 12 hours over four days. Following the seeding rounds on September 26, the quarterfinals, semifinals and finals were all broadcast live September 27–30 on FS1.

On September 25, the PBA announced that the PBA League will be immediately followed by the match play rounds and TV finals for the World Series of Bowling animal pattern tournaments (postponed from March and relocated to Centreville, VA), with the final rounds airing October 4 and 5. Finally, the PBA Tour Playoffs were rescheduled for an October 10 start, with air dates spread out between October 10 and November 8. Further, the PBA announced Guaranteed Rate mortgage as the official sponsor of all Fall 2020 events.

=== Season highlights ===
- Jason Belmonte won the U.S. Open in February, upping his career majors record to 12. The win made Belmonte the PBA's seventh player to earn the career Triple Crown (U.S. Open, PBA World Championship and Tournament of Champions). He also joins Norm Duke and Mike Aulby as the only players to add the USBC Masters for a career "grand slam" and, with Aulby, one of only two bowlers to add the PBA Players Championship for a career "super slam".
- Belmonte also won the PBA World Championship on March 15, earning the highest first-place prize of the season ($150,000). This gives Belmonte another major, upping his career record to 13. The PBA World Championship was the only World Series of Bowling XI event to be completed on schedule due to the COVID-19 pandemic shut-down. The remainder of the World Series was completed in October.
- Jesper Svensson won two titles on the year – both in Indianapolis – giving him 10 career PBA Tour titles and making him title-eligible for the PBA Hall of Fame. Kyle Troup, Svensson's doubles partner in his Roth-Holman PBA Doubles Championship win, won three titles on the season, including the fourth annual PBA Tour Finals in July.
- Bill O'Neill won two titles: the PBA Players Championship in February (his second career major) and the second annual PBA Tour Playoffs in October, where he outlasted 23 other bowlers to earn the $100,000 first prize.
- Kris Prather won his third title, first major and second career $100,000 prize check in the Tournament of Champions, topping O'Neill in the February 9 final.
- The Portland Lumberjacks earned a sweep of the two PBA League events on September 26–30. The Lumberjacks won their second consecutive team title behind back-to-back League MVP winner Wes Malott. Malott then won the special PBA League All-Star Clash, which featured one representative from each PBA League team, earning a prize check for himself as well as his teammates.
- The 2020 season saw three televised 300 games (the 27th, 28th, and 29th in PBA history), by Tommy Jones, Jakob Butturff, and François Lavoie, respectively. Lavoie had previously bowled the 26th televised 300 en route to winning the 2016 U.S. Open, and now joins Sean Rash as the only players in history to bowl 300 games in two televised PBA Tour title events. Jones became just the third player in history to bowl his televised 300 in the title match. Kyle Troup nearly joined this group, bowling a televised 299 game.

=== Season awards ===
- Chris Schenkel PBA Player of the Year: Jason Belmonte
- Steve Nagy PBA Sportsmanship Award: Brad Miller
- Tony Reyes PBA Community Service Award: Danny Wiseman

Note: The Harry Golden PBA Rookie of the Year Award was not given this season because of the abbreviated schedule.

== Tournament summary ==
The 2020 PBA tournament schedule is shown below. Major tournaments are in bold. Career PBA title numbers for winners are shown in parentheses (#). Winner's share prize money is shown in US dollars.

Tour points are awarded for most events. Besides the season-ending Harry Smith PBA Points Winner award, points are one consideration for Player of the Year voting, and also affect eligibility for the PBA Playoffs, PBA Tour Finals (combined with 2019 points), and the 2021 DHC PBA Japan Invitational. Points for tournaments are awarded differently based on a "tier" system. The tier of each qualifying tournament is shown in the Notes column on the tournament schedule, and is explained below.

- Tier 3: PBA short format or limited field tournaments (2500 points for first, and descending thereafter)
- Tier 2: PBA standard tournaments with a fully open field (double the points of Tier 3 events)
- Tier 1: PBA major tournaments (triple the points of Tier 3 events)

Event	Airdate	City	Preliminary rounds	Final round	Oil pattern	Winner	Notes
PBA Hall of Fame Classic (304,000 viewers)	Jan 19 FS1	Arlington, TX	Jan 14–18	Live	Left lane: Dick Weber 45; Right lane: Mike Aulby 38	Tommy Jones, USA (20)	Open event (Tier 3–limited field). $30,000 top prize.+
PBA Oklahoma Open	Jan 26 FS1	Shawnee, OK	Jan 21–25	Live	Left lane: Dragon 45; Right lane: Wolf 32	Sean Rash, USA (15)	Open event (Tier 2). $30,000 top prize.
PBA Greater Jonesboro Open (296,000 viewers)	Feb 1 FS1	Jonesboro, AR	Jan 27–31	Live	Left lane: Shark 48; Right lane: Viper 36	Kyle Troup, USA (4)	Open event (Tier 3–limited field). $30,000 top prize.
**PBA Tournament of Champions** (1,464,000 viewers)	Feb 9 Fox	Fairlawn, OH	Feb 4–8	Live	Don Johnson 40	Kris Prather, USA (3)	Invitational event (Tier 1). PBA major. $100,000 top prize.
**PBA Players Championship** (541,000 viewers)	Feb 15 FS1	Columbus, OH	Feb 11–14	Live	Wayne Webb 38	Bill O'Neill, USA (12)	Open members-only event (Tier 1). PBA major. $75,000 top prize.
**76th U.S. Open** (1,146,000 viewers)	Feb 23 Fox	Lincoln, NE	Feb 16–22	Live	U.S. Open (4 custom patterns)	Jason Belmonte, Australia (23)	Open event (Tier 1). PBA major. $30,000 top prize.
Go Bowling! PBA Indianapolis Open	Feb 29 FS1	Indianapolis, IN	Feb 25–26	Live	Left lane: Mark Roth 42; Right lane: Marshall Holman 37	Jesper Svensson, Sweden (9)	Open event (Tier 2). $30,000 top prize.
Roth-Holman PBA Doubles Championship (273,000 viewers)	Mar 8 FS1	Indianapolis, IN	Feb 27–28	Feb 29	Left lane: Mark Roth 42; Right lane: Marshall Holman 37	Jesper Svensson, Sweden (10) & Kyle Troup, USA (5)	Open event (Tier 3–limited field). $30,000 top prize (team).
**PBA World Championship** (397,000 viewers)	Mar 15 FS1	Las Vegas, NV	Mar 8–12	Live	Qualifying: Cheetah, Chameleon, Scorpion; Cashers round thru finals: Earl Anthony 43	Jason Belmonte, Australia (24)	Open event for WSOB XI entrants (Tier 1). PBA major. $150,000 top prize.
PBA Strike Derby (718,000 viewers)	Jun 6 Fox	Jupiter, FL	Jun 6	Live	Jupiter 42	Kris Prather, USA	Non-title event. $25,000 top prize.
PBA Summer Clash (890,000 viewers)	Jun 13 Fox	Jupiter, FL	Jun 7	Jun 7	Jupiter 42	Sean Rash, USA	Non-title event. $20,000 top prize.
PBA Tour Finals	Jul 19 CBS Sports	Jupiter, FL	Jul 18–19	Live	Johnny Petraglia 46 & Marshall Holman 37	Kyle Troup, USA (6)	Invitational event. Top 8 in points from start of 2019 season through 2020 PBA World Championship. $30,000 top prize.
PBA King of the Lanes	Jul 22 FS1	Jupiter, FL	Jul 20–21	Live	Jupiter 42	Kris Prather, USA	Non-title event. Each round pays $10,000 to the King match winner, $5,000 for second, $3,000 for third.
PBA League	Division Quarterfinals: Sep 27 FS1; Division Semifinals: Sep 28 FS1; Division Finals: Sep 29 FS1; Finals: Sep 30 FS1	Centreville, VA	Sep 26–29	Live	Mark Roth 42	Portland Lumberjacks: Wes Malott (MVP), Martin Larsen, Packy Hanrahan, Kyle Troup, Kris Prather, Mgr-Tim Mack	Non-title PBA team event. $60,000 top prize.
PBA WSOB XI Go Bowling! Cheetah Championship	Oct 4 FS1	Las Vegas, NV & Centreville, VA	Mar 8, Oct 1	Live	Cheetah 33	Sean Rash, USA (16)	Open event (Tier 3–short format). $25,000 top prize.
PBA WSOB XI Chameleon Championship	Oct 4 FS1	Las Vegas, NV & Centreville, VA	Mar 9, Oct 1	Live	Chameleon 39	Jason Belmonte, Australia (25)	Open event (Tier 3–short format). $25,000 top prize.
PBA WSOB XI Scorpion Championship	Oct 5 FS1	Las Vegas, NV & Centreville, VA	Mar 10, Oct 2	Live	Scorpion 42	Carsten Hansen, Denmark (2)	Open event (Tier 3–short format). $25,000 top prize.
2020 PBA Tour Playoffs	Round of 24-Group 1: Oct 10 Fox (737,000 viewers); Round of 16-Group 1: Oct 17 Fox (591,000 viewers); Round of 24-Group 2: Oct 25 FS1; Round of 16-Group 2: Nov 1 FS1; Round of 8: Nov 8 FS1; Semifinals & Finals: Nov 8 FS1	Centreville, VA	Oct 10–11	Oct 12	Don Carter 39	Bill O'Neill, USA (13)	Invitational event. Top 24 in points through YTD 2020 events, with the top 8 earning byes into the Round of 16. $100,000 top prize.
PBA League All-Star Clash (1,353,000 viewers)	Nov 29 Fox	Centreville, VA	N/A	Sep 30	Mark Roth 42	Wes Malott (Portland Lumberjacks)	Non-title invitational event. One representative from each PBA League team, based on most PBA or PWBA titles. $25,000 prize to winning player, plus $50,000 prize for winning player's team.

+ Tommy Jones won an additional $10,000 for rolling a 300 game in the title match.
