= 2016 PBA Tour season =

PBA Bowling Tour: 2016 Season
- League: Professional Bowlers Association
- Sport: Ten-pin bowling
- Duration: January 12 – December 16

PBA Tour
- Season MVP: E. J. Tackett

PBA Tour seasons
- ← 2015 2017 →

2016 is the 57th season of the Professional Bowlers Association (PBA) Tour. There were 26 singles title events, two doubles title events, and two team events on the 2016 schedule.

== Tournament schedule and recaps ==
For the eighth year in a row, the PBA held multiple fall North American events in one location, at the GEICO PBA World Series of Bowling VIII (WSOB VIII). Taking place in Reno, Nevada for the second straight season, the event included four "animal" oil pattern events (Cheetah, Chameleon, Scorpion and Shark). While each provide individual PBA titles, the four pattern tournaments in WSOB VIII also served as initial qualifying for the PBA World Championship. The top 25% of players in total pinfall over the 32 games of qualifying (8 games per pattern tournament) moved on to the PBA World Championship cashers round, and bowled an additional six games of qualifying on the PBA World Championship oil pattern to determine the top 24. Three additional match play rounds of eight games each determined the field for the televised finals. The WSOB field announced on November 16 included participants from a record 22 countries.

Several international tour stops, which are part of the World Bowling Tour (WBT), were again part of the PBA schedule. As in 2015, a PBA title was awarded for any qualifying WBT tournaments won by a PBA member. For the second straight season, some tournaments formerly consigned as PBA Regional Tour stops now qualified the winner to earn a PBA title in addition to a minimum $10,000 top prize for each event. These nine tour stops were designated as "Xtra Frame" tournaments, because they are broadcast exclusively (start-to-finish) on the PBA's Xtra Frame webcast service. For 2016, the Xtra Frame series had a rolling points list, with a $10,000 bonus given to the player with the most points after all eight Xtra Frame singles events were completed. (Note: The Xtra Frame series was shortened to seven singles events when the PBA Xtra Frame Tamarac Classic in Florida was cancelled due to Hurricane Matthew.) Tommy Jones was the bonus winner with 89 points, surpassing E. J. Tackett (84 points) in the final Xtra Frame event of the season.

After three seasons, the PBA dropped the "Summer Swing" series that had taken place in Milwaukee, Wisconsin (2013) and Shawnee, Oklahoma (2014–15), in favor of a Fall Swing series that took place September 5–11 in Allen Park, Michigan. Oil patterns and event structure, however, were the same as the previous Summer Swing series. The Swing features the shortest and longest oil patterns used in any PBA tournament (32-foot "Wolf" and 52-foot "Badger"), plus a 40-foot U.S. Open-style pattern ("Bear").

=== Season highlights ===
Young players dominated the major tournaments in 2016:

- 2015 PBA Rookie of the Year Jesper Svensson of Sweden won the PBA Fire Lake Tournament of Champions for his third title and first major. Svensson, who was just shy of his 21st birthday at the time, became the youngest player ever to win this tournament. The previous record-holder was Marshall Holman, who won the 1976 TOC at age 21.
- One week after Svensson's historic feat, Anthony Simonsen (age 19 years, 36 days) won the USBC Masters to become the youngest player to win a PBA major of any kind. Mike Aulby had held that distinction for over 36 years, having won the 1979 PBA National Championship at age 19 years, 83 days. The victory was Simonsen's first singles title, and second title overall.
- The PBA Players Championship, re-elevated to major status in 2016, was won by 24-year old Ontario native Graham Fach, who became the first bowler from Canada to win a PBA title.
- 23-year old François Lavoie, a Canadian native who bowled collegiately at Wichita State University, won the 63rd U.S. Open, and rolled a 300 game in the semifinal match. It was the 26th perfect game in a televised PBA Tour event, and the first ever to be rolled in the televised finals of the U.S. Open.
- In the season's final major event on December 11, 24-year old E. J. Tackett won the PBA World Championship in Reno, NV. The victory was Tackett's first career major, his fifth title overall, and his fourth title of the 2016 season.

Additional highlights:

- The GoBowling.com Dallas Strikers, a five-player team headed by player-manager Norm Duke, rolled a nationally televised Baker format 300 game in the semifinal round of the PBA League Elias Cup event (broadcast May 1 on ESPN). This is the first Baker format perfect game recorded in PBA history. Although the standard $10,000 bonus that is given for a televised 300 game by an individual did not apply, the PBA retroactively awarded the bonus to Duke and his teammates (Tommy Jones, Bill O'Neill, Shawn Maldonado and B.J. Moore) on June 30, 2016.

Awards for the 2016 season were as follows:

- GEICO Chris Schenkel PBA Player of the Year: E. J. Tackett
- Harry Golden PBA Rookie of the Year: François Lavoie
- Steve Nagy Sportsmanship Award: Tom Smallwood
- Tony Reyes Community Service Award: Rhino Page
- George Young High Average Award: Jesper Svensson (226.07)

=== Tournament summary ===
Below is a schedule of events for the 2016 PBA Tour season. Major tournaments are in bold. Career PBA title numbers for winners are shown in parentheses (#).

| Event | Airdate | City | Preliminary rounds | Final round | Oil pattern | Winner | Notes |
|---|---|---|---|---|---|---|---|
| Mark Roth/Marshall Holman PBA Doubles Championship* | Jan 17 E | Las Vegas, NV & Reno, NV | Oct 20–21, 2015 (Las Vegas) | Dec 18, 2015 (Reno) | Mark Roth | Anthony Simonsen, USA (1) and Connor Pickford, USA (1) | Open event. |
| DHC PBA Japan Invitational 2016 | Jan 31 E2 | Tokyo | Jan 12–16 | Jan 17 | | Amleto Monacelli, Venezuela (20) | Invitational event. $40,000 (U.S.) first prize. |
| 51st **PBA Fire Lake Tournament of Champions** | Feb 7 E | Shawnee, OK | Feb 1–6 | Live | TOC Custom | Jesper Svensson, Sweden (3) | Invitational event. PBA major. $50,000 first prize. |
| **USBC Masters** | Feb 14 E | Indianapolis, IN | Feb 8–13 | Live | USBC Custom | Anthony Simonsen, USA (2) | Open event. PBA major. $50,000 first prize. |
| **Barbasol PBA Players Championship** | Feb 21 E | Columbus, OH | Feb 15–20 | Live | Custom | Graham Fach, Canada (1) | Open event. PBA major. $40,000 first prize. |
| H.H. Emir Cup | N/A | Doha, Qatar | Feb 24 – Mar 1 | Mar 2 | | Danielle McEwan, USA (NQ) | WBT and PBA title event. $20,000 first prize. |
| Kingdom of Bahrain International Bowling Championship | N/A | Sitra, Bahrain | Mar 3–8 | Mar 9 | | Ahmed Al Awadhi, Bahrain (a) | WBT and PBA title event. $25,000 first prize. |
| Brunswick Euro Challenge | N/A | Munich, Germany | Mar 13–19 | Mar 20 | | Jesper Svensson, Sweden (4) | WBT and PBA title event. €11,300 first prize ($12,770 U.S.). |
| PBA League Elias Cup | Quarters: Apr 17, 24 E Semis: May 1 E Finals: May 8 E | Portland, ME | Mar 31 – Apr 2 | Apr 3 | Multiple | gobowling.com Dallas Strikers (Tommy Jones, Bill O'Neill, Shawn Maldonado, BJ Moore and player-manager Norm Duke) | Non-title team event. $60,000 top prize.+ |
| bowlingball.com PBA Xtra Frame Maine Shootout | Apr 6 X | Portland, ME | Apr 4–5 | Live | | Ryan Ciminelli, USA (6) | Open event. $10,000 first prize. |
| PBA Xtra Frame Storm Open | April 24 X | Carpentersville, IL | Apr 22–23 | Live | Cheetah | E. J. Tackett, USA (2) | Open event. $10,000 first prize. |
| Downums Waste Services PBA Xtra Frame Jonesboro Open | Jun 5 X | Jonesboro, AR | Jun 3–4 | Live | Scorpion | Tommy Jones, USA (17) | Open event. $15,000 first prize. |
| PBA Xtra Frame Lubbock Sports Southwest Open | Jun 26 X | Lubbock, TX | Jun 24–25 | Live | Viper | Jakob Butturff, USA (1) | Open event. $20,000 first prize. |
| PBA Xtra Frame Striking Against Breast Cancer Mixed Doubles | Jul 31 X | Houston, TX | Jul 29–30 | Live | | Bill O'Neill, USA (8) and Shannon O'Keefe, USA | Open event. $16,000 top prize. |
| World Bowling Tour Thailand | N/A | Bangkok, Thailand | Aug 6–11 | Aug 12 | | Jesper Svensson, Sweden (5) | WBT and PBA title event. ฿1,000,000 first prize ($32,260 U.S.) |
| PBA Xtra Frame Gene Carter's Pro Shop Classic | Aug 21 X | Middletown, DE | Aug 19–20 | Live | WC | Michael Haugen Jr., USA (5) | Open event. $15,000 top prize. |
| PBA Fall Swing Wolf Open | Sep 21 C | Allen Park, MI | Sep 5 | Sep 10 | Wolf | Tom Daugherty, USA (2) | Open event. $10,000 top prize. |
| PBA Fall Swing Bear Open | Sep 28 C | Allen Park, MI | Sep 6 | Sep 10 | Bear | E. J. Tackett, USA (3) | Open event. $10,000 top prize. |
| PBA Fall Swing Badger Open | Oct 5 C | Allen Park, MI | Sep 7 | Sep 10 | Badger | Sean Rash, USA (10) | Open event. $10,000 top prize. |
| PBA Fall Swing Detroit Open | Oct 12 C | Allen Park, MI | Sep 5–8 | Sep 11 | Wolf, Bear and Badger (6 qualifying games on each); top seed (Jason Belmonte) chose Bear for TV finals | Sean Rash, USA (11) | Starting field includes top 18 in combined points from Wolf, Bear and Badger opens. $18,000 top prize. |
| PBA Fall King of the Swing | Oct 19 C | Allen Park, MI | Sep 5–8, 10–11 | Sep 11 | Badger (left lane) and Wolf (right lane) | E. J. Tackett, USA | Non-title event. Winners of Fall Swing events plus top qualifier(s) among non-winners compete for $10,000. |
| PBA Xtra Frame Parkside Lanes Open | Oct 2 X | Aurora, IL | Sep 30 – Oct 1 | Live | Multiple | Ryan Ciminelli, USA (7) | Open event. $10,000 top prize. |
| PBA Xtra Frame Las Vegas Open | Oct 30 X | Las Vegas, NV | Oct 28-29 | Live | | Jakob Butturff, USA (2) | Open event. $10,000 top prize. |
| PBA Team Challenge | Nov 1 X | Las Vegas, NV | Oct 31 | Live | | 'Merica Rooster Illusion: Marshall Kent (2), Chris Loschetter (2), Rhino Page (4), Ronnie Russell (4), E.J. Tackett (4) | Team and PBA title event. $30,000 top prize. |
| **U.S. Open** | Nov 9 C | Las Vegas, NV | Nov 4–8 | Live | U.S. Open Custom | François Lavoie, Canada (1) | Open event. PBA major. $30,000 top prize.# |
| PBA Cheetah Championship | Dec 18 E | Reno, NV | Nov 29, Dec 6, 8 | Dec 10 | Cheetah | Mike Wolfe, USA (5) | Open event. $20,000 first prize. |
| PBA Chameleon Championship | Dec 24 E | Reno, NV | Nov 30, Dec 6, 8 | Dec 10 | Chameleon | Mitch Beasley, USA (1) | Open event. $20,000 first prize. |
| PBA Scorpion Championship | Dec 25 E | Reno, NV | Dec 1, 7, 8 | Dec 10 | Scorpion | Tommy Jones, USA (18) | Open event. $20,000 first prize. |
| PBA Shark Championship | Dec 25 E | Reno, NV | Dec 2, 7, 8 | Dec 10 | Shark | François Lavoie, Canada (2) | Open event. $20,000 first prize. |
| **PBA World Championship** | Dec 11 E | Reno, NV | Nov 29 – Dec 5 | Live | World Championship Custom | E. J. Tackett, USA (5) | Open event for WSOB entrants. PBA major. $60,000 top prize. |
| PBA-WBT Qatar Open | N/A | Doha, Qatar | Dec 10–15 | Dec 16 | | Diana Zavjalova, Latvia (NQ) | WBT and PBA title event. $40,000 top prize. |

- C: broadcast on CBS Sports Network
- E: broadcast on ESPN
- E2: broadcast on ESPN2
- X: broadcast on the PBA's Xtra Frame webcast service
- *Tournament finals were held in December 2015, but this counts as a 2016 season title. There was an earlier Mark Roth-Marshall Holman doubles tournament in February 2015 that counted as a 2015 title.
- (NQ) Accepted 8 pins handicap per game offered to female competitors by the tournament committee, and thus was not eligible to earn a PBA or WBT title.
- (a) Denotes amateur bowler; did not qualify for a PBA title.
- + The Dallas Strikers earned an additional $10,000 for rolling a perfect game in the semifinal round.
- # François Lavoie earned an additional $10,000 for rolling a perfect game in the semifinal match.
