= 2025 PBA Tour season =

- League: Professional Bowlers Association
- Sport: Ten-pin bowling
- Duration: January 20–August 31

PBA Tour

PBA Tour seasons
- ← 2024 2026 →

The 2025 PBA Tour season, the 66th season of play for the U.S. Professional Bowlers Association's ten-pin bowling tour, began on January 20 with the pre-tournament qualifier (PTQ) of the PBA Delaware Classic. The season was composed of 18 Tour title events, which included 16 singles events (nine standard, five major, two postseason), 2 doubles title events, and a non-title team event.

On October 31, 2024, the PBA and Fox announced that the 2025 season will have over 60 hours of live coverage on Fox and FS1 networks. Fox terrestrial stations will have seven broadcasts, with the remaining broadcasts of regular season events on FS1. An additional nine hours of televised matches at the PBA Tour Finals (June 7–8) will be broadcast on CBS Sports Network.

After the end of the 2025 regular season came news that this would be the last PBA season on Fox and Fox Sports 1, the contract having ended. PBA Commissioner Tom Clark made the official announcement live at the PBA Playoffs finale on May 24. On April 30, 2025, the PBA had announced that The CW had acquired the television rights to air ten live PBA Tour events on consecutive Sunday afternoons, beginning in 2026. The PBA then announced on May 29 that all events of the 2026 and 2027 PBA World Series of Bowling will be covered on CBS stations. CBS Sports Network will have live coverage of four animal pattern events (including play-ins), while CBS terrestrial stations will host live coverage of the PBA World Championship finals. In addition, the PBA Tour Finals, which has aired on CBS Sports Network since the 2017 season, will return to that network in 2026 with a new format and new name: PBA Commissioner's Cup.

== Season overview ==
As in 2024, the final rounds of all five major events were broadcast live on over-the-air network television (Fox network). This included the finals of the U.S. Open on February 2, the PBA World Championship (part of the five-event PBA World Series of Bowling XVI in Reno, Nevada) on March 22, the USBC Masters on March 30, the PBA Players Championship on April 13, and the PBA Tournament of Champions on April 20. All five majors paid out a $100,000 top prize.

Fox networks also aired a PBA All-Star Weekend in Waukesha, Wisconsin and a new PBA Elite League Battle of the Brands in Allen Park, Michigan. Following the 2025 regular season was the PBA Playoffs, April 28–30 (broadcast on weekends May 3–18, with a live final on May 24), also in Allen Park, Michigan.

The PBA Elite League retained the regular season-long format from 2024, but teams were now made up of players represented by bowling ball manufacturers. Parent companies Brunswick (Brunswick, Hammer, DV8, Ebonite*) and Storm (Storm, Roto Grip, 900 Global) each had multiple teams, while independent brand MOTIV had one team. Selected players for their brands (brand managers choose five players prior to each week's matches) earn points during the first 13 singles events of the season. Points then determine seeding for the PBA Elite League Battle of the Brands Championship on April 26–27.

- *Ebonite team includes players sponsored by Ebonite, Track or Columbia 300.

=== Season awards ===
- Chris Schenkel PBA Player of the Year: E. J. Tackett (86.5% of votes)
- Harry Golden PBA Rookie of the Year: Ryan Barnes (82.0% of votes)
- Steve Nagy PBA Sportsmanship Award: Deo Benard (76.67% of votes)
- Tony Reyes PBA Community Service Award: Chris Via
- Harry Smith PBA Points Leader Award: E. J. Tackett (34,690 points)
- George Young PBA High Average Award: E. J. Tackett (228.60)

== Tournament summary ==
The events held during the 2025 PBA season are shown below. Major tournaments are in bold. Career PBA title numbers for winners are shown in parentheses (#). Winner's share prize money is shown in US dollars ($), except where indicated. The number shown with oil pattern names is the oil length in feet.

Tour points are awarded for most events. Besides the season-ending Harry Smith PBA Points Winner award, points are one consideration for Player of the Year voting and also affect eligibility and seeding for the PBA Playoffs (2025 points only) and PBA Tour Finals (with 2024 points). Starting this season, individual points for the season's first 13 singles events also determine seeding for the PBA Elite League Battle of the Brands Championship.

- Tier 3: PBA short format or limited field tournaments (2500 points for first, and descending thereafter)
- Tier 2: PBA standard tournaments with an open field (double the points of Tier 3 events)
- Tier 1: PBA major tournaments (triple the points of Tier 3 events)

Source for table below:

Event	Airdate	City	Preliminary rounds	Final round	Oil pattern	Winner	Notes
PBA Delaware Classic	Jan 25 FS1	Middletown, DE	Jan 21–24 (PTQ: Jan 20)	Live	Cheetah 35	Graham Fach, Canada (2)	Open event (Tier 2). $30,000 top prize.
**U.S. Open presented by Go Bowling**	Feb 1 (prelims) FS1; Feb 2 (finals) Fox	Indianapolis, IN	Jan 27–Feb 1 (PTQ: Jan 26)	Live	Four custom patterns	E. J. Tackett, USA (24)	Open event (Tier 1). PBA major. $100,000 top prize.
PBA Owen's Illinois Classic	Feb 8 FS1	Vernon Hills, IL	Feb 4–7 (PTQ: Feb 3)	Live	Carmen Salvino 42	Santtu Tahvanainen, Finland (1)	Open event (Tier 2). $30,000 top prize.
PBA Pete Weber Missouri Classic	Feb 16 FS1	Springfield, MO	Feb 12–15 (PTQ: Feb 11)	Live	Dick Weber 45	E. J. Tackett, USA (25)	Open event (Tier 2). $30,000 top prize.
PBA Roth-Holman Doubles Championship	Mar 2 FS1 (taped)	Vernon Hills, IL	Feb 4–7 (PTQ: Feb 3)	Feb 8	Mark Roth 43 (left lane); Marshall Holman 38 (right lane)	Jason Belmonte, Australia (32) & Bill O'Neill, USA (15)	Open event (Tier 3-limited field). $50,000 top prize (team).
PBA Mike Aulby Nevada Classic presented by Pilgrim's	Mar 15 FS1	Sparks, NV (qualifying & match play); Reno, NV (finals)	Feb 26–Mar 1 (PTQ: Feb 25)	Live	Mike Aulby 39	Andrew Anderson, USA (5)	Open event (Tier 2). $30,000 top prize.
PBA WSOB XVI Scorpion Championship	Mar 16 FS1	Reno, NV	Mar 4–5, 16 (WSOB PTQ: Mar 3)	Live	Scorpion 44	Rasmus Edvall, Sweden (1)	Open event (Tier 3-short format). $20,000 top prize.
PBA WSOB XVI Viper Championship	Mar 17 FS1	Reno, NV	Mar 6–7, 17 (WSOB PTQ: Mar 3)	Live	Viper 38	Darren Ong, Singapore (1)	Open event (Tier 3-short format). $20,000 top prize.
PBA WSOB XVI Chameleon Championship	Mar 18 FS1	Reno, NV	Mar 8–9, 18 (WSOB PTQ: Mar 3)	Live	Chameleon 41	Tun Hakim, Malaysia (1)	Open event (Tier 3-short format). $20,000 top prize.
PBA WSOB XVI Shark Championship	Mar 19 FS1	Reno, NV	Mar 10–11, 19 (WSOB PTQ: Mar 3)	Live	Shark 47	E. J. Tackett, USA (26)	Open event (Tier 3-short format). $20,000 top prize.
**PBA World Championship**	Mar 22 (finals) Fox	Reno, NV	Mar 4–11, 14–15, 20 (WSOB PTQ: Mar 3)	Live	Qualifying: 4 WSOB Animal Patterns Advancers round, match play & finals: Earl Anthony 43	E. J. Tackett, USA (27)	PBA members & qualifying collegiate players via PTQ (Tier 1). PBA major. Top 1 in 4 qualifiers from animal pattern events (48 total games) bowl 16 more games in advancers round March 14–15. Top 16 after 64 games advance to match play on March 20. Top five after match play seeded for finals. $100,000 top prize.
**USBC Masters**	Mar 29 (prelims) FS1; Mar 30 (finals) Fox	Allen Park, MI	Mar 23–29	Live	USBC Custom	Gary Haines, USA (1)	Open event (Tier 1). PBA major. $100,000 top prize.
PBA All-Star Weekend Powered by QubicaAMF	Apr 5–6 FS1	Waukesha, WI	N/A	N/A	PBA LBC 42	One-handers vs. Two-Handers: One-handers win 3 games to 1 (E. J. Tackett, Andrew Anderson, Graham Fach, Kristopher Prather, Jakob Butturff) Strike Derby: E. J. Tackett	Non-title events. April 5: Top five one-handed bowlers and top five two-handed bowlers in YTD points compete in Baker doubles. April 6: Strike derby, with one player from each PBA Elite League team selected by fan vote March 23–28 (plus defending champion Jesper Svensson). All events utilize lanes with certified QubicaAMF string pinspotters.
**PBA Players Championship**	Apr 12 (prelims) FS1; Apr 13 (finals) Fox	Jackson, MI	Apr 8–12 (PTQ: Apr 7)	Live	Don Carter 37	Ethan Fiore, USA (1)	PBA members-only event (Tier 1-PBA major). $100,000 top prize.
**PBA Tournament of Champions Powered by 1800 Tequila**	Apr 19 (prelims) FS1; Apr 20 (finals) Fox	Fairlawn, OH	Apr 15–19 (PTQ: Apr 14)	Live	Don Johnson 40	Jesper Svensson, Sweden (13)	Invitational event (Tier 1). PBA major. $100,000 top prize.
PBA Elite League Battle of the Brands Championship Powered by Beatbox	Apr 26: 4–8 seeds play-in round FS1; Apr 27: finals stepladder with play-in winner joining top 3 seeds Fox	Allen Park, MI	Reg. Season (13 events)	Live	PBA LBC 42	Storm (Kyle Troup, Chris Via, Jason Belmonte, Jesper Svensson, François Lavoie)	Teams composed of players represented by bowling ball parent sponsors Brunswick (four teams) and Storm (three teams), plus independent brand MOTIV (one team). Points earned during regular season events determine seeding. $100,000 top prize to winning team.
PBA Playoffs	Round 1/Group 1 (5, 8, 9, 12 seeds): May 3 FS1; Round 1/Group 2 (6, 7, 10, 11 seeds): May 4 FS1; Group 1 Quarterfinals: May 10 FS1; Group 2 Quarterfinals: May 11 FS1; Semifinals: May 18 FS1; Finals: May 24 Fox	Allen Park, MI	Apr 28–30	Live	Bat 37 & Billy Hardwick 44	Jesper Svensson, Sweden (14)	Invitational event. Starting field: top 12 in 2025 Tour points through April 20. Top 4 automatically advance to quarterfinals. $100,000 top prize.
PBA Tour Finals	June 7 (Groups 1 & 2 seeding rounds) CBS Sports; June 8 (Group stepladders & finals) CBS Sports	Bethlehem, PA	June 7	Live	Amleto Monacelli 40 & Johnny Petraglia 46	Andrew Anderson, USA (6)	Invitational event. Starting field: top eight points earners since start of 2024 season, split into two groups (1-4-5-8 seeds and 2-3-6-7 seeds). Groups bowl separate seeding and stepladder rounds, with each group's winner advancing to finals. $35,000 top prize.
PBA-PWBA Striking Against Breast Cancer Mixed Doubles (a.k.a. The Luci)	Jul 27 BowlTV	Houston, TX	Jul 24–26	Live	Custom Kegel pattern	Chris Via, USA (2) & Bryanna Coté, USA	PBA and PWBA title event. $25,000 top prize (team).
PBA-WBT Storm Lucky Larsen Masters	Lucky Larsen Masters YouTube channel	Helsingborg, Sweden	Aug 22–Aug 30	Aug 31	Not reported	Sean Rash, USA (18)	PBA and WBT title event (Tier 3–limited field). 165,000 SEK top prize (approx. $17,500 USD).
