= Shawn Maldonado =

Right-handed American ten-pin bowler (born 1986)

Personal information
- Born: Houston, Texas, U.S.
- Years active: 2013–present

Bowling Information
- Affiliation: PBA
- Rookie year: 2014
- Dominant hand: Right (two-handed delivery)
- Wins: 2 PBA Tour; 20 PBA Regional Tour
- Sponsors: Hammer Bowling, VISE Grips

Shawn Maldonado (born 1986) is an American right-handed professional ten-pin bowler from Houston, Texas, who joined the Professional Bowlers Association in 2013. He owns two national PBA Tour titles, and has also won 20 PBA Regional Tour titles.

Maldonado uses a two-handed shovel-style delivery. Unusual for this style, he originally put his thumb in the ball. However, he converted to a no-thumb delivery in October 2020.

Maldonado is a national pro staff member for Hammer Bowling, after previously being sponsored by Storm. He is also sponsored by VISE Grips.

== Personal life ==
Maldonado was born in 1986 in Houston, Texas. He started bowling at the age of two. His parents used to bowl on a league three or more nights a week, so he was introduced to bowling at a very young age. Similar to Jason Belmonte's starting story, the bowling balls were too heavy for him to lift with one hand on his own, so he learned to use two hands to bowl, and used a thirteen-step approach.

Maldonado is married and has four children, Dominic, Mia, Shawn Jr (SJ), and Ace. Outside of bowling, he enjoys watching his son play baseball, while Shawn himself likes exercising and playing Chess, Billiards, Dominoes, Backgammon, Basketball and Tennis. Being born in Houston, he is a big fan of all Houston sports teams. His favorite food is Italian.

== Professional career ==
Maldonado joined the PBA in 2013, but did not participate full-time on the PBA Tour until the 2015 season, during which he made his first two televised finals appearances. He made it to the semifinal match of the 2016 U.S. Open, but was the victim of a televised 300 game by François Lavoie.

He broke through with his first national PBA title in the 2021 PBA Chameleon Championship, part of that season's PBA World Series of Bowling. He later won the 2021 PBA Lubbock Sports Open.

Maldonado had a third-place finish in the 2022 PBA Tournament of Champions. He qualified as the #15 seed for the 2022 PBA Playoffs. After an upset win over #2 seed Anthony Simonsen in the opening round, he was defeated by tenth-seeded A. J. Johnson in the quarterfinals.

At the 2023 PBA Dave Small's Jackson Classic, Maldonado made the stepladder finals (broadcast on BowlTV) and rolled the first 11 strikes in his opening match before leaving two pins with a light hit on his final shot for a 298 game. He would lose the semifinal match to eventual winner E. J. Tackett to finish in third place.

Maldonado and partner D.J. Archer have made the televised finals of the PBA Roth-Holman Doubles Championship five times, but hadn't earned a final round match win until defeating Sean Rash and Matt Ogle in the 2025 semifinals. However, they would lose the title match to Jason Belmonte and Bill O'Neill.

Maldonado has earned over $550,000 in PBA events through the 2026 season.

=== Accomplishments and honors ===
- 2x Texas Masters champion
- 16 PBA Regional titles
- 2014 and 2015 PBA Southwest Region Player of the Year
- 2016 PBA Elias Cup Champion with the Dallas Strikers (PBA League team)
- 2021 PBA Chameleon Championship winner
- 2021 PBA Lubbock Sports Open winner
