= A. J. Johnson (bowler) =

Right-handed American ten-pin bowler (born 1992)

AJ Johnson
Personal information
- Born: September 3, 1992 (age 33) Oswego, Illinois, U.S.
- Years active: 2015–present

Bowling Information
- Affiliation: PBA
- Rookie year: 2015
- Dominant hand: Right (power stroker delivery)
- Wins: 1 PBA Tour; 11 PBA Regional Tour; 1 KPBA Tour
- Sponsors: MOTIV Bowling, Turbo grips
Medal record
Men's bowling
Pan American Games
Gold medal – first place	2023 Santiago	Singles
World Bowling Championships
Gold medal – first place	2017 Las Vegas	Team
Bronze medal – third place	2017 Las Vegas	All Events
PABCON Men's Championships
Gold medal – first place	2019 Lima	Team
Gold medal – first place	2019 Lima	All Events
Silver medal – second place	2019 Lima	Singles
IBF Super World Championships
Gold medal – first place	2021 Dubai	Trios
PANAM Bowling Champion of Champions
Gold medal – first place	2022 Rio de Janeiro	Doubles
Bronze medal – third place	2022 Rio de Janeiro	Singles
Bronze medal – third place	2022 Rio de Janeiro	All-Events

Adam "A. J." Johnson (born September 3, 1992) is an American professional bowler from Oswego, Illinois, now living in Kenosha, Wisconsin. He has been a member of the Professional Bowlers Association (PBA) since 2015. He won his first PBA Tour title in 2023. He also competes internationally as a multi-year and current member of Team USA.

Johnson is a member of the MOTIV Bowling pro staff. He is also sponsored by Turbo grips.

== Amateur career ==
Johnson bowled collegiately for McKendree University, where he earned first-team All-American and MVP honors in the 2013–14 season. In 2013, he was a member of Junior Team USA. He won the 2013 Junior Gold Championships as a youth bowler for the United States. He has been a five-time member of Team USA. At the 2019 PABCON Championships in Lima, Peru, he won gold in team and all events, and silver in singles. He previously won gold in team and bronze in all events at the 2017 World Bowling Championships.

In 2015, Johnson entered the USBC Masters as an amateur and earned the #1 seed in qualifying, but he would lose the final match to Jason Belmonte.

Johnson was part of the rotating four-person team (with Jakob Butturff, Andrew Anderson and Kristopher Prather) that won the trios gold medal for Team USA at the 2021 International Bowling Federation (IBF) Super World Championships in Dubai. With the final match between USA and South Korea ending in a tie, Johnson was chosen by coach Bryan O'Keefe to roll the tenth frame of a ninth/tenth frame roll-off, which USA won 57–49.

On August 23, 2022, Johnson and partner Kris Prather won gold medals in Doubles at the PanAm Bowling Champion of Champions event held in Rio de Janeiro, Brazil. With an eight-game total of 1,921 pins (240.13 average), Johnson topped the men's field for the event. He and Prather were part of a USA sweep in Doubles, as Shannon O'Keefe and Bryanna Coté won Doubles gold in the women's event. Johnson settled for bronze medals in the Singles and All Events categories, finishing third in both behind teammate Prather and Brazil's Bruno Costa.

== Professional career ==
Johnson is a three-time PBA Midwest Region Player of the Year (2017, 2018 and 2020)., and he won the 2019 KPBA SamHo Cup, a Korean PBA event. He has won 11 PBA Regional Tour titles. Through his first seven years on the PBA Tour, he had six runner-up finishes, including finishing second while bowling as an amateur at the 2015 USBC Masters major.

In 2021, Johnson teamed with former NFL star Terrell Owens to win Chris Paul's annual CP3 PBA Celebrity Invitational pro-am event. Johnson qualified as the #3 seed for the 2022 U.S. Open finals, but lost his only match to Jason Belmonte.

Based on points earned during the first 13 events of the 2022 PBA Tour season, Johnson qualified as the #10 seed for the PBA Tour Playoffs. After defeating #7 seed Jakob Butturff in the Round of 16 and #15 seed Shawn Maldonado in the quarterfinals, Johnson was eliminated in the semifinals by sixth-seeded Tommy Jones. Despite no titles, Johnson cashed a career-high $92,700 in 2022.

On September 10, 2023, Johnson won his first PBA title at the Storm Lucky Larsen Masters in Helsingborg, Sweden. After knocking off American Anthony Simonsen in the semifinals, AJ topped Swedish standout Jesper Svensson in the finals.

Johnson suffered his seventh career runner-up finish at the 2024 PBA Illinois Classic, losing to top seed Marshall Kent. He was a member of the Las Vegas High Rollers PBA Elite League team, which won the 2024 Elias Cup championship.
