= 2019 PBA Tour season =

- League: Professional Bowlers Association
- Sport: Ten-pin bowling
- Duration: January 2, 2019 – November 21, 2019

PBA Tour
- Season MVP: Jason Belmonte

PBA Tour seasons
- ← 2018 2020 →

The 2019 PBA Tour season, the 60th season of play for the U.S. Professional Bowlers Association's ten-pin bowling tour, began in January 2019 with the PBA Hall of Fame Classic in Arlington, Texas. The season schedule had 27 singles title events, two doubles title events, and two non-title team events.

The 2019 season introduced major changes, with Fox Sports assuming the media and sponsorship rights to the PBA Tour, as well as the introduction of a revamped PBA Tour Playoffs as a 24-player, bracketed elimination tournament. Another big change came later in the year, when the PBA was purchased by Bowlero Corporation.

== Media rights ==
On March 21, 2018, Fox Sports announced that it had acquired the television rights for the PBA Tour, replacing ESPN, with a commitment for 26 broadcasts on Fox Sports 1 and four on the Fox broadcast network beginning in 2019 (totalling 58 hours, in comparison to the 30 hours of coverage provided by ESPN linear channels in 2018). To launch its coverage, Fox broadcast an invitational event, the PBA Clash, on December 23, 2018. Fox will air four events per-season, including the CP3 PBA Celebrity Invitational (which aired on the afternoon of Super Bowl LIII). Fox and FS1 have aired 14 final rounds live during the 2019 season, as compared to the four live broadcasts aired on ESPN in 2018. Fox Sports also assumed the role of sponsorship sales for the tour. The PBA saw the deal as an effort to increase media exposure for the tour and its top players.

In a similar manner to Fox's 2016 acquisition of NHRA drag racing, Fox focused on developing new on-air features and technology to improve viewer understanding of the intricacies of the sport, and additional shoulder content. One such feature is StrikeTrack, a graphic (based on technology from the company Kegel) that displays the trajectory, speed, and rotation (RPM) of the ball as it travels down the lane. Broadcasting & Cable considered this feature akin to the infamous "FoxTrax" used during Fox's National Hockey League coverage in the 1990s.

On August 15, the PBA and Fox announced the return of the PBA Clash, the fifth 2019 event to air on Fox television. The November 3 broadcast (tape-delayed from October 21) will feature the top eight 2019 money leaders through September 21 vying for a $50,000 top prize.

The PBA reported ratings growth in the first year of its contract; the Tournament of Champions finals broadcast on Fox was its highest-rated first-run telecast of the season, at 1,132,000 viewers. Including first-run and rerun broadcasts, the association reported that total viewership of all PBA telecasts on Fox networks through the PBA Tour Playoffs had seen an 85% increase in viewership over 2018, with the ten playoffs broadcasts being seen by at least 7.941 million.

== Tournament schedule ==
On August 28, 2018, the PBA announced that all events televised on Fox and FS1, except for the USBC Masters, will only be open to members of the association. The USBC Masters has traditionally allowed qualifying USBC members who may not be PBA members to participate, and will continue to do so. PBA Xtra Frame Tour, PBA Regional Tour and PBA50 Tour events will also continue to allow qualifying non-members to participate.

The 2019 PBA Tournament of Champions and PBA Players Championship majors were held in February. In order to include it in Fox's new contract, the PBA's World Series of Bowling X (which included three standard PBA title events and the PBA World Championship — the season's third major) was postponed for 2018 and moved to March 2019, with live finals broadcasts occurring in prime time across four consecutive nights. For the first three majors of 2019 and the PBA Indianapolis Open, Fox and the PBA offered a $1 million bonus for any player who rolls a 300 game in the televised title match. Of the PBA's 26 televised 300 games, only two came in the title match, and neither of these was in a major tournament.

The season's fourth major, the USBC Masters, took place March 26–April 1 in Las Vegas. The U.S. Open, the season's final major, was contested October 23–30 in Mooresville, North Carolina.

A new PBA Playoffs event featured the top 24 players in points after the first 13 events of the 2019 season (through the USBC Masters), and offered a $100,000 top prize. The single-elimination tournament was set up in a split format, with the elimination rounds held April 8–10 and the final four competing in two live broadcasts on June 1 and 2.

The PBA League team event, which has been held since the 2012–13 season, continued into 2019. For the first time, all rounds of this tournament aired in live broadcasts, between July 16 and July 18.

As in the previous two seasons, CBS Sports Network carried the PBA Tour Finals, which took place July 20 and 21 in Las Vegas. (PBA Commissioner Tom Clark later announced an agreement with CBS Sports Network to cover the PBA Tour finals through the 2022 PBA season.) The tournament retained a similar format as in 2018, with eight top players seeded into two groups of four. The main difference for 2019 is that the eight players were determined based on Tour points ranking since the beginning of the 2018 season. (In previous PBA Tour Finals, the eight bowlers were chosen and seeded based on Tour earnings, not points.) CBS Sports Network broadcast an unprecedented nine hours of live coverage over the two days.

The PBA Xtra Frame summer tour returned with some additional incentives. Renamed the USBC Cup tour, this consisted of nine title events in seven cities, beginning with the PBA Lubbock Sports Shootout in late June and concluding with the three-event PBA Summer Swing on August 24–31. All events aired live on the FloBowling Xtra Frame webcast service. The top five PBA members in points over these nine events shared in a $40,000 bonus pool, with the top points earner (Sean Rash) winning a $20,000 bonus and the honor of USBC Cup champion. In addition, the top eight PBA members over these events earned berths in the FloBowling PBA ATX Summer Tour Finals on September 21 and the PBA China Tiger Cup on November 19–21. In the China Tiger Cup, the eight players will join eight Chinese PBA members in singles and team matches at the first PBA event to ever be held in China.

== 2019 Highlights ==
=== Player awards ===
Player awards for the 2019 season were announced on December 11, 2019.

- Chris Schenkel PBA Player of the Year: Jason Belmonte
- Harry Golden PBA Rookie of the Year: Mykel Holliman
- Steve Nagy PBA Sportsmanship Award: Martin Larsen
- Tony Reyes PBA Community Service Award: Chuck Gardner

=== Records and additional highlights ===
- Jason Belmonte won four tournaments on the season, two of them majors. With his second major win of the season at the PBA World Championship, Belmonte surpassed Earl Anthony and Pete Weber to become the PBA's all-time leader in major tournament wins (11).
- Norm Duke won back-to-back tournaments at the PBA Indianapolis Open and PBA Jonesboro Open, becoming the third bowler in history to reach the 40 career titles plateau, after Walter Ray Williams Jr. and Earl Anthony.
- After finishing runner-up in three previous major tournaments, Jakob Butturff finally won his first major at the USBC Masters.
- Kristopher Prather won the largest prize check of the season ($100,000) at the inaugural PBA Tour Playoffs. Qualifying as the #9 seed, Prather defeated #7 seed Bill O'Neill in the double-elimination final on June 2.

== Tournament summary ==
The 2019 PBA tournament schedule is shown below. Major tournaments are in bold. Career PBA title numbers for winners are shown in parentheses (#). Prize money is shown in US dollars.

Tour points are awarded for most events. Besides the season-ending Harry Smith PBA Points Winner award, points are one consideration for Player of the Year voting, and also affect eligibility for the PBA Playoffs, PBA Tour Finals (combined with 2018 points), PBA China Tiger Cup (USBC Cup event points only) and the 2020 DHC PBA Japan Invitational. Points for tournaments are awarded differently based on a "tier" system. The tier of each qualifying tournament is shown in the Notes column on the tournament schedule, and is explained below.

- Tier 3: PBA short format or limited field tournaments (2500 points for first, and descending thereafter)
- Tier 2: PBA standard tournaments with a fully open field (double the points of Tier 3 events)
- Tier 1: PBA major tournaments (triple the points of Tier 3 events)

Event	Airdate	City	Preliminary rounds	Final round	Oil pattern	Winner	Notes
PBA Hall of Fame Classic	Jan 6 FS1	Arlington, TX	Jan 2–5	Live	Carmen Salvino 44	Bill O'Neill, USA (10)	Open event (Tier 3–limited field). $25,000 top prize.
PBA Oklahoma Open	Jan 13 FS1	Shawnee, OK	Jan 8–12	Live	Mark Roth 42	Jakob Butturff, USA (5)	Open event (Tier 2). $25,000 top prize.
Roth-Holman PBA Doubles Championship	Jan 20 FS1	Shawnee, OK	Jan 8–9, 11–12	Jan 13	Mark Roth 42	Sean Rash, USA (13) and Matt Ogle, USA (1)	Open event (Tier 3–limited field). $25,000 top prize.
PBA Lubbock Sports Open	Jan 27 FS1	Lubbock, TX	Jan 22–26	Live	Scorpion 42 (left lane) & Wolf 32 (right lane)	Dick Allen, USA (6)	Open event (Tier 2). $25,000 top prize.
**PBA Tournament of Champions**	Feb 10 Fox	Fairlawn, OH	Feb 5–9	Live	Don Johnson 40	Jason Belmonte, Australia (19)	Invitational event (Tier 1). PBA major. $50,000 top prize.
**PBA Players Championship**	Feb 17 FS1	Columbus, OH	Feb 12–16	Live	Dragon 45	Anthony Simonsen, USA (6)	Open event (Tier 1). PBA major. $50,000 top prize.
Go Bowling! PBA Indianapolis Open	Feb 24 FS1	Indianapolis, IN	Feb 19–23	Live	Dick Weber 45 (left lane) & Mike Aulby 38 (right lane)	Norm Duke, USA (39)	Open event (Tier 2). $30,000 top prize.
PBA Jonesboro Open	Mar 3 FS1	Jonesboro, AR	Feb 26 – Mar 2	Live	Shark 48 (left lane) & Viper 36 (right lane)	Norm Duke, USA (40)	Open event (Tier 3–limited field). $25,000 top prize.
World Bowling Tour (WBT) Finals	Mar 10 FS1	Arlington, TX	2017–18 WBT events	Jan 6	Seoul 39	Men: E. J. Tackett; Women: Liz Johnson	Non-title event. $12,500 top prize.
PBA WSOB X Cheetah Championship	Mar 18 FS1	Allen Park, MI	Mar 12, 18	Live	Cheetah 33	Dick Allen, USA (7)	Open event (Tier 3–short format). $20,000 top prize.
PBA WSOB X Chameleon Championship	Mar 19 FS1	Allen Park, MI	Mar 13, 19	Live	Chameleon 39	Jason Belmonte, Australia (20)	Open event (Tier 3–short format). $20,000 top prize.
PBA WSOB X Scorpion Championship	Mar 20 FS1	Allen Park, MI	Mar 14, 20	Live	Scorpion 42	Kristopher Prather, USA (1)	Open event (Tier 3–short format). $20,000 top prize.
**PBA World Championship**	Mar 21 FS1	Allen Park, MI	Mar 12–16	Live	Qualifying: Cheetah, Chameleon, Scorpion; Cashers round thru finals: Earl Anthony 43	Jason Belmonte, Australia (21)	Open event for WSOB X entrants (Tier 1). PBA major. $60,000 top prize.
USA vs. The World	Mar 22 FS1	Allen Park, MI	Mar 12–14	Mar 21	Mark Roth 42	The World team: Pontus Andersson (Sweden), Sam Cooley (Australia), Dom Barrett (England), Andres Gomez (Colombia), and Jason Belmonte (Australia)	Non-title team event, held at WSOB X. Participants (5 each team) based on 30 qualifying games from Cheetah, Chameleon and Scorpion events. $40,000 prize to winning team.
**USBC Masters**	Apr 1 FS1	Las Vegas, NV	Mar 27–31	Live	USBC Masters (39-foot custom pattern)	Jakob Butturff, USA (6)	Open event (Tier 1). PBA major. $30,000 top prize.
2019 PBA Tour Playoffs	Rd. of 24 (1): Apr 8 FS1; Rd. of 24 (2): Apr 15 FS1; Rd. of 16 (1): Apr 22 FS1; Rd. of 16 (2): Apr 29 FS1; Rd. of 16 (3): May 6 FS1; Rd. of 16 (4): May 13 FS1; Quarterfinal 1: May 20 FS1; Quarterfinal 2: May 27 FS1; Final Four: Jun 1 Fox; Finals: Jun 2 Fox	Portland, ME	Apr 8–10	Live	Don Carter 39	Kristopher Prather, USA (2)	Top 24 in points through YTD 2019 events, with the top 8 earning byes into the Round of 16. $100,000 top prize.
PBA DHC Japan Invitational	Apr 28 Xtra Frame	Tokyo, Japan	Apr 25–27	Live	Dragon 45	Jason Belmonte, Australia (22)	Invitational event. ¥5 million (approx. $44,650) first prize.
PBA Lubbock Sports Shootout	Jun 30 Xtra Frame	Lubbock, TX	Jun 28–29	Live	Billy Hardwick 44	Jakob Butturff, USA (7)	Open USBC Cup title event (Tier 3–short format). $13,500 top prize.
PBA League	Quarterfinals 1: Jul 16 FS1; Quarterfinals 2: Jul 16 FS1; Semifinals: Jul 17 FS1; Finals: Jul 18 FS1	Portland, ME	Jul 16–17	Live	Mark Roth 42	Portland Lumberjacks: Wes Malott (MVP), Kyle Troup, Ryan Ciminelli, Kris Prather and Mitch Hupé. Captain–Tim Mack.	Non-title PBA team event. $60,000 top prize.
Barbasol PBA Tour Finals	Jul 21 CBS Sports	Las Vegas, NV	Jul 20–21	Live	Mark Roth 42	E. J. Tackett, USA (13)	Invitational event. Top 8 in points from start of 2018 season through 2019 USBC Masters. $30,000 top prize.
Storm PBA/PWBA Striking Against Breast Cancer Mixed Doubles	Jul 28 Xtra Frame	Houston, TX	Jul 26–27	Live	Not reported	Kyle Sherman, USA (1) and Amanda Greene, USA	Open PBA and PWBA title event. USBC Cup event (Tier 3–short format). $20,000 top prize.
PBA Harry O'Neale Chesapeake Open	Aug 11 Xtra Frame	Chesapeake, VA	Aug 9–10	Live	Mike Aulby 38	Bill O'Neill, USA (11)	Open USBC Cup title event (Tier 3–short format). $10,000 top prize.
PBA Wilmington Open	Aug 14 Xtra Frame	Wilmington, NC	Aug 12–13	Live	Chameleon 39	BJ Moore, USA (1)	Open USBC Cup title event (Tier 3–short format). $10,000 top prize.
PBA Gene Carter's Pro Shop Classic	Aug 18 Xtra Frame	Middletown, DE	Aug 16–17	Live	Earl Anthony 43	Ryan Ciminelli, USA (8)	Open USBC Cup title event (Tier 3–short format). $10,000 top prize.
PBA Bowlerstore.com Classic	Aug 23 Xtra Frame	Coldwater, OH	Aug 21–22	Live	Del Ballard 34	Tommy Jones, USA (19)	Open USBC Cup title event (Tier 3–short format). $10,000 top prize.
FloBowling PBA Summer Swing Wolf Open	Aug 27 Xtra Frame	Aurora, IL	Aug 24–PTQ; 26–27	Live	Wolf 32	Sean Rash, USA (14)	Open USBC Cup title event (Tier 3–short format). $10,000 top prize.
FloBowling PBA Summer Swing Bear Open	Aug 29 Xtra Frame	Aurora, IL	Aug 24–PTQ; 28–29	Live	Bear 41	Anthony Simonsen, USA (7)	Open USBC Cup title event (Tier 3–short format). $10,000 top prize.
FloBowling PBA Summer Swing Illinois Open	Aug 31 Xtra Frame	Aurora, IL	Aug 26–31	Live	Bear 41 (left lane) & Wolf 32 (right lane)	Jason Sterner, USA (3)	Open USBC Cup title event (Tier 2). Top 24 in pinfall from Wolf & Bear qualifying make the starting field. $20,000 top prize.
PBA-WBT Lucky Larsen Masters	N/A	Helsingborg, Sweden	Sep 2–8	Sep 9	Not reported	Carsten Hansen, Denmark (1)	PBA and WBT title event (Tier 3–limited field). $15,408 top prize.
FloBowling PBA ATX Summer Tour Finals	Sep 21 Xtra Frame	Austin, TX	N/A	Live	Dick Weber 45	Bill O'Neill, USA	Non-title event. Top 8 PBA Players from USBC Cup events. $25,000 top prize.
PBA-WBT Thailand Open	N/A	Bangkok, Thailand	Sep 22–27	Sep 28	Not reported	Jesper Svensson, Sweden (8)	PBA and WBT title event (Tier 3–limited field). ฿1,000,000 ($32,258) top prize.
**75th U.S. Open**	Oct 30 CBS Sports	Mooresville, NC	Oct 23–29	Live	U.S. Open (4 custom patterns)	François Lavoie, Canada (4)	Open event (Tier 1). PBA major. $30,000 top prize.
PBA Clash	Nov 3 Fox	Lake Wales, FL	N/A	Oct 21	Billy Hardwick 44 (left lane) & Johnny Petraglia 37 (right lane)	Jakob Butturff, USA	Non-title event. Top 8 2019 money leaders through Sep. 21 PBA ATX Summer Tour Finals. $50,000 top prize.
PBA-WBT Kuwait Open	N/A	Kuwait City	Oct 31–Nov 5	Nov 6	Not reported	Dom Barrett, England (8)	PBA and WBT title event (Tier 3–limited field). $50,000 top prize.
PBA China Tiger Cup	Nov 21 Xtra Frame	Suzhou, China	Nov 19–20	Live	Not reported	Sean Rash, USA	Non-title event. Top 8 PBA Players from USBC Cup events, plus 8 Chinese PBA members. $20,000 (USD) first prize.
