= Graham Fach =

Canadian ten-pin bowler

Personal information
- Born: December 10, 1991 (age 34) Guelph, Ontario, Canada
- Years active: 2014−present
- Height: 173 cm (5 ft 8 in)

Bowling Information
- Affiliation: PBA
- Rookie year: 2016
- Dominant hand: Left (stroker delivery)
- Wins: 3 PBA Tour (1 major); 17 PBA Regional Tour
- Sponsors: Brunswick, VISE Grips, H5G

Graham Fach (born December 10, 1991) is a left-handed Canadian professional ten-pin bowler from Guelph, Ontario, now living in Urbana, Ohio, US. A member of the Professional Bowlers Association (PBA), he is known for being the first Canadian bowler to win a PBA Tour title, which he accomplished at the 2016 PBA Players Championship major event. He won additional PBA Tour titles in 2025 and 2026, and has 17 PBA Regional Tour titles.

He has also bowled internationally for Team Canada.

Fach is a pro staff member for Brunswick, after previously being sponsored by MOTIV. He is also sponsored by VISE Grips inserts and High 5 Gear sportswear.

== Amateur career ==
Fach bowled for Urbana University in Urbana, Ohio. He was a second team NCBCA All-American in the 2014–15 season, and was the MVP of the 2015 Intercollegiate Bowling Championships despite his team finishing runner-up.

He is a four-time member of Team Canada, including placing first in singles at the 2022 and 2025 Canadian Team Trials. His international medals include:

- Bronze in teams (2018 World Championships)
- Silver in doubles, bronze in singles (2022 World Games)
- Silver in trios and all-events, bronze in doubles (2023 Pan American Games)

== Professional bowling career ==
Following college, Fach became a member of the PBA in 2016. He made a splash in just his second PBA Tour event, winning the Barbasol PBA Players Championship, a PBA major. In the final match over top seed Ryan Ciminelli, Fach rolled 11 strikes en route to a 279–244 victory, only a 7-pin in the seventh frame keeping him from a perfect game. This made him the first-ever Canadian player to win a PBA major, as well as the first to win a PBA title of any kind on the national tour.

Fach then went through seven seasons of struggles, making only four more championship round appearances (usually the final five) through the 2023 season. In the 2024 season, he showed marked improvement despite not winning a title. He cashed 11 times in 15 events, finishing 14th on the Tour points list while earning a career-high $97,375.

In the opening event of the 2025 season, Fach finally ended his title drought, taking the championship at the PBA Delaware Classic. Climbing from the #3 seed, he rolled games of 249 and 256 before defeating top seed Jakob Butturff by a decisive 277–200 score. Fach had eight top-ten finishes and five top-five finishes in 2025, while ranking fourth in points and sixth in earnings with a new career-high of $147,925.

On March 1, 2026, Fach won his third PBA Tour title at the PBA Pete Weber Missouri classic. As the #2 seed, he topped Denmark's Thomas Larsen in the semifinal match before defeating top seed Justin Knowles, 258–196, for the title. Fach was a member of The World team, which defeated the USA team in the "USA vs. The World" non-title event on April 4. For the 2026 season, he finished eighth in points (the highest among left-handed players) and ninth in earnings with $114,250.

Fach has also won 17 PBA Regional Tour titles, and is a three-time PBA Central Region Player of the Year (2018, 2022, 2025).

Since Fach's victory in January 2016, three other Canadian players have won titles on the PBA Tour. François Lavoie of Quebec has won six titles on Tour, his first coming late in the 2016 season. Mitch Hupé of Manitoba earned one title in the 2023 season, while Zach Wilkins of Ontario won two titles in 2026.

=== PBA Tour titles ===
Major championships are in bold text.

1. 2016: **Barbasol PBA Players Championship** (Columbus, Ohio)
2. 2025: PBA Delaware Classic (Middletown, Delaware)
3. 2026: PBA Pete Weber Missouri Classic (St. Peters, Missouri)

== Awards and achievements ==
- First Canadian player to ever win a PBA Tour national title
- Three-time PBA Central Region Player of the Year (2018, 2022, 2025)
- 2022 and 2025 Canadian Adult Male Bowler of the Year

== Personal ==
He is married and has two children.
