= Jesper Svensson (bowler) =

Swedish professional bowler (born 1995)

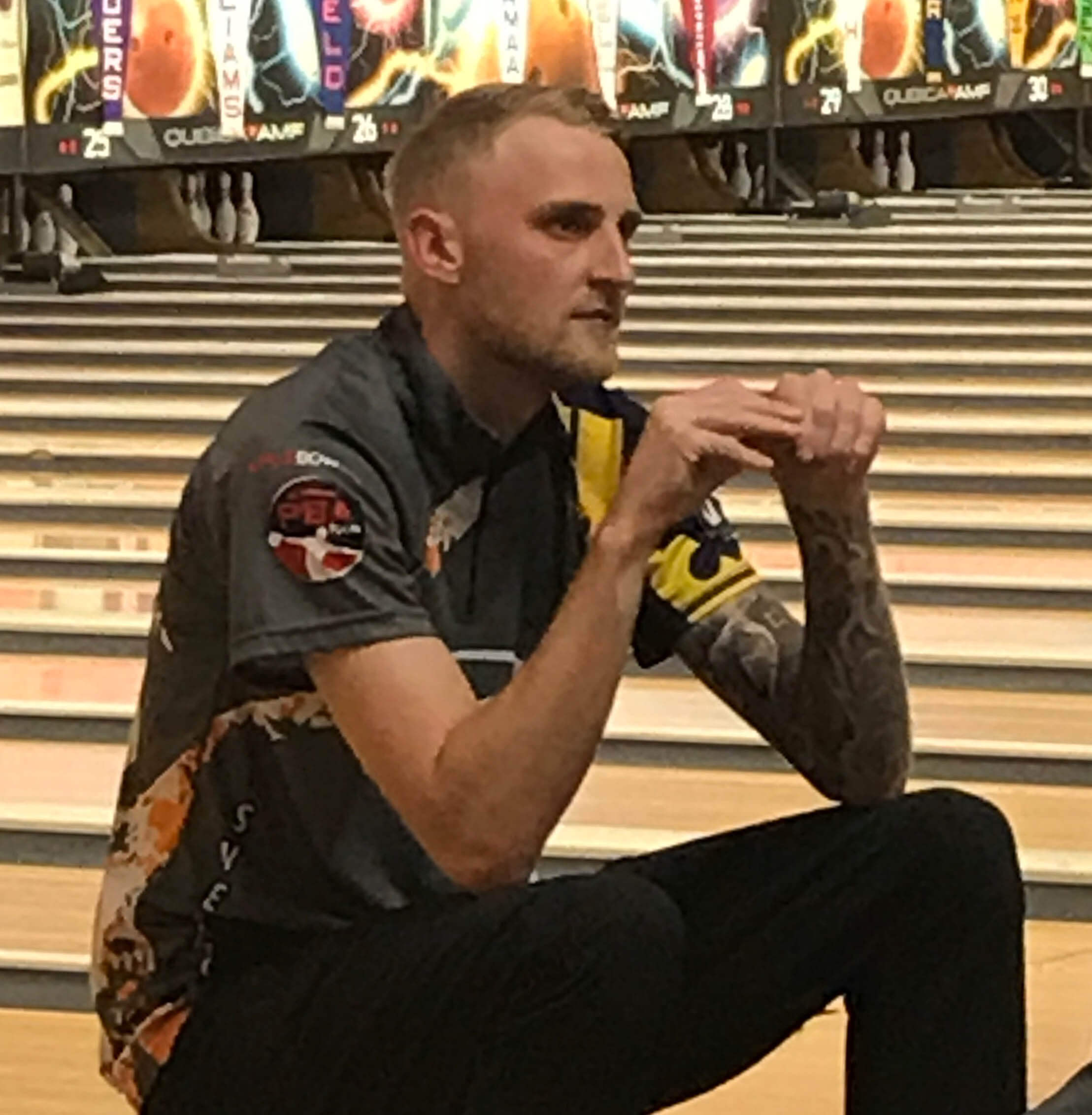
- Svensson in 2019

Personal information
- Nickname: Iceman
- Born: 15 February 1995 (age 31) Vimmerby, Sweden
- Years active: 2014–present
- Height: 1.93 m (6 ft 4 in)

Sport
- Country: Sweden
- Sport: Ten-pin bowling
- League: PBA, EBT
- Turned pro: 2014

Achievements and titles
- World finals: 6 European Bowling Tour; 4 PBA Tour (international)
- National finals: 14 PBA Tour (2 majors) 2015 PBA Rookie of the Year; 2016 PBA George Young High Average Award

Jesper Svensson (Swedish: [ˈjɛ̌sːpɛr svɛnsɔn]; born 15 February 1995) is a Swedish professional tenpin bowler. He has been a member of the Professional Bowlers Association (PBA) since 2014, and also competes on the European Bowling Tour (EBT). He has won fourteen PBA Tour titles overall, including two major titles at the 2016 and 2025 PBA Tournament of Champions. He also owns six EBT titles and one PBA Regional title. He is known for using the two-handed shovel style delivery with a dominant left hand. He uses non-reactive urethane bowling balls almost exclusively. Svensson is a member of the Storm and Vise Grips pro staffs.

During the 2017 PBA season, ESPN and CBS Sports Network bowling analyst Randy Pedersen gave Svensson the nickname Iceman for the Swede's cool, calm demeanor under pressure.

== Amateur accomplishments ==
Before turning pro, Svensson was the 2014 World Youth Masters champion, and won numerous other medals in World Youth competition.

== PBA career ==
=== 2015 season ===
Svensson won his first career PBA Tour title at the 2015 PBA-WBT Kingdom of Bahrain Open on March 7. He followed that up with a win in the PBA Chameleon Championship at the PBA World Series of Bowling on December 18. Svensson was honored as the 2015 PBA Rookie of the Year.

=== 2016 season ===
Having qualified for his very first PBA Tournament of Champions, Svensson won the event held in Shawnee, Oklahoma on February 7, 2016. In doing so at age 20, he became the youngest-ever winner in this PBA major tournament, which dates back to 1962. Marshall Holman had previously held this distinction when he won the 1976 Tournament of Champions at age 21. Svensson won two more PBA titles in 2016, at the Brunswick Euro Challenge (Munich) and the World Bowling Tour Thailand event (Bangkok), giving him five PBA titles overall.

=== 2017 season ===
Svensson's sixth PBA title came on April 16, 2017 in the Mark Roth-Marshall Holman PBA Doubles Championship, where he teamed with right-handed two-hander Kyle Troup for the title. As one of the top eight money leaders from the start of the 2015 season through the 2017 USBC Masters, Svensson was invited to participate in the inaugural Main Event PBA Tour Finals in May, 2017. Jesper placed third in the event. On November 19, Svensson won his seventh PBA Tour title in the PBA Cheetah Championship, part of the World Series of Bowling in Reno, NV.

=== 2018 season ===
Svensson qualified as the #1 seed in the 2018 PBA Tournament of Champions, but finished runner-up after losing the title match to Matt O'Grady. He was a member of the Go Bowling! Silver Lake Atom Splitters team, which won the PBA League event on April 22, 2018.

=== 2019 season ===
Svensson won his eighth PBA Tour title at the PBA-WBT Thailand Open. After qualifying as the top seed, Jesper defeated American Sean Rash in the final match.

=== 2020 season ===
On February 29, Svensson won his ninth PBA Tour title at the 2020 Roth-Holman Doubles Championship held in Indianapolis with doubles partner Kyle Troup. This was the second doubles title for the Svensson-Troup duo, who previously won the event in 2017. Later that day, Svensson won the 2020 PBA Indianapolis Open. As the #1 seed for the stepladder finals, he defeated Shawn Maldonado in the championship match 245–226 to claim his tenth PBA Tour title, which made him title-eligible for the PBA Hall of Fame.

=== 2021 season ===
Svensson was winless in the 2021 PBA Tour season, though his consistency helped him top $100,000 in only 12 events.

=== 2022 season ===
On February 9, 2022, Svensson won his eleventh PBA Tour title in the David Small's Best of the Best Championship, held in Jackson, Michigan. Having qualified as the top seed, he defeated fellow lefty Packy Hanrahan in his lone finals match by a score of 248–216 to claim the victory.

In the 2022 PBA Playoffs, the 14th-seeded Svensson stunned #3 seed E. J. Tackett two points to one to advance to the Round of 8. He was then defeated by #6 seed Tommy Jones, also by a two points to one score.

=== 2023 season ===
Svensson made four match play rounds and one championship round appearance in a winless 2023 PBA Tour season.

=== 2024 season ===
Svensson qualified as the #10 seed for the 2024 PBA Playoffs. He defeated #7 seed Matt Russo, #2 seed Marshall Kent and #6 seed Kyle Troup to make it to the final match against #9 seed David Krol. The two players each won one game in the "race to two points" final, but Krol won the ninth/tenth frame roll-off, 48–40, to deny Svensson the title.

On September 1, 2024, Svensson earned his 12th PBA Tour title, winning the Storm Lucky Larsen Masters in Helsingborg, Sweden.

On September 17 (broadcast October 27 on Fox in the US), Svensson won the PBA Elite League Strike Derby. Svensson defeated Andrew Anderson in the final round, rolling 12 strikes in two minutes to top Anderson's 11 strikes.

For the season, Svensson finished tenth in Tour points and cashed a career-high $168,636.

=== 2025 season ===
After a slow start to the 2025 season (no top-ten finishes in the first five events), Svensson made the top 25 in all five PBA World Series of Bowling events. His earnings put him over the $1 million mark for his career.

On April 20, 2025, Svensson earned his 13th PBA Tour title and second major championship, winning the PBA Tournament of Champions as he did for his first major back in 2016. Qualifying as the top seed, Svensson defeated fellow lefty Jakob Butturff in his lone finals match, 221–197, to take the title and $100,000 top prize.

On May 24, 2025, Svensson claimed his second $100,000 prize check of the season, winning the PBA Playoffs. He climbed from the #7 seed in the bracketed format, eventually defeating top seed E. J. Tackett in the "race to three points" final round, three games to one.

Despite his slow start, Svensson finished the season second in earnings ($271,100) and seventh in points.

Despite being just 4 years old at the turn of the century, Svensson ranked #15 on the PBA's 2025 "Best 25 PBA Players of the Last 25 Seasons" list. The ranking was based on a points system that took into account standard titles, major titles, top-five finishes and Player of the Year awards.

=== 2026 season ===
On February 15, 2026, Svensson was named a captain's selection by Jason Belmonte for the USA vs. The World team match on April 4.

== Professional wins ==
=== PBA Tour wins (14) ===
Legend
Major championships (2)
Japan Invitational (0)
World Series of Bowling (2)
PBA Tour standard events (10)

No.	Date	Tournament	Championship Match	Runner(s)-up	Money ($)
1	7 Mar, 2015	Kingdom of Bahrain International Bowling Championship	258–244	(Australia) Jason Belmonte	25,000
2	18 Dec, 2015	PBA Chameleon Championship	267–193	(Germany) Pascal Winternheimer	20,000
3	7 Feb, 2016	PBA Tournament of Champions	226–177	(United States) Mitch Beasley	50,000
4	20 Mar, 2016	Brunswick Euro Challenge	228–222	(Sweden) Martin Larsen	12,770
5	12 Aug, 2016	World Bowling Tour Thailand	237–213	(Australia) Sam Cooley	32,260
6	16 Apr, 2017	Roth/Holman PBA Doubles Championship (with Kyle Troup)	279–195	(United States) E. J. Tackett & (United States) Marshall Kent	24,000 (12,000 each)
7	19 Nov, 2017	PBA Cheetah Championship	245–194	(Denmark) Thomas Larsen	20,000
8	28 Sep, 2019	World Bowling Tour Thailand	211–181	(United States) Sean Rash	32,258
9	29 Feb, 2020	Roth/Holman PBA Doubles Championship (with Kyle Troup)	234–205	(United States) E. J. Tackett & (United States) Marshall Kent	30,000 (15,000 each)
10	29 Feb, 2020	PBA Indianapolis Open	245–226	(United States) Shawn Maldonado	30,000
11	9 Feb, 2022	Storm Cup: PBA David Small's Best of the Best Championship	248–216	(United States) Packy Hanrahan	20,000
12	1 Sep, 2024	Storm Lucky Larsen Masters	257–238	(Sweden) Teodor Samuelsson	15,385
13	20 Apr, 2025	PBA Tournament of Champions	221–197	(United States) Jakob Butturff	100,000
14	24 May, 2025	PBA Playoffs	217–208; 225–220; 216–246; 246–226	(United States) E. J. Tackett	100,000

=== Non-title PBA wins ===
1. 2024 PBA Elite League Strike Derby
2. 2025 PBA Elite League Battle of the Brands Championship (member of champions Team Storm)

== Professional accomplishments and records ==
- 2015 PBA Rookie of the Year
- Youngest-ever winner in the PBA Tournament of Champions (20 years, 357 days)
- First player to have five PBA Tour titles by age 21 (joined by Anthony Simonsen in 2018)
- Named Sweden's 2016 Rookie Sportsman of the Year
- 2016 PBA George Young High Average Award winner (226.07 average over 324 PBA Tour games)
- Ranked #15 on the PBA's 2025 "Best 25 PBA Players of the Last 25 Seasons" list

== World Series of Bowling ==
=== Wins (2) ===
Year	Championship	Final score	Runner-up	Earnings ($US)
2015	Chameleon Championship	267-193	(Germany) Pascal Winternheimer	20,100
2017	Cheetah Championship	245-194	(Denmark) Thomas Larsen	20,000

=== Results timeline ===
Results not in chronological order.

Tournament	2014	2015	2016	2017	2018	2019	2020	2021	2022	2023	2024	2025	2026
Cheetah Championship	24	18	43	1	NH		14	36	14	15	10	NH	34
Viper Championship	41	114	Not Held									13	NH
Chameleon Championship	63	1	11	5	NH		5	38	Not Held			7	111
Scorpion Championship	69	118	3	24	NH		6	85	13	3	4	23	2
Shark Championship	Not Held		129	7	Not Held				63	50	26	5	98
Doubles Championship	NH	Not Included						4	35	NI	5	NI	

Win
Top 10

"T" = Tied for a place

== PBA career statistics ==
Statistics are through the last complete PBA season.

Season	Events	Cashes	Match Play	CRA+	PBA Titles (majors)	Average	Earnings ($US)
2014	5	2	0	0	0	218.17	3,150
2015	9	6	2	2	2	225.81	57,870
2016	18	11	8	5	3 (1)	226.07	138,380
2017	16	12	9	5	2	226.88	128,816
2018	15	8	4	2	0	212.95	60,323
2019	23	8	6	4	1	213.23	76,058
2020	12	10	9	3	2	223.72	88,650
2021	12	8	7	3	0	215.77	102,100
2022	13	10	7	2	1	217.50	66,900
2023	18	15	12	2	0	217.18	83,850
2024	16	15	9	5	1	225.41	168,636
2025	16	12	7	4	2 (1)	222.05	271,100
Totals	173	102	80	37	14 (2)	---	1,245,833

+CRA = Championship Round Appearances

== Personal ==
In addition to bowling, Svensson enjoys soccer and ice hockey.
