= Ryan Ciminelli =

American professional bowler

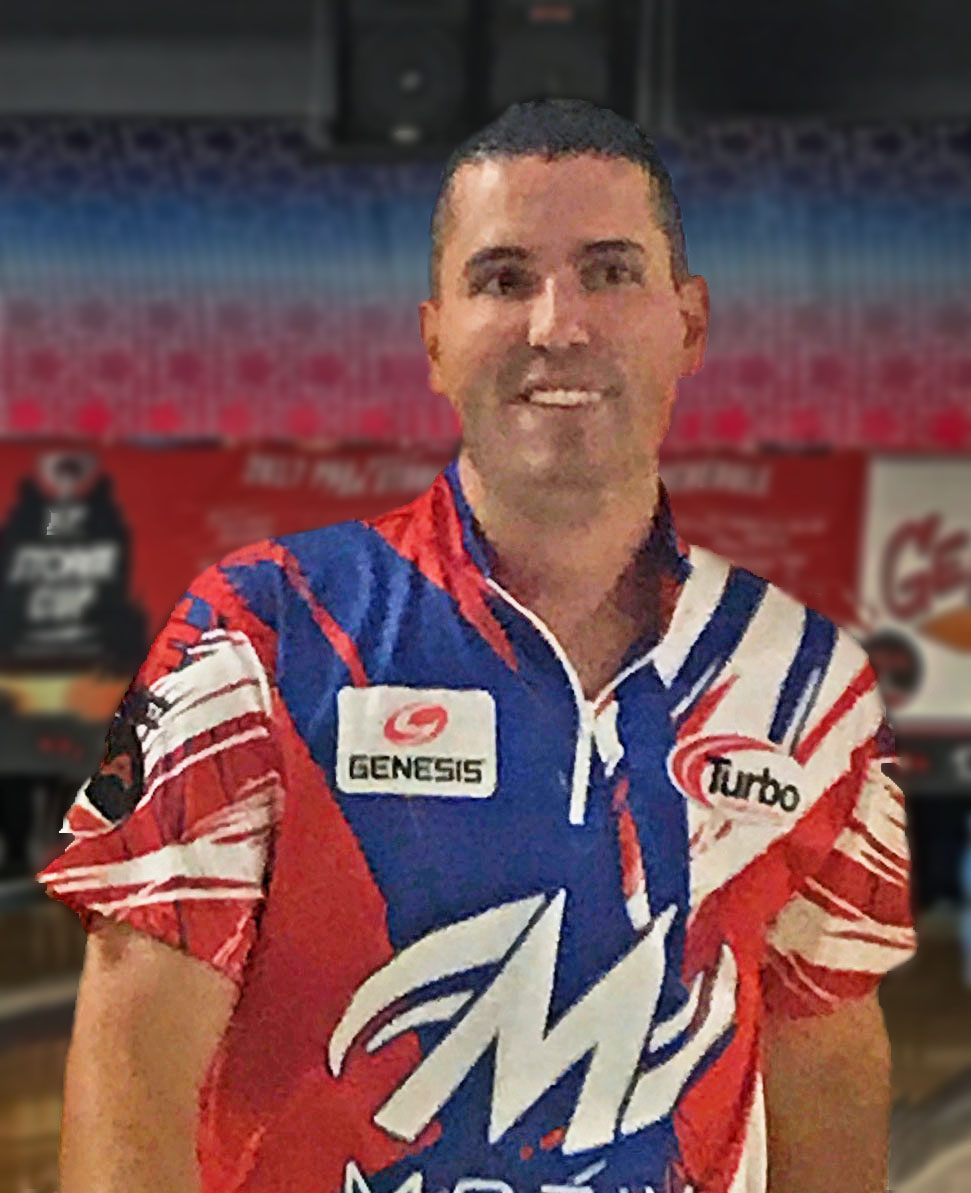
- Born: Ryan Ciminelli; March 7, 1986 (age 40); Cheektowaga, New York, U.S.
- Other names: The Ryan Express, Hit Man
- Occupation: Ten-pin bowler
- Years active: 2007–present
- Notable work: 8 PBA Tour wins (1 major); 14 PBA Regional Tour wins 2023 PBA League MVP
- Height: 175 cm (5 ft 9 in)
- Spouse: Chelsie

Ryan Ciminelli (born March 7, 1986) is a left-handed ten-pin bowler originally from Cheektowaga, New York. Since 2007, he has competed on the Professional Bowlers Association (PBA) Tour. Ciminelli has won eight PBA Tour titles, including one major championship, in addition to 14 PBA Regional Tour titles. He has earned over $700,000 on Tour through the 2020 season, and has rolled 15 perfect 300 games in PBA competition. Ciminelli was runner-up for PBA Player of the Year in the 2015 season. He was given the nickname "The Ryan Express" in the 2012 Tournament of Champions TV introductions, while his DV8 bio listed the nickname "Hit Man".

Ciminelli was a pro staff member for the DV8 division of Brunswick for the first nine seasons of his career before signing a sponsorship agreement with MOTIV bowling balls on June 2, 2017. Ryan announced he had left the MOTIV pro staff on July 25, 2019. After a year as a free agent looking for a ball rep, he was re-signed by DV8. He is also sponsored by Turbo grips and Genesis kinesiology tape.

== Ciminelli on the PBA Tour ==
=== Early years ===
Ciminelli joined the PBA in 2007. From 2007 through 2009, he bowled mostly on the PBA Regional Tour. On the national Tour during this stretch, he made match play six times in 36 tournaments and failed to make the TV finals in any event.

=== 2009–10 season ===
2009–10 proved to be his first productive season, as Ryan made match play in six of 17 events as a non-exempt player. He made the TV finals four times, but failed to win a title. Ciminelli finished third at the 2009 Regional Players Invitational to earn an exemption for the 2010–11 PBA Tour season.

=== 2010–11 season ===
Ciminelli's first PBA Tour title came at the 2011 Earl Anthony Memorial Classic in Dublin, California, where he defeated Patrick Allen in the final match, 237–215.

=== 2011–12 season ===
Ciminelli's win in 2011 qualified him for the 2012 PBA Tournament of Champions where he finished runner-up, losing in the final match against Sean Rash, 239–205. Despite not winning a title this season, Ryan posted his best earnings to date, taking home $64,545.

=== 2012–13 season ===
On November 3, 2013 (broadcast December 15, 2013), Ciminelli rose from the #3 seed and bested #1 seed Dominic Barrett, 258–203, in the title match at the PBA Chameleon Championship in Las Vegas, Nevada. Ciminelli overwhelmed the three right-handed bowlers he faced in the TV finals, and took home $20,000 in prize money while collecting his second PBA title. Celebrating the victory, Ciminelli kissed his bride-to-be, Chelsie, and then handed the trophy to his father, Angelo.

=== 2014 season ===
Ciminelli took a step backward in 2014, making match play in just two of 15 events while appearing in the TV finals only once, coming away without a title.

=== 2015 season ===
Ciminelli made the TV finals in the Tournament of Champions for a second time in 2015, only to have his opponent (Sean Rash) roll a 300 game against him in the opening match.

Ciminelli collected his third PBA Tour title at the PBA Xtra Frame South Point Las Vegas Open on October 22, 2015. Qualifying as the #2 seed, Ryan defeated his boyhood idol, 52-year old Parker Bohn III, in the semifinal match, and went on to defeat #1 seed and fellow New Yorker Anthony Pepe in the finals, rolling 10 strikes en route to a convincing victory.

Seventeen days after winning his third title, Ciminelli collected his fourth title and first major championship at the 2015 Bowlmor AMF U.S. Open, held in Garland, Texas. Qualifying as the #1 seed in the grueling 56-game format, Ryan defeated Dominic Barrett in his lone TV finals match to take home the prestigious green jacket and $50,000.

At the 2015 PBA World Series of Bowling in Reno, NV, Ciminelli qualified as the #2 seed in the Rolltech PBA World Championship, but was upset in the semifinals on December 17 by eventual winner Gary Faulkner, Jr. On December 18, Ryan picked up his fifth career title in the finals of the GoBowling.com Viper Championship, defeating Thailand's Kim Bolleby, 237–201. This made Ciminelli the only player to win three titles in the 2015 season. He had his best season in earnings, by far, taking home $142,661.

In an extremely close vote, Ciminelli was runner-up to Jason Belmonte for the 2015 Chris Schenkel PBA Player of the Year award. Ciminelli earned 43.22 percent of the vote, on the strength of three titles (one major) and a 225.37 average. Belmonte won two titles (both majors), led the PBA Tour in earnings, and barely edged Ciminelli in Tour average (225.40), getting 47.36 percent of the vote.

=== 2016 season ===
Ciminelli made a bid for his second PBA major title in February, 2016, but finished runner-up to Canadian Graham Fach in the PBA Players Championship. He earned his sixth career PBA Tour title at the BowlingBall.com Xtra Frame Maine Shootout on April 6, 2016. Ciminelli won his second title of 2016 and seventh overall on October 2 at the PBA Xtra Frame Parkside Lanes Open in Aurora, Illinois.

=== 2017 season ===
As one of the top eight money leaders from the start of the 2015 season through the 2017 USBC Masters, Ryan was invited to participate in the inaugural Main Event PBA Tour Finals in May, 2017. Ciminelli placed fifth in the event. Ciminelli made the semifinals of the 2017 PBA World Championship, getting knocked out in heartbreaking fashion. In his second match of the stepladder, he tied eventual winner Jason Belmonte 257–257, but lost 9–7 in a one-ball sudden death roll-off.

=== 2018 season ===
Ciminelli had a difficult 2018 season, failing to qualify for a championship round for the first time since 2008–09.

=== 2019 season ===
Ryan was a member of the Portland Lumberjacks team, winners of the 2019 PBA League competition. Ciminelli won his eighth PBA Tour title on August 18 at the PBA Gene Carter's Pro Shop Classic. The win came fresh off Ciminelli's suspension from the previous two PBA Tour events, which the PBA handed down for negative comments Ryan made about PBA lane oiling conditions during a bowling-related podcast.

=== 2020 season ===
Ciminelli’s best performance during the 2020 season came at the PBA Oklahoma Open, where he qualified as the top seed for the finals but lost the championship match to Sean Rash.

On July 6, 2020, Ciminelli announced that he was retiring from full-time competition on the PBA Tour to further pursue his career in construction management, stating he accepted a position as a commercial masonry project manager. Ryan noted he would honor his 2020 PBA League team commitment, and will still compete in limited PBA events as his schedule permits. "Hopefully, I'm not done winning on Tour," he added, "I'll just have fewer opportunities to do so."

=== 2021 season ===
Exactly one year after announcing his retirement from full-time PBA Tour competition, Ciminelli announced he would return to full-time touring status, stating, "Thanks to my wonder woman boss of a wife killing it in her field, I am able to get back to bowling."

=== 2022 season ===
Ciminelli struggled through the 2022 PBA Tour season, cashing only four times in 12 events.

=== 2023 season ===
Ciminelli won the 2023 PBA League Elias Cup team title with the Waco Wonders, and was named league MVP. As the team's anchor bowler (bowling the fifth and tenth frames), he struck on 23 of his 33 shots during the event.

=== 2025 ===
Ciminelli ranked #21 on the PBA's 2025 "Best 25 PBA Players of the Last 25 Seasons" list. The ranking was based on a points system that took into account standard titles, major titles, top-five finishes and Player of the Year awards.

== World Series of Bowling ==
=== Wins (2) ===
Year	Championship	Final score	Runner-up	Earnings ($)
2013	Chameleon Championship	258-203	(England) Dom Barrett	20,000
2015	Viper Championship	237-201	(Thailand) Kim Bolleby	20,000

=== Results timeline ===
Results not in chronological order.

Tournament	2008	2009	2010	2011	2012	2013	2014	2015	2016	2017	2018	2019	2020
Cheetah Championship	87	2	28	23	12	113	82	74	44	5	NH	73	17
Viper Championship	60	2	111	13	74	2	71	1	Not Held				
Chameleon Championship	93	36	113	55	155	1	22	11	130	11	NH	43	61
Scorpion Championship	7	85	128	33	42	79	93	26	48	54	NH	56	26
Shark Championship	69	75	75	44	Not Held				45	42	Not Held		

Win
Top 10
Did not play

"T" = Tied for a place

== Career PBA victories ==
=== PBA Tour titles ===
Major titles in bold text.

1. 2011 Earl Anthony Memorial Classic (Dublin, CA)
2. 2013 PBA Chameleon Championship (Las Vegas, NV)
3. 2015 PBA Xtra Frame South Point Las Vegas Open (Las Vegas, NV)
4. **2015 Bowlmor AMF U.S. Open** (Garland, TX)
5. 2015 GoBowling.com PBA Viper Championship (Reno, NV)
6. 2016 BowlingBall.com Xtra Frame Maine Shootout (Portland, ME)
7. 2016 PBA Xtra Frame Parkside Lanes Open (Aurora, IL)
8. 2019 PBA Gene Carter's Pro Shop Classic (Middletown, DE)

=== PBA non-title wins ===
1. 2023 PBA Elias Cup champion w/Waco Wonders (finals MVP)

== Career PBA statistics ==
Statistics are through the last complete PBA Tour season.

Season	Events	Cashes	Match Play	CRA+	PBA Titles	Average	Earnings ($)
2007–08	17	8	3	0	0	210.77	12,635
2008–09	19	11	3	0	0	207.22	15,940
2009–10	17	9	6	4	0	218.70	57,775
2010–11	12	6	3	2	1	217.91	51,350
2011–12	14	10	5	3	0	225.93	64,545
2012–13	24	16	9	3	1	218.38	57,942
2014	15	8	2	1	0	217.41	52,827
2015	19	11	9	5	3	225.37	142,661
2016	21	9	7	4	2	219.76	67,775
2017	20	10	7	3	0	218.80	74,705
2018	16	8	4	0	0	212.16	31,820
2019	22	6	4	1	1	209.95	28,905
2020	14	6	3	1	0	--	30,700

+CRA = Championship Round Appearances

== Personal ==
Ciminelli attended Erie Community College in Williamsville, New York where he earned a degree in construction engineering and project management. He spent time as a construction laborer while refining his bowling game. He now resides in Monroe, North Carolina.
