= Kristopher Prather =

American ten-pin bowler (b. 1992)

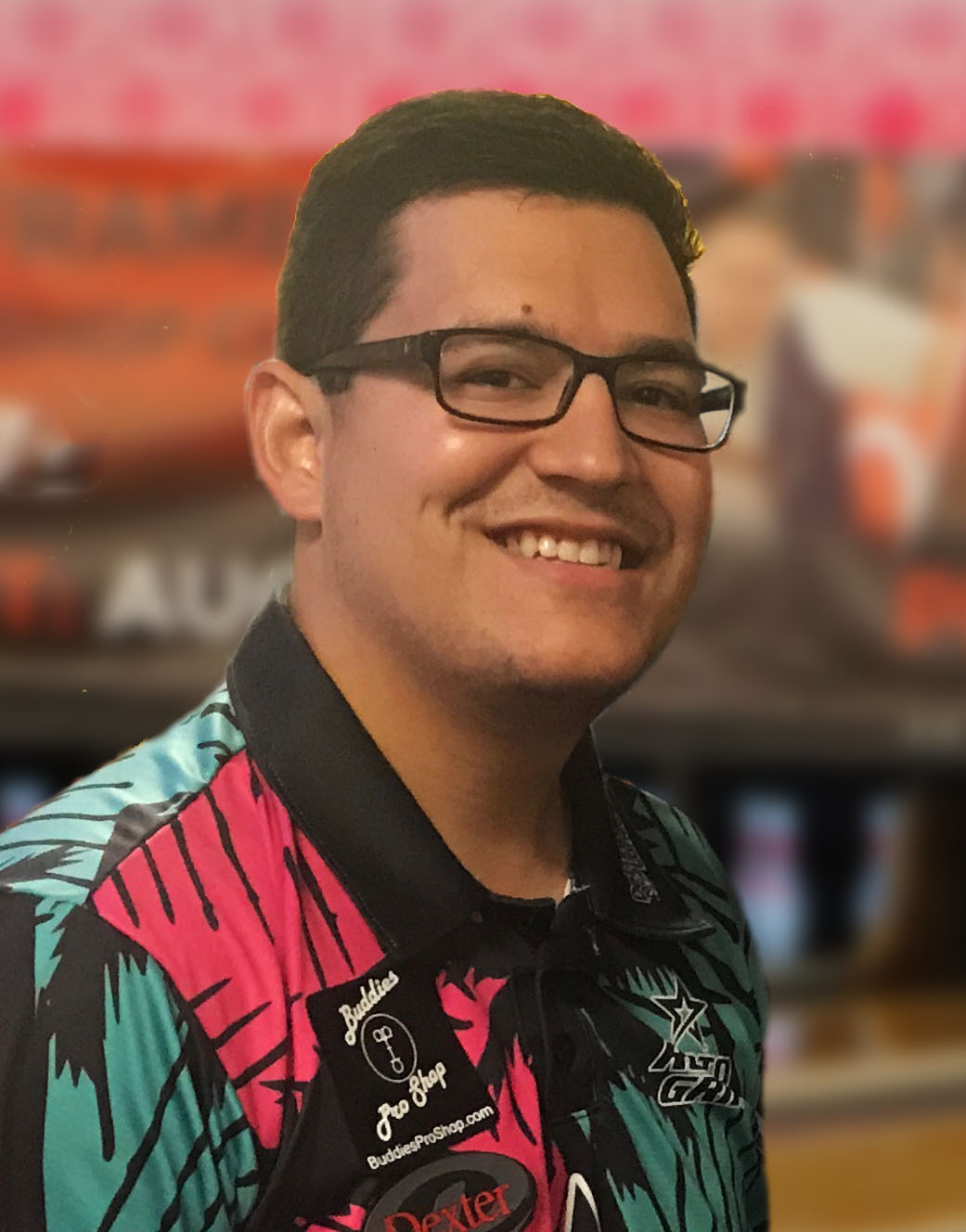
- Prather in 2019

Personal information
- Born: January 1, 1992 (age 34)
- Years active: 2015–present

Bowling Information
- Affiliation: PBA
- Rookie year: 2015
- Dominant hand: Right (cranker delivery)
- Wins: 6 PBA Tour (2 majors); 2 PBA Regional Tour
- 300-games: 26 (USBC Sanctioned)
- Sponsors: Roto Grip bowling balls, Vise Grips

Medal record

Men's bowling

Representing United States

IBF Super World Championships
Gold medal – first place	2021 Dubai	Trios

PanAm Bowling Champion of Champions
Gold medal – first place	2022 Rio de Janeiro	Doubles
Gold medal – first place	2022 Rio de Janeiro	Singles
Gold medal – first place	2022 Rio de Janeiro	All Events

Kristopher "Kris" Prather (born January 1, 1992) of Romeoville, Illinois is an American professional ten-pin bowler who competes on the PBA Tour. He is known for winning the inaugural PBA Playoffs in 2019, and for his two major titles: the 2020 PBA Tournament of Champions and the 2022 PBA World Championship. He has won six PBA Tour titles overall. Prather is also a multi-year and current member of Team USA.

Prather has been nicknamed "Shark" and "Shark Kent" (a play on Clark Kent). He is a member of the Roto Grip and Vise Grips pro staffs.

== Amateur career ==
Prather bowled collegiately at Wichita State University in Wichita, Kansas. As an amateur, he won the 2012 Paragon Open in Grand Rapids, Michigan and finished second at the 2012 New Mexico Open.

As of January 2020, Prather is a member of Team USA. Prather was part of the rotating four-person team (with A. J. Johnson, Jakob Butturff and Andrew Anderson) that won the trios gold medal for Team USA at the 2021 International Bowling Federation (IBF) Super World Championships in Dubai.

On August 23, 2022, Prather and partner A. J. Johnson won Doubles gold for USA at the PanAm Bowling Champion of Champions event held in Rio de Janeiro, Brazil. He and Johnson were part of a USA sweep in Doubles, as Shannon O'Keefe and Bryanna Coté won Doubles gold in the women's event. Prather then won gold in Singles on August 25, which also earned him All-Events gold.

== Professional career ==
After qualifying for the championship finals four times in 2018 and twice more in early 2019 without winning, Prather broke through with his first PBA title in the PBA Scorpion Championship, held at the 2019 World Series of Bowling in Allen Park, Michigan. Based on points earned during the first 13 events of the 2019 season, he qualified as the #9 seed for the inaugural PBA Tour Playoffs. He was the only player to make the final four who did not earn a first-round bye. He defeated #4 seed Anthony Simonsen in the semifinal round on June 1, then topped #7 seed Bill O'Neill on June 2 to take the championship and $100,000 first place prize. Originally, the PBA Tour Playoffs was considered a non-title event. However, on December 6, 2019, the PBA announced that Prather would retroactively be awarded a PBA title for his win, giving him his second career Tour title.

Prather was a member of the Portland Lumberjacks team, winners of the 2019 PBA League competition. He was again a member of the Lumberjacks when they successfully defended their PBA League title in 2020.

On February 9, 2020, Prather won the PBA Tournament of Champions held in Fairlawn, Ohio. As the #4 seed for the stepladder finals, he won all four matches, defeating four major titlists (Sean Rash, Jason Belmonte, Anthony Simonsen and Bill O'Neill) to capture his third PBA Tour title, first major, and second career $100,000 prize check.

On June 6, 2020, Prather won the PBA Strike Derby, a non-title made-for-TV event where competitors attempt to bowl as many strikes as possible in two minutes. Seeded #4 after rolling 10 strikes in the first round, Prather went on to defeat Anthony Simonsen in the championship (fourth) round, 7–6, to claim the win and the $25,000 top prize. On July 22, Prather was crowned the PBA's "King of the Lanes" in a three-day, non-title event. He won the fifth challenge match (of six) in the event over PWBA player Gazmine Mason, and dethroned reigning King Sean Rash in the next match. He then defended his crown against the sixth and final challenger, PBA Hall of Famer Pete Weber. Despite the 2020 season being shortened by COVID-19, Prather posted a new career high in earnings with $223,285.

On March 14, 2021, Prather won his fourth PBA Tour title (with partner Andrew Anderson) at the Roth-Holman PBA Doubles Championship.

Prather qualified as the No. 1 seed at the 2022 PBA Tournament of Champions, but fell short of winning for the second time in this event when he was defeated by No. 2 seed Dominic Barrett in the final match. Two weeks later, Prather won the 2022 PBA World Championship as the No. 1 seed, defeating Jason Sterner in an exciting final match that required a one-ball, sudden death roll-off after the two tied the regulation game, 237–237. Prather won the roll-off 10–6 to win his second major and third career $100,000 prize check.

Based on points earned over the 2022 and 2023 seasons, Prather qualified as the #6 seed for the 2023 PBA Tour Finals, held June 24–25 in Arlington, Washington. Prather climbed the stepladder in Group 2, eventually defeating top seed Jason Belmonte by way of a roll-off in the race-to-two points final match. He then went on to face Group 1 winner Kyle Troup for the title, but lost in a two-game sweep.

In April 2024, Prather and partner Andrew Anderson won their second Roth-Holman doubles championship, giving Prather his sixth PBA Tour title.

Prather surpassed $1 million in career PBA Tour earnings during the 2025 season.

In addition to his six national PBA Tour titles, Prather has earned two PBA Regional Tour titles. He has rolled 28 certified perfect 300 games, including five in PBA Tour competition, and has 11 certified 800 series.

Desite not starting his PBA career until 2015, Prather still ranked #25 on the PBA's 2025 "Best 25 PBA Players of the Last 25 Seasons" list. The ranking was based on a points system that took into account standard titles, major titles, top-five finishes and Player of the Year awards.

=== PBA Tour titles ===
Major championships are in bold type.

1. 2019 PBA Scorpion Championship (Allen Park, Michigan)
2. 2019 PBA Tour Playoffs (Portland, Maine)
3. **2020 PBA Tournament of Champions** (Fairlawn, Ohio)
4. 2021 Roth/Holman PBA Doubles Championship w/Andrew Anderson (Tampa, Florida)
5. **2022 PBA World Championship** (Wauwatosa, Wisconsin)
6. 2024 Roth/Holman PBA Doubles Championship w/Andrew Anderson (Allen Park, Michigan)

=== Non-title PBA wins ===
1. 2019 PBA League (Portland Lumberjacks)
2. 2020 PBA League (Portland Lumberjacks)
3. 2020 PBA Strike Derby
4. 2020 PBA King of the Lanes
5. 2022 PBA League (Portland Lumberjacks)

== Career statistics ==
Statistics are through the last full PBA Tour season.

Season	Events	Cashes	Match Play	CRA+	PBA Tour Titles (majors)	Average	Earnings ($)
2015	15	5	2	0	0	214.55	12,040
2016	19	11	6	1	0	216.63	26,490
2017	18	10	7	0	0	219.34	27,935
2018	20	13	9	5	0	220.33	60,885
2019	26	17	12	5	2	216.50	179,348
2020	13	11	8	2	1 (1)	--	223,285
2021	18	14	11	2	1	217.23	91,505
2022	14	11	11	2	1 (1)	220.92	222,750
2023	18	9	4	1	0	215.22	66,650
2024	15	10	2	2	1	221.38	64,125
2025	17	8	6	1	0	220.66	57,000
Totals	193	119	78	21	6 (2)	--	1,032,013

+CRA = Championship Round Appearances
