= PBA Tour Playoffs =

The PBA Tour Playoffs is an annual invitational event on the PBA Tour in North America that debuted in the 2019 season. After two years as a 24-player tournament, the event was set up in a 16-player bracket-style format four three seasons, then as a 12-player format in 2025.

== Tournament structure ==
PBA Tour Playoffs participants are chosen and seeded based on points earned in qualifying to-date tournaments of the current season. (For 2019, this included 13 events, from the PBA Hall of Fame Classic through the USBC Masters; for 2020, this included 12 events due to the cancellation of the USBC Masters.) PBA Tour points are awarded on a tier system, as follows:

- Tier 3: PBA short format or limited field tournaments (2500 points for first, and descending thereafter)
- Tier 2: PBA standard tournaments with a fully open field (double the points of Tier 3 events)
- Tier 1: PBA major tournaments (triple the points of Tier 3 events)

For 2019 and 2020, the top eight players in points received byes into the second round (round of 16). The #9 through #24 seeds competed in single-elimination matches (one standard ten-frame game each) to determine who advanced to the second round.

For 2019, Round 2 and all subsequent rounds featured double-elimination matches, also known as the "race to two points". Any player winning both games in a match earns two points and advances to the next round. If the match is split one game each, the players bowl a 9th/10th frame roll-off to determine who wins the second point and the right to advance. If the 9th/10th frame roll-off results in a tie, a one-ball, sudden death roll-off is used until a winner is determined. For 2020, only the championship finals used the race to two points format. All other rounds were single-elimination matches.

The PBA Players Committee originally voted to make the playoffs a non-title event, citing the low number of games bowled as the primary reason. However, on December 6, 2019, the PBA announced that the winner of the 2019 PBA Playoffs would retroactively be awarded a PBA Tour title, and that the winner of the 2020 PBA Playoffs and subsequent events will be credited with a PBA title. As of 2020, winners also receive a WWE championship belt, as part of a cross-promotion with WWE wrestling, which is also broadcast on Fox Sports (TV home of the PBA from 2019 to 2025).

Since 2021, the PBA Playoffs feature a 16-player field rather than a 24-player field. All PBA Playoffs matches are double-elimination ("race to two points") except for the final match, which uses a "race to three points" format. Players bowl a maximum of four games, with the first player to win three games earning the championship. If the match is split two games each, the players bowl a 9th/10th frame roll-off for the third point and the title.

In 2024, the PBA Playoffs had a 16-player starting field, with the 12 through 16 seeds competing in a separate stepladder event to qualify for the #12 seed. The 5 through 11 seeds were then joined by the #12 seed in a bracketed round of eight. The top four seeds automatically gained entry into the quarterfinal round of eight, facing the four survivors of the 5 through 12 brackets. Elimination brackets then continued until a champion was crowned.

In 2025, only the top 12 players in points made the initial field. Bracketed head-to-head matches for the 5 through 12 seeds determined the four players who would meet the top four seeds in the quarterfinal round.

There was no PBA Playoffs event in the 2026 PBA Tour season. It will return in 2027 in a reimagined format, featuring the top 33 players in a win-and-advance bracketed format.

== Tournament history ==
=== Past winners ===
Season	Starting Field	Finals Airdate	Finals Location	Finals Format	(Seed) Winner	Finals Score	(Seed) Runner-up
2019	24	June 2, 2019	Portland, ME	Race to 2 pts.	(9) Kris Prather	2–0	(7) Bill O'Neill
2020	24	November 8, 2020	Centreville, VA	Race to 2 pts.	(2) Bill O'Neill	2–0	(4) Anthony Simonsen
2021	16	May 16, 2021	Milford, CT	Race to 3 pts.	(1) Kyle Troup	3–1	(11) Sam Cooley
2022	16	May 15, 2022	Jupiter, FL	Race to 3 pts.	(9) Kyle Troup	3–1	(6) Tommy Jones
2023	not held						
2024	16	May 19, 2024	Kissimmee, FL	Race to 2 pts.	(9) David Krol	2–1*	(10) Jesper Svensson
2025	12	May 24, 2025	Allen Park, MI	Race to 3 pts.	(7) Jesper Svensson	3–1	(1) E. J. Tackett

- *Second point earned in a 9th/10th frame roll-off.

=== 2025 event ===
The 2025 PBA Playoffs took place April 28–30 and May 24 in Allen Park, Michigan. All rounds except the final were recorded for TV broadcasts over the first three weekends of May. The final round was live on May 24. This season's event started with the top 12 players in points through the first 14 events of the season. The top four in points were automatically placed into the quarterfinals, with the 5 through 12 seeds competing in a play-in round for the other four quarterfinal spots. All matches this season were a "race to two points" format, except for the finals, which was a "race to three points." All matches featured a dual oil pattern (left lane=Bat 37, right lane=Billy Hardwick 44). Total prize fund of $300,000 included a $100,000 winner's share.

==== Play-in round ====
Held April 28, broadcast May 3 & 4. Winners (bold text) join the top four seeds in the quarterfinals. Losers earn $7,500.

Match 1: #9 Anthony Simonsen defeated #8 Ethan Fiore, 2–0 (258–200, 230–158)
Match 2: #12 Kyle Troup defeated #5 Tim Foy Jr., 2–0 (224–212, 265–215)
Match 3: #7 Jesper Svensson defeated #10 Jakob Butturff, 2–1 (192–200, 199–197, 60–39)
Match 4: #6 Chris Via defeated #11 Ryan Barnes, 2–1 (188–279, 234–185, 59–40)

==== Quarterfinals ====
Held April 29, broadcast May 10 & 11. Top four seeds automatically placed into this round. Winners (bold text) advance to semifinals. Losers earn $15,000.

Match 1: #1 E. J. Tackett defeated #9 Anthony Simonsen, 2–1 (211–236, 258–201, 48–38)
Match 2: #4 Graham Fach defeated #12 Kyle Troup, 2–1 (210–226, 206–205, 40–28)
Match 3: #7 Jesper Svensson defeated #2 Andrew Anderson, 2–1 (205–196, 192–213, 48–40)
Match 4: #6 Chris Via defeated #3 Jason Belmonte, 2–0 (217–199, 226–175)

==== Semifinals ====
Held April 30, broadcast May 18. Winners (bold text) advance to the finals. Losers earn $30,000.

Match 1: #1 E. J. Tackett defeated #4 Graham Fach, 2–0 (250–193, 210–190)
Match 2: #7 Jesper Svensson defeated #6 Chris Via, 2–0 (202–186, 248–172)

==== Finals ====
Held May 24. Two semifinal winners face each other in a "race to three points" final round.

Finalists: #1 E. J. Tackett vs. #7 Jesper Svensson

Match 1: Svensson defeated Tackett, 217–208
Match 2: Svensson defeated Tackett, 225–220
Match 3: Tackett defeated Svensson, 246–216
Match 4: Svensson defeated Tackett, 246–226

Jesper Svensson earns $100,000.
E. J. Tackett earns $50,000.
