= Sean Rash =

American ten-pin bowler (born 1982)

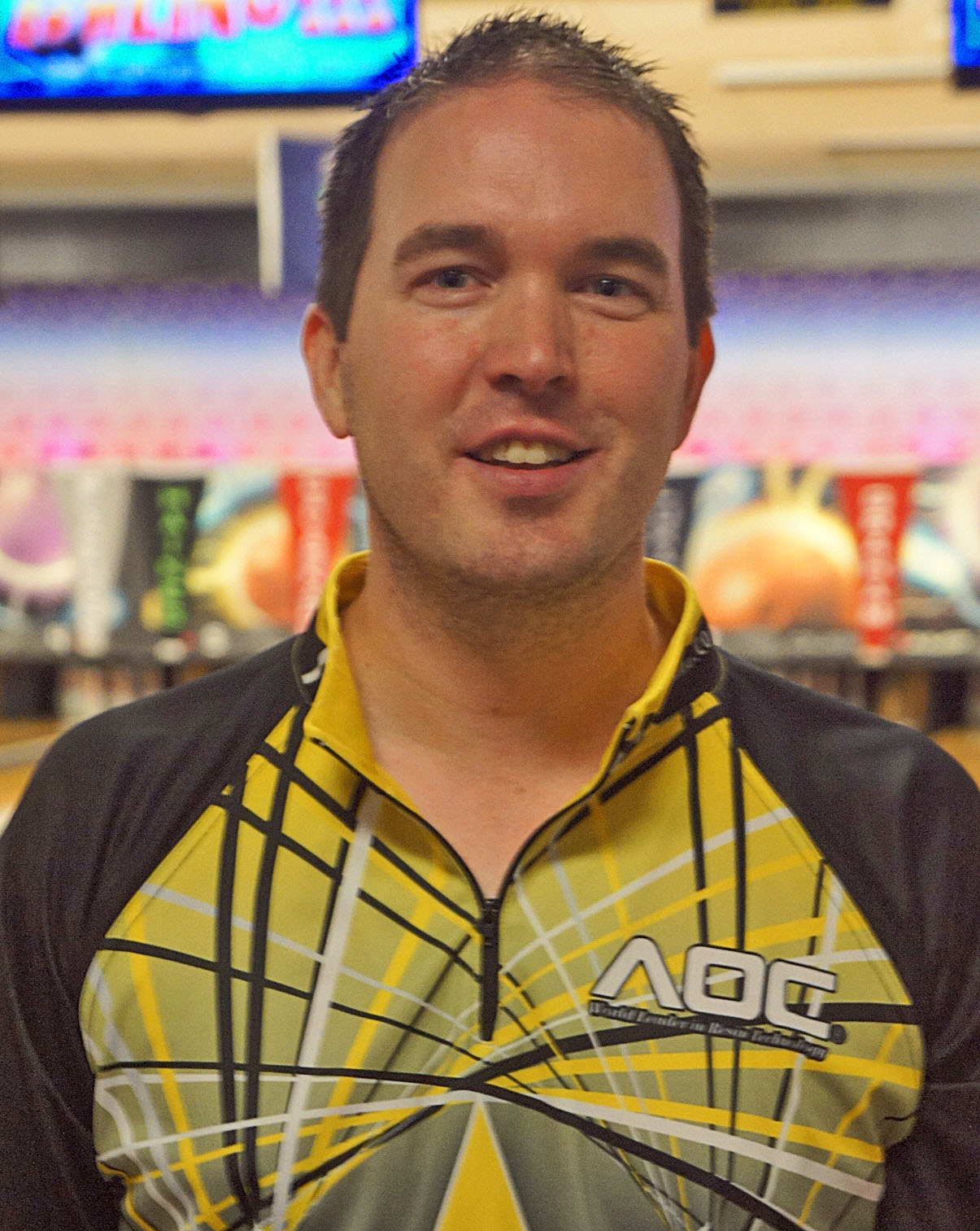
- Rash in 2017

Personal information
- Born: August 22, 1982 (age 44) Denver, Colorado, U.S.
- Years active: 1998-present (Turned pro in 2005)
- Height: 6 ft 1 in (185 cm)

Bowling Information
- Affiliation: PBA
- Rookie year: 2005
- Dominant hand: Right (cranker delivery)
- Wins: 18 PBA Tour titles (2 majors); 10 PBA Regional Tour titles 2011–12 PBA Player of the Year
- Sponsors: SWAG Bowling, JoPo Grips, Dexter shoes

Sean Rash (born August 22, 1982) is an American professional ten-pin bowler who has been one of the top players on the Professional Bowlers Association (PBA) Tour. He currently owns 18 PBA Tour titles, including two major championships, and was the 2011–12 PBA Player of the Year. Rash has rolled two of his 30 career PBA perfect 300 games on television, making him the first player in history with multiple perfect games in the TV finals of a PBA Tour event. Canadian François Lavoie, American Chris Via, and Australian Jason Belmonte have since joined Rash in this exclusive club. Rash has also been on the losing end of four televised 300 games, more than any other player. He owns ten PBA Regional Tour titles.

In January 2024, Rash was elected to the USBC Hall of Fame (Superior Performance category). He was officially inducted on April 24, 2024. On January 31, 2025, Rash was voted into the PBA Hall of Fame, and was notified via a surprise announcement from PBA Commissioner Tom Clark at a pro-am event for the PBA Owens Illinois Classic. He was officially inducted with the 2025 class at a ceremony during the PBA Tournament of Champions in April, 2025. In December 2025, Rash was voted into the Alaska Sports Hall of Fame as a 2026 inductee.

In January 2020, Rash became a member of the 900 Global pro staff, after being previously sponsored by Brunswick for 17 years. Rash was briefly sponsored by MOTIV Bowling in the summer of 2025, but signed with SWAG Bowling in 2026. In August 2026, SWAG and Rash announced the Virtue, Rash's first-ever signature bowling ball. He is also sponsored by JoPo Grips, Dexter shoes and BowlersMart.com.

== Before the PBA ==
Sean Rash was a highly accomplished bowler before turning pro. His amateur accomplishments included:

- Junior Team USA member in 1998, 2002, and 2003.
- Team USA member in 2002, 2004, and 2005. He was part of the 2004 team that won the World Tenpin Team Cup in The Netherlands.
- Two-time All-American at Wichita State University (2002 and 2003).
- Won the 2003 International Bowling Congress (IBC) National Championship, and was runner-up for IBC Bowler of the Year.
- Won the 2003 USBC Doubles Championship, where he and partner Derek Sapp established an all-time record for pinfall with 1,540 over six games (later broken in 2007 by Jonathan Masur and Jeffrey Butler shooting a 1,544).
- Bowled as an amateur in the 2003 USBC Masters, his first-ever PBA Tour event, and finished seventh.

Rash also started a tournament in his native Alaska when he was just 13 years old. Frustrated by a lack of scratch tournaments for junior bowlers, he started his own: Sean Rash Stars of the Future. The tournament was in its 18th year as of 2012, and has awarded nearly $25,000 in scholarship money over the years.

== PBA career ==
=== Early years ===
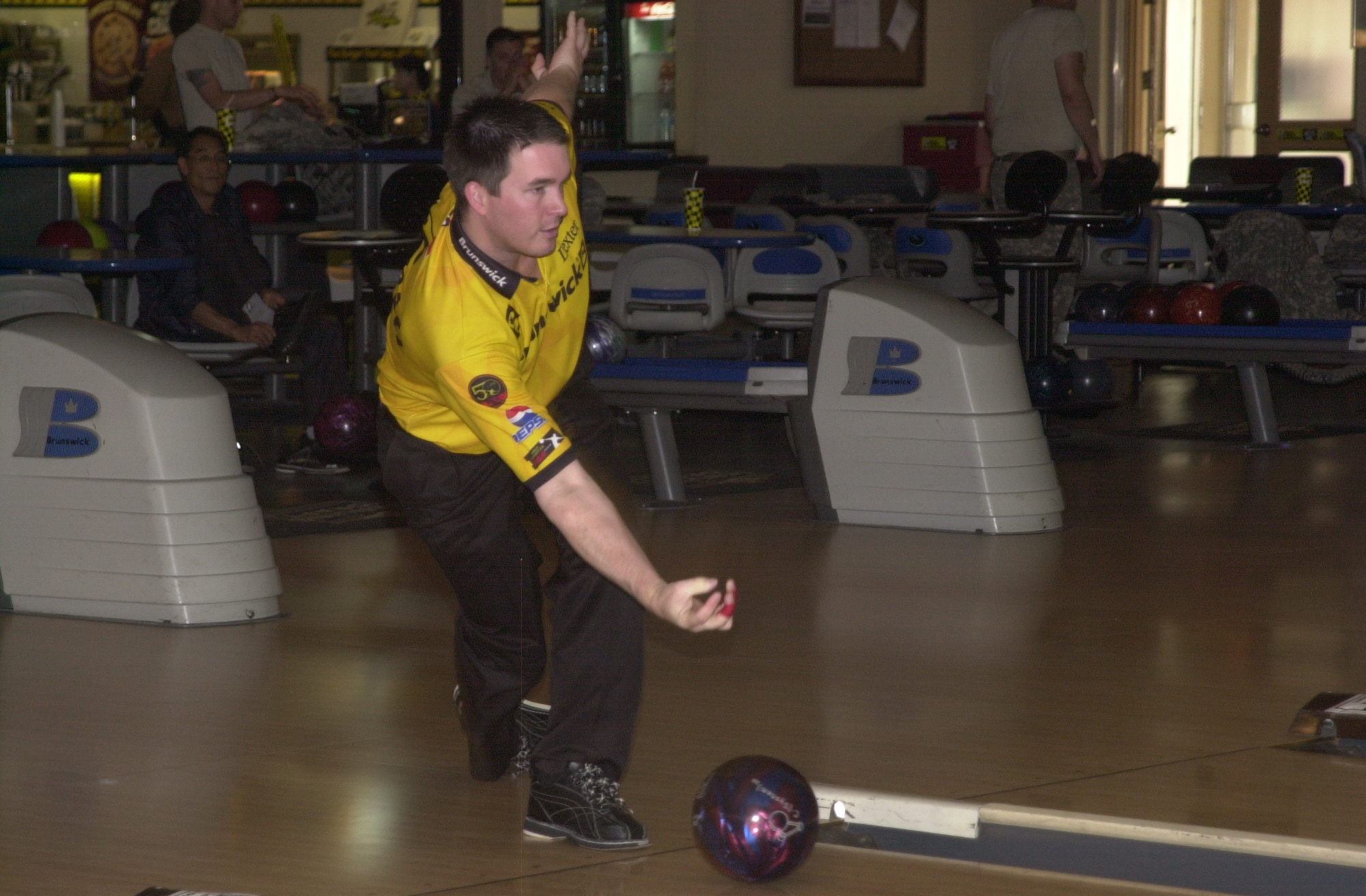
Sean Rash throws a ball in a 2009 game with US Army Area I Soldiers and civilians.

Rash joined the PBA Tour in 2005. He holds the distinction of being the first PBA player to ever win a title when starting from the Tour Qualifying Round (TQR), which he accomplished in his rookie season at the 2006 West Virginia Championship. Rash caused a minor controversy during his 256–236 semifinal victory over Danny Wiseman in the 2006 Beltway Classic in Baltimore. After throwing a match-clinching strike in the 11th frame, Rash approached the crowd at the left side of the approach and yelled, "Who's your hometown fan, now?" seemingly in reference to Wiseman, a Baltimore native. Rash later minimized his outburst, telling The Baltimore Sun in 2007, "The media and everybody took it and twisted it the wrong way. Danny knew exactly what I meant. I was trying to get his fans to cheer me on in the next match." Rash went on to win the next match and the title.

Rash won his first PBA major title at the 2007 USBC Masters in Milwaukee, Wisconsin. The win gave him four titles in his first four television appearances, and seven straight match wins on TV to open his career (one short of the record eight wins set by George Branham III). The streak ended when Rash lost to Norm Duke in the semifinal match of the 2008–09 season-opening PBA World Championship.

=== 2011–12: PBA Player of the Year ===
Rash won the 2012 PBA Tournament of Champions for his first championship in five years, and second major title overall. Qualifying as the #1 seed, Rash beat Ryan Ciminelli in the final match 239–205. Rash led the 2011–12 PBA Tour in average, earnings and points. On May 28, 2012, the PBA announced that Rash had won the 2012 Chris Schenkel PBA Player of the Year award in an extremely close vote (Rash received 29% of the vote to Jason Belmonte's 26.6%).

=== 2012–13: International success ===
Rash won his sixth and seventh PBA Tour titles in the 2012–13 season, in the WBT Kuwait Open and WBT Thailand Open. He later won an additional $20,000 in the World Bowling Tour finals (contested at the 2013 World Series of Bowling), but this did not count as a PBA title. He was the top money winner on Tour for the 2012–13 season, with earnings of $248,317.

=== 2014: First televised 300 game ===
In the finals of the PBA Wolf Open on May 24, 2014 (broadcast nationally on June 3, 2014), Sean rolled the PBA's 23rd televised 300 game in the opening match. He went on to win the tournament for his eighth PBA title.

=== 2015: Second televised 300 game ===
On February 15, 2015, Rash bowled a 300 game on ESPN while competing in the Barbasol Tournament of Champions in Indianapolis, Indiana, the 25th time a perfect game had been bowled in a televised PBA event. This, combined with his June 2014 perfect game, made him the first player in PBA history to have bowled two televised perfect games in PBA Tour events. He did not, however, go on to win the tournament. On October 11, 2015, Rash bowled from the #1 seed position and defeated Hall of Famer Pete Weber in a single-game final to win the PBA Xtra Frame Iowa Midwest Open for his ninth PBA title.

Sean passed the $1 million mark in career PBA earnings during the 2015 season.

=== 2016: 10-title plateau ===
Rash won his 10th PBA title at the PBA Fall Swing Badger Open on September 10, 2016 in Allen Park, Michigan, defeating #1 qualifier Wes Malott in the final match. One day later, Rash won his 11th title in the PBA Detroit Open, defeating top seed Jason Belmonte in the final match.

=== 2017 ===
As one of the top eight money leaders from the start of the 2015 season through the 2017 USBC Masters, Rash was invited to participate in the inaugural Main Event PBA Tour Finals in May 2017. He placed sixth in the event. On August 20, 2017, Rash won his 12th PBA Tour title at the Xtra Frame Gene Carter's Pro Shop Classic in Middletown, Delaware, defeating reigning PBA Player of the Year E. J. Tackett in the final match.

=== 2018 ===
Rash endured his most difficult season to date in 2018, advancing to match play in only 10 of 30 events and making only one championship round appearance.

=== 2019 ===
On January 13, 2019, Rash won his 13th PBA title, teaming with partner Matt Ogle to take the top prize in the Roth-Holman PBA Doubles Championship. Rash qualified as the #6 seed for the inaugural PBA Tour Playoffs. He made it to the Final Four on June 1, but lost in the semifinal to Bill O'Neill. He won his second title of 2019 and 14th overall on August 27 at the PBA Wolf Open. Qualifying as the #3 seed, Rash defeated Kyle Troup in his first match, then rolled back-to-back 257 games against #2 qualifier Norm Duke and top seed Anthony Simonsen to earn the championship. Rash was also recognized as the USBC Cup champion for earning the most points during the nine-event 2019 PBA Summer Swing, which awarded him a $20,000 bonus. He qualified as the #1 seed at the 2019 U.S. Open, but finished runner-up to champion François Lavoie. Rash also won the non-title 2019 PBA China Tiger Cup on November 21, sweeping A.J. Johnson 211–194 and 227–207 in the best-two-of-three final to take the $20,000 top prize.

=== 2020 ===
On January 26, 2020, Rash won his 15th PBA Tour title at the PBA Oklahoma Open. He qualified as the #5 seed for the stepladder finals and won all four matches to win the title, defeating Packy Hanrahan, Jesper Svensson, Brad Miller, and top seed Ryan Ciminelli. On June 13, 2020, Rash won the PBA Summer Clash, a non-title made-for-TV event held in Jupiter, Florida. Rash outlasted nine other competitors in the one-ball elimination tournament, surviving two sudden-death tie-breakers on his way to defeating Bill O'Neill in the ninth and final round. On October 4, 2020, Rash won the PBA World Series of Bowling XI Cheetah Championship held in Centreville, Virginia. (Qualifying rounds were held in Las Vegas in March, after which the event was postponed due to the COVID-19 pandemic.) As the #3 seed for the finals, he defeated Darren Tang, Packy Hanrahan, and top seed E. J. Tackett to claim his 16th PBA Tour title. This was Rash's first title in a World Series of Bowling event after 15 previous final round appearances, which included four runner-up finishes.

Rash surpassed the $1.5 million mark in career earnings during the 2020 season. He has accumulated 30 perfect 300 games in PBA events to date (end of 2019 season).

=== 2021 ===
On August 22, 2021 (his 39th birthday), Rash won his 17th PBA Tour title at the PBA Chesapeake Open, defeating Tom Daugherty in the final match.

=== 2022 ===
In the opening event of the 2022 season, the PBA Players Championship, Rash won the Midwest Region final over Matt Russo. During the final match, Rash openly questioned the "integrity" of urethane bowling ball use on the PBA Tour, due to his rather well-known disapproval of the way urethane bowling balls can change lane conditions – mostly the Purple Hammer, which has had controversy surrounding its softness. He also uttered an expletive on the live broadcast during his rant. He was fined an undisclosed amount, forced to miss one February event (later announced as the Dave Small's Best of the Best Championship), and was placed on one year probation by the PBA for "conduct unbecoming a professional". Rash went on to claim the No. 1 seed for the January 29 Players Championship finals, but fell to No. 2 seed Jason Belmonte in the final match.

=== 2023 ===
Early in the 2023 season, Rash announced he has been diagnosed with a degenerative disc disease, but still wants to continue bowling as much as treatment options will allow.

=== 2024 ===
Rash suffered through an injury-plagued PBA season in 2024, cashing only six times in 15 events and ranking 42nd in points. He was a member of the Las Vegas High Rollers PBA Elite League team, which won the 2024 Elias Cup championship. In the semifinal round, Rash rolled a strike on all eight of his shots as the High Rollers advanced against the Motown Muscle.

=== 2025 ===
On January 31, 2025, Rash was voted into the PBA Hall of Fame (Performance category). He was officially inducted in April, 2025. Despite battling a hand injury that occurred during the latter stages of match play, Rash won the Storm Lucky Larsen Masters in Helsingborg, Sweden for his 18th PBA Tour title and first since 2021. After knocking off American Nate Purches in the semifinals, he defeated Finland's Juho Rissanen in the final match, 221–191. The 18th win moved Rash into the top 20 on the PBA's all-time titles list (tied with four others in 19th place).

Rash ranked #7 on the PBA's 2025 "Best 25 PBA Players of the Last 25 Seasons" list. The ranking was based on a points system that took into account standard titles, major titles, top-five finishes and Player of the Year awards.

=== PBA Titles ===
Major titles in boldface.

1. 2005–06 West Virginia Open (Parkersburg, WV)
2. 2006–07 Beltway Classic (Baltimore, MD)
3. 2006–07 Earl Anthony Medford Classic (Medford, OR)
4. **2007–08 USBC Masters** (Milwaukee, WI)
5. **2011–12 PBA Tournament of Champions** (Las Vegas, NV)
6. 2012–13 WBT Kuwait Open (Kuwait City)
7. 2012–13 WBT Thailand Open (Bangkok)
8. 2014 PBA Wolf Open (Shawnee, OK)
9. 2015 PBA Xtra Frame Iowa Midwest Open (Council Bluffs, IA)
10. 2016 PBA Badger Open (Allen Park, MI)
11. 2016 PBA Detroit Open (Allen Park, MI)
12. 2017 Storm Xtra Frame Gene Carter's Pro Shop Classic (Middletown, DE)
13. 2019 Roth-Holman PBA Doubles Championship w/Matt Ogle (Shawnee, OK)
14. 2019 FloBowling PBA Wolf Open (Aurora, IL)
15. 2020 PBA Oklahoma Open (Shawnee, OK)
16. 2020 PBA WSOB XI Cheetah Championship (Las Vegas, NV and Centreville, VA)
17. 2021 PBA Chesapeake Open (Chesapeake, VA)
18. 2025 Storm Lucky Larsen Masters (Helsingborg, Sweden)

== Career statistics ==
Statistics are through the last complete PBA season.

Season	Events	Cashes	Match Play	CRA+	PBA Titles (majors)	Average	Earnings ($)
2005–06	19	12	4	1	1	214.25	55,655
2006–07	20	20	12	2	2	221.29	91,500
2007–08	21	20	13	1	1 (1)	217.96	151,500
2008–09	21	21	14	3	0	218.10	67,090
2009–10	19	16	10	3	0	217.60	54,110
2010–11	12	10	7	2	0	217.81	64,930
2011–12	13	12	10	7	1 (1)	228.13	140,250
2012–13	30	22	11	7	2	227.36	248,317
2014	20	17	6	3	1	221.40	94,884
2015	26	19	11	3	1	225.16	101,690
2016	27	18	11	3	2	219.36	74,555
2017	25	19	6	2	1	222.91	75,937
2018	30	19	10	1	0	215.26	46,722
2019	31	23	13	7	2	218.41	148,968
2020	13	5	4	3	2	--	133,650
2021	19	14	4	2	1	218.63	63,840
2022	12	10	8	3	0	219.63	114,140
2023	15	5	4	2	0	211.97	32,200
2024	16	7	4	1	0	214.91	38,107
2025	16	7	5	3	1	218.23	52,232
2026	15	8	4	0	0	215.21	24,225
Totals	420	304	171	59	18 (2)	---	1,874,502

+ CRA=Championship Round Appearances

== Personal ==
Rash was born in Denver, Colorado. At the age of six months, he and his family moved to Anchorage, Alaska, where he lived until he was 18 years old. He then attended Wichita State University in Wichita, Kansas. He now resides in Montgomery, Illinois, with his wife Sara and their three daughters.

== Sources ==
- www.pba.com, official site of the Professional Bowlers Association and Lumber Liquidators PBA Tour
- http://www.bowl.com/tournaments/usbcopen/national/records_general_records.aspx

Awards and achievements
Preceded by (Australia) Jason Belmonte	Best Bowler ESPY Award; 2012	Succeeded by (United States) Pete Weber
Preceded by (Finland) Mika Koivuniemi	PBA Player of the Year; 2011-12	Succeeded by (Australia) Jason Belmonte
