= François Lavoie =

Canadian ten-pin bowler (born 1993)

- Lavoie at an informal event in 2024

Personal information
- Born: February 27, 1993 (age 33)

Bowling Information
- Affiliation: PBA
- Rookie year: 2016
- Dominant hand: Right (tweener delivery)
- Wins: 6 PBA Tour (3 majors); 13 PBA Regional Tour
- 300-games: Multiple
- Sponsors: Storm Products, Turbo Inserts
Medal record
Representing Canada
Pan American Games
Gold medal – first place	2015 Toronto	Men's doubles
Silver medal – second place	2023 Santiago	Men's doubles

François Lavoie (born February 27, 1993) is a right-handed Canadian ten-pin bowler from Quebec City, Quebec, Canada, now making his home in Wichita, Kansas. He is a member of the Professional Bowlers Association, and has been a member of Team Canada. Lavoie has won six PBA Tour titles, including three major championships. He is one of only four players in history to roll a perfect 300 game in two televised PBA Tour title events, and the only player to bowl a 300 game in a U.S. Open telecast.

Lavoie is a member of the Storm and Turbo Grips pro staffs.

== Amateur career ==
Lavoie won the 2013 World Bowling Championships trios gold medal (partners: Mark Buffa and Patrick Girard).

In 2014, Lavoie won the Intercollegiate Singles Championship as a member of the Wichita State University bowling team.

In 2015, Lavoie won the Intercollegiate Team Championship with Wichita State University, and the Pan Am Games doubles gold medal (with partner Dan MacLelland) in Toronto. During the men's doubles event Lavoie scored a perfect game in the fifth round, the first in Pan American Games history.

Lavoie was a four-time member of Youth Team Canada, and has been a four-time member of adult Team Canada. With Team Canada, he has won eight international medals (4 gold, 1 silver, 3 bronze).

In 2019, Lavoie was named to Canada's 2019 Pan American Games team.

== Professional bowling career ==
Lavoie joined the Professional Bowlers Association (PBA) in 2015. In his first full PBA Tour season (2016), Lavoie won two titles, including his first major championship at the U.S. Open. He was named the 2016 Harry Golden Rookie of the Year. He is the second Canadian to win a PBA Tour title (following Graham Fach), and the first to win a standard (non-major) title. In 2017, Lavoie won his third PBA Tour title at the Xtra Frame Greater Jonesboro Open. He then went without a title for all of 2018.

On October 30, 2019, Lavoie won his fourth title and second major, again in the U.S. Open. This made him the seventh player in the modern era (since 1970) to win this tournament multiple times.

On February 28, 2021, Lavoie won his fifth PBA Tour title and third major at the Kia PBA Tournament of Champions. Lavoie climbed from the No. 5 seed in the stepladder final, beating a PBA major champion in all four of his matches to take the title and $100,000 top prize. On April 18, 2021, Lavoie won the Guaranteed Rate PBA Super Slam, a special non-title event featuring the five winners of the 2021 major championships. He defeated PBA Players Championship winner Kyle Troup in the final match to earn his second $100,000 first place check of the season. Lavoie qualified as the #4 seed at the 2021 PBA Tour Playoffs and made it to the semifinal round before being eliminated by top seed Kyle Troup. Lavoie finished runner-up to Troup in the 2021 Chris Schenkel PBA Player of the Year voting.

Through the 2025 season, Lavoie's PBA earnings total over US$890,000, with $375,145 of that coming in the 2021 season alone.

He has rolled multiple 300 games in PBA competition. Among these perfect games, Lavoie recorded the PBA's 26th televised 300 game in the semifinal match of the 2016 U.S. Open against Shawn Maldonado, who scored 211. This was just the sixth televised perfect game in a major tournament, and the first ever in the U.S. Open finals. Lavoie also recorded the PBA’s 29th televised 300 game in the Round of 16 at the 2020 PBA Tour Playoffs, becoming the second bowler in PBA history to roll two televised 300 games in an official PBA Tour event (the first being Sean Rash, whom Lavoie coincidentally defeated in this PBA Playoffs match). Chris Via and Jason Belmonte have since become members of this exclusive club.

On August 3, 2024, Lavoie earned his sixth PBA Tour title at the PBA/PBA50/PWBA Jonesboro Trios, with partners Tom Hess and Breanna Clemmer. This was the first-ever mixed trios event to award titles to PBA, PBA50 and PWBA players.

Lavoie currently holds the PBA record for a six-game qualifying block. On April 1, 2026 at the PBA Ohio Classic, he rolled games of 290, 226, 300, 299, 299 and 277 for a 1,691 total (281.83 average). This shattered the previous record of 1635, which stood untouched for over 3 decades, and was set by Norm Duke in 1994, when Lavoie was just 11 months old, and matched by Dave Wodka in 1998.

=== PBA Tour wins ===
Major titles in bold type.

1. **2016 U.S. Open** (Las Vegas, Nevada) (Followed Mika Koivuniemi as the second international player to win the U.S. Open.)
2. 2016 Shark Championship (Reno, Nevada)
3. 2017 Xtra Frame Greater Jonesboro Open (Jonesboro, Arkansas)
4. **2019 U.S. Open** (Mooresville, North Carolina)
5. **2021 PBA Tournament of Champions** (Jupiter, Florida)
6. 2024 PBA/PBA50/PWBA Jonesboro Trios w/Tom Hess and Breanna Clemmer (Jonesboro, Arkansas)

=== Non-title wins ===
- 2021 PBA Super Slam Cup
- 2025 PBA Elite League Battle of the Brands Championship (member of champions Team Storm)

Lavoie also owns 13 PBA Regional titles, and he won the (non-title) PBA Regional Challenge at the 2017 PBA World Series of Bowling in Reno, NV. He was the 2016 Southwest Region Rookie of the Year and 2018 Southwest Region Player of the Year.

=== Career statistics ===
Season	Events	Cashes	Match Play	CRA+	PBA Tour Titles	Regional Titles	Average	Earnings (US$)
2016	17	11	8	5	2	2	222.79	86,645
2017	25	18	11	1	1	3	222.89	76,285
2018	27	17	9	1	0	2	214.54	52,983
2019	26	12	8	1	1	1	215.18	56,322
2020	15	11	10	1	0	0	220.76	86,250
2021	19	13	13	6	1	0	218.62	375,145
2022	13	3	3	0	0	0	212.02	30,100
2023	16	4	3	1	0	1	211.43	29,550
2024	16	8	1	1	1	2	216.37	43,641
2025	16	9	5	1	0	--	218.44	56,827

+CRA = Championship Round Appearances (PBA Tour only)

== Personal ==
Lavoie graduated from Wichita State University with a degree in business administration. He claims to have started bowling at age 2, and he also enjoys ice hockey and tennis.

In August 2022, Lavoie was elected Chairman of the International Bowling Federation (IBF) Athletes Committee.
