= Jakob Butturff =

American ten-pin bowler (1994–2026)

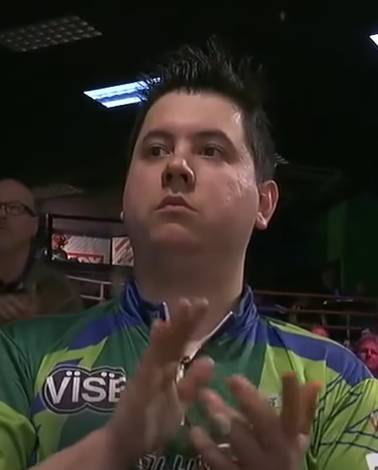
- Butturff in 2019

Personal information
- Born: April 28, 1994 Las Vegas, Nevada, U.S.
- Died: July 31, 2026 (aged 32) Candor, New York, U.S.
- Years active: 2015–2026
- Height: 173 cm (5 ft 8 in)

Bowling Information
- Affiliation: PBA
- Rookie year: 2015
- Dominant hand: Left
- Wins: 8 PBA Tour (1 major); 27 PBA Regional Tour
- 300-games: 19
- Sponsors: Hammer, Vise Grips

Medal record

Men's bowling

Representing United States

World Bowling Championships
Gold medal – first place	2017 Las Vegas	Team

World Bowling Championships
Silver medal – second place	2018 Hong Kong	Team

Pan American Games
Gold medal – first place	2019 Lima	Doubles
Bronze medal – third place	2019 Lima	Singles

IBF Super World Championships
Gold medal – first place	2021 Dubai	Trios

Jakob Aaron Butturff (April 28, 1994 – July 31, 2026) was an American left-handed ten-pin bowler from Tempe, Arizona and was a member of the Professional Bowlers Association. He competed in events on the PBA Tour and in global events as a member of Team USA. Butturff won eight national PBA Tour titles (including one major) and 27 PBA Regional Tour titles. He also rolled the 28th of the PBA Tour's 36 televised 300 games.

Butturff was sponsored by the Columbia 300 division of Ebonite (later a division of Brunswick) through 2025. In 2026, he signed with the Hammer Bowling division of Brunswick. He was also sponsored by Vise Grips.

== Amateur career ==
Butturff finished first at the 2017 Team USA Trials, and was a Team USA member from 2017 to 2019. He won a team gold medal at the 2017 World Bowling Championships.

Butturff and his Team USA teammates won the 2019 Weber Cup over Team Europe. At the 2019 Pan American Games in Peru, Butturff and Team USA teammate Nick Pate earned a gold medal in doubles. During qualifying for this event, Jakob broke the Pan American Games record for a six-game block with a score of 1,516. In the next six-game block, he broke his own record with a 1,538 score. He also earned a bronze medal in the singles event.

He was part of the rotating four-person team (with A. J. Johnson, Andrew Anderson and Kristopher Prather) that won the trios gold medal for Team USA at the 2021 International Bowling Federation (IBF) Super World Championships in Dubai.

== Professional bowling career ==
Butturff became a PBA member in 2015, bowling primarily on the PBA Regional circuit that season. In his seven national events during 2015, he cashed four times, made three match play rounds, and made one show at the 2015 PBA Viper Championship but lost to Kim Bolleby 222-181.

=== 2016 ===
Butturff won his first PBA Tour title in the 2016 PBA Xtra Frame Lubbock Sports Southwest Open. In October that same year, he won the PBA Xtra Frame Las Vegas Open for his second title.

=== 2017 ===
While he had no PBA Tour victories in the 2017 season, Butturff did win the title at the QubicaAMF World Cup on November 11 in Hermosillo, Mexico. Butturff had a chance to win his first major championship at the 2017 U.S. Open. He qualified as the #1 seed, leading his next-closest competitor by an astounding 617 pins, but he lost the televised championship match to Rhino Page, 256–222.

=== 2018 ===
Butturff won the Go Bowling! PBA 60th Anniversary classic in February 2018 for his third PBA Tour title, and first on national television. He then won the PBA Xtra Frame Kenn-Feld Group Classic in August for his fourth title. In October 2018, Butturff qualified as the #1 seed at the U.S. Open for a second straight season, but again lost the final match, this time by a single pin to England's Dominic Barrett on October 31. Butturff joined PBA Hall of Famer Earl Anthony as the only two bowlers to be the top qualifier in back-to-back U.S. Opens during the modern era (since 1971). Coincidentally, Anthony also lost the final match in both years (1979 and 1980).

=== 2019: first major title ===
Butturff qualified as the #1 seed for the first two tournaments of the 2019 PBA Tour season, joining Johnny Petraglia, Earl Anthony and Walter Ray Williams Jr. as the only players to be the top qualifier in three consecutive PBA Tour events (going back to the final event of the 2018 season). Butturff lost the title match in the season-opening PBA Hall of Fame classic, but won the PBA Oklahoma Open the following week for his fifth PBA Tour title. He captured his sixth PBA Tour title and first major at the 2019 USBC Masters, qualifying as the #1 seed for the stepladder finals and defeating Mykel Holliman in the championship match for the win. Butturff won his seventh PBA title and third of the 2019 season on June 30 at the Lubbock Sports Shootout. He also had runner-up finishes in 2019 at the PBA World Championship, DHC PBA Japan Invitational, and Barbasol PBA Tour Finals. On October 21, Jakob won the $50,000 winner-take-all top prize in the PBA Clash. This was a non-title made-for-TV event featuring the 2019 season's top eight money leaders, and was broadcast November 3 on Fox. Butturff cashed a career-high $204,380 during the season, and finished runner-up to Jason Belmonte in the 2019 PBA Player of the Year voting.

=== 2020 ===
In the COVID-shortened 2020 season, Butturff took a step back, making only one championship round appearance and winning no titles.

=== 2021 ===
In the 2021 PBA World Championship, Butturff charged from the #3 seed to the final match, but had to settle for his second runner-up finish in this major tournament, falling to top seed Tom Daugherty in the final match, 263–257. Butturff also finished runner-up to Chris Via, 214–213, in the 2021 U.S. Open. This was his third runner-up finish in the event, and the second time he lost the final match by a single pin. Despite not winning a tournament in 2021, Butturff rebounded in earnings after a disappointing 2020 season, collecting $120,225.

=== 2022 ===
2022 saw continued frustration for Butturff, as he made four final round appearances but could not win a title.

=== 2023 ===
After having multiple runner-up finishes from 2020 through 2022, Butturff finally broke through in the PBA Scorpion Championship on Apr 18, 2023. Qualifying as the #1 seed, he defeated E. J. Tackett 225–217 in the championship match. With this emotional win (the first following the death of his mother in November 2020), Butturff claimed his eighth career PBA Tour title. Butturff qualified for the May 20–21 PBA Super Slam, a special event intended to feature the five major championship winners in the 2023 season. He qualified as the top finisher without a 2023 major title when E. J. Tackett won his second major of the season at the PBA World Championship (where Butturff finished fourth).

Butturff finished the 2023 season ranked fourth in points, third in average (223.92) and fourth in earnings ($175,125).

=== 2025 ===
Butturff qualified as the #6 seed for the 2025 PBA Tournament of Champions and won five straight matches (two in the play-in round to capture the fifth finals seed, then three more in the finals) to face top seed Jesper Svensson in the championship match. However, he could not complete the quest for a title, falling to Svensson 221–197.

=== Additional info ===
Butturff rolled 19 career perfect 300 games in PBA competition, including the PBA's 28th televised 300 game, which he bowled on July 18, 2020 in the seeding round for the PBA Tour Playoffs broadcast on CBS Sports Network.

Despite being 5 years old at the turn of the century, Butturff ranked #18 on the PBA's 2025 "Best 25 PBA Players of the Last 25 Seasons" list. The ranking was based on a points system that took into account standard titles, major titles, top-five finishes and Player of the Year awards.

=== PBA Tour wins ===
Major championships are in bold type.

1. 2016: PBA Xtra Frame Lubbock Sports Southwest Open (Lubbock, TX)
2. 2016: PBA Xtra Frame Las Vegas Open (Las Vegas, NV)
3. 2018: Go Bowling! PBA 60th Anniversary Classic (Indianapolis, IN)
4. 2018: PBA Xtra Frame Kenn-Feld Group Classic (Coldwater, OH)
5. 2019: PBA Oklahoma Open (Shawnee, OK)
6. **2019: USBC Masters** (Las Vegas, NV)
7. 2019: PBA Lubbock Sports Shootout (Lubbock, TX)
8. 2023: PBA Scorpion Championship (Wauwatosa, Wisconsin)

=== Non-title wins ===
1. 2017 QubicaAMF World Cup
2. 2019 PBA Clash

=== Regional Tour success ===
In addition to his national PBA Tour titles, Butturff won 27 PBA Regional Tour titles, including a PBA-record nine Regional titles in the 2016 season alone. His 20th title came in just his 59th PBA Regional tournament on January 20, 2019. Of the 38 players to date with at least 20 Regional titles, Butturff was recognized as the youngest (aged 24) to reach the plateau.

== Bowling style ==
Butturff had a unique delivery, in part due to being double-jointed with "hypermobility" in his wrist. According to bowling coach and author Bill Spigner, Butturff's starting wrist position was "almost an impossible position for someone with normal flexibility to achieve." This allowed Jakob to impart high revolutions on his shot, achieving an RPM rate comparable to many two-handed bowlers. For this reason, Butturff frequently used an older-technology urethane bowling ball instead of reactive equipment.

== Death ==
Butturff died unexpectedly on July 31, 2026, at the age of 32.

== Career statistics ==
Statistics are through the last complete PBA Tour season.

Season	Events	Cashes	Match Play	CRA+	PBA Tour Titles	Regional Titles	Average	Earnings ($)
2015	9	6	5	4	0	2	222.46	18,400
2016	26	12	11	11	2	9	218.42	59,500
2017	33	19	17	7	0	4	224.41	73,825
2018	34	19	17	11	2	5	223.59	110,870
2019	31	21	18	9	3	2	219.63	204,380
2020	15	11	8	2	0	3	--	56,220
2021	24	19	17	4	0	1	220.57	120,225
2022	16	13	13	4	0	0	218.96	91,575
2023	19	16	11	7	1	1	223.92	175,125
2024	14	8	2	0	0	0	220.52	33,850
2025	17	12	7	2	0	--	221.65	115,455

+CRA = Championship Round Appearances
