= 2023 PBA Tour season =

- League: Professional Bowlers Association
- Sport: Ten-pin bowling
- Duration: January 29 – September 27

PBA Tour
- Season MVP: E. J. Tackett

PBA Tour seasons
- ← 2022 2024

The 2023 PBA Tour season, the 64th season of play for the U.S. Professional Bowlers Association's ten-pin bowling tour which consisted of 17 events, began on January 29 with the pre-tournament qualifier (PTQ) of the U.S. Open.

On August 17, 2023, the PBA and Fox announced they have agreed to a two-year media rights extension for tournament coverage on Fox and FS1 channels, as well as Fox digital channels, through the 2025 season. Initial commitment is for eight two-hour program windows on Fox and 22 two-hour windows on FS1. Bill Wanger, EVP-Head of Programming and Scheduling at Fox Sports, stated during the announcement that viewership for the 2023 season was up almost 15% from 2022.

== Season overview ==
On November 1, 2022, the PBA released the 2023 schedule, including Fox and FS1 broadcasts. For the first time in PBA history, the final rounds of all five major events were broadcast live on over-the-air network television (Fox network). The PBA also announced that match play or extended stepladder rounds for multiple tournaments would be broadcast on FS1, another PBA first. In addition, the 2023 season schedule includes nine standard singles title events and two doubles title events that will have final rounds broadcast on FS1 or live-streamed on BowlTV (the PBA's YouTube channel). The one exception is the PBA Tour Finals, which continues to be broadcast on CBS Sports Network.

Following the U.S. Open finals broadcast on February 5, other major finals broadcasts included the Tournament of Champions on March 19, the USBC Masters on April 2, the PBA World Championship on April 23 (part of the World Series of Bowling in Wauwatosa, Wisconsin that also includes three standard title events), and the PBA Players Championship on May 14. Fox also broadcast the PBA Super Slam finals on May 21, This special event featured all major tournament winners from the 2023 season. The five majors and the Super Slam each paid out a $100,000 top prize.

In February-March, there were five "Classic Series" tour stops each awarding a standard PBA singles title. The top eight points earners from these five events were invited to compete in a special, non-title Skill Ball Challenge event on July 22–23. In that event, all eight players were required to use an identical low-technology Skill 3.02 bowling ball.

The PBA League Elias Cup team competition, previously a summer event, was moved to the fall, with the finals broadcasts held on September 27 on FS1.

=== Season awards ===
Chris Schenkel PBA Player of the Year: E. J. Tackett (82.5% of first-place votes)

Harry Smith PBA Points Leader Award: E. J. Tackett (41,200)

George Young High Average Award: E. J. Tackett (227.18)

Harry Golden PBA Rookie of the Year: Cortez Schenck

Steve Nagy PBA Sportsmanship Award: BJ Moore

Tony Reyes PBA Community Service Award: Johnny Petraglia

== Tournament summary ==
The events currently scheduled for the 2023 PBA season are shown below. Major tournaments are in bold. Career PBA title numbers for winners are shown in parentheses (#). Winner's share prize money is shown in US dollars ($), except where indicated.

Tour points are awarded for most events. Besides the season-ending Harry Smith PBA Points Winner award, points are one consideration for Player of the Year voting and also affect eligibility and seeding for the PBA Tour Finals (with 2022 points).

- Tier 3: PBA short format or limited field tournaments (2500 points for first, and descending thereafter)
- Tier 2: PBA standard tournaments with a fully open field (double the points of Tier 3 events)
- Tier 1: PBA major tournaments (triple the points of Tier 3 events)

Event	Airdate	City	Preliminary rounds	Final round	Oil pattern	Winner	Notes
**U.S. Open presented by Go Bowling**	Feb 4 (match play) FS1; Feb 5 (finals) Fox; 1.007 million viewers	Indianapolis, IN	Jan 30–Feb 4 (PTQ: Jan 29)	Live	U.S. Open Custom (4 patterns, 37 to 45 feet)	(Indiana) E. J. Tackett, USA (17)	Open event (Tier 1). PBA major. $100,000 top prize.
PBA Springfield Classic	Feb 11 BowlTV	Springfield, MO	Feb 7–10 BowlTV (all rounds)	Live	Wolf 32	Sam Cooley, Australia (2)	Open event (Tier 2). $25,000 top prize.
PBA Shawnee Classic	Feb 17 BowlTV	Shawnee, OK	Feb 13–16 BowlTV (all rounds)	Live	Bear 41	(Indiana) E. J. Tackett, USA (18)	Open event (Tier 2). $25,000 top prize.
PBA Collegiate Championship	Feb 19 FS1	Indianapolis, IN	Feb 2 BowlTV (all rounds)	Feb 3	Rick Steelsmith 42	Women: Wichita State University; Men: Indiana Tech University	Special event featuring top six men's and top six women's college bowling teams (by USBC ranking), presented by the PBA. Top two teams from men's and women's qualifying appear in the televised finals.
PBA Wichita Classic	Feb 24 BowlTV	Wichita, KS	Feb 20–23 BowlTV (all rounds)	Live	Dragon 45	(Nevada) Anthony Simonsen, USA (11)	Open event (Tier 2). $25,000 top prize.
PBA Jackson Classic	Mar 9 BowlTV	Jackson, MI	Mar 6–8 BowlTV (all rounds)	Live	Chameleon 39 & Billy Hardwick 44	(Indiana) E.J Tackett, USA (19)	Open event (Tier 2). $25,000 top prize.
**PBA Tournament of Champions**	Mar 17 & 18 (match play) FS1; Mar 19 (finals) Fox	Fairlawn, OH	Mar 14–18 (PTQ: Mar 13)	Live	Don Johnson 40	Jason Belmonte, Australia (31)	Invitational event (Tier 1). PBA major. $100,000 top prize.
PBA Kokomo Classic	Mar 24 BowlTV	Kokomo, IN	Mar 21–23 BowlTV (all rounds)	Live	Viper 36 & Harry Smith 41	(Kansas) Packy Hanrahan, USA (1)	Open event (Tier 2). $25,000 top prize.
**USBC Masters**	Mar 31 (match play) FS1; Apr 2 (finals) Fox	Allen Park, MI	Mar 26–31	Live	USBC custom patterns Final round: USBC 46	(Nevada) Anthony Simonsen, USA (12)	Open event (Tier 1). PBA major. $100,000 top prize.
PBA WSOB XIV USA vs. The World	Apr 15 (singles) FS1; Apr 16 (doubles & team) FS1	Wauwatosa, WI	Apr 9–15	Live	Carmen Salvino 44	The World team (12–2): (Australia) Sam Cooley, (United Kingdom) Dom Barrett, (Sweden) Jesper Svensson, and (Australia) Jason Belmonte	Non-title event featuring 4 U.S. and 4 international players selected by captains Jason Belmonte and Tommy Jones. $40,000 to winning team.
PBA WSOB XIV Cheetah Championship	Apr 17 FS1	Wauwatosa, WI	Apr 9–10 (WSOB PTQ: Apr 7)	Live	Cheetah 35	(Indiana) E. J. Tackett, USA (20)	Open event (Tier 3-short format). $20,000 top prize.
PBA WSOB XIV Scorpion Championship	Apr 18 FS1	Wauwatosa, WI	Apr 11–12 (WSOB PTQ: Apr 7)	Live	Scorpion 42	(Arizona) Jakob Butturff, USA (8)	Open event (Tier 3-short format). $20,000 top prize.
PBA WSOB XIV Shark Championship	Apr 19 FS1	Wauwatosa, WI	Apr 13–14 (WSOB PTQ: Apr 7)	Live	Shark 48	(Kentucky) Matthew Ogle, USA (2)	Open event (Tier 3-short format). $20,000 top prize.
**PBA World Championship**	Apr 23 Fox	Wauwatosa, WI	Apr 9–14, 20	Live	Qualifying: Cheetah 35, Scorpion 42, Shark 48; Match play & finals: Earl Anthony 43	(Indiana) E. J. Tackett, USA (21)	Open event for WSOB entrants (PBA members only) (Tier 1). PBA major. Top 12 in 60-game qualifying pinfall from the three animal pattern events (20 games each) advance to World Championship round-robin match play. $100,000 top prize.
**PBA Players Championship presented by Snickers**	May 6, 7 (match play) FS1; May 13 (semi-finals) FS1; May 14 (finals) Fox	North Brunswick, NJ	Apr 30 (PTQ); May 1–4 (qualifying); May 6–7 (match play)	Live	Mike Aulby 39 (PTQ); Don Carter 39 & Dick Weber 45 (all other rounds)	(Indiana) Kevin McCune, USA (1)	PBA members-only event (Tier 1). PBA major. $100,000 top prize.
Roth/Holman PBA Doubles Championship	May 11 BowlTV	Middletown, DE	May 8–10 BowlTV (all rounds)	Live	Marshall Holman 38 & Mark Roth 42	(Kansas) Packy Hanrahan, USA (2); Mitch Hupé, Canada (1)	Open event (Tier 3-short format). $20,000 top prize (team).
PBA Super Slam Cup presented by Bowlero	May 20 (prelims) FS1; May 21 (finals) Fox	Jupiter, FL	May 20	Live	Del Ballard 34 & Johnny Petraglia 46	Jason Belmonte, Australia	Non-title event featuring all 2023 major champions. $100,000 top prize.
PBA Tour Finals	Jun 24 (seeding rounds) CBS Sports; Jun 25 (group stepladders & finals); CBS Sports	Arlington, WA	Jun 23–24	Live	Wayne Webb 38 & Earl Anthony 43	(North Carolina) Kyle Troup, USA (10)	Invitational title event. Starting field includes Top 8 players in Tour points since start of 2022 season. $30,000 top prize.
PBA Skill Ball Challenge	Jul 22–23 BowlTV	Allen Park, MI	Jul 22	Live	Skill 34 & Skill 46	(United Kingdom) Dominic Barrett, England	Non-title event. Top 8 players in points from the five 2023 Classic events use identical low-technology Skill 3.02 bowling balls. $16,000 top prize.
PBA-PWBA Striking Against Breast Cancer Mixed Doubles (a.k.a. The Luci)	Jul 30 Bowl TV	Houston, TX	Jul 27–29	Live	Custom 41-foot Kegel pattern	(Nevada) Anthony Simonsen, USA (13) & (New York (state)) Danielle McEwan, USA	Open PBA and PWBA title event. Tier 3-limited field. $25,000 Top prize.
PBA-WBT Storm Lucky Larsen Masters	N/A	Helsingborg, Sweden	Sep 1–9	Sep 10	Not reported	(Illinois) A. J. Johnson, USA (1)	PBA and WBT title event (Tier 3–limited field). Top prize 150,000 SEK (approx. $13,500 USD).
PBA League Elias Cup presented by Pabst Blue Ribbon	Quarterfinal play-in: Sep 24 FS1; Quarterfinals: Sep 25 FS1; Semifinals: Sep 26 FS1; Elias Cup Finals: Sep 27 FS1	Portland, ME	Seeding rounds: Sep 23 (not aired)	Live	Mark Roth 42	Snickers Waco Wonders (Parker Bohn III, Jason Sterner, BJ Moore, Frank Snodgrass, Ryan Ciminelli-MVP, Mgr-Johnny Petraglia)	Non-title team event. Ten-team starting field. Top prize: $100,000 to winning team.
PBA Strike Derby	Oct 22 Fox	Portland, ME	N/A	Sep 28	Mark Roth 42	(Ohio) Chris Via, USA	Non-title event. 8-player field selected based on number of strikes thrown during the 2023 season. $20,000 top prize.
