= 2024 PBA Tour season =

- League: Professional Bowlers Association
- Sport: Ten-pin bowling
- Duration: Jan. 9–Sept. 17 (18 tournaments)

PBA Tour
- Season MVP: E. J. Tackett

PBA Tour seasons
- ← 2023 2025

The 2024 PBA Tour season, the 65th season of play for the U.S. Professional Bowlers Association's ten-pin bowling tour which consisted of 18 events, began on January 9 with the pre-tournament qualifier (PTQ) of the PBA Players Championship. The season included 15 singles title events (eight standard, five major, two postseason), two doubles title events, a mixed trios title event, and a non-title team event.

On November 1, 2023, the PBA and Fox announced that the 2024 season will have over 60 hours of live coverage on Fox and FS1 networks. Multiple standard title events move to FS1 from previous streaming-only broadcasts, and Fox terrestrial stations will have eight broadcasts, the most since Fox acquired PBA broadcast rights in 2019.

== Season overview ==
As in 2023, the final rounds of all five major events were broadcast live on over-the-air network television (Fox network). This included the finals of the PBA Players Championship on January 15, the U.S. Open on February 4, the USBC Masters on March 31, the PBA World Championship on April 21 (part of the five-event PBA World Series of Bowling XV in Allen Park, Michigan), and the PBA Tournament of Champions on April 28. All five majors paid out a $100,000 top prize. Also scheduled for the Fox network was a PBA All-Star event with Fox NASCAR at the Shriners Children's 500 in Avondale, Arizona.

From February 5 to March 3, there were four “classic series” events which each awarded a standard title. The final round of these events were broadcast on FS1. The 2024 season also saw the return of the PBA Playoffs, which was last hosted in 2022.

The PBA League Elias Cup team competition returned with a revised format, and the new moniker "PBA Elite League". While the quarterfinals, semifinals and finals broadcasts on FS1 remain in September, as in 2023, there were season-long qualifying events at the first 14 PBA Tour stops. The league was reduced to eight teams of six players (from ten teams of five players previously), and head-to-head Baker matches throughout the season further reduced the field to six teams prior to the September 15 quarterfinals.

On July 31-August 2, the PBA hosted its first-ever mixed trios event in Jonesboro, Arkansas. The event featured trio teams pairing PBA, PBA50 and PWBA players.

=== Season awards ===
- Chris Schenkel PBA Player of the Year: E. J. Tackett (67.5% of votes)
- Harry Golden PBA Rookie of the Year: Nate Purches (70.16% of votes)
- Steve Nagy PBA Sportsmanship Award: Richie Teece (25.81% of votes)
- Tony Reyes PBA Community Service Award: Kyle Troup
- Harry Smith PBA Points Leader Award: E. J. Tackett (29,920 points)
- George Young PBA High Average Award: E. J. Tackett (229.37)

== Tournament summary ==
The events currently scheduled for the 2024 PBA season are shown below. Major tournaments are in bold. Career PBA title numbers for winners are shown in parentheses (#). Winner's share prize money is shown in US dollars ($), except where indicated.

Tour points are awarded for most events. Besides the season-ending Harry Smith PBA Points Winner award, points are one consideration for Player of the Year voting and also affect eligibility and seeding for the PBA Playoffs (2024 points only) and PBA Tour Finals (with 2023 points).

- Tier 3: PBA short format or limited field tournaments (2500 points for first, and descending thereafter)
- Tier 2: PBA standard tournaments with a fully open field (double the points of Tier 3 events)
- Tier 1: PBA major tournaments (triple the points of Tier 3 events)

Event	Airdate	City	Preliminary rounds	Final round	Oil pattern	Winner	Notes
**PBA Players Championship presented by Snickers**	Jan 15 Fox	Wichita, KS	Jan 10–13 (PTQ: Jan 9)	Live	Wayne Webb 38	Bill O'Neill, USA (14)	Members-only event* (Tier 1). PBA major. $100,000 top prize.
**U.S. Open presented by Go Bowling**	Feb 4 Fox	Indianapolis, IN	Jan 29–Feb 2 (PTQ: Jan 27)	Live	Four custom patterns	Kyle Troup, USA (11)	Open event (Tier 1). PBA major. $100,000 top prize.
PBA Illinois Classic	Feb 10 FS1	Mount Prospect, IL	Feb 6–8 (PTQ: Feb 5)	Live	Don Carter 39	Marshall Kent, USA (6)	Open event (Tier 2). $25,000 top prize.
PBA Pete Weber Missouri Classic	Feb 18 FS1	Springfield, MO	Feb 14–16 (PTQ: Feb 13)	Live	Dragon 45	Anthony Simonsen, USA (14)	Open event (Tier 2). $25,000 top prize.
Just Bare PBA Indiana Classic	Feb 24 FS1	Anderson, IN	Feb 20–22 (PTQ: Feb 19)	Live	Viper 37	Kyle Troup, USA (12)	Open event (Tier 2). $25,000 top prize.
PBA Delaware Classic	Mar 3 FS1	Middletown, DE	Feb 28–Mar 1 (PTQ: Feb 27)	Live	Billy Hardwick 44	David Krol, USA (1)	Open event (Tier 2). $25,000 top prize.
PBA All-Star Weekend	Mar 15–16 FS1; Mar 17 Fox	Avondale, AZ	N/A	Mar 6–8 (taped)	PBA LBC 43	Skills Competition: Team Storm (Kyle Troup, Sean Rash, Darren Tang); Legacy Cup: Team WRW (Walter Ray Williams Jr., Kyle Troup, Cortez Schenck); Battle of the Ages: PBA All-Stars def. PBA Legends; NASCAR Invitational: Lindsay Boomershine & A. J. Allmendinger	Non-title events featuring current PBA and PWBA stars, PBA legends, rookies and NASCAR drivers. Events: PBA All-Star Skills Showdown (Mar 6), PBA Legacy Cup (Mar 7), GoBowling! PBA NASCAR Invitational (Mar 8). Event held as part of NASCAR Shriners Children's 500 at Phoenix Raceway. To be broadcast before the NASCAR Bristol round the next week.
**USBC Masters**	Mar 31 Fox	Las Vegas, NV	Mar 25–29	Live	USBC Custom	DeeRonn Booker, USA (1)	Open event (Tier 1). PBA major. $100,000 top prize.
PBA WSOB XV Roth-Holman Doubles Championship	Apr 14 FS1	Allen Park, MI	Apr 4–5 (PTQ: Apr 2)	Apr 6 (taped)	Mark Roth 42 & Marshall Holman 38	Andrew Anderson, USA (4); Kris Prather, USA (6)	Open event (Tier 3-limited field). $30,000 top prize (team).
PBA WSOB XV Cheetah Championship	Apr 15 FS1	Allen Park, MI	Apr 8–9 (WSOB PTQ: Apr 6)	Live	Cheetah 36	Deo Benard, USA (1)	Open event (Tier 3-short format). $20,000 top prize.
PBA WSOB XV Scorpion Championship	Apr 16 FS1	Allen Park, MI	Apr 10–11 (WSOB PTQ: Apr 6)	Live	Scorpion 42	Matt Russo, USA (2)	Open event (Tier 3-short format). $20,000 top prize.
PBA WSOB XV Shark Championship	Apr 17 FS1	Allen Park, MI	Apr 12–13 (WSOB PTQ: Apr 6)	Live	Shark 48	E. J. Tackett, USA (22)	Open event (Tier 3-short format). $20,000 top prize.
**PBA World Championship**	Apr 20 (seeds 5 thru 9 play-in round) FS1; Apr 21 (finals) Fox	Allen Park, MI	Apr 8–13, 18 (WSOB PTQ: Apr 6)	Live	Qualifying: Cheetah 36, Scorpion 42, Shark 48; Match play & finals: Earl Anthony 43	E. J. Tackett, USA (23)	PBA members & qualifying collegiate players via PTQ (Tier 1). PBA major. 16 top qualifiers from animal pattern events advance to match play on April 18. Top four after match play automatically seeded for finals. April 20 stepladder (5-9 seeds) determines fifth seed for finals. $100,000 top prize.
**PBA Tournament of Champions**	Apr 28 Fox	Fairlawn, OH	Apr 23–25 (PTQ: Apr 22)	Live	Don Johnson 40	Marshall Kent, USA (7)	Invitational event (Tier 1). PBA major. $100,000 top prize.
PBA Playoffs	Play-in stepladder: May 4 FS1; Round of 12: May 5 FS1; Quarterfinals: May 12 FS1; Semifinals & Finals: May 19 Fox	Arlington, WA & Kissimmee, FL	May 4–5, 19	Live	Dick Weber 45 & Mike Aulby 39	David Krol, USA (2)	Starting field: top 16 in 2024 Tour points through April 28. $75,000 top prize.
PBA Tour Finals	Jun 7–seeding rounds CBS Sports; Jun 8–group stepladders and finals CBS Sports	Bethlehem, PA	Jun 7	Live	Marshall Holman 38 & Johnny Petraglia 46	Anthony Simonsen, USA (15)	Starting field: top eight points earners since start of 2023 season. $30,000 top prize.
PBA-PWBA Striking Against Breast Cancer Mixed Doubles (a.k.a. The Luci)	Jul 28 BowlTV	Houston, TX	Jul 26–28	Live	Custom Kegel pattern	Anthony Simonsen, USA (16) & Danielle McEwan, USA	PBA and PWBA title event. Top prize $25,000 (team).
PBA/PBA50/PWBA Jonesboro Trios	Aug 2 BowlTV	Jonesboro, AR	Jul 31–Aug 1	Live	Amleto Monacelli 40	François Lavoie, Canada (6); Tom Hess, USA; Breanna Clemmer, USA	PBA, PBA50, and PWBA title event. Open event (Tier 3-short format). Top prize $30,000 (team). Bowlers will bowl two five-game qualifying rounds within their respective tours, cutting to the top 16 players for match play. Qualifying pinfall will be dropped entering round-robin match play. Seeding entering match play will determine the PBA/PBA50/PWBA trios teams. All three top seeds will be paired together, as will the No. 2 seeds and so on. The top five teams will advance to a Stepladder Baker Format.
PBA-WBT Storm Lucky Larsen Masters	N/A	Helsingborg, Sweden	Aug 23–Aug 31	Sep 1	Not reported	Jesper Svensson, Sweden (12)	PBA and WBT title event (Tier 3–limited field). Top prize 160,000 SEK (approx. $15,660 USD).
PBA Elite League Elias Cup	Quarterfinal play-in (3–6 seeds): Sep 15 FS1; Semifinals 1 & 2: Sep 16 FS1; Elias Cup Finals: Sep 17 FS1	Portland, ME	Seeding based on Baker matches held concurrently with first 14 events of 2024 PBA season	Live	Mark Roth 42	Las Vegas High Rollers (Andrew Anderson-MVP, Sean Rash, Matt Russo, Matt Ogle, A. J. Johnson, Thomas Larsen, Mgr.-Amleto Monacelli)	Non-title team event. Eight-team starting field, reduced to six for Sep 15 play-in round. Top prize: $100,000 to winning team.
Go Bowling PBA Elite League Strike Derby	Oct 27 Fox	Portland, ME	N/A	Sep 17	Mark Roth 42	Jesper Svensson, Sweden	Non-title event. Eight-player field (six PBA Elite League players chosen via fan vote, plus two Commissioner's selections). $30,000 top prize.

- *Four non-member players from Wichita State University were granted Commissioner's exemptions for the 2024 PBA Players Championship.
