= Packy Hanrahan =

Left-handed American ten-pin bowler (born 1995)

Patrick Hanrahan
Personal information
- Nationality: American
- Born: April 25, 1995 (age 31) Greenwich, Connecticut, U.S.
- Years active: 2018–present
- Height: 191 cm (6 ft 3 in)

Bowling Information
- Affiliation: PBA
- Rookie year: 2019
- Dominant hand: Left (two-handed delivery)
- Wins: 3 PBA Tour; 4 PBA Regional Tour
- Sponsors: Brunswick, VISE Grips, Dexter

Patrick "Packy" Hanrahan (born April 25, 1995) is an American professional ten-pin bowler who joined the Professional Bowlers Association in 2018 after a collegiate career at Wichita State University. Born in Greenwich, Connecticut, he currently resides in Wichita, Kansas. He also competes internationally as a multi-year and current member of Team USA.

Hanrahan uses a two-handed shovel-style delivery with a dominant left hand. He has won three titles on the PBA Tour, two coming in the 2023 season and one in the 2026 season. He has also won four PBA Regional Tour titles.

Packy is a national pro staff member for Brunswick. He is also sponsored by VISE Grips and Dexter bowling shoes.

== Amateur career ==
Packy bowled for his high school team, the Greenwich High Cardinals, leading them to a Connecticut state championship in his senior year (2013). In the state championship, he rolled 23 consecutive strikes over his final two games, posting scores of 290 and 300.

Hanrahan then attended Wichita State University, trying out for the men's bowling team as a walk-on. He was placed on the developmental team in his freshman year, then made the varsity squad in his sophomore season. That season (2015) saw Wichita State win the collegiate national championship.

== Professional career ==
Hanrahan became a PBA member in 2018. He performed well enough in PBA Regional Tour events to qualify for the national PBA Tour in 2019. He did not fare well in the 2019 season, cashing only seven times in 22 events. He considered a career as a physical education teacher during the COVID-shortened 2020 season, but ultimately chose to return to the Tour in 2021.

The 2021 season saw modest improvement, as Hanrahan ranked 31st on Tour. 2022 was even better, as Packy cashed ten times in 13 events for a then-career high $81,185 and moved up to a No. 13 ranking in points. High finishes in 2022 included second place at the David Small's Best of the Best Championship and third at the PBA Scorpion Championship. He was also a member of the Portland Lumberjacks team, which won the PBA League championship in 2022.

Packy broke through with his first PBA title on March 24, 2023, winning the PBA Kokomo Classic. Qualifying as the top seed, Hanrahan won his lone finals match in convincing fashion, 268–214, over Matt Ogle. The $25,000 first prize was Packy's biggest single check to date. On May 11, Hanrahan won his second title of the 2023 season, capturing the Roth-Holman Doubles Championship with partner and fellow Wichita State alum, Mitch Hupé. The duo grabbed the lead in qualifying, with Hanrahan pacing the field at 3,082 pins over 12 games (a 256.8 average and just one pin shy of the PBA's 12-game qualifying round record, set by Mike Aulby in 1996). The pair maintained the top seed through 12 games of match play on their way to a wire-to-wire win, topping the team of Sean Rash and Matt Ogle in the finals. Through the first 15 events of the 2023 season, Hanrahan ranked sixth in Tour points. Based on his Tour points over two seasons, Packy qualified for his first PBA Tour Finals event in 2023 as the No. 7 seed. He would finish the June 24–25 tournament in a tie for fourth place. In 19 events of the 2023 season, Hanrahan finished sixth in points and cashed a new career-high $98,100.

During the 2026 PBA Tour season, Hanrahan qualified as the fifth seed for the Cheetah championship in the 17th PBA World Series of Bowling. On May 9, he captured his third career tour title, defeating Chase Nadeau and Zachary Tackett in the quarterfinals, defeating Kris Prather in the semifinals, and then sweeping Matt Sanders 2–0 in the race-to-two-points championship match. This victory also marks Hanrahan’s first televised PBA Tour title win.

=== PBA Tour titles ===
1. 2023 PBA Kokomo Classic (Kokomo, IN)
2. 2023 PBA Roth-Holman Doubles Championship w/Mitch Hupé (Middletown, DE)
3. 2026 PBA WSOB XVII Cheetah Championship (Lakeville, MN)

=== Other accomplishments and honors ===
- 2013 Connecticut state bowling champion as a member of the Greenwich High School team
- 2015 Collegiate Bowling National Championship as a member of the Wichita State Shockers
- Three-time member of Team USA
- 2020 and 2022 PBA League Elias Cup Champion with the Portland Lumberjacks team

== Personal life ==
Hanrahan did not take up bowling seriously until high school, stating, "Before high school, I bowled once a year like almost everyone else." He began practicing weekly with his father to improve his game. Packy's high school coach, Wayne Gioffre, stated, "He started out as an average bowler his first year, then really dove into the sport."

When not in bowling tournaments, Hanrahan has worked as a substitute teacher in the Wichita area.

Hanrahan married PWBA pro Madison Janack in 2025. Janack also bowled collegiately for Wichita State.
