= Kyle Troup =

American professional bowler (born 1991)

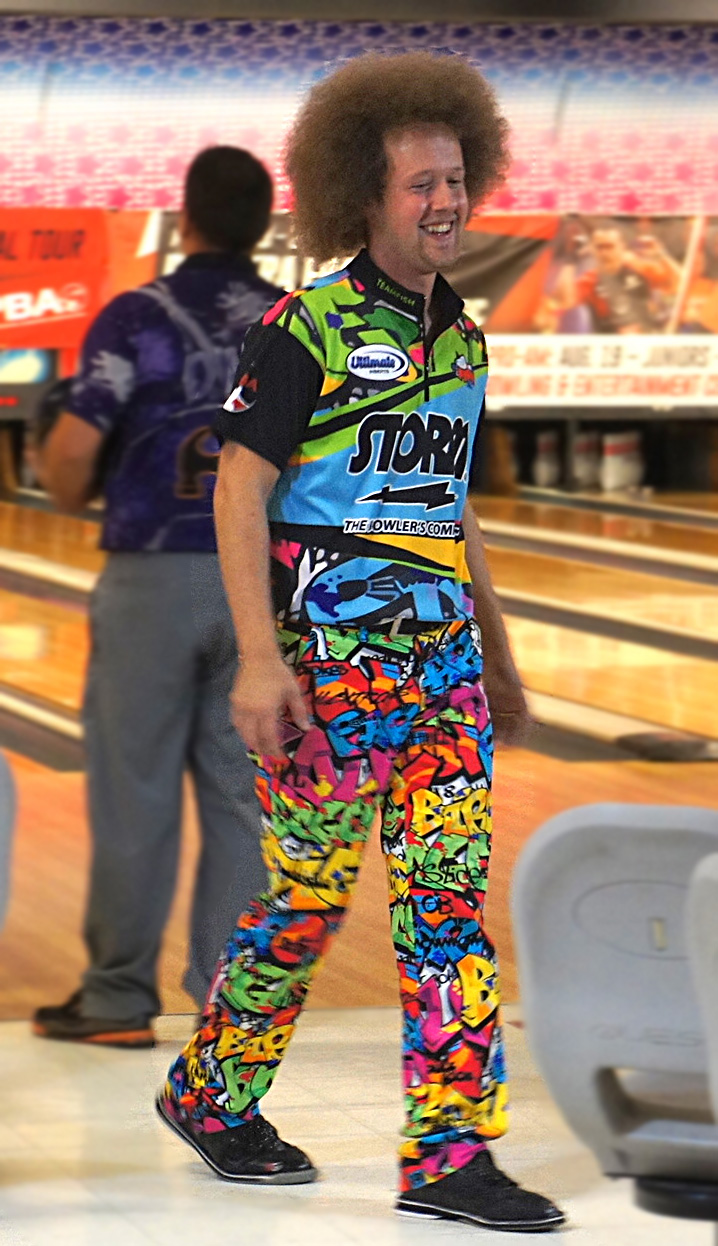
- Troup in 2016

Personal information
- Born: June 11, 1991 (age 35) Taylorsville, North Carolina, U.S.
- Years active: 2008–present
- Height: 183 cm (6 ft 0 in)

Bowling Information
- Affiliation: PBA
- Rookie year: 2008
- Dominant hand: Right (two-handed)
- Wins: 12 PBA Tour (2 majors); 15 PBA Regional Tour
- Sponsors: Storm Products, Vise grips

Kyle Troup (born June 11, 1991) is an American professional ten-pin bowler originally from Taylorsville, North Carolina. He uses the two-handed shovel-style delivery with a dominant right hand. Troup says he needed two hands when learning to throw the ball as a young child, calling himself self-taught in that regard. His father is PBA Hall of Famer Guppy Troup.

Troup has been a member of the Professional Bowlers Association (PBA) since 2008, and began competing full-time on the PBA Tour in 2015. He won his first national PBA Tour title at the 2015 PBA Wolf Open and has twelve PBA Tour titles to date, including two major championships and two wins in the PBA Playoffs. Since 2018, Troup also competes internationally as a member of Team USA.

With his $100,000 win at the PBA Playoffs on May 16, 2021, Troup set the PBA's single-season earnings record with $469,200, surpassing the $419,700 earned by Walter Ray Williams Jr. in the 2002–03 season. Troup would finish the 2021 season with $496,900 in earnings. At the PBA Tour Finals on June 5, 2022, Troup bowled the 33rd televised 300 game in PBA Tour history.

Troup is a member of the Storm and Vise Grips pro staffs.

== Amateur career ==
Troup, a Taylorsville, North Carolina native, was one of the youngest-ever members of the North Carolina All Stars team, bowling in events across North Carolina, South Carolina and Georgia as a teenager.

On January 7, 2018, Troup finished as the top qualifier at the United States Bowling Congress Team USA Trials, making the team for the first time in his career. At the 2018 World Bowling Tour Men's Championships in Hong Kong (held November 24–December 5), he won a gold medal in trios with teammates Andrew Anderson and E. J. Tackett.

Troup and his Team USA teammates won the 2019 Weber Cup over Team Europe. Troup bowled in ten matches over the 32-match event, going 5–0 in singles, 0–3 in doubles, and 1–1 in team. In the 2020 Weber Cup, Troup and Team USA again defeated Team Europe, 23–18. Overall in the 2020 event, Troup participated in 14 of 41 matches, going 3–3 in singles, 2–4 in doubles, and 1–1 in team. At the 2021 Weber Cup, the USA was defeated by Team Europe, 18–17. Troup participated in 10 of 35 matches, going 0–4 in singles, 2–0 in doubles, and 0–3 in team.

== PBA career ==
Said to be one of the PBA's premier two-handed bowlers, Troup sometimes uses an older-technology urethane bowling ball on shorter oil patterns. Troup has made 34 PBA championship round appearances through the 2025 season, and owns 15 PBA Regional titles. He has rolled 16 career 300 games in PBA competition through July 2020.

=== Early career ===
Troup spent his first five years as a PBA member bowling mostly in PBA Regional Tour events close to home, while he worked his regular job managing a Wendy's restaurant. He won his first Regional title at age 19 in the 2010 Fort Jackson (SC) Non-Champion Regional. He was named PBA Southern Region Player of the Year in both 2013 and 2014.

=== 2015 ===
In 2015, Troup decided to bowl more events on the national PBA Tour, and made it to the championship round (the final stage of a PBA tournament) four times. He won the 2015 PBA Wolf Open in Shawnee, Oklahoma for his first PBA Tour title. He finished eighth in the South Shore PBA/PBA50 doubles with PBA50 player Jerry Brunette Jr.

=== 2016 ===
In 2016, Troup finished second in the Downums Waste Services Xtra Frame Open, and fourth in the Gene Carter's Pro Shop Classic.

=== 2017 ===
Troup's second PBA Tour title came on April 16, 2017 in the Mark Roth-Marshall Holman PBA Doubles Championship, where he teamed with left-handed two-hander Jesper Svensson for the title. His only other TV finals appearance in 2017 was at the PBA World Championship major, where he finished fourth.

=== 2018 ===
On January 28, 2018, Troup made it to the final match of the DHC PBA Japan Invitational, but finished runner-up to top seed Dominic Barrett. Troup won his third PBA title on September 9, 2018 at the Storm Lucky Larsen Masters in Malmö, Sweden, defeating reigning PBA Player of the Year Jason Belmonte in the final match.

=== 2019 ===
Kyle was a member of the Portland Lumberjacks team, winners of the 2019 PBA League competition. He made a then-career high five championship round appearances in 2019, but did not win an individual title.

=== 2020 ===
Troup won his fourth PBA Tour title at the 2020 PBA Jonesboro Open on February 1. As the #1 seed for the stepladder finals, he defeated Chris Barnes in his sole championship match appearance, 290–269.

Troup won his fifth PBA Tour title at the 2020 Mark Roth-Marshall Holman PBA Doubles Championship on February 29. As the #1 seeds for the final round, Troup and partner Jesper Svensson defeated E. J. Tackett and Marshall Kent, 234–205. This was the second Roth-Holman doubles title for the Troup-Svensson duo, who also won this event in 2017.

On July 19, Troup claimed his sixth PBA Tour title at the 2020 PBA Tour Finals held in Jupiter, Florida. After topping Kris Prather in the semifinals, Troup defeated Anthony Simonsen in the championship round. In both rounds, Troup lost the first game of the double-elimination match, then rallied back to win the second game and the 9th/10th frame roll-off. Troup also rolled a 299 game in the televised seeding round of this competition, leaving a 2-pin standing on his twelfth and final shot after eleven strikes.

Despite the COVID-shortened 2020 season, Troup cashed a career-high $135,300.

=== 2021: first major, season earnings record and Player of the Year ===
Troup won the East Region finals for the 2021 PBA Players Championship, qualifying him for the championship stepladder. He then went on to capture the title and record-tying $250,000 top prize on February 21, winning from the #1 seed position over #3 seed Dick Allen. This was Troup's seventh PBA title and first major championship.

Based on points earned during the first nine events of the 2021 season, Troup earned the #1 seed for the PBA Tour Playoffs, which ran April 24 to May 16. He made it to the final round and defeated Sam Cooley, three games to one, to earn his second title of the season, eighth title overall, and the $100,000 winner's share. The earnings pushed Troup to $469,200 on the season, surpassing the previous PBA single-season earnings record of $419,700 set by Walter Ray Williams Jr. in 2002–03. Troup's total 2021 earnings were $496,900. Troup also set personal bests in 2021 with 13 match play rounds, nine top-ten finishes, and eight championship round appearances.

In a landslide vote, Troup won the Chris Schenkel PBA Player of the Year award for the 2021 season. While topping the Tour in earnings, Troup also collected 19,922.5 points to easily win the Harry Smith PBA Points Leader award.

=== 2022: PBA Playoffs repeat and Best Bowler ESPY ===
In early 2022, Troup was voted to receive the Dick Weber Bowling Ambassador Award, which has been given annually since 2006 by the Bowling Proprietors Association of America (BPAA) to "the bowling athlete who has consistently shown grace on and off the lanes by promoting the sport of bowling in a positive manner."

Despite not winning a title through the first thirteen events of the 2022 season, Troup accumulated enough points to earn the #9 seed for the PBA Playoffs. After defeating Sean Rash in the Round of 16, he defeated former Playoffs champions Bill O'Neill (quarterfinals) and Kris Prather (semifinals) to once again make it to the final round. In the "race to three points" finals, he defeated Tommy Jones, three games to one, to earn his first title of the season and ninth title overall, while also becoming the first player to win back-to-back Playoffs championships. The win also pushed Troup over the $1,000,000 mark in career PBA earnings. He bowled the 33rd televised 300 game in PBA Tour history at the PBA Tour Finals on June 5, 2022.

On July 10, Troup's PBA League team, the Portland Lumberjacks, won the Elias Cup, after which Troup was named League MVP. Troup later outlasted 11 other players to win the PBA Strike Derby, a non-title special event held in conjunction with the PBA League competition.

On July 20, Troup won the ESPY Award for Best Bowler.

=== 2023: PBA Hall of Fame eligibility ===
On June 25, 2023, Troup won his second career PBA Tour Finals, held this season in Arlington, Washington. Having qualified in the eighth and final spot for this event, Troup defeated top seed and eventual PBA Player of the Year E. J. Tackett in the Group 1 stepladder finals. He then went on to face Group 2 winner Kris Prather in the race-to-two points championship match. Troup swept Prather, 268–225 and 266–236 to win his tenth career PBA Tour title. With the win, Troup is now title-eligible for the PBA Hall of Fame.

=== 2024: second major championship ===
On February 4, 2024, Troup won his eleventh PBA Tour title and second major at the U.S. Open. Qualifying as the #3 seed, he defeated three previous U.S. Open champions on his way to the title. In his first match, he knocked off #4 seed E. J. Tackett, then defeated Jason Belmonte in the semifinal match. Against top seed Anthony Simonsen, Troup rolled to a 223–181 victory, donning his first-ever green jacket to go with the $100,000 top prize.

On February 24, Troup won his second title of the 2024 season and 12th title overall at the Just Bare PBA Indiana Classic. For the second time this season, Troup climbed from the #3 seed to the title match, this time defeating E. J. Tackett in the championship match. In the 2024 season, Troup finished sixth in Tour points and cashed $199,615.

On December 10, Troup was awarded the PBA's Tony Reyes Community Service Award, an annual award given since 2013 that "recognizes a current PBA member who exemplifies extraordinary community service, charitable or educational contributions over the course of a PBA season." Troup was honored because of his annual holiday charity tournament that he organized in 2022. The tournament has grown every year and has raised nearly $40,000 to give Christmas presents to needy children in Troup's native North Carolina.

=== 2025 ===
Troup had 13 cashes and made 8 match play rounds in 2025, but did not win a title. He cashed $101,100 for the year.

Troup ranked #16 on the PBA's 2025 "Best 25 PBA Players of the Last 25 Seasons" list. The ranking was based on a points system that took into account standard titles, major titles, top-five finishes and Player of the Year awards.

== Professional wins ==
=== PBA Tour wins (12) ===
Legend
Major championships (2)
Japan Invitational (0)
World Series of Bowling (0)
PBA Tour standard events (10)

No.	Date	Tournament	Championship Match	Runner(s)-up	Money ($)
1	16 May, 2015	PBA Wolf Open	229–179	(United States) Marshall Kent	10,000
2	16 Apr, 2017	Roth/Holman PBA Doubles Championship (with Jesper Svensson)	279–195	(United States) E. J. Tackett & (United States) Marshall Kent	24,000 (12,000 each)
3	9 Sep, 2018	Storm Lucky Larsen Masters	248–232	(Australia) Jason Belmonte	16,498
4	1 Feb, 2020	PBA Jonesboro Open	290–269	(United States) Chris Barnes	30,000
5	29 Feb, 2020	Roth/Holman PBA Doubles Championship (with Jesper Svensson)	234–205	(United States) E. J. Tackett & (United States) Marshall Kent	30,000 (15,000 each)
6	19 Jul, 2020	PBA Tour Finals	204–223; 237–170 (RO: 40–39)	(United States) Anthony Simonsen	30,000
7	21 Feb, 2021	PBA Players Championship	257–212	(United States) Dick Allen	250,000
8	16 May, 2021	PBA Playoffs	235–206; 248–300; 223–210; 221–209	(Australia) Sam Cooley	100,000
9	15 May, 2022	PBA Playoffs	217–184; 276–257; 201–279; 288–222	(United States) Tommy Jones	100,000
10	19 Jul, 2023	PBA Tour Finals	268–225; 266–236	(United States) Kristopher Prather	30,000
11	4 Feb, 2024	U.S. Open	223–181	(United States) Anthony Simonsen	100,000
12	24 Feb, 2024	Just Bare PBA Indiana Classic	228–213	(United States) E. J. Tackett	25,000

RO = After splitting the two-game final, Troup won in a 9th/10th frame roll-off.

=== Non-title PBA wins ===
1. 2022 PBA King of the Lanes
2. 2022 PBA Strike Derby
3. 3x member of PBA Elias Cup champions (2019, 2020 & 2022 with Portland Lumberjacks, 2022 MVP)
4. 2025 PBA Elite League Battle of the Brands Championship (member of champions Team Storm)

== Awards and records ==
- PBA Southern Region Player of the Year (2013)
- PBA Southern Region Player of the Year (2014)
- Chris Schenkel PBA Player of the Year (2021)
- Harry Smith PBA Points Leader (2021)
- Highest earnings in a single PBA Tour season ($496,900 in 2021)
- BPAA Dick Weber Bowling Ambassador Award (2022)
- PBA League Most Valuable Player (2022)
- Best Bowler ESPY Award (2022)
- PBA Tony Reyes Community Service Award (2024)
- Ranked #16 on the PBA's "Best 25 PBA Players of the Last 25 Seasons" list (2025)

== PBA career statistics ==
Statistics are through July 2022.

Season	Events	Cashes	Match Play	CRA+	PBA Titles	Average	Earnings ($US)
2010-11	1	0	0	0	0	211.83	0
2011-12	3	1	0	0	0	211.83	1,000
2012-13	14	0	0	0	0	209.83	100
2014	7	2	0	0	0	215.44	16,423
2015	17	12	7	4	1	216.84	34,136
2016	20	13	9	2	0	221.44	43,920
2017	32	17	8	2	1	218.91	72,745
2018	28	16	7	3	1	215.01	79,546
2019	25	16	7	5	0	216.47	67,204
2020	14	10	9	3	3	---	135,300
2021	16	11	11	8	2	220.34	496,900
2022	15	12	11	2	1	220.81	213,950
2023	20	16	11	2	1	216.38	145,400
2024	19	14	11	5	2	222.51	199,615
2025	19	15	13	1	0	223.52	101,100
Totals	251	157	106	37	12	---	$1,607,829

+CRA = Championship Round Appearances

== Personal life ==
Kyle is the son of eight-time PBA Tour winner Guppy Troup, the two constituting the fourth father-son pair to each win PBA Tour titles (following Dick and Pete Weber, Don and Jimmy Johnson, and Don and Eugene McCune). This group has since been joined by Eugene and Kevin McCune.

Troup has become one of the more recognized players on tour due to his throwback Afro hairdo, Partridge Family bus-styled attire, and other unique choices of trousers, similar to his father, who was known for his flamboyant public persona. Kyle's nicknames on Tour are "Afro Fish", "The Pro with the Fro", and the "Bob Ross of Bowling".

On his Facebook and Instagram feeds and during the PBA Tour Finals broadcast in June 2023, Kyle announced he was moving to the Louisville, Kentucky area with his fiancee, Breanna Stewart. In his Fox TV appearance on February 25, 2024, his profile showed his residence as Mt. Washington, Kentucky. On August 23, 2025 Kyle and Breanna were married.

== In the media ==
After being knocked out of the 2019 PBA Tour Playoffs in the second round, Troup provided analysis for the final four and championship finals live broadcasts (aired June 1 and 2 on Fox), along with Jason Belmonte and the regular PBA broadcast team of Rob Stone and Randy Pedersen.

Troup is one of five featured PBA players in the Ben Stiller-produced documentary Born to Bowl, which premiered on HBO and HBO Max March 16, 2026.
