= Anthony Simonsen =

American ten-pin bowler

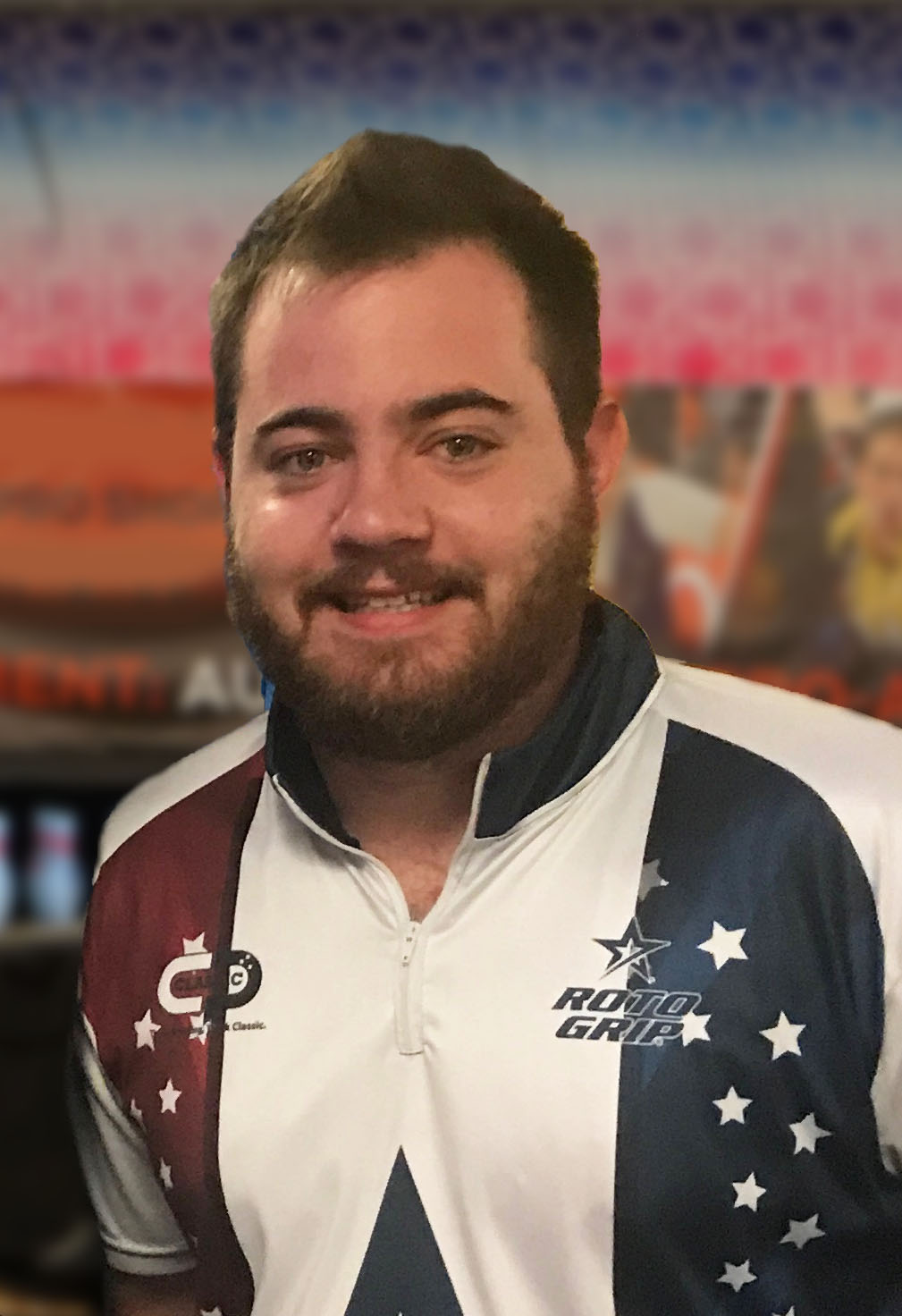
- Simonsen in 2019

Personal information
- Full name: Anthony Walter Simonsen
- Nickname: Simo
- Born: January 6, 1997 (age 29) Austin, Texas, U.S.
- Years active: 2014–present
- Height: 5 ft 8 in (172 cm)

Bowling Information
- Affiliation: PBA
- Rookie year: 2014
- Dominant hand: Right (two-hand delivery)
- Wins: 17 PBA Tour (5 majors); 8 PBA Regional Tour; 1 EBT
- 300-games: multiple
- Sponsors: Roto Grip, Vise Grips, 3G, Coolwick

Anthony Walter Simonsen (born January 6, 1997) is an American professional ten-pin bowler. He has been a member of the Professional Bowlers Association (PBA) since 2014. Simonsen became known in bowling fan circles on Valentine’s Day 2016, when he earned the distinction as the youngest player in history to win a PBA major championship (USBC Masters), at the age of 19 years, 39 days. He is now the youngest player in history to own five major PBA Tour titles. He uses the two-handed shovel-style delivery with a dominant right hand. At age 25, Simonsen eclipsed $1 million in career PBA earnings during the 2022 season. He topped $2 million in career earnings during the 2026 season. Simonsen has also bowled internationally as a multi-year member of Team USA.

Simonsen is a pro staff member for Roto Grip bowling balls, Vise Grips finger inserts and 3G shoes. He is also sponsored by Coolwick sportswear. A native of Little Elm, Texas, Simonsen now resides in Las Vegas, Nevada.

== Early life ==
Simonsen grew up in Mesquite, Texas and, as the son of regular league-bowling parents, he took up the game at an early age. By age 12, he was beating some of the nation's best collegiate bowlers in tournaments, like Wichita State University alum Kris Prather. Said Prather, "I'm bowling next to this kid who's two-handed...he's striking like every single shot and walking around like he owns the building. I wish I had that kind of confidence when I was that age." By age 15, Simonsen had dropped out of school and was working the night shift at Plano Super Bowl in Plano, Texas, also driving to as many local tournaments as possible. "If there was a bowling tournament within seven hours, I was bowling the tournament, no question about it." He began bowling in professional tournaments by age 16, his entry fees staked by some fellow bowlers in exchange for a percentage of the teenager's earnings.

== Amateur accomplishments ==
As an 18-year-old, Simonsen captured a win in doubles (with partner Mark Sleeper, Jr.) at the 2015 USBC Open Championships.

Simonsen first earned a spot on Team USA in 2016. He and his Team USA teammates won the 2019 Weber Cup over Team Europe. Simonsen participated in 11 of the 32 matches, going 5–1 in singles, 1–2 in doubles, and 1–1 in team.

In the 2020 Weber Cup, Simonsen and Team USA again defeated Team Europe, 23–18. Overall in the event, Simonsen participated in 12 of 41 matches, going 4–1 in singles, 1–4 in doubles, and 1–1 in team. In his third singles match against England's Dom Barrett, Simonsen rolled a 300 game. Simonsen also competed in the 2021 Weber Cup. In the USA's 17–18 loss to Team Europe, Simonsen participated in 12 of 35 matches, going 4–3 in singles, 2–0 in doubles, and 0–3 in team.

== PBA career ==
Simonsen became a PBA member in 2013 at age 16. This followed some success on the PBA regional circuit, where he won two Regional tournaments as a non-member. Simonsen has won 17 PBA Tour titles (with five majors) and eight PBA Regional titles. He also has one European Bowling Tour (EBT) title to his credit, earned at the 2018 Storm Irish Open.

=== 2015 season ===
In his first full season on the PBA Tour, Simonsen made the cash-line cut in seven of 16 tournaments, and qualified for match play five times.

=== 2016 season ===
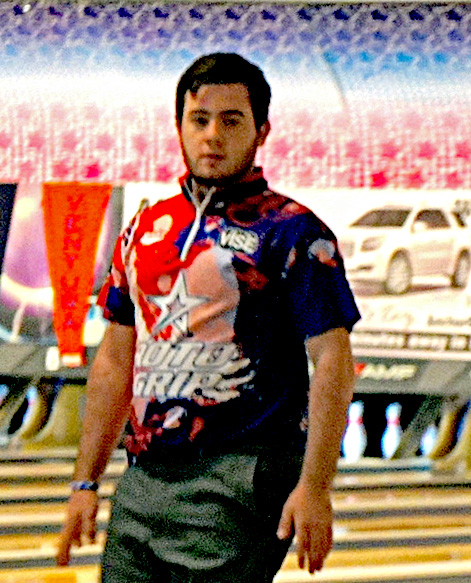
Simonsen at a 2016 tournament (age 19)

Simonsen's first PBA Tour title came on December 18, 2015, at the Mark Roth/Marshall Holman PBA Doubles Championship, where he teamed with Connor Pickford. (This was considered a 2016 season title.) The victory made Simonsen the second-youngest winner of a standard PBA Tour event, at 18 years, 346 days. He was only one day older than Norm Duke when Duke won the 1983 PBA Cleveland Open at 18 years, 345 days old.

Simonsen made history on February 14, 2016, when he won his first PBA Tour singles title and first major at the USBC Masters in Indianapolis. This win made Anthony the youngest player ever, at age 19 years, 39 days, to win a PBA major title. PBA Hall of Famer Mike Aulby had held this distinction since 1979, when he won the PBA National Championship at age 19 years, 83 days. Simonsen qualified for two more televised finals in major tournaments during 2016, finishing fourth at the U.S. Open in November and fifth at the PBA World Championship in December. He appeared in the championship round (the final stage of a tournament) seven times this season.

=== 2017 season ===
On February 26, 2017, Simonsen won the World Bowling Tour (WBT) Men's Finals in Las Vegas, NV, cashing $20,000. The finals included the top three points earners from 2015 and 2016 WBT events. While presented by the PBA, this event does not award a PBA title. Simonsen captured his third PBA title on May 29, 2017, at the PBA Xtra Frame Wilmington Open.

As one of the top eight money leaders from the start of the 2015 season through the 2017 USBC Masters, Simonsen was invited to participate in the inaugural Main Event PBA Tour Finals in May 2017. He placed eighth in the event.

=== 2018 season ===
Simonsen finished runner-up to Sweden's Jenny Wegner in the 2018 Brunswick Euro Challenge, held in Munich, Germany. Simonsen won a scratch victory of 213–211 in the final match, but because Wegner accepted the eight pins per game handicap offered to female competitors, Simonsen lost the match and a PBA title by an official score of 219–213. On August 19, Simonsen won his fourth PBA title at the Gene Carter's Pro Shop Classic in Middletown, Delaware. Simonsen gained some attention with this latest victory when he used a "backup ball" (as a right-hander, he put reverse rotation on the ball so it hooked like a left-hander's shot) during both match play and one of the finals matches after the right side of the lane had become difficult to play. While USBC and PBA rules do not allow a bowler to switch to his or her opposite hand for any sanctioned shot during a given season, Simonsen's technique was legal. He still used a dominant right hand, but rotated the ball in the opposite direction versus his conventional shot.

On October 16, Simonsen won his fifth PBA Tour title at the FloBowling PBA Wolf Open in Owasso, Oklahoma. Having qualified as the #1 seed, he won his lone championship round match over Andrew Anderson. With the win, Simonsen joined Jesper Svensson as the only players in history to have five PBA Tour titles by age 21.

=== 2019 season ===
On February 17, 2019, Simonsen won his sixth PBA Tour title and second major at the 2019 PBA Players Championship in Columbus, Ohio. As the #2 seed in the stepladder finals, he defeated Kyle Troup in the semi-final match 259–202, then upset #1 seed Jason Belmonte (going for a record 11th major) in the final match 232–212 to claim the title. Simonsen's victory made him the youngest player (22) in PBA history to win two major championships. The previous record holder, Billy Hardwick, won his second major championship at age 23. With two majors and at least five titles overall, Simonsen is also the youngest player in history to become title-eligible for the PBA Hall of Fame.

Simonsen qualified as the #4 seed for the inaugural PBA Tour Playoffs. He made it to the Final Four on June 1, but lost in the semifinal to eventual champion Kristopher Prather.

On August 29, Simonsen won his seventh PBA Tour title in exciting fashion at the PBA Bear Open in Aurora, Illinois. After the final match against E. J. Tackett finished in a 267–267 tie, both Simonsen and Tackett recorded strikes on the first ball of sudden-death roll-off. Simonsen then struck on the second ball of sudden death, while Tackett rolled a 9-count, giving Anthony his second title of the 2019 season.

Overall in 2019, Simonsen made eight championship round appearances and cashed $171,340, both career highs. Simonsen won an additional $100,000 in the Bowlero Elite Series event on September 13, 2019, which is not counted in his PBA earnings.

=== 2020 season ===
Simonsen qualified as the #1 seed for the finals of the 2020 U.S. Open, but lost the championship match to Jason Belmonte, 226–201. In the PBA World Championship finals on March 15, he again finished runner-up to Belmonte. Based on 2020 points, Simonsen qualified as the #4 seed for the season-ending PBA Tour Playoffs. He made it all the way to the championship match, only to suffer another runner-up finish, this time to Bill O'Neill. Despite the 2020 season being shortened by COVID-19, Simonsen posted a new career high in earnings with $227,130.

=== 2021 season ===
After yet another runner-up finish in a major (2021 PBA Tournament of Champions), Simonsen finally broke through with his eighth title in the PBA Tour Finals on June 27. Having secured the #1 seed in Group 2 qualifying, Simonsen topped Kris Prather in his group stepladder final, then defeated Group 1 winner Kyle Troup for the championship.

=== 2022 season ===
On February 6, 2022, Simonsen won his ninth PBA Tour title and third major at the 2022 U.S. Open, held in Indianapolis, Indiana. Qualifying as the #2 seed for the stepladder finals, he defeated Jason Belmonte in the semifinal match and E. J. Tackett in the championship match to claim the victory. The win makes Simonsen the youngest bowler in PBA history (25 years, 31 days) to win three major titles. The previous record holder was PBA Hall of Famer Dave Davis, who won his third major in 1968 at age 25 years, 343 days.

On April 3, Simonsen won his tenth PBA Tour title, fourth major, and second major of the 2022 season, narrowly defeating Hall of Famer Norm Duke in the final match at the USBC Masters, 219-216. Simonsen is now one of nine players in history to win multiple Masters titles, and is the first player to win both the U.S. Open and USBC Masters during the same season since Mike Aulby did so in 1989. At age 25 years, 87 days, Simonsen is also the youngest player in history to claim four PBA major championships. Simonsen reached the 10-title plateau at age 25 years, 87 days, and supplanted Wayne Webb (25 years, 90 days), to become the fourth-youngest to do so. Simonsen joins Pete Weber (24 years, 247 days), Marshall Holman (24 years, 274 days) and Aulby (25 years, 79 days).

=== 2023 season ===
On February 24, 2023, Simonsen won his eleventh PBA Tour title at the PBA Wichita Classic. Qualifying as the #1 seed, he defeated Dom Barrett 257–213 in the championship match to claim the victory. Two weeks later, Simonsen qualified as the top seed for the PBA Dave Small's Jackson Classic, but lost the March 9 championship match to E. J. Tackett.

On April 2, Simonsen qualified as top seed, then defeated #2 seed Michael Martell 243–222 in the title match to defend his USBC Masters title. During match play for this event, he went undefeated and set a Masters scoring record by averaging 250.4 over 18 games. This included a 300 game and an 845 series in his final three-game match that locked up the #1 seed. This was Simonsen's twelfth PBA tour title and third Masters title. He became just the fourth player (after Dick Hoover, Billy Welu and Jason Belmonte) to successfully defend a title in this event. Along with Belmonte and Mike Aulby, Simonsen is the one of three players in history to win the Masters at least three times. At 26 years, 86 days old, Simonsen became the youngest player in history to win five PBA major championships, and became the first player to win five major titles before the age of 30.

On July 30, 2023, Simonsen won the Storm Striking Against Breast Cancer Mixed Doubles event with partner Danielle McEwan. This gave Simonsen his third title of the 2023 season and 13th title overall. Through the 16 title events of the 2023 season, Simonsen never finished out of the top 10. He finished the season second in points and also second in earnings, with a career-high $347,500.

On December 8, 2023, Simonsen finished runner-up to E. J. Tackett for the Chris Schenkel PBA Player of the Year award.

=== 2024 season ===
In the 2024 U.S. Open, Simonsen dominated qualifying, leading his next closest competitor by 221 pins to earn the top seed. However, Simonsen lost his lone TV finals match on February 4 to Kyle Troup, finishing in second place. Simonsen rebounded two weeks later, climbing the ladder from the fifth seed in the TV finals to win the PBA Pete Weber Missouri Classic. This was Simonsen's 14th PBA Tour title.

On June 9, Simonsen won his second title of the 2024 season at the PBA Tour Finals in Bethlehem, Pennsylvania. In this "postseason" event featuring the top eight players in Tour points over the last two seasons, Simonsen was the Group 2 winner after defeating Jason Belmonte in the group stepladder final. He went on to face Group 1 winner Marshall Kent, who had defeated Simonsen in the title match of the Tournament of Champions earlier this season. After splitting two games in the "race to two points" final (246–210, 200–248), Simonsen won the 9th/10th frame roll-off, 40–38, to take the title. He is the second-youngest player (27 years, 155 days) to reach 15 titles, behind only Mark Roth (27 years, 126 days).

On July 28, Simonsen and partner Danielle McEwan repeated as champions at the Storm Striking Against Breast Cancer Mixed Doubles event. This earned Simonsen his 16th PBA Tour title.

For the 2024 season, Simonsen led the Tour in titles (3) while finishing third in Tour points and cashing $235,850. For the second straight season, he finished runner-up to E. J. Tackett in the Chris Schenkel PBA Player of the Year vote.

=== 2025 season ===
Simonsen battled nagging injuries during the 2025 season, but still made the finals of two major events. He survived the play-in round for the U.S. Open to take the #5 seed for the February 2 final stepladder, but lost his opening match to François Lavoie.

In the USBC Masters, Simonsen qualified as the #2 seed and defeated Bill O'Neill to advance to face part-time pro Gary Haines in the March 30 championship match. As the only undefeated player through qualifying and match play, Haines had to be defeated twice to be denied the title. Simonsen won the first match 207–172, but lost the second match and a chance at a fourth USBC Masters crown by a score of 192–186.

Simonsen finished the 2025 season ninth in points and cashed $111,350 in earnings.

Despite being six days shy of his third birthday at the turn of the century, Simonsen ranked #8 on the PBA's 2025 "Best 25 PBA Players of the Last 25 Seasons" list, a testament to what he's accomplished in a short span of PBA seasons. The ranking was based on a points system that took into account standard titles, major titles, top-five finishes and Player of the Year awards.

=== 2026 season ===
In the 2026 U.S. Open, Simonsen qualified as the top seed, but lost his lone match in the March 8 championship finals to Patrick Dombrowski in heartbreaking fashion. Needing three strikes in the tenth frame to force a roll-off, Simonsen got the first two strikes before leaving a 7–10 split on a pocket shot, losing 197–195. He now has three runner-up finishes in the U.S. Open to go with one win.

He would rebound the very next week. On March 15, Simonsen was again the top seed and won the PBA Illinois Classic over Finland's Santtu Tahvanainen with a 290–279 victory. This is his 17th PBA Tour title, tying him with Carmen Salvino for 24th on the all-time titles list. Coincidentally, Simonsen won this title on the Carmen Salvino 43 oil pattern.

For the 2026 season, Simonsen ranked fourth in points and sixth in earnings ($141,125). The earnings pushed him over the $2 million mark for his career.

== Professional wins ==
=== PBA Tour wins (17) ===
Legend
Major championships (5)
Japan Invitational (0)
World Series of Bowling (0)
PBA Tour standard events (12)

No.	Date	Tournament	Championship Match	Runner(s)-up	Money ($)
1	Dec 18, 2015*	Roth/Holman PBA Doubles Championship (with Connor Pickford)	223–173	(Colombia) Andres Gomez & (United States) Josh Blanchard	22,000 (11,000 each)
2	Feb 14, 2016	USBC Masters	245–207	(Canada) Dan MacLelland	50,000
3	May 29, 2017	PBA Xtra Frame Wilmington Open	224–177	(United States) Rhino Page	10,000
4	Aug 19, 2018	PBA Xtra Frame Gene Carter's Pro Shop Open	216–194	(United States) Matt Sanders	15,000
5	Oct 16, 2018	FloBowling PBA Wolf Open	239–226	(United States) Andrew Anderson	10,000
6	Feb 17, 2019	PBA Players Championship	232–212	(Australia) Jason Belmonte	50,000
7	Aug 29, 2019	FloBowling PBA Bear Open	267–267 (SD: 20–19)	(United States) E. J. Tackett	10,000
8	Jun 27, 2021	PBA Tour Finals	212–247; 279–202 (RO: 50–49)	(United States) Kyle Troup	30,000
9	Feb 6, 2022	U.S. Open	232–165	(United States) E. J. Tackett	100,000
10	Apr 3, 2022	USBC Masters	219–216	(United States) Norm Duke	100,000
11	Feb 24, 2023	PBA Wichita Classic	257–213	(United Kingdom) Dom Barrett	25,000
12	Apr 2, 2023	USBC Masters	243–222	(United States) Michael Martell	100,000
13	Jul 30, 2023	Storm Striking Against Breast Cancer Mixed Doubles w/Danielle McEwan	8873–8755	(United States) Tommy Jones & (United States) Shannon Pluhowsky	25,000 (12,500 each)
14	Feb 18, 2024	PBA Pete Weber Missouri Classic	225–156	(United States) Bill O'Neil	25,000
15	Jun 8, 2024	PBA Tour Finals	246–210; 200–248 (RO: 40–38)	(United States) Marshall Kent	30,000
16	Jul 28, 2024	Storm Striking Against Breast Cancer Mixed Doubles w/Danielle McEwan	10411–10176	(United Kingdom) Dom Barrett & (Latvia) Diana Zavjalova	25,000 (12,500 each)
17	Mar 15, 2026	Groupon PBA Illinois Classic	290–279	(Finland) Santtu Tahvanainen	30,000

* = Tournament finals were held in December 2015, but this counts as a 2016 season title. There was an earlier Mark Roth-Marshall Holman doubles tournament in February 2015 that counted as a 2015 title.

SD = After tying in the title match, Simonsen won the one-ball sudden-death rolloff (10–10, 10–9).

RO = After splitting the two-game final, Simonsen won in a 9th/10th frame roll-off.

== Career statistics ==
Statistics are through the last complete PBA season.

Season	Events	Cashes	Match Play	CRA+	PBA Titles (majors)	Average	Earnings ($)
2012–13	1	0	0	0	0	190.04	0
2014	4	0	0	0	0	200.72	0
2015	16	7	5	0	0	216.36	26,030
2016	28	22	13	7	2 (1)	221.85	143,277
2017	26	18	7	2	1	220.08	83,184
2018	30	23	13	4	2	217.87	124,825
2019	27	18	12	8	2 (1)	216.78	171,340
2020	13	11	8	6	0	---	227,130
2021	17	13	10	7	1	221.14	188,325
2022	15	11	11	6	2 (2)	220.83	274,975
2023	21	21	17	12	3 (1)	225.08	347,500
2024	18	14	11	7	3	225.33	235,850
2025	17	8	6	2	0	220.16	111,350
2026	17	11	6	3	1	222.28	141,125
Totals	247	176	118	64	17 (5)	---	$2,074,938

+CRA = Championship Round Appearances

== In the media ==
=== Simonsen: Leave it Behind ===
Simonsen is the namesake of the 2019 FloBowling documentary Simonsen: Leave it Behind. The documentary examines Simonsen's childhood grind and path to professional bowling superstardom. It is available via the FloBowling website and is exclusive to the service's subscribers.

=== Rolling Stone feature ===
Simonsen was the subject of a Rolling Stone article in January 2024, titled, "Meet the Gen Z Hothead Burning Up Pro Bowling".

=== Born to Bowl ===
Simonsen is one of five featured PBA players in the Ben Stiller-produced documentary Born to Bowl, which premiered on HBO and HBO Max March 16, 2026.
