= E. J. Tackett =

Professional ten-pin bowler

EJ Tackett
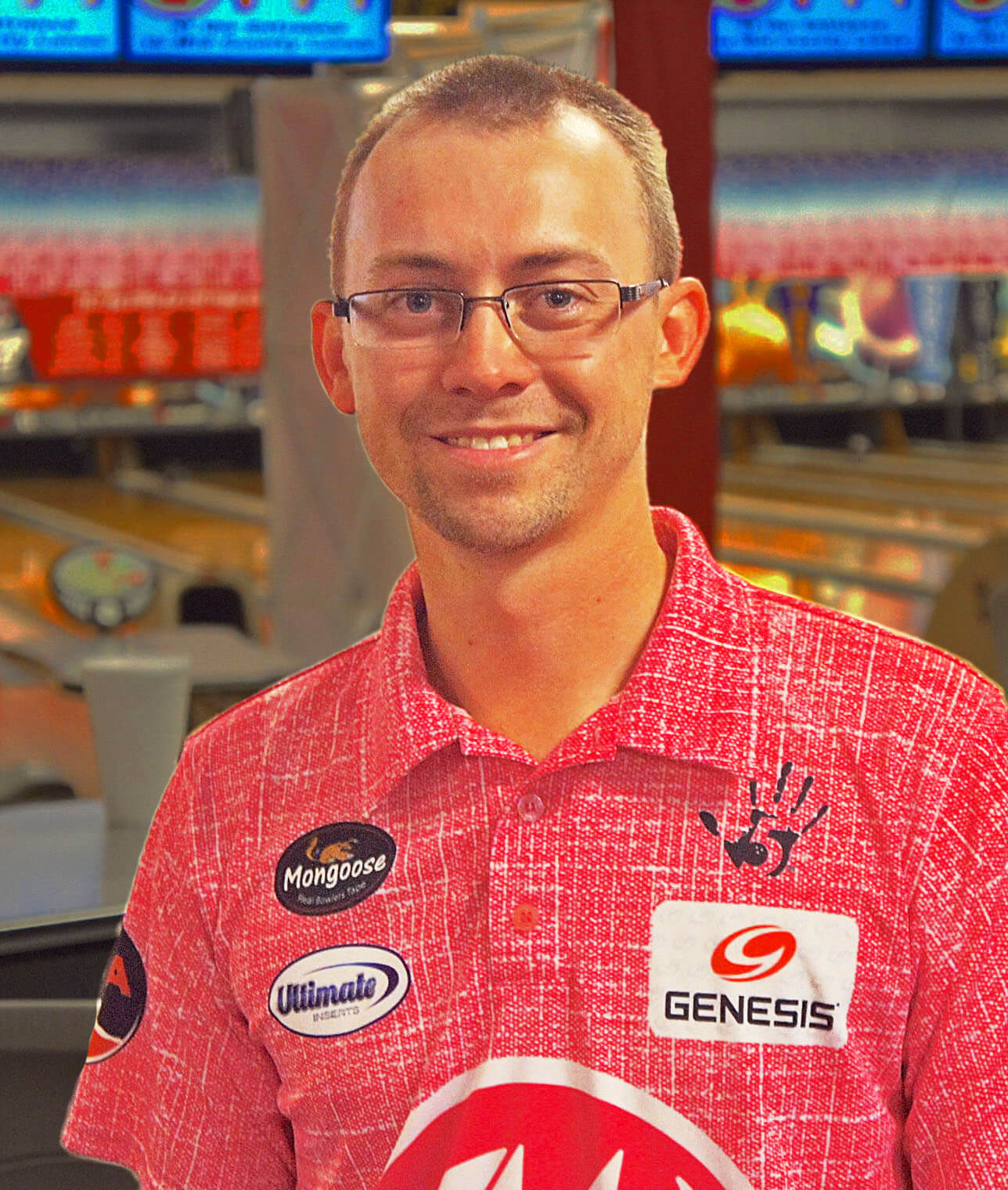
- Tackett in 2017

Personal information
- Nickname: Squirrel
- Born: August 7, 1992 (age 34) Huntington, Indiana, U.S.
- Home town: Bluffton, Indiana, U.S.
- Years active: 2011−present
- Height: 170 cm (5 ft 7 in)

Sport
- Country: United States
- Sport: Ten-pin bowling
- League: PBA
- Turned pro: 2012

Achievements and titles
- National finals: 28 PBA Tour (8 majors) 15 PBA Regional Tour; 5× Chris Schenkel PBA Player of the Year (2016, 2023-2026); 5× George Young PBA High Average Award (2022-2026); PBA Triple Crown winner First ever "four peat" of the PBA World Championship

Edward Dean Tackett Jr. (born August 7, 1992), more commonly known as EJ Tackett, is an American professional ten-pin bowler. A member of the Professional Bowlers Association (PBA) since 2012, Tackett has won 28 PBA Tour titles (the tenth most all-time), including eight major championships, and is one of nine professional bowlers that have completed the PBA Triple Crown (earned by winning the PBA World Championship, PBA Tournament of Champions and U.S. Open majors). He is the only player to earn a "four-peat" in a major championship, winning the PBA World Championship in 2023, 2024 and 2025, and 2026, after previously becoming one of only four players to ever "three-peat" a major championship.

Tackett is a five-time PBA Player of the Year, first earning the award in the 2016 season, then in four consecutive seasons (2023 through 2026), the only player ever to win four in a row. He was runner-up for the award in 2017 and 2018. Tackett is right-handed and uses a cranker-style delivery. He has been called a "unicorn" in the sport, because of his ability to use a one-handed, thumb-in delivery to achieve RPM rates comparable to most two-handed bowlers.

Tackett is a pro staff member for MOTIV bowling balls, Dexter shoes, JoPo Grips, Genesis kinesiology tape and High 5 Gear sportswear.

== Amateur career ==
Tackett was a member of Junior Team USA in 2011 and 2013, and made Team USA in 2018. At the 2018 WBT World Men's Championships in Hong Kong (November 24–December 5), Tackett won two gold medals: Trios (with teammates Kyle Troup and Andrew Anderson) and All-Events.

In the 2020 Weber Cup, Tackett was named MVP as Team USA defeated Team Europe, 23–18. After the European bowlers closed the gap to four points following an initial nine-point American lead, Tackett won his final two singles matches over Swede Jesper Svensson, including the clinching match. Overall in the event, Tackett participated in 13 of 41 matches, going 3–2 in singles, 5–1 in doubles, and 1–1 in team.

== PBA career ==
=== Early years ===
Tackett made four championship round appearances over the 2012–13 and 2014 seasons, but did not win a title. He was named the PBA Rookie of the Year for the 2012–13 season. His first PBA Tour title came on June 28, 2015, at the PBA Xtra Frame Lubbock Southwest Open. Later in the 2015 season, Tackett qualified as the top seed for the PBA World Championship, but lost in the final match to Gary Faulkner Jr.

=== 2016: PBA Player of the Year ===
Tackett had a highly successful 2016 season. He won his second career title on April 24 at the PBA Xtra Frame Storm Open.

He captured his third title (and first on U.S. television) on September 10 at the PBA Fall Swing Bear Open, also winning an additional $10,000 a day later in the non-title King of the Fall Swing event.

Tackett's fourth PBA title came in the PBA Team Challenge in Las Vegas, NV on November 1. (This was the first PBA team event to award individual titles to the winning players.)

Tackett then won his first PBA major and fifth title overall at the PBA World Championship, on December 11 in Reno, NV, topping former World Championship winner Tom Smallwood in the final match.

The four titles in 2016 helped E.J. earn PBA Player of the Year honors for the season. He is the third-youngest player (24) to be named Player of the Year, behind Billy Hardwick (1963) and Andrew Anderson (2018). Tackett led the Tour in wins (4) and earnings ($168,290), and was third in Tour average (224.49).

Tackett's high rev rate allows the ball to hook sufficiently, even when lofted over the left gutter.

=== 2017 ===
Tackett's run of victories continued into 2017, as he won the season's opening event on January 14 at the DHC PBA Japan Invitational. This was his sixth PBA Tour title.

On February 19 in Shawnee, Oklahoma, Tackett won his second major and seventh PBA title overall at the Fire Lake PBA Tournament of Champions.

Tackett continued his 2017 success with a win in the inaugural Main Event PBA Tour Finals on May 20. This invitational tournament featured the top eight players in PBA earnings from the start of the 2015 PBA Tour season through the 2017 USBC Masters. As the #2 seed, Tackett survived the round-robin and group stepladder matches, eventually defeating #1 seed Jason Belmonte in the three-game final. This was his third victory of 2017 and eighth title overall.

Although he did not have a win in any of the seven Storm PBA Xtra Frame events in 2017, Tackett finished with the most points over the duration of the series, earning a $20,000 bonus and the Storm Cup.

On November 19, Tackett won his ninth PBA title in the PBA Scorpion Championship, part of the PBA World Series of Bowling in Reno, NV.

Tackett duplicated his four titles (one major) from the previous season while making a career-high nine championship round appearances, amassing 2017 earnings of over $230,000. He would finish runner-up to Jason Belmonte for Player of the Year.

=== 2018 ===
Tackett won his tenth PBA title on July 2, 2018, at the PBA Xtra Frame Parkside Lanes Open in Aurora, Illinois. At age 25 years, 329 days, he is the sixth-youngest player in PBA history to win 10 career PBA Tour titles (behind Pete Weber (24 years, 247 days), Marshall Holman (24 years, 274 days), Mike Aulby (25 years, 79 days), Anthony Simonsen (25 years, 87 days), and Wayne Webb (25 years, 90 days).

Tackett won his 11th PBA title on July 29, 2018, teaming with female professional Liz Johnson to win the Storm PBA/PWBA Striking Against Breast Cancer Mixed Doubles championship in Houston, Texas.

Tackett won his 12th PBA title and third of the 2018 season at the FloBowling PBA Bear Open, held October 17–18 in Owasso, Oklahoma.

Tackett was announced as a finalist for the 2018 PBA Player of the Year award, but the award was won by Andrew Anderson.

=== 2019 ===
On January 6, 2019, Tackett won the World Bowling Tour Men's Finals, a non-title event in which the finalists are based on performance in global events throughout the previous season.

On July 21, 2019, Tackett won the Barbasol PBA Tour Finals for the second time in three seasons, earning his 13th PBA Tour title.

=== 2020 ===
Tackett qualified as the #1 seed for the finals of the 2020 PBA Players Championship, but lost the title match to Bill O'Neill by one pin, 233–232. The COVID-shortened 2020 season was Tackett's first without a title since 2014.

=== 2021 ===
On August 1, 2021, Tackett and partner Danielle McEwan won the PBA-PWBA Striking Against Breast Cancer Mixed Doubles tournament, leading the event wire-to-wire (from opening round of qualifying through the finals). The win earned Tackett his 14th PBA Tour title.

=== 2022 ===
After a historic performance in qualifiers, Tackett earned the #1 seed in the 2022 US Open. However, a disastrous performance in the title match led to him losing 232–165 against Anthony Simonsen. That would only delay Tackett's 2022 title chase, as he and his partner Marshall Kent won the PBA WSOB XIII Roth-Holman Doubles Championship. The win earned Tackett his 15th PBA Tour title.

Tackett's 2022 season was enough to get him the #3 seed in the 2022 PBA Playoffs, where he would face a struggling Jesper Svensson. However, after splitting the first two games, Tackett would lose in the roll-off 38-24 after a heart wrenching 2-4-6-10 leave in the 10th frame.

On July 31, Tackett won his 16th PBA Tour title in the Storm Striking Against Breast Cancer Mixed Doubles tournament, with partner Diandra Asbaty. This was Tackett's third title in the event, and he has won with three different partners (Liz Johnson in 2018 and Danielle McEwan in 2021).

Tackett led the 2022 PBA Tour with a 225.27 average, was third in points and seventh in earnings with $160,675.

=== 2023: triple crown and second PBA Player of the Year award ===
For the second straight season, Tackett earned the #1 seed at the US Open. In the championship finals on February 5, 2023, he defeated Kyle Troup, 221–208. With this win, he became the ninth player in PBA history to capture the Triple Crown, thanks to his prior wins in the World Championship and Tournament of Champions in 2016 and 2017 respectively.

On 17 February, Tackett won the PBA Shawnee Classic. After qualifying as the #1 seed, he defeated Dom Barrett 231–226 in the championship match to claim his 18th career title.

On March 9, Tackett won the PBA Dave Small's Jackson (MI) Classic, defeating Anthony Simonsen in the final match with a convincing 277–199 victory. This gave Tackett three wins in the first five events of the 2023 PBA Tour season. Continuing his superb 2023 season, Tackett led the Tournament of Champions qualifying wire-to-wire to claim the No.1-seed, only to lose the March 19 title match to Jason Belmonte.

On April 17, Tackett won the PBA Cheetah Championship at World Series of Bowling XIV in Wauwatosa, Wisconsin. Having qualified as the #2 seed, he defeated Joseph Grondin in the semifinal match and B.J. Moore in the championship match. With this victory, Tackett became the seventeenth player in PBA history to win at least 20 titles, and it marked his third season winning four titles. He also became the second-youngest player, at 30 years, 253 days old, to reach the 20 title plateau, missing the mark set by Pete Weber by just 14 days. Tackett was born 14 days before Weber’s 30th birthday, and Weber and Tackett both won their 20th Tour titles on April 17, in 1993 and 2023, respectively, so exactly 30 years part making the 14 days between their birthdays the deciding 14 days younger Weber was when he won his 20th title. The next night, April 18, Tackett was the #2 seed for the PBA Scorpion Championship finals. He defeated Jesper Svensson in the semifinal match to move on to his sixth title match appearance of the season, but he then lost to No.1-seed Jakob Butturff in the finals.

On April 23, Tackett won his 21st PBA Tour title and 4th major at the 2023 PBA World Championship. As the No.1-seed for the finals, he defeated Jason Belmonte in the championship match 254–247 to claim the win. This was Tackett's second PBA World Championship title, and it marked his first season with two major wins.

In the May 1–4 qualifying for the PBA Players Championship, the season's fifth and final major, Tackett again earned the No.1-seed. This gave him the distinction of being the only player in PBA history to qualify as the No.1-seed in four major tournaments during the same season. However, Tackett would be upset in the May 7 quarterfinal round by fellow Indiana native Kevin McCune.

In the PBA Super Slam Cup, a special event held for the 2023 major champions, Tackett finished runner-up to Jason Belmonte. However, Tackett electrified the crowd and TV audience by rolling a 300 game in the semifinal match against Kevin McCune. Because it occurred in a non-title event, it will not be recognized as an official PBA Tour televised 300, but Tackett did earn a $10,000 bonus for his feat.

For the 2023 season, Tackett led the Tour in earnings with $458,450, which is the second-highest total in PBA history behind only Kyle Troup's record of $496,900 set in 2021. Tackett also led the PBA Tour in points (41,200), average (227.18), titles (5) and major titles (2). On December 8, 2023, Tackett was voted the Chris Schenkel PBA Player of the Year, his second such award in his career.

=== 2024: third PBA Player of the Year award ===
Although he had yet to win a title in 2024, Tackett tied a PBA record on March 3 by making his fifth consecutive TV finals appearance. He is one of several players in PBA history to accomplish this feat, but the first to do so since 2001 (Jason Couch). He broke through with his first title of the 2024 season in the World Series of Bowiling XV Shark Championship on April 17, 2024, and became the first person to win all three current animal oil pattern championships. With his 22nd title overall, Tackett tied Marshall Holman for 12th on the all-time PBA Tour titles list.

On April 21, Tackett won the 2024 PBA World Championship. As the #4 seed, he climbed the stepladder and defeated Matt Russo in the championship match 225–194 to claim his 23rd career title and 5th major, while becoming the first bowler since Jason Belmonte in 2019–2020 to successfully defend a World Championship title. After this victory, he stood alone in 12th place on the all-time PBA Tour titles list.

Tackett finished the 2024 winter-spring season first on the PBA points list, earning him the #1 seed for the PBA Playoffs in May. However, he was upset in the quarterfinal round by #9 seed and eventual winner David Krol.

On December 12, the PBA announced Tackett had won his third career and second consecutive Chris Schenkel PBA Player of the Year award. In addition to his two titles (one major) on the season, Tackett led the Tour in points (29,920), average (229.37) and earnings ($265,792). His average was a personal best and just 0.02 pins shy of the PBA Tour record set by Jason Belmonte in 2017. E.J. earned 67.5% of PoY votes from PBA members and the media, far ahead of second place finisher Anthony Simonsen (11% of the vote).

=== 2025: fourth PBA Player of the Year award ===
Tackett won his 24th PBA Tour title, sixth major, and second U.S. Open on February 2, 2025. Standing in 78th place and 200 pins outside the cut line for match play after two qualifying rounds, Tackett rallied to make the cut by 21 pins. After finishing match play as the #2 seed, Tackett eliminated previous U.S. Open winner Chris Via in the semifinal match. He then defeated top seed Andrew Anderson in the final match, 238–184, to don his second career green jacket.

On February 16, Tackett won his 25th PBA Tour title at the PBA Pete Weber Missouri Classic. Qualifying as the top seed, he defeated Dom Barrett in his lone televised finals match, 238–202. This win tied Tackett with Brian Voss for 11th place on the all-time PBA Tour titles list.

On March 15 at the PBA Mike Aulby Nevada Classic, Tackett survived the longest sudden death roll-off in PBA Tour history. After he and Tour rookie Ethan Fiore tied at 238 in the semifinal match, they both rolled the first six strikes in sudden death. Tackett then rolled a seventh strike while Fiore got a 9-count, sending Tackett to the final match. He would go on to lose that match to Andrew Anderson.

Tackett made the championship finals for all five 2025 World Series of Bowling events, finishing third in the Scorpion Championship, second in the Viper Championship, and fourth in the Chameleon Championship, before moving on to defend his title in the PBA Shark Championship. On March 19, EJ did just that, claiming his 26th PBA tour title at the PBA Shark Championship. The win tied him with Don Johnson for tenth place on the all-time PBA Tour titles list. As the top seed, Tackett defeated Tom Smallwood in the championship match, 265–206.

Upon qualifying as the second seed for the March 22 PBA World Championship finals, Tackett made his PBA-record seventh straight final round appearance (in singles events) overall. Tackett went on to win the PBA World Championship, his second major of the season and seventh overall, defeating Jason Belmonte in the final match, 242–222. In doing so, Tackett became the third player to earn a three-peat in the World Championship, joining Earl Anthony (who did it twice) and Belmonte. This was also Tackett’s 4th PBA World Championship, surpassing Walter Ray Williams Jr., Norm Duke and Belmonte, and now only trails Anthony’s 6 PBA World Championships. His 27th title put him alone in tenth place on the all-time PBA Tour titles list.

On April 5 (aired April 6), Tackett won the non-title PBA Strike Derby. In the semifinals, Tackett rolled 12 strikes in two minutes for his highest-scoring round. He then tied Jason Belmonte in the final round with 10 strikes, winning the sudden death roll-off, 10–9.

With wins in the 2025 U.S. Open and PBA World Championship, Tackett qualified as the #3 seed for the PBA Tournament of Champions finals on April 20, giving him a chance to accomplish the unprecedented: win all three PBA triple crown events in the same season. However, he would lose his first stepladder match to fifth-seeded Jakob Butturff.

Holding the top seed for the 2025 PBA Playoffs, Tackett won his quarterfinal and semifinal matches to meet #7 seed Jesper Svensson in the "race to three points" finale. Tackett won only one game, losing to Svensson three games to one. However, the $50,000 runner-up check pushed Tackett to $419,540 in season earnings, making him the first PBA player in history to cash over $400,000 in a season twice in his career ($458,450 in 2023 & 438,540 in 2025). Walter Ray Williams Jr. ($419,700 in 2002–03) and Kyle Troup ($496,900 in 2021) have each reached the milestone once. Tackett earned $1,162,782 in the 2023–2025 seasons, making him the first PBA bowler to earn over $1 million in just 3 seasons.

On June 8, Tackett suffered his third runner-up finish of the season, the second time to Andrew Anderson, at the PBA Tour Finals. After winning the Group 1 stepladder, Tackett lost the "race to two points" final match against Group 2 winner Anderson, two games to none.

Tackett finished the 2025 regular season with a Tour-leading 34,690 points, followed by Anderson with 18,120 points and Belmonte with 15,365 points. Combined, Anderson and Belmonte earned 33,485 points, more than 1,200 points less than Tackett’s 34,690 point tally. He also finished the season first in earnings ($438,540), average (228.60), titles (4), and top-ten finishes (12), all leading to his fourth Chris Schenkel Player of the Year award. He is the fifth player in PBA history to earn the award in three consecutive seasons, following Earl Anthony (1974–76, 1981–83), Mark Roth (1977–79), Walter Ray Williams Jr. (1996–98) and Jason Belmonte (2013–2015). He is also only the second bowler to win the George Young High Average Award in four consecutive seasons (2022–25), following Roth (1976–79).

=== 2026: World Championship four-peat, unprecedented fourth consecutive POY ===
Tackett started the 2026 season qualifying as the #1 seed at the PBA Players Championship, but he was the victim of the PBA's 36th televised 300 game by rookie Brandon Bonta in the February 22 championship match, losing 238–300. This was Tackett’s second runner-up finish at the PBA Players Championship; in 2020 he lost to Bill O’Neill by 1 pin, 232–233. It remains one of the two majors missing from Tackett’s PBA Tour career.

In Week 3 at the U.S. Open, the two-time and defending champion Tackett finished 12th, missing the stepladder finals by 133 pins. This was his lowest U.S. Open finish in five seasons, ending a streak of four top-4 finishes, with wins in 2023 and 2025.

In Weeks 4 and 5, Tackett made the TV finals for the 2026 Groupon PBA Illinois Classic and 2026 PBA Indiana Classic, but finished third place at both tournaments.

Week 6 was the USBC Masters, where Tackett was runner-up in 2014. A Masters win for Tackett would complete the Career Grand Slam as he already owns a Tournament of Champions, two U.S. Opens, and four World Championships. Out of 390 bowlers, Tackett initially qualified in 17th place, easily making the top-64 cut. In the double-elimination brackets, Tackett went undefeated and averaged 258.39 in his six 3-game matches (18 games total) to break Anthony Simonsen's 2023 match play record of 250.40. As the only undefeated player, Tackett earned the No. 1 seed for the televised finals. In 2025, the top seed in the stepladder finals had to be beaten twice as it was set up as a true double-elimination tournament. In 2026, a traditional five-player stepladder final round was used, and only one game would determine the winner. Tackett lost the championship match to David Krol, 195–196. Tackett and Krol were the only bowlers with just one loss. Krol pocketed $100,000, while Tackett settled for $50,000.

Tackett qualified as the top seed at the PBA World Championship, his third No.1 seed in a 2026 major tournament. He won the title on June 13 for his 28th PBA Tour title, eighth major, and fifth World Championship. He defeated Canada's Zach Wilkins in the final match, 188–181. This was Tackett's fourth consecutive PBA World Championship win, making him the first player ever to win the same PBA major in four consecutive seasons and, in fact, Tackett is the only player to win any PBA Tour tournament in four consecutive seasons.

Following the Storm PBA-PWBA Striking Against Breast Cancer Mixed Doubles tournament on August 2, Tackett's 2026 season average was 229.79, topping Jason Belmonte's 229.39 in 2017 for a new PBA record. (The season's final event, the Storm Lucky Larsen Masters in Helsingborg, Sweden, is not counted toward season averages, because lane conditions are not regulated by either the PBA or the USBC.) He also led the 2026 Tour in points (32,335; more than 14,000 ahead of second-place Zach Wilkins), earnings ($324,075) cashes (17), top-tens (13) and top-fives (10). On September 9, Tackett won his fifth Chris Schenkel PBA Player of the Year Award overall, and his unprecedented fourth in a row, with 85.5% of the vote.

=== Additional career highlights ===
Tackett surpassed the $1 million mark in career PBA earnings during the 2021 season, and eclipsed $2 million in earnings early in the 2025 season. He also owns 15 PBA Regional Tour titles.

== Professional wins ==
=== PBA Tour wins (28) ===
Legend
Major championships (8)
Japan Invitational (1)
World Series of Bowling (5)
PBA Tour standard events (14)

No.	Date	Tournament	Championship Match	Runner(s)-up	Money ($)
1	Jun 28, 2015	PBA Xtra Frame Lubbock Sports Southwestern Open	256-240	(United States) Bill O'Neill	15,000
2	Apr 24, 2016	PBA Xtra Frame Storm Open	217-210	(United States) Ryan Ciminelli	10,000
3	Sep 10, 2016	PBA Bear Open	212-199	(Sweden) Jesper Svensson	10,000
4	Nov 1, 2016	PBA Team Challenge w/'Merica Rooster Illusion team: Marshall Kent, Rhino Page, Ronnie Russell, and Chris Loschetter	234-220; 264-232	The BFFs team: (Sweden) Jesper Svensson, (United Kingdom) Dom Barrett, (Finland) Osku Palermaa, (United Kingdom) Stuart Williams, and (Sweden) Martin Larsen	30,000 (6,000 each)
5	Dec 8, 2016	PBA World Championship	246-180	(United States) Tom Smallwood	60,000
6	Jan 14, 2017	DHC PBA Japan Invitational	259-216	(Japan) Shota Kawazoe	42,970
7	Feb 19, 2017	PBA Tournament of Champions	208-203	(United States) Tommy Jones	50,100
8	May 20, 2017	PBA Tour Finals	666 [224 222 220]- 628 [225 191 212]	(Australia) Jason Belmonte	30,000
9	Nov 19, 2017	PBA Scorpion Championship	245-207	(Australia) Jason Belmonte	20,000
10	Jul 2, 2018	PBA Xtra Frame Parkside Lanes Open	210-171	(United States) Bill O'Neill	10,000
11	Jul 29, 2018	PBA/PWBA Striking Against Breast Cancer Mixed Doubles w/Liz Johnson	8,797-8,763	(Australia) Jason Belmonte & (United States) Diandra Asbaty	16,000 (8,000 each)
12	Oct 18, 2018	FloBowling PBA Bear Open	212-197	(England) Stuart Williams	10,000
13	Jul 21, 2019	PBA Tour Finals	225–247; 238–220 (RO: 45–26)	(United States) Jakob Butturff	30,000
14	Aug 1, 2021	PBA/PWBA Striking Against Breast Cancer Mixed Doubles w/Danielle McEwan (2)	9,279-9,067	(Canada) François Lavoie & (Indonesia) Tannya Roumimper	20,000 (10,000 each)
15	Mar 6, 2022	Roth/Holman PBA Doubles Championship w/Marshall Kent	245-192	(United States) Shawn Maldonado & (United States) D.J. Archer	25,000 (12,500 each)
16	Jul 31, 2022	PBA/PWBA Striking Against Breast Cancer Mixed Doubles w/Diandra Asbaty (3)	9,287-9,271	(United States) Jakob Butturff & (United States) Stefanie Johnson	20,000 (10,000 each)
17	Feb 5, 2023	U.S. Open	221-208	(United States) Kyle Troup	100,000
18	Feb 17, 2023	PBA Shawnee Classic	231-226	(United Kingdom) Dom Barrett	25,100
19	Mar 9, 2023	PBA Jackson Classic	277-199	(United States) Anthony Simonsen	25,000
20	Apr 17, 2023	PBA Cheetah Championship	259-178	(United States) B.J. Moore	20,100
21	Apr 23, 2023	PBA World Championship (2)	254-247	(Australia) Jason Belmonte	100,000
22	Apr 17, 2024	PBA Shark Championship	228-213	(Japan) Shota Kawazoe	20,000
23	Apr 21, 2024	PBA World Championship (3)	225-194	(United States) Matt Russo	100,000
24	Feb 2, 2025	U.S. Open (2)	238-184	(United States) Andrew Anderson	100,000
25	Feb 16, 2025	PBA Pete Weber Missouri Classic	238-202	(United Kingdom) Dom Barrett	30,000
26	Mar 19, 2025	PBA Shark Championship	265-206	(United States) Tom Smallwood	20,000
27	Mar 22, 2025	PBA World Championship (4)	242-222	(Australia) Jason Belmonte	100,000
28	Jun 13, 2026	PBA World Championship (5)	188-181	(Canada) Zach Wilkins	100,000

RO = After splitting the two-game final, Tackett won in a 9th/10th frame roll-off.

== Major championships ==
Legend
PBA Players Championship (0)
USBC Masters (0)
PBA Tournament of Champions (1)
US Open (2)
PBA World Championship (5)

=== Wins (8) ===
Year	Championship	Final Score	Runners-up
2016	PBA World Championship	246–180	(United States) Tom Smallwood
2017	PBA Tournament of Champions	208–203	(United States) Tommy Jones
2023	US Open	221–208	(United States) Kyle Troup
2023	PBA World Championship (2)	254–247	(Australia) Jason Belmonte
2024	PBA World Championship (3)	225–194	(United States) Matt Russo
2025	U.S. Open (2)	238–184	(United States) Andrew Anderson
2025	PBA World Championship (4)	242–222	(Australia) Jason Belmonte
2026	PBA World Championship (5)	188–181	(Canada) Zach Wilkins

=== Results timeline ===
Results not in chronological order.

Tournament	12-13	2014	2015	2016	2017	2018	2019
PBA Players Championship		NH	29	11	58	27	4
USBC Masters	150	2	35	T9	T9	188	83
PBA Tournament of Champions		18	17	5	1	13	2
U.S. Open	6	NH	117	20	95	4	49
World Championship	10	21	2	1	35	NH	9

Tournament	2020	2021	2022	2023	2024	2025	2026
PBA Players Championship	2	C6	M4	T5	17	110	2
USBC Masters	NH	T7	T7	T25	6	T9	2
PBA Tournament of Champions	7	32	9	2	3	4	8
U.S. Open	16	54	2	1	4	1	12
World Championship	3	3	8	1	1	1	1

Win
Top-10
DNP

"NH" = Not held
"T" = Tied for a place
"C" = Central Region Finals
"M" = Midwest Region Finals

=== Summary ===
Tournament	Wins	2nd	3rd	Top-3	Top-5	Top-10	Events
PBA Players Championship	0	2	0	2	4	4	12
USBC Masters	0	2	0	2	0	8	13
PBA Tournament of Champions	1	2	1	4	6	9	13
U.S. Open	2	1	0	3	5	6	13
PBA World Championship	5	1	2	8	8	11	13
Totals	8	8	3	19	23	38	64

== World Series of Bowling ==
=== Wins (5) ===
Year	Championship	Final score	Runner-up	Earnings ($)
2017	Scorpion Championship	245-207	(Australia) Jason Belmonte	20,000
2022	Doubles Championship w/Marshall Kent	245-192	(United States) Shawn Maldonado & (United States) D.J. Archer	25,000 (12,500 each)
2023	Cheetah Championship	259-178	(United States) B.J. Moore	20,000
2024	Shark Championship	228-213	(Japan) Shota Kawazoe	20,000
2025	Shark Championship	265-206	(United States) Tom Smallwood	20,000

=== Results timeline ===
Results not in chronological order.

Tournament	2013	2014	2015	2016	2017	2018	2019	2020	2021	2022	2023	2024	2025	2026
Cheetah Championship	6	27	40	15	66	NH	16	2	10	12	1	40	NH	22
Viper Championship	8	37	25	Not Held									2	NH
Chameleon Championship		11	15	6	95	NH		3	6	Not Held			4	24
Scorpion Championship	53	15	7	7	1	NH	5	14	9	5	2	7	3	5
Shark Championship	Not Held			5	46	Not Held				28	9	1	1	4
Doubles Championship	Not Held		Not Included						3	1	NI	22	Not Included	

Win
Top 10

"T" = Tied for a place

== PBA Tour career summary ==
Statistics are through the last complete PBA Tour season.

Season	Events	Cashes	Match Play	Champ. Rounds	PBA Titles (majors)	Average	Average Rank	Earnings ($)	Earnings Rank
2012–13	16	10	5	2	0	220.17	27	42,372	22
2014	13	9	5	2	0	221.09	14	74,150	14
2015	21	13	10	2	1	223.21	9	78,758	10
2016	26	21	16	5	4 (1)	224.49	3	168,290	1
2017	32	22	17	10	4 (1)	224.47	4	232,107	2
2018	33	21	12	5	3	217.91	6	103,992	6
2019	29	22	17	9	1	220.36	2	172,045	6
2020	14	12	10	8	0	221.85	3	149,250	5
2021	20	16	15	6	1	220.24	4	89,170	11
2022	16	15	15	6	2	224.46	1	160,675	7
2023	21	19	14	10	5 (2)	227.12	1	458,450	1
2024	19	16	3	2	2 (1)	229.37	1	265,792	1
2025	18	15	11	9	4 (2)	228.60	1	438,540	1
2026	18	17	N/A	10	1 (1)	229.79	1	324,075	1
Totals	296	228	150*	86	28 (8)			2,757,666	

* Does not include 2026 season

Win
Top 10
- As of June 30, 2026

== Awards and honors ==
- Harry Golden PBA Rookie of the Year (2012-13)
- 5x Chris Schenkel PBA Player of the Year (2016, 2023–2026); only player ever to win four in a row (2023–2026)
- 4x George Young High Average Award (2022–2025)
- Only player in history to qualify as the top seed in four PBA major tournaments during the same season (2023)
- Only player in history to make seven consecutive final round appearances in open singles events (2025)
- Only player to exceed $400,000 in earnings in multiple seasons (2023, 2025)
- Only player to exceed $1 million in earnings over a three-season span (2023–2025 & 2024–2026)
- Only player to win the same PBA Tour tournament in four consecutive seasons (PBA World Championship in 2023, 2024, 2025 and 2026)
- Only player to win the same PBA Tour major tournament in four consecutive seasons (PBA World Championship in 2023, 2024, 2025 and 2026)
- Ranked #2 on the 2025 PBA Tour's "Best 25 PBA Players of the Last 25 Seasons" list.
- Highest single-season average in PBA Tour history (229.79 in 2026)

== Personal ==
E.J. is married to Natalie (Goodman) Tackett as of 2019. Natalie was a state champion bowler in high school (2011) and a two-time Southwestern Illinois Bowler of the Year (2009, 2011). She has also competed for Junior Team USA (2013, 2014), and like her husband, is currently sponsored by MOTIV Bowling. In 2024, Natalie won the USBC Indiana Queens championship. She and E.J. have a son, Edward Dean Tackett III, whom they've nicknamed "Tripp".

E.J.'s brother, Zac Tackett, also competes on the PBA Tour. Zac made his first television appearance when he qualified as the #8 seed in the 2023 PBA Players Championship, and he has won four PBA Regional Tour titles.

== In the media ==
Tackett is one of five featured PBA players in the Ben Stiller-produced documentary Born to Bowl, which premiered on HBO and HBO Max March 16, 2026.
