= Ethan Fiore =

American professional ten-pin bowler

Personal information
- Born: September 7, 2004 (age 21) Valrico, Florida, US
- Years active: 2021–present
- Height: 190 cm (6 ft 3 in)

Bowling Information
- Affiliation: PBA
- Rookie year: 2021
- Dominant hand: Right (two-hand delivery)
- Wins: 1 PBA Tour (major); 3 PBA Regional Tour
- Sponsors: MOTIV Bowling, JoPo Grips, Zealo Gear Apparel, Dexter Bowling Shoes, Maple Family Centers

Ethan Fiore (born September 7, 2004) of Valrico, Florida is an American professional ten-pin bowler who competes as a member of the Professional Bowlers Association (PBA). At age 20, Fiore won the 2025 PBA Players Championship for his first PBA Tour title and first major championship. He bowls using the two-handed shovel style delivery with a dominant right hand.

He is sponsored by MOTIV Bowling, JoPo Grips, Zealo Gear Apparel, Dexter Bowling Shoes and Maple Family Centers.

== Professional career ==
Fiore turned pro at age 17, mostly bowling on the PBA Regional Tour, where he has three titles.

On the national PBA Tour, Fiore began the 2025 season as a non-exempt player, meaning he had to bowl in pre-tournament qualifier (PTQ) rounds just to make the initial field. On February 25, he advanced out of the PTQ for the PBA Mike Aulby Nevada Classic and eventually made the March 15 telecast as the #3 seed. After defeating Alec Keplinger for his first-ever televised victory, Fiore then faced three-time PBA Player of the Year E. J. Tackett in the semifinal match, which resulted in the longest sudden-death roll-off in PBA Tour history. Fiore struck on his final ball to tie the regulation game at 238–238 and force the roll-off. Both players threw six strikes in the roll-off. Tackett struck again on his seventh ball, while Fiore's seventh shot left a single 7-pin for a 9-count, giving the match to Tackett. Fiore would finish the tournament in third place, but earned the praise of Tackett: "He...had to strike to force the roll-off, and he threw a perfect shot. Then he threw a bunch of great shots in the roll-off. It was impressive to watch."

Fiore rebounded a month later. At the PBA Players Championship major in Jackson, Michigan, he finished qualifying and match play as the top seed. On April 13, he won his lone TV finals match against 22-year old Ryan Barnes, 232–179, for his first PBA Tour title. He is the fourth-youngest champion in a PBA major. Despite bowling in only 13 of 18 2025 season events (due to his early PTQ status), Fiore finished fifth in earnings ($150,095) and eighth in points.

On January 6, 2026, Fiore won the MOTIV AIK Invitational tournament, a non-PBA event held in Stockholm, Sweden.

On February 15, 2026, Fiore was named a captain's selection by E. J. Tackett for the USA vs. The World team match on April 4.

== Personal ==
Fiore lives in Valrico, Florida, and is the son of Rich and Kathy Fiore. He is a Christian, and spoke about a prayer he said on the eve of his first PBA telecast. "I wanted Him to just give me the ability to do it. I wasn't asking for Him to hand it to me. I wasn't asking for Him to throw me a lucky bone. I was just asking for Him to give me the ability to do it."
