= Don McCune =

American professional ten-pin bowler (1936–2026)

Personal information
- Born: October 9, 1936 Morrison, Illinois, U.S.
- Died: February 28, 2026 (aged 89) Las Vegas, Nevada, U.S.

Bowling Information
- Affiliation: PBA
- Rookie year: 1963
- Dominant hand: Right (stroker delivery)
- Wins: 8 PBA Tour; 2 USBC Open Championships

Donald Eugene McCune (October 9, 1936 – February 28, 2026) was an American right-handed ten-pin bowler most known for his years in the Professional Bowlers Association (PBA). McCune won eight PBA Tour titles in his career. Six of his eight titles came in the 1973 season, during which he was credited with unwittingly initiating a major change in the sport of bowling. He was a member of the PBA and USBC Halls of Fame.

== Early life ==
Donald Eugene McCune was born in Morrison, Illinois, on October 9, 1936. Growing up in Munster, Indiana, he was a member of the U.S. Army and began bowling seriously in all-Army leagues.

== Professional career ==
McCune became a PBA member 1963, and won his first PBA title at the 1968 Fort Worth Open. His second title was earned at the 1970 Houston-Sertoma Open.

By the early 1970s, bowling lane finishes had changed to a less flammable and more durable, but harder surface. Most bowling balls at the time were either hard rubber or hard plastic, rated at 80 or higher on a zero-to-100 hardness scale. Even the best professionals were struggling to get their bowling balls to hook on the lane. McCune once told Sports Illustrated, "I couldn’t even scratch the ball with a knife."

McCune consulted with a chemist to get a list of solvents that would chemically soften the ball. He tried one of the solvents (he wouldn't say what, but it was thought to be methyl ethyl ketone) and soaked his hard plastic bowling ball in it overnight. He then took the ball to a bowling center in Hammond, Indiana that he described as "a tough house" and rolled a 763 three-game series.

After winning only two PBA titles in ten years as a pro, McCune won three titles in just the first half of the 1973 season using the softer, soaked ball. McCune's tour roommate Jim Stefanich soon learned what Don was doing, and became the next player on tour to begin the soaking practice. Several other players followed. By mid-July, it was estimated that 22 of the 24 match play finalists in a Houston, Texas event were softening their bowling balls with chemicals. 1973 thus became known in bowling circles as "the year of the soaker". McCune would win three more 1973 titles on his way to earning PBA Player of the Year honors. He made ten (of his career 30) championship round appearances in 1973, made the final match seven times (going 6–1 in those matches), and earned a Tour-high $69,000 (equal to about $460,000 in 2022).

The trend McCune had started was perfectly legal at the time, but soon led to new PBA and ABC (now USBC) rules related to altering a bowling ball surface. However, bowling ball manufacturers took note, and began producing softer surface equipment like the Columbia 300 yellow dot and Brunswick LT-48, which each checked in at 55 to 60 on the hardness scale. PBA bowling writer Nolan Hughes stated in 2023: "Don's ingenuity revolutionized the sport. It commenced the arms race between bowling ball manufacturers, where each new ball must hook more than its predecessor."

McCune would not win another PBA title after 1973, but was inducted into the PBA Hall of Fame (Veterans category) in 1991. He also won two USBC Open championships (Classic Team in 1968 and Classic Doubles in 1969) and had ten career top-ten USBC Open finishes on his way to earning USBC Hall of Fame honors in 2013.

=== PBA Tour titles ===
1. 1968 Fort Worth Open (Fort Worth, Texas)
2. 1970 Houston-Sertoma Open (Houston, Texas)
3. 1973 Winston-Salem Classic (Winston-Salem, North Carolina)
4. 1973 Miller High Life Open (Milwaukee, Wisconsin)
5. 1973 Winston-Salem Open (Downey, California)
6. 1973 Fresno Open (Fresno, California)
7. 1973 Redwood City Open (Redwood City, California)
8. 1973 Japan Gold Cup (Tokyo, Japan)

== Personal life and death ==
McCune died on February 28, 2026, at the age of 89.

Don's son, Eugene McCune, has won three titles on the PBA Tour, making them the third father-and-son combination to each win national PBA Tour titles, after Dick and Pete Weber and Don and Jimmy Johnson. This group has since been joined by Guppy and Kyle Troup. In addition, Eugene McCune's son Kevin (Don's grandson) won the 2023 PBA Players Championship. This made Eugene and Kevin the fifth father-and-son combination to each win national PBA Tour titles, while making Don McCune the patriarch of the first three-generation family of national PBA Tour titleholders.

== Awards and recognition ==
- PBA Player of the Year (1973)
- Inducted into PBA Hall of Fame (Veterans Category), 1991
- Inducted into USBC Hall of Fame (Performance Category), 2013
