= Born to Bowl =

American documentary series

- Genre: Documentary
- Directed by: James Lee Hernandez; Brian Lazarte
- Narrated by: Liev Schreiber
- Country of origin: United States
- Original language: English
- No. of seasons: 1
- No. of episodes: 5

Production
- Executive producers: James Lee Hernandez; Brian Lazarte; Ben Stiller; John Lesher; Michael Tollin; Jonathan Vogler; Lev Ekster; Carissa Del Bene; Jonathan Hausfater; Chris Bowyer; Nancy Abraham; Lisa Heller; Bentley Weiner; Jared Polin; Isaac Solotaroff; Alexander Stevens
- Cinematography: Tom Pittenger
- Running time: 28 minutes
- Production companies: A24; Red Hour Productions; Mike Tollin Productions; Lucky Strike Entertainment; Blue Pixel; FunMeter

Original release
- Network: HBO
- Release: March 16 – April 13, 2026

Born to Bowl is a 2026 American documentary series directed and executive produced by James Lee Hernandez and Brian Lazarte. It explores the world of professional bowling, following five bowlers as they go on the Professional Bowlers Association (PBA) Tour. Ben Stiller serves as an executive producer under his Red Hour Productions banner. Liev Schreiber serves as narrator.

It premiered on March 16, 2026, on HBO.

== Premise ==
Follows professional bowlers Kyle Troup, Anthony Simonsen, E. J. Tackett, Cameron Crowe, and Jason Belmonte as they travel from event to event and compete on the PBA Tour in the 2025 season. Liev Schreiber serves as narrator.

== Episodes ==
No.	Title	Directed by	Original release date
1	"Making the Cut"	James Lee Hernandez; Brian Lazarte	March 16, 2026
2	"Hot Headed"	James Lee Hernandez; Brian Lazarte	March 23, 2026
3	"Who Do You Think You Are?"	James Lee Hernandez; Brian Lazarte	March 30, 2026
4	"The Real Kingpin"	James Lee Hernandez; Brian Lazarte	April 6, 2026
5	"Is This the End?"	James Lee Hernandez; Brian Lazarte	April 13, 2026

== Production ==
Ben Stiller serves as an executive producer under his Red Hour Productions banner, alongside A24.

On the decision to produce Born to Bowl, Stiller stated, "I have a real warm place in my heart for bowling. These guys who are the best in the world ... and what the reality of their lives is, which is pretty much 180 degrees from the reality of these other people who are at the top of their sport." Regarding the considerably lower purses for professional bowling tournaments versus other individual sports like golf and tennis, he added, "It was a little bit shocking to me that these guys have to do what they have to do just to survive on the bowling tour. But these guys, they do it because they love the sport, they're dedicated to it, and they want to be the best."
