= PBA Players Championship =

The PBA Players Championship is one of five major tournaments on the Professional Bowlers Association (PBA) Tour. It is one of three PBA Tour major events that are open only to PBA members, although Commissioner exemptions in recent years have allowed a handful of collegiate players to participate. (The U.S. Open and USBC Masters allow qualifying amateurs to enter.)

== Tournament history ==
The tournament began as the PBA Touring Players Championship in 1983 and ran every PBA Tour season through 2000. PBA Hall of Famer Steve Cook won the inaugural event. There were no Players Championship events under any name from 2001 to 2010. After the tournament returned to major status in the 2016 season, the PBA voted to retroactively award major titles to the winners of the three previous Players Championship events that decade (2011, 2013, 2015), stating the tournament "is a members-only event, and includes all of the elements of a major."

When Graham Fach won the 2016 PBA Players Championship, he became the first Canadian player to win a major, as well as the first Canadian to win PBA Tour title of any kind.

Through 2020, the tournament included a maximum starting field of 92 PBA players. The top PBA members in earnings from the previous season had entry priority over the general membership, and could fill up to 82 spots. The remaining 10 spots in the starting field were filled from a ten-game pre-tournament qualifier (PTQ). The tournament format has changed over the years. The format through 2020 included 42 games of qualifying: three rounds of six games each to determine the top 24 for match play, followed by three match play rounds of eight games each. All pins from the initial 18 games carry over into the match play round, with the match play rounds adding 30 bonus pins per victory to the total pinfall in the round. The field was then cut to the top five for the televised stepladder finals.

There is no set oil pattern. The 2018 Players Championship used the 44-foot Carmen Salvino oil pattern, while the 2019 event used the 45-foot Dragon pattern. The 2020 event featured the 38-foot Wayne Webb oil pattern, named after the PBA Hall of Famer whose bowling center in Columbus, Ohio hosted this tournament from 2016 through 2020. The 2023 event featured a dual oil pattern, with the 45-foot Dick Weber pattern on the left lane and the 39-foot Don Carter pattern on the right lane.

=== Revamp in 2021 ===
The PBA announced a revamped Players Championship for the 2021 season that opened up the event to the broader PBA membership. Five Regional events were hosted first. After 28 qualifying games (7 games on each of four oil patterns), each Region held its own stepladder finals broadcast. The five Regional winners then competed in the televised tournament finals. The five finals participants bowled a three-game set the day before the broadcast to determine seeding for the stepladder.

The Regional concept was introduced, in part, due to travel restrictions that resulted from the COVID-19 pandemic, and allowed most PBA professionals to compete in safe events closer to home.

The 2021 PBA Players Championship featured a $1 million prize fund, with a PBA record-tying $250,000 first place prize.

The regional qualifying/national finals format was retained for the 2022 season.

=== Format changes ===
In 2023, the tournament returned to a one-site format, taking place in North Brunswick, New Jersey. This season's event had 48 games of qualifying, with the top 12 qualifiers earning spots in the bracketed match play. The 5 through 12 seeds competed in head-to-head, single-game elimination matches (5 vs. 12, 6 vs. 11, etc.) on May 6, while the 1 through 4 seeds earned byes into the quarterfinal round. The quarterfinals on May 7 featured head-to-head, double-elimination matches in a "race to two points" format. In this format, any player winning both games advances to the semifinals; if the games are split one win each, a ninth-tenth frame roll-off determines who advances.

The semifinals on May 13 also used the race to two points format, while the final head-to-head match on May 14 was a best-three-of-five format. The Players Championship was the only 2023 PBA major that did not use a stepladder final round.

The standard stepladder finals returned for the 2024 and 2025 PBA Players Championships.

In 2026, 96 players (after PTQ participants added) bowled 24 games of qualifying (12 games each on the Viper 37 and Badger 50 oil patterns) to determine the cut to the 32-player Advancer's Round, where they bowled 6 more games on a dual pattern (Badger left lane, Viper right lane) to determine the cut to the 16-player Match Play Round. 16 more round-robin match play games on the dual pattern determined the top 5 for the televised finals.

== PBA Players Championship winners ==
=== 2026 Event ===
The 2026 PBA Players Championship was held February 17-22 at Bowlero Euless in Euless, Texas (qualifying & match play), with the live televised finals held at the International Training & Research Center in Arlington, Texas. The tournament had a starting field of 96 players (after February 16 PTQ qualifiers were added) and a total prize fund of $400,000 (1:3 cash), with a $100,000 top prize. A five-player stepladder round was used for the televised finals. Fourth-seeded Brandon Bonta, a PBA rookie, defeated top seed E. J. Tackett in the championship match to earn his first PBA Tour title and first major title. Bonta rolled the 36th PBA Tour perfect game in the final match, making him just the second player in PBA history to have a championship game 300 in his TV debut, following Bob Benoit (1988).

Match #1
4	Brandon Bonta	227
5	Spencer Robarge	173

Match #2
3	Jesper Svensson	216
4	Brandon Bonta	253

Match #3
2	Graham Fach	226
4	Brandon Bonta	247

Title match
1	E. J. Tackett	238
4	Brandon Bonta	300

Prize Pool:

1. Brandon Bonta (Wichita, Kansas) – $100,000
2. E. J. Tackett (Ossian, Indiana) – $50,000
3. Graham Fach (Urbana, Ohio) – $35,000
4. Jesper Svensson (Sweden) – $25,000
5. Spencer Robarge (Springfield, Missouri) – $20,000

=== Past Champions ===
Listing of all champions, runner-ups, and the scores from the title matches, dating back to the inaugural 1983 Touring Players Championship.

Year	Winner	Runner-up	Championship Title match
1983	(United States) Steve Cook	(United States) Steve Wunderlich	255–230
1984	(United States) Mark Roth	(United States) Marshall Holman	194–177
1985	(United States) Dave Husted	(United States) Mark Baker	268–238
1986	(United States) Mark Williams	(United States) Billy Young	246–214
1987	(United States) Tom Crites	(United States) Marshall Holman (2)	221–205
1988	(United States) Dave Ferraro	(United States) Walter Ray Williams Jr.	212–195
1989	(Venezuela) Amleto Monacelli	(United States) Brian Voss	235–209
1990	(United States) Duane Fisher	(United States) Jess Stayrook	248–244
1991	(United States) Dave Ferraro (2)	(United States) Roger Bowker	226–203
1992	(United States) Pete Weber	(United States) Harry Sullins	219–192
1993	(United States) Jason Couch	(United States) Parker Bohn III	238–214
1994	(United States) Walter Ray Williams Jr.	(United States) Butch Soper	228–213
1995	(United States) Ernie Schlegel	(United States) Randy Pedersen	237–236
1996	(United States) Mike Aulby	(United States) Parker Bohn III (2)	266–259
1997	(United States) Steve Hoskins	(United States) Danny Wiseman	233–184
1998	(United States) Dennis Horan, Jr.	(United States) Parker Bohn III (3)	245–202
1999	(United States) Steve Hoskins (2)	(United States) Parker Bohn III (4)	246–183
2000	(United States) Dennis Horan, Jr. (2)	(United States) Pete Weber	266–189
2001	Tournament not held in 2001		
2002	Tournament not held in 2002		
2003	Tournament not held in 2003		
2004	Tournament not held in 2004		
2005	Tournament not held in 2005		
2006	Tournament not held in 2006		
2007	Tournament not held in 2007		
2008	Tournament not held in 2008		
2009	Tournament not held in 2009		
2010	Tournament not held in 2010		
2011	(Australia) Jason Belmonte	(United States) Mike Devaney	255–238
2012	Tournament not held in 2012		
2013	(United States) Scott Norton	(United States) Sean Rash	219–191
2014	Tournament not held in 2014		
2015	(United States) Parker Bohn III	(United States) Ronnie Russell	237–237 (20–19 roll-off)
2016	(Canada) Graham Fach	(United States) Ryan Ciminelli	279–244
2017	(Australia) Jason Belmonte (2)	(United States) Anthony Simonsen	221–204
2018	(United States) Tom Smallwood	(Australia) Jason Belmonte	267–239
2019	(United States) Anthony Simonsen	(Australia) Jason Belmonte (2)	232–212
2020	(United States) Bill O'Neill	(United States) E. J. Tackett	233–232
2021	(United States) Kyle Troup	(United States) Dick Allen	257–212
2022	(Australia) Jason Belmonte (3)	(United States) Sean Rash (2)	210–202
2023	(United States) Kevin McCune	(United States) Jakob Butturff	(3–0); 206–178; 247–204; 220–175
2024	(United States) Bill O'Neill (2)	(United States) Tom Smallwood	209–178
2025	(United States) Ethan Fiore	(United States) Ryan Barnes	232–179
2026	(United States) Brandon Bonta	(United States) E. J. Tackett (2)	300–238

== Tournament highlights ==
- 1991: PBA Hall of Famer Dave Ferraro becomes the first bowler with multiple Players Championship victories, having also won this event in 1988.
- 2016: Graham Fach of Guelph, Ontario becomes the first Canadian player to win a title on the PBA Tour.
- 2022: Australian Jason Belmonte becomes the first player to win this event three times, having also won in 2011 and 2017.
- 2023: Kevin McCune makes the McCune family the only one with three generations of PBA Tour titlists. Kevin's father Eugene McCune won three PBA Tour titles, while grandfather Don McCune won eight.
