= Mike Aulby =

American ten-pin bowler

Personal information
- Born: March 25, 1960 (age 66) Indianapolis, Indiana, U.S.
- Years active: 1978–2003

Bowling Information
- Affiliation: PBA
- Rookie year: 1979
- Dominant hand: Left
- Wins: 29 PBA Tour (8 majors)
- Sponsors: Brunswick

Michael Aulby (born March 25, 1960) is an American former professional bowler and former member of the Professional Bowlers Association (PBA). He is one of only five PBA bowlers to win both the Rookie of the Year and Player of the Year award. (Tommy Jones, Chris Barnes, Jason Belmonte and E. J. Tackett are the others.) He is also the first player in history to complete a career "Super Slam", in which a bowler wins all five PBA Tour major tournaments at least once. He has since been joined in this exclusive club by Jason Belmonte. Aulby owns 29 career PBA Tour titles, currently 9th place all-time, with eight major titles among these wins. He is a member of both the PBA and USBC Halls of Fame.

== PBA career ==
Aulby joined the PBA Tour in 1978 and captured his first title and Rookie of the Year honors in 1979. His first title was a major in the 1979 PBA National Championship, as he became the youngest player (19 years, 83 days) to ever win a PBA major. That record stood until 2016, when Anthony Simonsen (19 years, 39 days) won the USBC Masters. On June 12, 1985, Aulby became one of the youngest players in PBA history (25 years, 79 days) to reach ten career PBA titles. As of the 2025 PBA Tour season, Aulby remains third-youngest on this list, behind Pete Weber (24 years, 247 days) and Marshall Holman (24 years, 274 days).

Aulby won 18 titles in the 1980s, nine in the 1990s, and one more in 2001, giving him 29 titles in all for 8th place all-time. The victory at the 2001 Silicon Valley Open also made him the first bowler in history to win at least one regular PBA Tour title in four different decades. Pete Weber, Norm Duke and Walter Ray Williams Jr. have since joined Aulby in earning this distinction. (Dick Weber and Johnny Petraglia have PBA titles in six decades, but each needed PBA Senior Tour wins in the fourth, fifth and sixth decades).

Aulby was named PBA Player of the Year in 1985 and 1995. In 1985, he won six titles (including his second PBA National Championship) and became the first PBA player to earn more than $200,000 in a single season. In 1989, he collected a then-record $298,237 in winnings, but was beaten out for Player of the Year by Amleto Monacelli. In the history of the PBA Tour, there have been 15 occasions where a player seeded in the 24th and final spot of the match play round went on to win the tournament. Aulby is one of only two players (with Pete Weber) to accomplish this feat twice, both times in the 1989 season.

On July 31, 1993, at the PBA Wichita Open, Aulby rolled the PBA's sixth televised 300 game in history to win the title over David Ozio, winning 300–279, in turn setting a record for highest combined score in a title match of 579. The record stands to this day. This marked just the second time a nationally televised 300 game was rolled in a title match (after Bob Benoit). Aulby was also the first left-handed player to bowl a perfect game on TV. In his 1995 PoY season, he won two titles, both of them majors.

Among Aulby's 29 titles are eight major championships. The eight majors place him in a tie with Walter Ray Williams Jr. for fourth-most all-time. Only Jason Belmonte (15), Earl Anthony (10) and Pete Weber (10) have won more major titles. Aulby is one of only nine bowlers to capture the PBA career "Triple Crown" (winning the U.S. Open, PBA National Championship and Tournament of Champions) -- and along with Norm Duke and Jason Belmonte, the only bowlers to add the ABC Masters title for a career "Grand Slam." Also Aulby was the first bowler in history to capture the career Super Slam (winning a Touring Players Championship for all five majors) when he won the 1996 Touring Players Championship (aka PBA Players Championship), an achievement unmatched for nearly a quarter of a century, until Jason Belmonte did so in 2020. Aulby, Belmonte and Anthony Simonsen are the only three PBA players to have won the Masters at least three times.

Aulby had 94 career top-five finishes, and was known as a true gentleman on tour. "Reserved, thoughtful, and pleasant, he's as polite when he's losing as when he's winning," commented Bowlers Digest writer Lyle Zikes in 2001. This led to Aulby winning the PBA's Steve Nagy Sportsmanship award two times. In 2009, Aulby won the Dick Weber Bowling Ambassador Award, an honor given annually by the Bowling Proprietors Association of America (BPAA) to the "bowling athlete who has consistently shown grace on and off the lanes by promoting the sport of bowling in a positive manner."

== Awards and recognition ==
- PBA Rookie of the Year (1979)
- 2x PBA Player of the Year (1985, 1995)
- 2x PBA Steve Nagy Sportsmanship Award (1994, 1995)
- Best Bowler ESPY (1996)
- Elected to PBA Hall of Fame, 1996
- Elected to USBC Hall of Fame, 2001
- Ranked 6th on the PBA's 2008 list of "50 Greatest Players of the Last 50 Years¨
- BPAA Dick Weber Bowling Ambassador Award (2009)

== Career tour titles ==
=== PBA Tour Titles ===
Major championships are in bold text.

1. **1979 PBA National Championship**, Las Vegas, Nevada.
2. 1980 Midas Open, Palatine, Illinois.
3. 1980 Tucson Open, Tucson, Arizona.
4. 1981 Canadian Open, Windsor, Ontario.
5. 1984 Indianapolis Open, Indianapolis, Indiana.
6. 1984 Brunswick Memorial World Open, Glendale Heights, Illinois.
7. 1985 AC-Delco Classic, Union City, California.
8. **1985 PBA National Championship**, Toledo, Ohio.
9. 1985 Old Spice Classic, Garden City, New York.
10. 1985 Denver Open, Denver, Colorado.
11. 1985 Showboat Doubles Classic w/Steve Cook, Las Vegas, Nevada.
12. 1985 Brunswick Memorial World Open, Glendale Heights, Illinois.
13. 1986 Showboat Doubles Classic w/Steve Cook, Las Vegas, Nevada.
14. 1988 Miller Lite Open, North Olmsted, Ohio.
15. 1989 Showboat Atlantic City Open, Atlantic City, New Jersey.
16. 1989 Budweiser Open, North Olmsted, Ohio.
17. **1989 U.S. Open**, Edmond, Oklahoma.
18. 1989 Showboat Doubles Classic w/Steve Cook, Las Vegas, Nevada.
19. **1989 ABC Masters**, Wichita, Kansas.
20. 1990 Greater Hartford Open, Windsor Locks, Connecticut.
21. 1992 Green Bay Classic, Green Bay, Wisconsin.
22. 1993 Showboat Invitational, Las Vegas, Nevada.
23. 1993 Wichita Open, Wichita, Kansas.
24. **1995 PBA Tournament of Champions**, Lake Zurich, Illinois.
25. **1995 ABC Masters**, Reno, Nevada.
26. 1996 Greater Baltimore Open, Baltimore, Maryland.
27. **1996 Touring Players Championship**, Harmarville, Pennsylvania.
28. **1998 ABC Masters**, Reno, Nevada.
29. 2001-02 Silicon Valley Open, Daly City, California.

== Personal ==
Aulby continues to live in the Indianapolis area. He currently owns two ice skating rinks in Carmel, IN, and a bowling alley (Mike Aulby's Arrowhead Bowl) in Lafayette, IN.

In the 2025 PBA Tour season, a tour stop was named in Aulby's honor: The PBA Mike Aulby Nevada Classic. The lanes featured the Mike Aulby 39 (39 feet in length) oil pattern, which debuted in the 2023 PBA Tour season.
