= Mark Roth =

American professional ten-pin bowler (1951–2021)

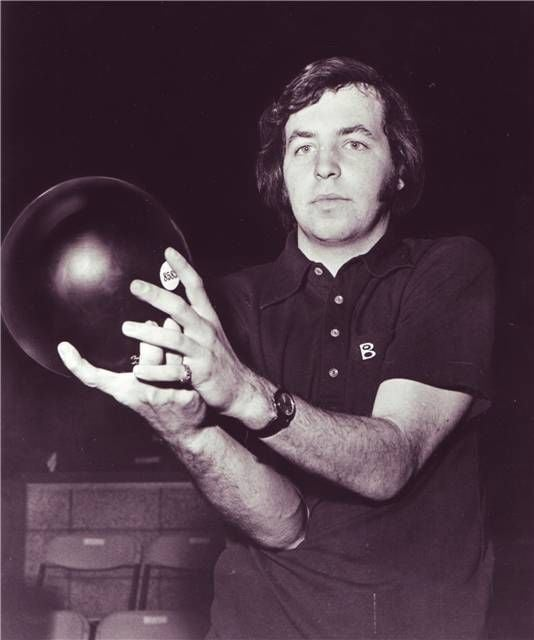

Personal information
- Born: Mark Stephen Roth; April 10, 1951 Brooklyn, New York City, U.S.
- Died: November 26, 2021 (aged 70) Fulton, New York, U.S.
- Years active: 1970–2009
- Height: 1.8 m (5 ft 11 in)

Bowling Information
- Affiliation: PBA
- Rookie year: 1970
- Dominant hand: Right (cranker delivery)
- Wins: 34 PBA Tour (2 majors); 2 PBA50 Tour
- Sponsors: Brunswick

Mark Stephen Roth (April 10, 1951 – November 26, 2021) was an American professional bowler. He won 34 PBA Tour titles in his career (sixth most all-time), and is a member of the PBA and USBC Halls of Fame. Roth was most dominant from 1975 through 1987, a stretch in which he made 107 televised finals appearances, captured 33 titles, and won four PBA Player of the Year awards. He is also known for having been the first professional bowler to convert a 7–10 split on national television.

== Early life ==
Roth was born on April 10, 1951, in Brooklyn, New York. His mother, Hilda (Rocker) Roth, was a legal secretary, and his father, Sidney, was a postal worker and a World War II Army veteran.

== Bowling career ==
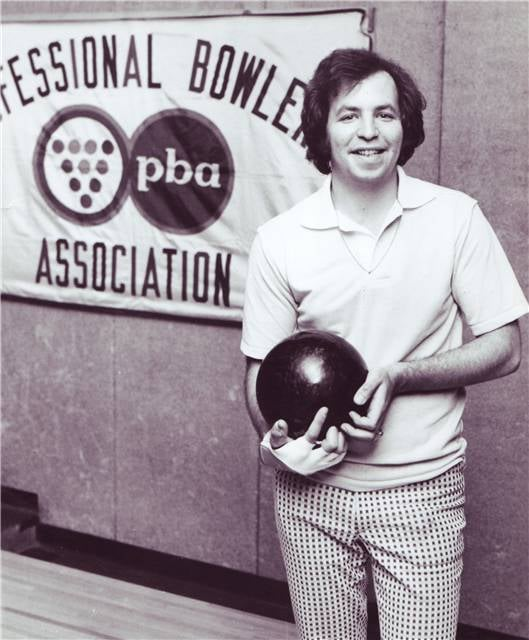
Mark Roth in early professional career

Roth made a splash on the PBA Tour with a cranking, hard-throwing style that spawned a generation of imitators for years to come. Often referred to as "The Original Cranker," he won 34 PBA titles, including two major championships which both came in 1984 (the U.S. Open and the Touring Players Championship). His first title came in 1975, winning the PBA King Louie Open in Overland Park, Kansas, with a final match 299 game against Steve Jones. He also holds, to this day, the PBA record for most single season victories, with eight titles in 1978. His seventh win of the 1978 season made Roth the youngest player (27 years, 126 days) to reach 15 PBA Tour titles, a distinction he still holds.

Roth won the Chris Schenkel PBA Player of the Year four times in his career, including 3-consecutive seasons (1977–1979), and won the honor again in 1984. Roth won the George Young High Average Award six times in his career (1976–1979, 1981, 1988). In 1978, Roth became the third player to win this award in three consecutive seasons (1976–1978), joining Wayne Zahn (1966–1968) and Earl Anthony (1973–1975). In 1979, Roth would take sole possession of the record after winning it for a fourth consecutive season. He held sole possession of this record for over four decades until 2025, when he was joined by E. J. Tackett (2022–2025). Tackett would break their tie in 2026 with his fifth consecutive high average award.

In addition to his two majors, Roth and his bowling doubles partner Marshall Holman won their third PBA Doubles title in 1984. So dominant were the pair in doubles tournaments, the PBA has held an annual event since 2015 called the Roth-Holman Doubles Championship. Roth is notable for having been the first bowler to pick up the 7–10 split on television, which he accomplished on January 5, 1980 in the ARC Alameda Open at Mel's Southshore Bowl in Alameda, California. Through 2026, he is still the only right-handed bowler to have converted the 7–10 on a PBA Tour telecast. The feat has been accomplished three times since, all three times by left-handers.

Roth captured his 32nd and 33rd PBA Tour titles in 1987, winning the Greater Buffalo Open at Thruway Lanes in Cheektowaga, New York and the Number 7 Invitational in Toronto, Ontario. He then went through the longest title drought in his career before winning his 34th and final title, the 1995 IOF Foresters Open at Club 300 Bowl in Markham, Ontario, Canada. Roth made his final television appearance in a PBA Tour event at the 1998 PBA Peoria Open, losing the opening match to Tom Baker, 265–190, to finish in fifth place. After reaching age 50, Roth captured two titles on the PBA Senior Tour (now the PBA50 Tour). In addition, he won one title on the short-lived Generations Bowling Tour in the 2006–07 season.

=== Awards and honors ===
- Inducted into PBA Hall of Fame, 1987.
- Inducted into USBC Hall of Fame, 2009.
- Inducted into the National Jewish Sports Hall of Fame, 2014.
- Ranked #5 on the PBA's 2008 list of "50 Greatest Players of the Last 50 Years".

=== Records and recognition ===
- 4-time winner of the Chris Schenkel PBA Player of the Year Award - 1977–1979, 1984
- 6-time winner of the George Young Memorial High Average Award - 1976–1979, 1981, 1988; one of only two players (with E. J. Tackett) to win this award in four consecutive seasons
- Single season record 8 PBA Tour titles - 1978
- Won 6 or more Tour titles in multiple seasons - 1978–1979 (tied w/Earl Anthony)

== Career tour titles ==
=== PBA Tour Titles ===
Major championships are in bold text.

1. 1975 King Louie Open, Overland Park, Kansas.
2. 1976 Rolaids Open, Florissant, Missouri.
3. 1976 Columbia 300 Open, Pittsburgh, Pennsylvania.
4. 1976 Northern Ohio Open, Fairview Park, Ohio.
5. 1977 Showboat Invitational, Las Vegas, Nevada.
6. 1977 PBA Doubles Classic w/Marshall Holman, San Jose, California.
7. 1977 Fresno Open, Fresno, California.
8. 1977 Southern California Open, Norwalk, California.
9. 1978 Miller Lite Classic, Torrance, California.
10. 1978 Quaker State Open, Grand Prairie, Texas.
11. 1978 King Louie Open, Overland Park, Kansas.
12. 1978 Greater Hartford Open, Windsor Locks, Connecticut.
13. 1978 City of Roses Open, Portland, Oregon.
14. 1978 San Jose Open, San Jose, California.
15. 1978 New England Open, Cranston, Rhode Island.
16. 1978 Brunswick Regional Champions Classic, Rochester, New York.
17. 1979 Rolaids Open, Florissant, Missouri.
18. 1979 King Louie Open, Overland Park, Kansas.
19. 1979 Columbia PBA Doubles Classic w/Marshall Holman, San Jose, California.
20. 1979 City of Roses Open, Portland, Oregon.
21. 1979 Kessler Classic, Greenwood, Indiana.
22. 1979 Lawsons Open, Fairview Park, Ohio.
23. 1980 Brunswick PBA Regional Champions Classic, Rochester, New York.
24. 1981 Showboat Invitational, Las Vegas, Nevada.
25. 1981 Lansing Open, Lansing, Michigan.
26. 1981 Columbia 300 Open, Fairview Park, Ohio.
27. 1983 Northern Ohio Open, Rocky River, Ohio.
28. **1984 U.S. Open, Oak Lawn, Illinois.**
29. 1984 Showboat Doubles Classic w/Marshall Holman, Las Vegas, Nevada.
30. 1984 Greater Detroit Open, Dearborn Heights, Michigan.
31. **1984 Touring Players Championship, Charlotte, North Carolina.**
32. 1987 Greater Buffalo Open, Cheektowaga, New York.
33. 1987 Number 7 PBA Invitational, Toronto, Ontario, Canada.
34. 1995 IOF Foresters Open, Markham, Ontario, Canada.

== Post-career ==
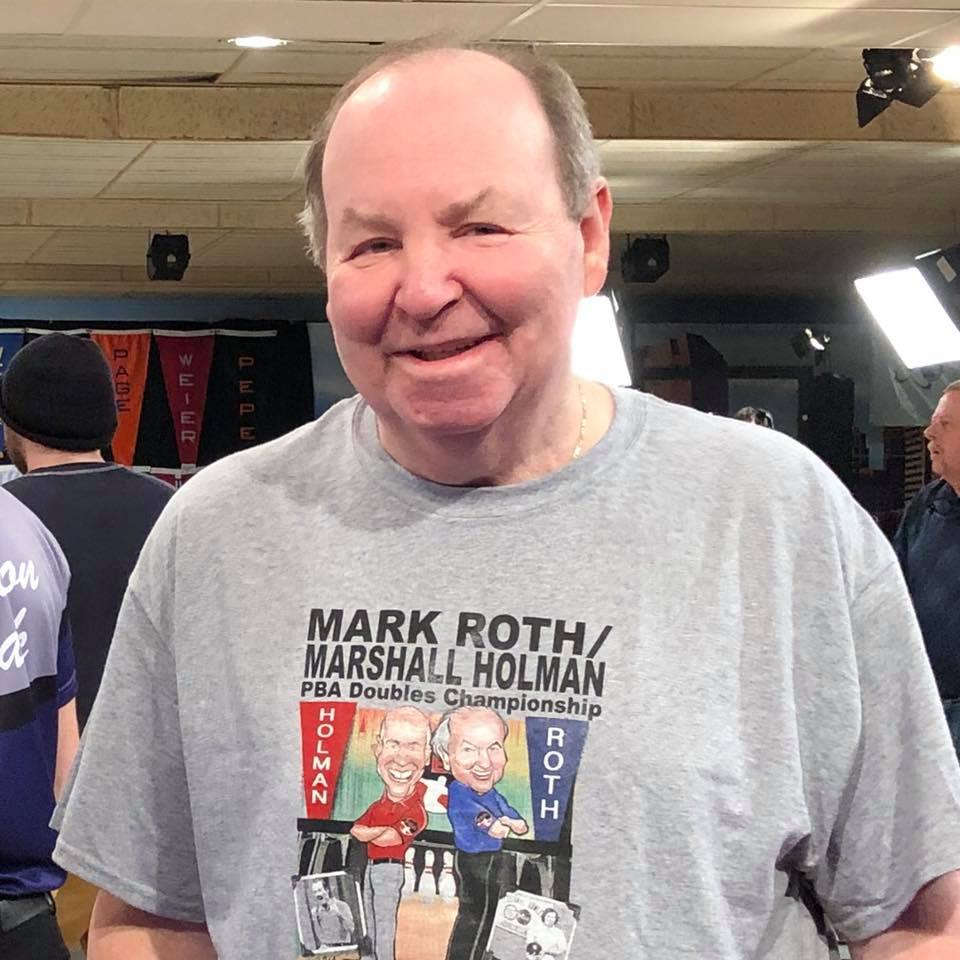
Mark Roth circa 2018

Around 2002, Mark ran a bowling center in Ellwood City, Pennsylvania named "Mark Roth's Hall of Fame Lanes." This only lasted about six months, and the partnership dissolved.

On June 4, 2009, Roth suffered a stroke, leaving him partially paralyzed on his left side. Following rehabilitation, he was seen in late March 2010 on his feet and moving around at the GEICO Mark Roth Plastic Ball Championship, a PBA Tournament named in his honor.

He spent a week in intensive care after a heart attack in April 2019.

== Personal life ==
Roth died on November 26, 2021, at the age of 70 in a hospital in Fulton, New York, due to congestive heart failure and complications following a diagnosis of pneumonia. Roth is survived by his wife Denise, and by Stephanie, his daughter by his first wife. Stephanie is a figure skater. Denise resides in Fulton, New York. He was Jewish.
