= Marshall Holman =

American sports broadcaster and retired professional ten-pin bowler

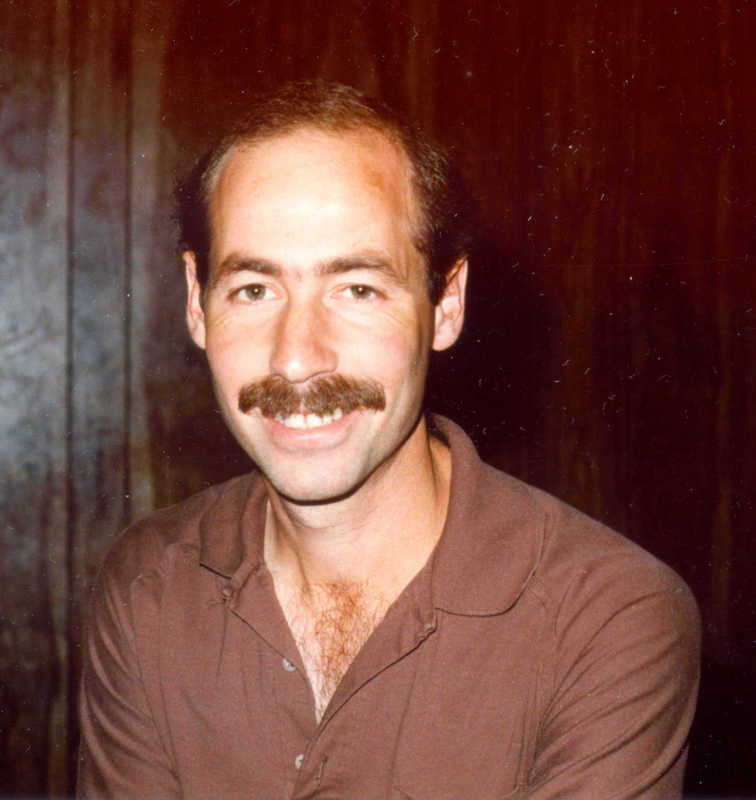
- Holman at the Greater Hartford Open (late 1980s)

Personal information
- Nationality: American
- Born: September 29, 1954 (age 71) San Francisco, California, U.S.
- Years active: 1974-1996 (competition); 1996-present (broadcasting)
- Height: 5 ft 9 in (175 cm)

Bowling Information
- Affiliation: PBA
- Dominant hand: right
- Wins: 22 PBA Tour (4 majors)
- Sponsors: Nike, Columbia 300

Marshall Holman (born September 29, 1954) is a retired professional ten-pin bowler and current American sports broadcaster. He was known for his flamboyant, fiery demeanor and his success on the PBA Tour from the mid-1970s to the end of the 1980s. He is one of only 17 players in history to reach at least 20 career PBA Tour titles. Holman was sponsored by Columbia 300 and Nike.

The first bowler on the PBA Tour to surpass $1.5 million in earnings, Holman won 22 titles (13th most all-time), including four majors (two U.S. Opens and two Tournament of Champions titles).

== Bowling career ==
=== 1970s ===
Holman's first PBA title came at the Fresno Open on July 8, 1975, when he was just 20 years old. He became the youngest winner in the Tournament of Champions, topping the field in the 1976 event when he was just 21 years, 201 days old. Holman would hold this record all the way up until 2016, when Jesper Svensson won that year's Tournament of Champions at just 20 years, 357 days old, 208-days younger than Holman. In 1979, Holman became the youngest bowler in history at (24 years, 274 days) old to reach 10 career PBA Tour titles. That record would later be broken by Pete Weber in 1987 at (24 years, 247 days old, by just 27 days). As of 2026, Holman and Weber remain the only PBA bowlers to win 10 career Tour titles before their 25th birthdays.

=== 1980s ===
After going without a title in the 1980 season, Holman roared back with three titles in 1981, including his second major at the BPAA U.S. Open where he defeated friend and doubles partner Mark Roth in the final match. One of the reasons Holman did not win any titles in 1980 was an incident at a tournament that June, when he kicked (and broke) the foul light on his lane out of frustration with his game, netting him a $2500 fine and a 10-tournament suspension. Before the decade was out, Holman would win his second U.S. Open (1985) and second Firestone Tournament of Champions (1986). He and partner Mark Roth won their third PBA Doubles title in 1984. So dominant were the pair in doubles tournaments, the PBA has hosted an annual event since 2015 called the Roth-Holman Doubles Championship.

Marshall was named PBA Player of the Year in 1987, despite not winning a title. However, he did lead the 1987 Tour in average and a few other statistical categories. This would turn out to be the only year a player without a title won Player of the Year. A PBA rule change now requires at least one title for a player to be put on the PoY ballot in a given season.

=== Later career ===
Holman's 22nd PBA title was earned at the 1996 PBA Ebonite Classic. This came eight years after he had last won on the PBA Tour. In this event, he defeated Wayne Webb, 246–235, in what turned out to be a very emotional battle that came down to the final frames. After Holman converted the tenth frame spare he needed to secure victory, the 42-year old exclaimed, "I'm back, baby, I'm back!" However, this would be his last title on Tour, as well as his last appearance in the televised finals.

Holman was a three-time winner of the George Young High Average award (1982, 1984 and 1987), and earned nearly $1.7 million on tour. Perhaps more impressive than his 22 titles, Holman made it to the final championship match 53 times (finishing runner-up 31 times) and had 63 more top-five finishes, for a total of 116 championship round appearances.

He was inducted into the PBA Hall of Fame in 1990 and into the Oregon Sports Hall of Fame in 2001. In 2006, he was inducted into the International Jewish Sports Hall of Fame. He is also a 2010 inductee to the USBC Hall of Fame in the Performance category. He was ranked 9th on the PBA's 2008 list of "50 Greatest Players of the Last 50 Years."

Holman indicated in a 2017 interview that he is retired from competitive bowling and does not anticipate taking part in any more PBA senior events.

=== PBA Tour titles ===
Major championships are in bold type.

1. 1975 Fresno Open (Fresno, California)
2. 1975 Hawaiian Invitational (Honolulu, Hawaii)
3. **1976 Firestone Tournament of Champions** (Akron, Ohio)
4. 1977 PBA Doubles Classic w/Mark Roth (San Jose, California)
5. 1977 Brunswick World Open (Glendale Heights, Illinois)
6. 1978 Ford Open (Alameda, California)
7. 1978 Northern Ohio Open (Fairview Park, Ohio)
8. 1979 Quaker State Open (Grand Prairie, Texas)
9. 1979 Columbia PBA Doubles Classic w/Mark Roth (San Jose, California)
10. 1979 Seattle Open (Seattle, Washington)
11. 1979 Brunswick Memorial World Open (Deerfield, Illinois)
12. 1981 Quaker State Open (Grand Prairie, Texas)
13. **1981 BPAA U.S. Open** (Houston, Texas)
14. 1981 King Louie Open (Overland Park, Kansas)
15. 1983 Aqua Fest Mr. Gatti's Open (Austin, Texas)
16. 1983 Venice Open (Venice, Florida)
17. 1984 Showboat Doubles Classic w/Mark Roth (Las Vegas, Nevada)
18. **1985 BPAA U.S. Open** (Venice, Florida)
19. 1985 Kodak Invitational (Rochester, New York)
20. **1986 Firestone Tournament of Champions** (Akron, Ohio)
21. 1988 Bowlers Journal Florida Open (Venice, Florida)
22. 1996 Ebonite Classic (Troy, Michigan)

== Awards & honors ==
- 1987 PBA Player of the Year
- Three-time George Young High Average Award winner (1982, 1984, 1987)
- First bowler to top $1.5 million in career PBA earnings
- Inducted into PBA Hall of Fame (1990)
- Inducted into USBC Hall of Fame (2010)
- Ranked #9 on PBA's 2008 list of "50 Greatest Players of the Last 50 Years"

== Broadcasting ==
Holman served as a color analyst alongside Mike Durbin on several ESPN and ESPN2 bowling telecasts from 1996 to 2001. From 1998 to 1999, he worked for CBS Sports and was teamed with Gary Seibel for telecasts when that network briefly showed PBA events.

After several years out of the booth, Holman has returned to the broadcasting arena. He served as a color analyst at the 2007 USBC Queens tournament and was in the broadcast booth (along with Nelson Burton, Jr.) for ESPN's five-week coverage of the 2007 and 2008 U.S. Women's Open events. He later provided commentary, alongside play-by-play man Dave Ryan, for the 2009 U.S. Women's Open telecasts. Holman was also the analyst for the live broadcast of the 2015 Men's U.S. Open, which ran on CBS Sports Network that season, and has appeared as an analyst at several Roth-Holman Doubles telecasts since then.

== Personal ==
At age four, Holman moved to the city of Medford, Oregon. His father, Phil, was a morning DJ at radio station KBOY (now KEZX) in Medford. He was nicknamed "Holman the Poleman", as he once did a radio show while pole sitting in 1959. Marshall was then dubbed a similar nickname "Holman the Bowlman", as well as "Medford Meteor"; color analyst Nelson Burton, Jr. provided this information during a PBA Tour telecast on ABC on February 2, 1985.

Earlier in his bowling career, as once mentioned in the American Bowlers Journal magazine in the 1980s, Holman had a girlfriend from the state of New Hampshire. He would occasionally try the sport of candlepin bowling, popular in his acquaintance's state of residence, while visiting there.

For several years after retiring as a full-time PBA member, Holman continued to receive commissioner's exemptions to participate in the PBA's Medford Classic. Holman is currently the marketing director at Diamondback Wines.

== See also ==
- List of select Jewish bowlers
