= List of ten-pin bowlers =

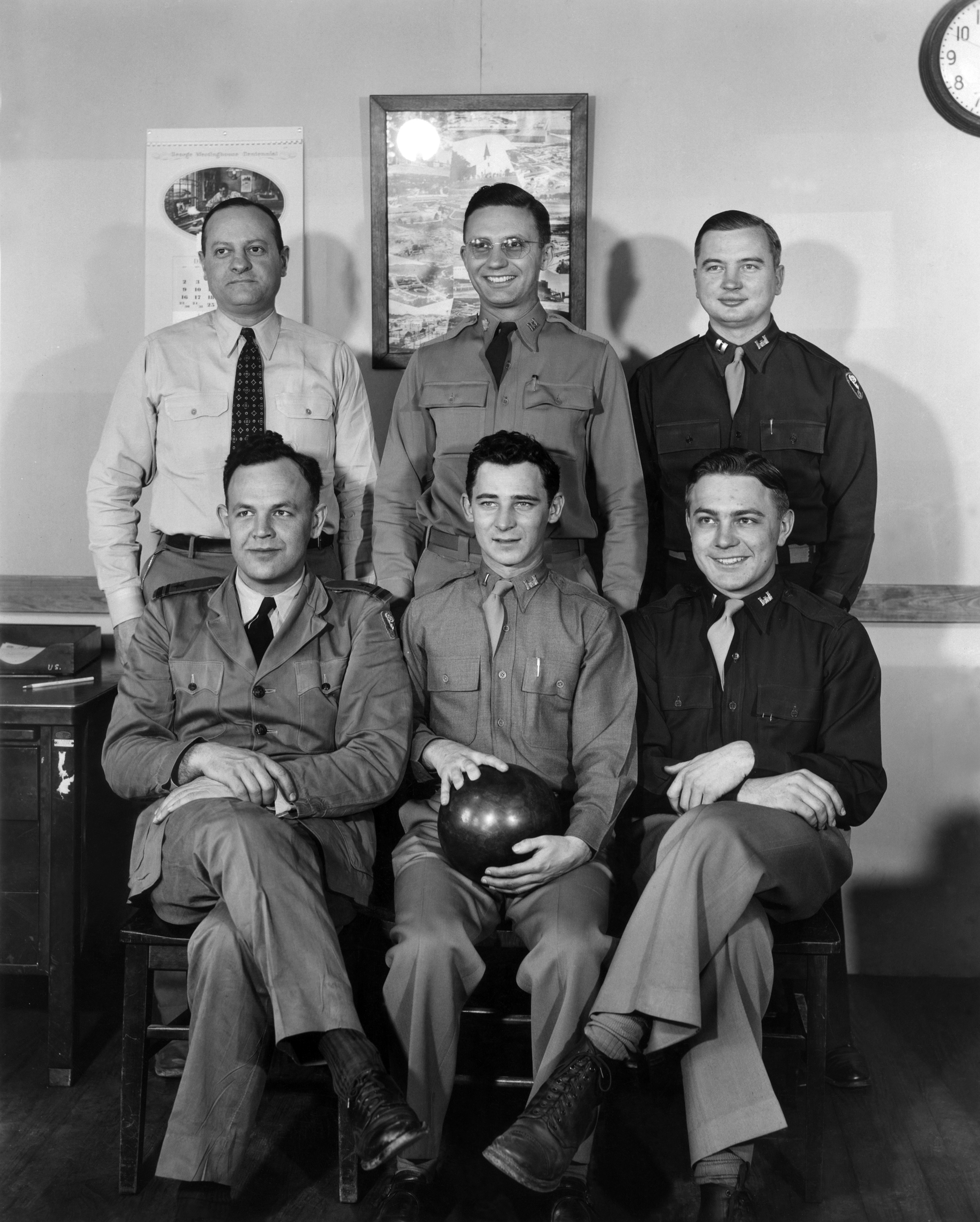
The bowling team at Oak Ridge National Laboratory in 1944

Since the advent of Ten-pin bowling, there have been many bowlers who have achieved fame for their excellence in the sport. These bowlers have led to changes in game mechanics, new high scores, and increased interest in the game. The vast majority of these bowlers are professionals who have competed in national and international tournaments.

== Living ==
=== Active ===
==== Australia ====
- Jason Belmonte

==== Brazil ====
- Oscar Marin (bowler)

==== Canada ====
- Graham Fach
- François Lavoie

==== Colombia ====
- Clara Guerrero
- Rocio Restrepo

==== Denmark ====
- Mai Ginge Jensen

==== Dominican Republic ====
- Aumi Guerra

==== England ====
- Verity Crawley
- Dominic Barrett
- Zara Glover
- Nikki Harvey
- Paul Moor
- Kirsten Penny
- Stuart Williams

==== Finland ====
- Mika Koivuniemi
- Osku Palermaa

==== Germany ====
- Jens Nickel
- Achim Grabowski

==== Hungary ====
- Beatrix Pesek

==== India ====
- Shaik Abdul Hameed
- Shabbir Dhankot
- Sabeena Saleem

==== Japan ====
- Yūki Akiyoshi
- Nachimi Itakura
- Aino Kinjo
- Hiromi Matsunaga
- Ritsuko Nakayama
- Aki Nawa
- Miki Nishimura
- Mika Sakai
- Hiroko Shimizu
- Akiko Tanigawa

==== Malaysia ====
- Adrian Ang
- Shalin Zulkifli
- Muhammad Rafiq Ismail

==== Mexico ====
- Miriam Zetter (born 1989)

==== Norway ====
- Tore Torgersen

==== Pakistan ====
- Ijaz Ur Rehman

==== Philippines ====
- Olivia "Bong" Coo
- Rafael Nepomuceno
- Arianne Cerdeña
- Liza del Rosario

==== Singapore ====
- Remy Ong
- Jazreel Tan

==== Sweden ====
- Nina Flack
- Helén Johnsson
- Jesper Svensson

==== United States ====
- Patrick Allen
- Diandra Asbaty
- Tom Baker
- Chris Barnes
- Lynda Barnes
- Leanne Barrette
- Mookie Betts
- Devin Bidwell
- Parker Bohn III
- DeeRonn Booker
- John Burkett
- Jakob Butturff
- Ryan Ciminelli
- Jason Couch
- Carolyn Dorin-Ballard
- Kamron Doyle
- Norm Duke
- Mike Fagan
- Gary Faulkner Jr.
- Bryan Goebel
- Michael Haugen Jr.
- Tom Hess
- Liz Johnson
- Tommy Jones
- Marshall Kent
- Kelly Kulick
- Chris Loschetter
- Tim Mack
- Shawn Maldonado
- Wes Malott
- Danielle McEwan
- Bill O'Neill
- Rhino Page
- Randy Pedersen
- Johnny Petraglia
- Shannon Pluhowsky
- Kristopher Prather
- Sean Rash
- Mike Scroggins
- Anthony Simonsen
- Tom Smallwood
- Robert Smith
- E. J. Tackett
- William V. Thompson
- Kyle Troup
- Andy Varipapa
- Wayne Webb
- Pete Weber
- Walter Ray Williams Jr.

==== Venezuela ====
- Karen Marcano
- Amleto Monacelli

=== Retired ===
==== Canada ====
- Michael Schmidt

==== Hong Kong ====
- Melody Yeung

==== Sweden ====
- Mats Karlsson
- Tomas Leandersson

==== United States ====
- Kim Adler
- Mike Aulby
- Del Ballard Jr.
- Bob Benoit
- George Branham III
- Nelson (Bo) Burton Jr.
- Jeff Carter
- Steve Cook
- Dave Davis
- Mike Durbin
- Patrick Healey Jr.
- Marshall Holman
- Dave Husted
- Doug Kent
- John Mazza
- Billy Oatman
- David Ozio
- George Pappas
- Mark Roth
- Carmen Salvino
- Jess Stayrook
- Guppy Troup
- Danny Wiseman

== Deceased ==
=== United States ===
- Earl Anthony
- Don Carter
- Buzz Fazio
- Billy Hardwick
- Don Johnson
- John Jowdy
- Andy Varipapa
- Dick Weber
- Billy Welu
- Mark Roth
