= Bowling Revolution P-League =

- Japanese: ボウリング革命 P★League
- Presented by: Play-by-play; Mitsuaki Ogawa, Ryo Izuno, Daisuke Fujita; Reporters; Marie Ueda; Color analysts Takashi Maruyama, Yoshimi Kitaoka, Kinta Yano; Supporter; Saki Nakajima
- No. of series: 59

Production
- Production company: NTV

Original release
- Network: BS NTV
- Release: April 2, 2006

Bowling Revolution P★League (ボウリング革命 P★League, Bōringu Kakumei Pi-ri-gu) is a series of Japanese women-only bowling tournaments, developed solely for television. Entry into these tournaments is limited to selected members of the Japan Professional Bowling Association (JPBA), and amateurs who have qualified via open auditions. The show airs throughout Japan on BS NTV.

The "P" in P★League has five meanings: "Pretty", "Power", "Passion", "Performance" and "Perfect".

== History ==
During the 1970s, bowling was very popular among the Japanese. Japan had as many as 3,697 bowling establishments during the 1970s, with more than 120,000 bowling lanes installed.

By the late 1990s, the number had shrunk to only 600. In 2008, there were 1,100 bowling establishments and 25.1 million people bowled in Japan: about one in five Japanese.

In the 1970s, the JPBA produced a series of televised bowling tournaments, such as Ladies Challenge Bowl (レディズ・チャレンジボウル 1969–1975) and The Star Bowling (ザ・スターボウリング 1978–1998), in the attempt to further push the sport's appeal, as well as showcase the women who competed in the JPBA. Big names such as Ritsuko Nakayama and Kayoko Suda competed in these tournaments. The formula worked - as the show's concept is used in many other Japanese bowling promotions on television, leading up to the present day.

Nakayama, along with the JPBA, created P-League in 2006 in an attempt to revive bowling's popularity on television once enjoyed in the 1970s.

=== Broadcast history ===
The P-League's television show premiered on BS NTV on April 2, 2006, initially airing on Sunday nights at 7:30 p.m. JST. After Tournament 18 ended on March 29, 2009, the show was moved to the 5:30 p.m. timeslot beginning April 5, where it remained until the final episode of Tournament 36 aired on March 25, 2012. The show was then moved to Friday nights at 10:30 p.m., and it began airing in that time slot on April 6. On October 4, 2013, the show was moved one hour later to 11:30 p.m. After two years in that timeslot, the show was moved to 10:00 p.m. on October 4, 2015, where it remains to this day.

== Participants ==
The women who compete in P-League have either been chosen by the JPBA, or qualified through a try-out. The bowlers who compete in P-League are among the best women bowlers in the world. Most of the competitors hold an average of 190 or better, and several have bowled 300 games and 800 series.

== Tournament details ==
The television show consists of a series of tournament matches. An entire tournament is bowled and filmed in one day. However, when aired on television, the television coverage can span nine weeks because of the 30-minute time slot. Each tournament is bowled in a single-elimination bracket format.

=== Current format ===
Tournaments 14 and later

The current format consists of a field of eighteen bowlers, being six groups of three bowlers (A through F) filled by lottery. In Round 1, the highest scorer in each group advances to a semi-final ABC or DEF match. The highest scorer in each ABC/DEF match advances to the finals. To keep the three-bowler format in the finals, the bowler who had the highest score among the remaining four bowlers from the ABC/DEF matches also bowls in the finals as the "wild card". The winner of the final match is the champion, with the remaining bowlers getting second and third place based on score.

Starting with Tournament 20, bowlers with a lower score in the first round may be banned from the following tournament.

Starting with Tournament 35, only members of the JPBA are allowed to participate. Members of the Japan Bowling Congress (JBC) and its National Team were allowed to compete in Tournaments 2 through 34.

Starting with Tournament 43, P-League is now grouping three consecutive tournaments (43, 44, 45) as a season, with a season-ending, three-bowler final match to be held after the third tournament's final match.

Tie-breaking processes

- If bowlers tie in a match, a one-ball roll-off is used to decide the winner. The highest scorer of the roll-off wins the match. If the bowlers remain tied, the process repeats until there is a winner. (This process is also used when the lowest score in a first round match is a tie. The loser of the tie-breaker will be banned from the next tournament. See the "Banned" section.)
- If two bowlers are tied in the running for the Wild Card entry, the entry is given to the bowler who had the higher game score in the last non-tied frame. This is also called the "countback method".
- If bowlers are tied in the season-opening qualifying round, ties will broken by number of strikes, then by when the earliest strike occurred, then by a roll-off.

Tournament bracket

First round
A1
A2
A3
B1
B2
B3
C1
C2
C3
D1
D2
D3
E1
E2
E3
F1
F2
F3

Semifinals
Winner of Match A
Winner of Match B
Winner of Match C
Winner of Match D
Winner of Match E
Winner of Match F

Final
Winner of ABC semifinal
Highest scoring non-winner in semifinals
Winner of DEF semifinal

=== Seasons ===
Starting with T43, P-League has implemented a seasonal system in conjunction with its regular tournament system. The seasons are designed to be in-line with the Japanese television seasons, which traditionally are broken into four three-month periods (winter, spring, summer, and autumn.) The first season, called S1 from hereon will group T43, T44 and T45 together.

In the first tournament of each season, 24 current P-League members will participate in a six-ball roll-off. The top 18 bowlers will bowl in the first tournament. The low six bowlers will be cut from the tournament, and will be used later on as fillers for the second tournament after the six low scorers are banned. The banned bowlers will then return for the third tournament of the season to fill in for the banned bowlers from the second tournament.

In addition, a point system has been created, starting with S1. The points are broken down as such:

- In the A-F matches, the winner will receive 3 points, the second high score will receive 1 point, and the lowest score will receive zero points, as well as a ban from the following* tournament.
- In the ABC and DEF matches, the winner will receive 3 points, the second high score will receive 1 point, and the low score will receive zero points.
- In the final match, the tournament champion will receive 5 points, the second high score will receive 3 points, and the low score will receive 1 point.

* In the third tournament of a season, a lowest score will not be banned for the next tournament due to the start of a new season.

The points during the three tournaments of a season are added up, and the top three scorers will bowl in a season-ending championship. The winner of the match will be crowned "Season Queen."

Prize Money

All prize money is paid to the bowlers in Japanese yen (¥). Prize money is currently: 1st Place - ¥300,000. Second and third place are no longer paid due to the new seasonal setup. In the seasonal final: "Season Queen" - ¥1,000,000 (100万円), 2nd Place - ¥300,000 (30万円) and 3rd Place - ¥100,000 (10万円).

Perfect Prize

Starting with Tournament 35, the prize money is ¥3.0 million (300万円), regardless of when the 300 game is rolled.

==== Previous formats ====
Tournament 1

Twelve bowlers competed. Four of the bowlers had an automatic berth to Round 2. In Round 1, the eight remaining bowlers competed in four head-to-head matches, with the winner in each match moving up to the Round 2. The winners of the four head-to-head matches in Round 2 moved up to the semi-final round. The two winners of the semi-finals moved up to the final match, while the two losers moved into the consolation match. The winner of the final match placed first, while the loser placed second, and the winner of the consolation match placed third.

Tournament 2

The field was changed from twelve to sixteen, consisting of two groups (A and B) of eight bowlers. In Round 1, each group competed in four head-to-head matches, with the winners moving up to Round 2. The two groups of two Round 2 match winners moved up to the semi-final round. The two winners of the semi-finals moved up to the final match, while the two losers moved into the consolation match. The winner of the final match placed first, while the loser placed second, and the winner of the consolation match placed third.

Tournament 3

The field was reduced to fourteen bowlers, being two groups (A and B) of seven bowlers, with one bowler in each group given a bye into Round 2, while the remaining six bowlers in each group competed in three head-to-head matches, with those winners moving on to Round 2. The two groups of two Round 2 match winners moved up to the semi-final round. The two winners of the semi-finals moved up to the final match, while the two losers moved into the consolation match. The winner of the final match placed first, while the loser placed second, and the winner of the consolation match placed third.

Tournaments 4 through 12

The field was again increased to sixteen bowlers. Four groups (A through D) of four bowlers were created. In Round 1, the two highest scorers in each group advanced to Round 2. In Round 2, two groups (AB and CD) were created, and the two highest scorers in each group advanced to the semi-final round. The four remaining bowlers are split into two head-to-head matches, with the winners advancing to the final match, while the two losers moved to the consolation match. The winner of the final match placed first, while the loser placed second, and the winner of the consolation match placed third.

Tournament 13

In Tournament 13, the field was re-sized to fifteen bowlers. Five groups of three bowlers (A through E) were created. In Round 1, the highest scorer in each group advanced to the semi-finals. In the semi-finals, the five winners were split into two matches of three. For the sixth bowler, a wild card bowler was determined by the bowler who had the highest score among the losers in Round 1. The two highest scorers in each match moved up to the final match. The 1st through 4th places were determined by the order of the scores.

== Venue and filming conditions ==
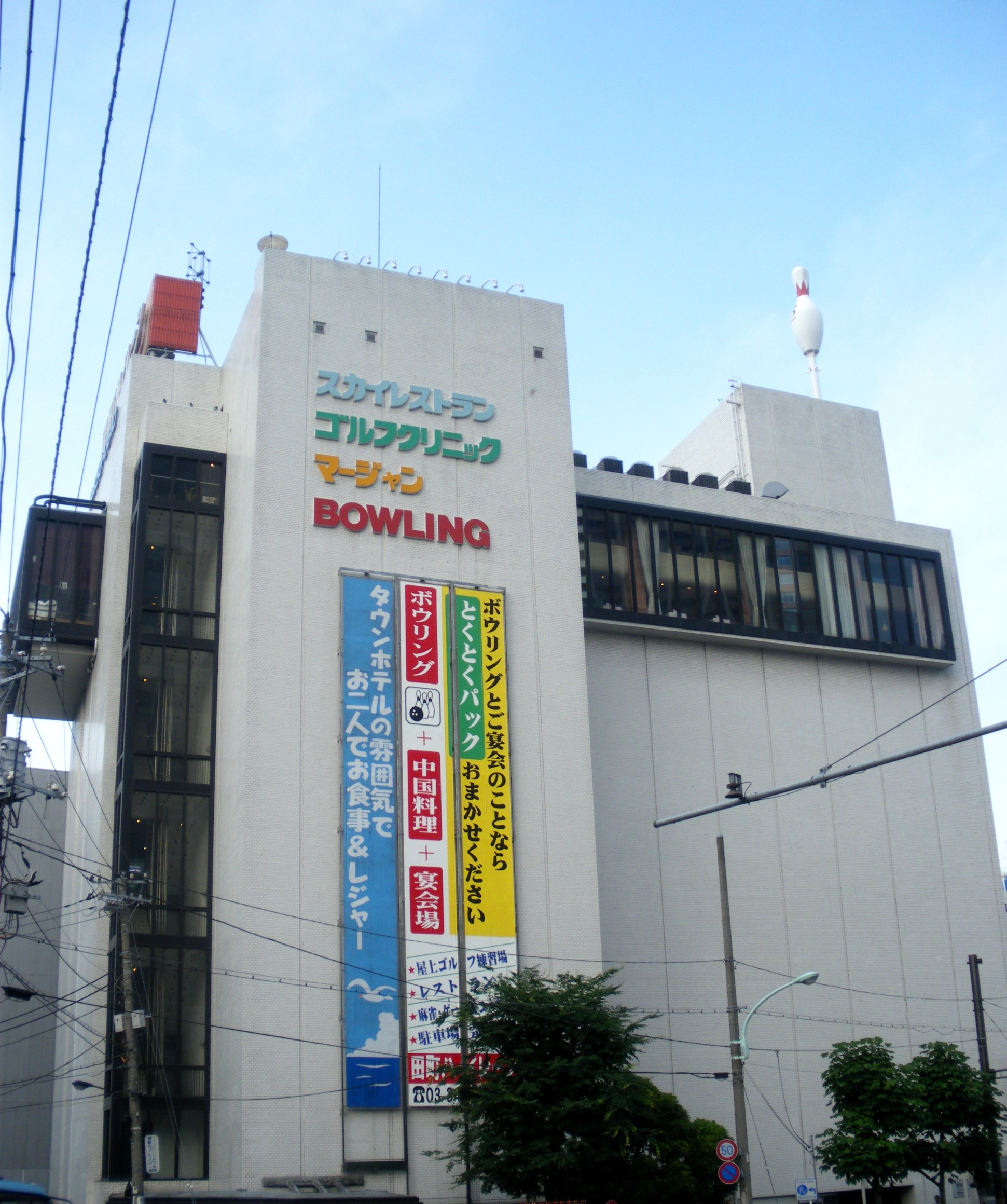
Tamachi Hilane (田町ハイレーン), located in Minato-ku, Tokyo

Currently, all the tournaments are filmed at the 68-lane Tamachi Hilane (田町ハイレーン) bowling center, located in Minato City, Tokyo, with the exception of T44, which was filmed at Tomikoshi Takashimadaira Bowl, located in Itabashi, Tokyo.

A temporary filming studio enclosure is constructed around three pairs of lanes (lanes 57 through 62 at Tamachi, and 27 through 32 at Tomikoshi), complete with additional lighting and a pink-themed decor. On the outer pairs of lanes, the first half of those lanes past the foul line is turned into seating areas for the live viewing audience, which can number over one hundred spectators. Lanes 59 and 60 at Tamachi (29 and 30 at Tomikoshi) are bowled on as the tournament "TV pair." As of T43, P-League features a new larger digital scoreboard above the far end of the pair. Many other parts of the establishment are turned into dressing rooms and interviewing areas.

While the matches are being filmed, most of the remaining competitors sit in the "settee area" to the left of the tournament pair, along with the viewing audience, watch the matches. In earlier tournaments, when a member of the Japan National Team bowled, her JNT teammates in the settee area would yell "saa iccho" (さーいっちょ) for encouragement just before the bowler made her delivery. The television commentators are situated in the settee area to the right of the tournament pair. Usually, the commentators cannot be heard by the people in the studio during the match. But, on occasion a commentator will yell with enthusiasm, stirring up laughter among the bowlers. Ryo Itsuno once yelled, "Nandedayō?" (何でだよう？ or "Why?") while working on Round 25, Match E when Yūko Nakatani left a soft 10-pin in a crucial must-strike situation. Other phrases popular with Itsuno include "YOSHA! SUTORAIKŪ!" (よっしゃぁ～!ストラッイクー!) or "JUST POCKET!" (ジャストポケット!) after a strike, and "GOOD JOB!" or "EXCELLENT!" after a great spare conversion.

The scores are tracked by the computer scoring system on the TV pair, and occasionally need to be corrected by the bowlers themselves.

Competitors in the upcoming matches practice outside of the studio, using the remaining available lanes.

At the end of most telecasts, supporter Saki Nakajima hosts a segment called Chotto Kininaru! or I'm Curious! (ちょっと 気になる！) where she meets with the members of P-League, and together participate in various activities, such as interviews, bowling tips, and skill challenges.

== Cast ==
=== Active bowlers (T1 to T33) ===
Key to table:

- ☆ - Champion, ◎ - 2nd Place, △ - 3rd Place, □ - 4th Place (T1-13).
- 2 - Eliminated in semi-finals ("ABC"/"DEF" matches in T14-current; "2nd Round" in T1-13).
- 1 - Eliminated in 1st Round (any A-F match).
- ▼ - Lowest score in a single A-F match (T31-41, T43- ) or lowest score(s) in all A-F matches (T20-30).
- "Blank" - Did not compete.
- × - Banned (after previous "▼"; T21-42, T44- ).
- ● - Non-qualifier in six-ball roll-off (start of each "season": T43- )

JPBA Professionals
Name	1	2	3	4	5	6	7	8	9	10	11	12	13	14	15	16	17	18	19	20	21	22	23	24	25	26	27	28	29	30	31	32	33
Aki Nawa (名和秋)	2	☆	◎	1	2	△	1	1	△	2	2	2	◎	1	2	1	1	1	1	▼	×	2	1	1	1	2	1	1	▼	×	△	1	▼
Aki Suzuki (鈴木亜季)																																△	1
Akiko Tanigawa (谷川章子)	1	2	1	2	1	1	1	2	1	☆	2	1	1	1	1	1	1	1	2	1	1	◎	◎	1	1	1	2	2	1	2	▼	×	1
Ayano Katai (ja:片井文乃)		△	1	□	2	1	1	1	2	△	1	◎	1	◎	1	1		1	1	1	▼	×	2	☆		2	◎	1	▼	×	▼	×	△
Ayano Katai (ja:片井文乃)		T2 thru 24: Japan National Team																								JPBA member
Hiromi Matsunaga (松永裕美)								□	◎	◎	1	1	1	2			△	☆	☆	2	☆	2	1	2	△	1	1	1	☆	☆	☆	☆	1
Masami Hasegawa (長谷川真実)			□		1									2	1	2	1	2	1	1	1	1	2	2	2	1	1	▼	×	▼	2	▼	×
Masami Satō (佐藤まさみ)																						☆	2	1	▼	×	△	1	2	1	1	▼	×
Mayumi Yoshida (吉田真由美)	☆	2	2	1	1	2	◎	△							1	◎	1	1	2	◎	1	1	1	◎	☆	2	1	1	1	▼	×	◎	1
Mika Sakai (酒井美佳)	2	1	2	1	1	1	△	2	2	1	◎	1	1	1	2	2	2	1	1	1	2	1	1	▼	×	◎	▼	×	▼	×	1	1	1
Name	1	2	3	4	5	6	7	8	9	10	11	12	13	14	15	16	17	18	19	20	21	22	23	24	25	26	27	28	29	30	31	32	33
Miki Nishimura (西村美紀)														1	1	1	1	1	△	2	1	1	▼	×	1	☆	1	1	△	◎	1	1	◎
Mitsuki Nakamura (中村美月)																					▼	×	1	2	1	1	1	▼	×	1	▼	×	▼
Nao Ōishi (大石奈緒)											2	☆	1	☆	△	☆	◎	1	1	2	◎	1	▼	×	1	△	1	◎	1	1	▼	×	2
Nao Ōishi (大石奈緒)											T11 thru 34: Japan National Team
Natsumi Koizumi (小泉奈津美)																			1		2	1	1	△	▼	×	1	2	×	2	1	2	▼
Natsumi Koizumi (小泉奈津美)																			T19 thru 30: Japan National Team												Amateur
Risa Suzuki (鈴木理沙)														1	1	1	1	1	1	▼	×	1	1	1	2	1	▼	×	1	2	1	▼	×
Sanae Mori (森彩奈江)			1					2	1	1	1	△	2	△	1	1	2	1	1	1	△	▼	×	1	◎	1	1	2	◎	△	2	1	2
Sanae Mori (森彩奈江)	T3: amateur							JPBA member
Suzuna Miyagi (宮城鈴菜)		1	1	1	1	◎	2	1	1	2	1	1	1	1	1	1	1	2		1	2								1	▼	×	1	1
Suzuna Miyagi (宮城鈴菜)		T2 thru 18: Japan National Team																		JPBA member
Urara Himeji (姫路麗)	2	1	2	☆	◎	1	☆	◎	1	1	△	1	☆	1	1	△	☆	2	1	1	1	1	△	1	1	1	☆	1	1	1	▼	×	☆
Yūka Kishida (岸田有加)																										▼	×	1	1	1	2	2	▼
Name	1	2	3	4	5	6	7	8	9	10	11	12	13	14	15	16	17	18	19	20	21	22	23	24	25	26	27	28	29	30	31	32	33

=== Active bowlers (T43 to present) ===
Key to table:

- ☆ - Champion, ◎ - 2nd Place, △ - 3rd Place
- SF - Eliminated in semi-finals ("ABC"/"DEF" matches)
- 1 - Eliminated in 1st Round (any A-F match)
- ↓ - Lowest score in a single A-F match (T31-present; starting with T42, lowest score does not matter in "season tournament 3" - see "Non-qualifier" below)
- "Blank" - Inactive
- × - Banned (after previous "↓"; T21-present. Starting with T43, bowlers can only be banned for season tournaments 2 and 3, see next entry)
- ● - Non-qualifier in six-ball roll-off ("Season Tournament 1"; T43 and every third tournament thereafter)
- A - Amateur

Name	Catchphrase	S1			S2			S3			S4			S5			S6			S7			S8			S9			S10			S11			S12			S13			Total wins
Name	Catchphrase	43	44	45	46	47	48	49	50	51	52	53	54	55	56	57	58	59	60	61	62	63	64	65	66	67	68	69	70	71	72	73	74	75	76	77	78	79	80	81	Total wins
Rina Asada (浅田梨奈)	Angel Smile	×	×	×	×	×	×	×	×	×	×	×	×	×	×	×	1	↓	×	↓	×	1	×	×	×	●	1	1	△	1	1	×	×	×	×	×	×	●	Inactive		0
Hitomi Anadō (安藤瞳)	Cutie Eyes	●	○	SF	SF	○	1	SF	↓	×	●	↓	×	●	↓	×	1	SF	1	◎	↓	×	1	1	◎	●	◎	1	↓	×	1	1	1	1	1	↓	×	↓	×	Inactive	0
Ayano Iwami (岩見彩乃)	Unconventional Back-Upper	×	×	×	↓	×	1	×	×	×	×	×	×	×	×	×	↓	×	1	●	↓	×	↓	×	1	↓	×	☆	SF	◎	SF	△	↓	×	●	↓	×	↓	×	Inactive	1
Asami Uta (浦麻紗実)	Dynamite Hammy	Not a JPBA member												●	1	1	×	×	×	×	×	×	×	×	×	×	×	×	×	×	×	×	×	×	×	×	×	×	×	×	0
Mina Endō (遠藤未菜)	Sports Club Powerful Lady	×	×	×	☆	↓	×	×	×	×	↓	×	1	●	SF	1	↓	×	SF	SF	1	1	↓	×	SF	↓	×	1	1	1	△	1	↓	×	×	×	×	×	×	×	1
Nao Ōishi(大石奈緒)	Northern Superheroine	●	↓	×	↓	×	1	◎	1	◎	●	☆	1	↓	×	SF	●	1	1	1	1	△	☆	1	SF	●	1	1	↓	×	1	1	△	1	↓	×	△	↓	×	Inactive	2
Yuka Ōshima (大嶋有香)	Whimsy! Venus	Not a JPBA member																					1	↓	×	●	↓	×	1	☆	1	1	1	1	×	×	×	↓	×	N/A	1
Junya Onaka (大仲純玲)	Lane Kuno	Not a JPBA member																																	＊	↓	×	Inactive			0
Yuki Okada (岡田友貴)	High Spec Girl	Not a JPBA member																																	↓	×	1	↓	×	Ret	0
Ayano Katai (片井文乃)	Flame Challenger	×	×	×	×	×	×	×	×	×	×	×	×	×	×	×	×	×	×	×	×	×	×	×	×	×	×	×	×	×	×	×	×	×	×	×	×	×	×	×	0
Yui Kawasaki (川崎由意)	Kawayui Football	Not a JPBA member																		1	1	1	●	◎	1	●	SF	SF	SF	1	1	●	↓	×	SF	SF	SF	1	Inactive		0
Yuka Kishida (岸田有加)	Passionate Ponytail	↓	×	1	↓	×	SF	●	1	SF	×	×	×	×	×	×	×	×	×	×	×	×	×	×	×	×	×	×	×	×	×	×	×	×	×	×	×	×	×	×	0
(South Korea) Kim Seul-ki (キム・スルギ)	Fightin'! K-Girl	1	1	1	●	☆	1	↓	×	1	↓	×	◎	1	↓	×	1	↓	×	●	◎	SF	↓	×	1	↓	×	◎	●	SF	☆	↓	×	◎	1	↓	×	Inactive			2
Ayaka Kubota (久保田彩花)	Wonder Girl of Nara	Not a JPBA member																														SF	SF	1	●	1	1	●	Inactive		0
Miwa Kumamoto (熊本美和)	Real Idol of the Bowling World	Not a JPBA member																																	↓	×	1	×	×	×	0
Saki Koike (小池沙紀)	Positive Daughter From Nagasaki	Not a JPBA member																					＊	○	1	☆	☆	1	↓	×	1	1	↓	×	↓	×	1	Inactive			2
Natsumi Koizawa (小泉奈津美)	Counterattack Babyface	×	×	×	∆	A	×	•	SF	1	1	↓	×	•	1	1	◎	◎	☆	☆	1	SF	SF	1	☆	•	1	1	•	SF	1	↓	×	1	SF	〇	1	1	Inactive		1
Ayumi Kobayashi (小林あゆみ)	Brilliant Left-Armer	1	◎	1	×	×	×	×	×	×	×	×	×	1	1	☆	1	↓	×	1	↓	×	↓	×	1	◎	↓	×	1	↓	×	•	◎	SF	•	◎	1	Inactive			1
Yoshimi Kobayashi (小林よしみ)	Cool Matchmaker!	·	SF	1	×	×	×	SF	1	1	×	×	×	SF	∆	SF	•	1	◎	○	SF	1	•	SF	1	1	1	SF	•	SF	SF	SF	SF	SF	•	1	1	×	×	×	0
Mika Sakai (酒井美佳)	Supermodel of the Lane	∆	↓	×	1	↓	×	•	↓	×	•	SF	SF	∆	↓	×	☆	1	1	•	↓	×	SF	1	1	SF	↓	×	SF	1	1	↓	×	1	↓	×	1	1	Inactive		1
Shiori Sakomoto (坂本詩緒里)	Prima Bowler from Russia	Not a JPBA member															•	SF	1	↓	×	☆	◎	↓	×	↓	×	1	↓	×	1	↓	×	1	∆	↓	×	↓	×	Inactive	1
Asami Sakurai (櫻井麻美)	Shonan's Gorgeous Bowler	Not a JPBA member			•	1	1	1	SF	1	×	×	×	↓	×	1	×	×	×	×	×	×	×	×	×	×	×	×	×	×	×	×	×	×	×	×	×	×	×	×	0
Moriko Sakurai (櫻井眞利子)	Good Feeling Venus Strike	SF	↓	×	•	1	1	•	1	SF	☆	SF	SF	↓	×	1	•	1	SF	•	1	1	•	↓	×	1	1	1	×	×	×	•	1	1	1	↓	×	•	Inactive		1
Masami Satō (佐藤まさみ)	天真爛漫FUJIYAMAガール	↓	×	1	卒
Kana Shimoide (霜出佳奈)	新生キラキラボウラー	×	×	×	×	×	×	×	×	×	×	×	×	×	×	×	×	×	×	×	×	×	×	×	×	×	×	×	1	↓	×	＊	↓	＊	×	×	×	×	×	×	第70戦よりPリーグ復帰／2017年プロテスト合格
Aki Suzuki (鈴木亜季)	東海のファンキーガール	↓	×	○	＊	準	○	準	1	1	準	1	○	1	準	1	＊	↓	×	↓	×	1	×	×	×	↓	×	○	◎	○	◎	↓	×	〇	1	準	1	×	×	×
Risa Suzuki (鈴木理沙)	リトル★ファンタジスタ	1	1	準	1	↓	×	＊	1	1	×	×	×	×	×	×	1	1	1	×	×	×	×	×	×	1	↓	×	×	×	×	×	×	×	×	×	×	1
Miki Takehara (竹原三貴)	神戸のハッピーボウラー	＊	1	1	1	↓	×	↓	×	1	×	×	×	↓	×	1	×	×	×	×	×	×	×	×	×	×	×	×	×	×	×	×	×	×	×	×	×	×	×	×
Ami Tanaka (田中亜実)	天然!ビタミン娘	×	×	×	×	×	×	1	↓	×	↓	×	1	×	×	×	×	×	×	×	×	×	×	×	×	×	×	×	×	×	×	×	×	×	×	×	×	×	×	×
Akiko Tanigawa (谷川章子)	ビューティー・ハニー	1	1	1	↓	×	準	↓	×	1	＊	1	1	×	×	×	×	×	×	×	×	×	×	×	×	×	×	×	×	×	×	×	×	×	×	×	×	×	×	×
Anami Tsurui(鶴井阿南)	フレッシュサウスポー										1	↓	×	準	1	1	準	↓	×	準	準	◎	1	☆	○	準	準	1	＊	1	1	＊	準	準	◎	1	準	1			第2回次世代P★リーガー発掘プロジェクト合格者; 2014年プロテスト合格／第4シーズンよりPリーグ参加
Chika Terashita(寺下智香)	道産子アスリート										○	↓	×	1	◎	○	↓	×	1	1	1	1	○	↓	×	準	↓	×	↓	×	準	☆	1	☆	準	1	☆	＊			第2回次世代P★リーガー発掘プロジェクト合格者; 2014年プロテスト合格／第4シーズンよりPリーグ参加
Mariko Nakano (中野麻理子)	九州魂全開レフティ										↓	×	1	×	×	×	×	×	×	×	×	×	×	×	×	×	×	×	×	×	×	×	×	×	×	×	×	×	×	×	第4シーズンよりPリーグ参加／2012年プロテスト合格
Mitsuki Nakamura (中村美月)	下町の鉄腕ルーキー	↓	×	準	1	1	1	↓	×	1	＊	1	1	×	×	×	↓	×	1	×	×	×	×	×	×	×	×	×	×	×	×	×	×	×	×	×	×	×	×	×
Aki Nawa(名和秋)	サイレント・ビューティー	↓	×	1	準	1	1	＊	☆	○	1	1	準	1	1	1	○	1	1	1	↓	×	＊	1	準	1	↓	×	1	1	1	1	↓	×	1	1	1
Miki Nishimura (西村美紀)	浪速のダイナミックボンバー	◎	準	1	1	◎	◎	準	1	◎	1	1	◎	1	準	1	↓	×	○	1	☆	1	準	欠	×	卒
Masami Hasegawa (長谷川真実)	マシュマロ・スマイル	1	↓	×	準	1	1	×	×	×	×	×	×	×	×	×	×	×	×	×	×	×	×	×	×	1	○	1	×	×	×	×	×	×	×	×	×	×	×	×
Urara Himeji (姫路麗)	気迫のボウリング・ジェンヌ	準	1	1	1	準	☆	1	○	1	準	○	1	◎	☆	1	1	↓	×	準	↓	×	1	準	1	1	準	1	1	↓	×	◎	☆	欠	＊	準	1	×	×	×
Mai Funamoto (舟本舞)	四国のボウリングマイスター	準	↓	×	×	×	×	↓	×	1	×	×	×	×	×	×	×	×	×	×	×	×	×	×	×	×	×	×	×	×	×	×	×	×	×	×	×	×	×	×	第43戦よりPリーグ参加
Shoko Furuta (古田翔子)	発展途上!ひまわり娘				＊	↓	×	○	↓	×	1	↓	×	↓	×	1	×	×	×	×	×	×	1	準	1	×	×	×	×	×	×	×	×	×	×	×	×	×	×	×	第2シーズンよりPリーグ参加／2013年プロテスト合格
Narumi Honma (本間成美)	アプローチのアイドル										1	↓	×	1	↓	×	×	×	×	×	×	×	↓	×	1	×	×	×	×	×	×	×	×	×	×	×	×	×	×	×	第4シーズンよりPリーグ参加／2014年プロテスト合格
Rumi Maeya (前屋瑠美)	不屈のリトルファイター										◎	1	1	×	×	×	×	×	×	×	×	×	×	×	×	×	×	×	×	×	×	×	×	×	×	×	×	×	×	×	第2回次世代P★リーガー発掘プロジェクト合格者; 2014年プロテスト合格／第4シーズンよりPリーグ参加
Hiromi Matsunga(松永裕美)	博多のミラクルファイター	＊	1	1	↓	×	準	☆	↓	×	＊	準	☆	↓	×	◎	準	☆	1	↓	×	1	＊	1	1	○	1	1	↓	×	1	準	1	1	1	1	◎
Suzuna Miyagi(宮城鈴菜)	驚異のクランカー	↓	×	1	卒
Sanae Mori (森彩奈江)	シンデレラガール	☆	準	◎	◎	1	1	↓	×	☆	↓	×	1	☆	1	準	↓	×	1	↓	×	準	1	↓	×	↓	×	準	＊	↓	×	↓	×	1	☆	☆	1	1
Yuki Yamada (山田幸)	新世代のカリスマ																			＊	準	1	↓	×	欠	×	×	×	☆	↓	×	＊	1	1	↓	×	1	↓	×		2015年プロテスト合格／第7シーズンよりPリーグ参加
Mayumi Yoshida (吉田真由美)	ボウリング・アーティスト	＊	☆	☆	↓	×	1	1	準	準	＊	1	1	＊	↓	×	準	○	準	＊	○	1	×	×	×	×	×	×	×	×	×	×	×	×	×	×	×	×	×	×
Keaki Watanabe (渡辺けあき)	アクトレス・ストライカー	1	↓	×	＊	準	1	1	↓	×	↓	×	1	＊	↓	×	＊	準	1	↓	×	1	×	×	×	×	×	×	＊	↓	×	×	×	×	×	×	×	×	×	×	第39戦よりPリーグ参加／2012年プロテスト合格

=== Tournaments 34–42 ===
Not in season format

JPBA Professionals
										Season 1				Season 2
Name	34	35	36	37	38	39	40	41	42	43	44	45	F1	46	47	48	F2
Aki Nawa (名和秋)	×	2	1	1	1	1	1	1	◎	▼	×	1		2	?	?	?
Aki Suzuki (鈴木亜季)	1	2	△	△	1	▼	×	☆	1	▼	×	△		●	?	?	?
Akiko Tanigawa (谷川章子)	▼	×	1	1	▼	×	▼	×	1	1	1	1		▼	×	?	?
Ami Tanaka (田中亜実)		1	▼	×		▼	×
Asami Sakurai (櫻井麻美)														●	?	?	?
Ayumi Kobayashi (小林あゆみ)	1	☆	1	▼	×	△	2	▼	×	1	◎	1
Hiromi Matsunaga (松永裕美)	1	△	2	☆	2	☆	1	1	2	●	1	1		▼	×	?	?
Hitomi Andō (安藤瞳)			1	▼	×	2	▼	×	1	●	△	2		2	?	?	?
Hitomi Andō (安藤瞳)			1st audition winner
Keaki Watanabe (渡辺けあき)						▼	×	1	1	1	▼	×		●	?	?	?
Mai Funamoto (舟本舞)										2	▼	x
Mariko Sakurai (櫻井眞利子)								▼	×	2	▼	x		●	?	?	?
Masami Hasegawa (長谷川真実)	△	▼	×	2	1	1	1	2	1	1	▼	x		2	?	?	?
Masami Satō (佐藤まさみ)		▼	×							▼	×	1
Mayumi Yoshida (吉田真由美)	☆	1	◎	▼	×		2	▼	×	●	☆	☆	☆	▼	×	?	?
Mika Sakai (酒井美佳)	◎	▼	×	1	△	1	▼	×	1	△	▼	x		1	?	?	?
Name	34	35	36	37	38	39	40	41	42	43	44	45	F1	46	47	48	F2
Miki Nishimura (西村美紀)	2	◎	☆	◎	☆	2	1	△	1	◎	2	1	△	1	?	?	?
Miki Takehara (竹原三貴)		1	▼	×	1	1	◎	1	1	●	1	1		1	?	?	?
Mitsuki Nakamura (中村美月)	×	1	1	2	◎	▼	×	▼	×	▼	×	2		1	?	?	?
Nao Ōishi (大石奈緒)	1				1	◎	1	2	2	●	▼	x		▼	x	?	?
Nao Ōishi (大石奈緒)	JNT				JPBA member
Natsumi Koizumi (小泉奈津美)														△	?	?	?
Natsumi Koizumi (小泉奈津美)														JPBA member
Risa Suzuki (鈴木理沙)		1	1	▼	×	1	1	2	1	1	1	2		1	?	?	?
Sanae Mori (森彩奈江)	1	1	▼	×	▼	×	▼	×	1	☆	2	◎	◎	◎	?	?	?
Seul Ki Kim (김슬기)			▼	×	2		▼	×	☆	1	1	1		●	?	?	?
Seul Ki Kim (김슬기)			KPBA member
Shoko Furuta (古田翔子)														●	?	?	?
Suzuna Miyagi (宮城鈴菜)	2	▼	×	2	2	1	△	1	2	▼	×	1
Urara Himeji (姫路麗)	▼	×	▼	×	▼	×	☆	◎	1	2	1	1		1	?	?	?
Yoshimi Kobayashi (小林よしみ)		▼	×	1	▼	×		1	1	●	2	1
Yūka Kishida (岸田有加)	×		2	▼	×	▼	×		△	▼	×	1		▼	×	?	?
Amateurs
Ayano Iwami (岩美彩乃)					▼	×	▼	×						▼	×	?	?
Ayano Iwami (岩美彩乃)					3rd audition winner
Mina Endō (遠藤未菜)				1	1	▼	×	▼	×					☆	?	?	?
Mina Endō (遠藤未菜)				2nd audition winner
Name	34	35	36	37	38	39	40	41	42	43	44	45	F1	46	47	48	F2

=== Inactive and former bowlers ===
Key to table:

- ☆ - Champion, ◎ - 2nd Place, △ - 3rd Place, □ - 4th Place (T1-13).
- 2 - Eliminated in semi-finals ("ABC"/"DEF" matches in T14-current; "2nd Round" in T1-13).
- 1 - Eliminated in 1st Round (any A-F match).
- ▼ - Lowest score in a single A-F match (T31-present; starting with T42, lowest score does not matter in "season tournament 3" - see "Non-qualifier" below) or lowest score(s) in all A-F matches (T20-30).
- "Blank" - Did not compete.
- × - Banned (after previous "▼"; T21-present. Starting with T43, bowlers can only be banned for season tournaments 2 and 3, see next entry).
- ● - Non-qualifier in six-ball roll-off ("Season Tournament 1"; T43 and every third tournament thereafter)

JPBA Professionals
Name	1	2	3	4	5	6	7	8	9	10	11	12	13	14	15	16	17	18	19	20	21	22	23	24	25	26	27	28	29	30	31	32	33	34	35	36	37	38	39	40	41	42
Aino Kinjō (金城愛乃)	1	1		2	□	2	2	1	2	□	2	□	□	1	2	1	1	1	1	1	1	△	1	1	2	1	2	1	1	1	▼	×	2	▼	×	▼	×
Ayano Katai (ja:片井文乃)		△	1	□	2	1	1	1	2	△	1	◎	1	◎	1	1		1	1	1	▼	×	2	☆		2	◎	1	▼	×	▼	×	△	2	▼	×	▼	×	2	2	▼	×
Ayano Katai (ja:片井文乃)		T2 thru 24: Japan National Team																										T26-present JPBA member; leave of absence after T42
Hiroko Shimizu (清水弘子)	◎	1	△	1	△	☆	2	☆	1	1	1	1	1	1	☆	2	1	1	◎	1	1	▼	×	▼	1
Hiroko Shimizu (清水弘子)																									Resigned from JPBA after T25
Mai Takasaka (高坂麻衣)				2	1	2	□	1	☆	2	1	1	1	2	◎	1	1	△	2	1	1	1	1	1	1
Mai Takasaka (高坂麻衣)																									Resigned from JPBA after T25
Masami Abe (阿部聖水)				1
Masami Abe (阿部聖水)	competed as Misa Abe (阿部美佐)
Miho Yanagi (柳美穂)																																2	▼	×	2	2	1	▼	×
Mika Satō (佐藤美香)	2	◎
Nachimi Itakura (板倉奈智美)	1	2		◎	2
Reika Sakai (酒井玲佳)				2	1	2	1	1	2	1	□	2
Yūki Yamamoto (山本由紀)	1	2
Yukie Koyama (小山幸恵)			☆
Yukie Koyama (小山幸恵)	competed as Yukie Satō (佐藤幸恵)
Yurika Ōyama (大山由里香)	□	1
Yūko Nakatani (中谷優子)	△	1		1	☆	1	2	1	□	1	☆	2	2	1	1	1	1	◎	1	☆	1	2	1	1	1	1	1	1	2	1	1	▼	×
Yūko Nakatani (中谷優子)																																			Graduated from P-League after T34
JBC Japan National Team
Name	1	2	3	4	5	6	7	8	9	10	11	12	13	14	15	16	17	18	19	20	21	22	23	24	25	26	27	28	29	30	31	32	33	34	35	36	37	38	39	40	41	42
Junko Harigaya (張ヶ谷順子)																										1	2	☆	2	1	◎	▼	×	▼
Junko Harigaya (張ヶ谷順子)																										T26-30: amateur; T31-35 JNT
Kana Shimoide (霜出佳奈)																																		▼
Kana Shimoide (霜出佳奈)																																		JNT
Kaori Ishizuka (石塚香織)			1
Kaori Ishizuka (石塚香織)			JNT
Kumi Tsuzawa (津澤久美)		1	2	△	1	1	1
Kumi Tsuzawa (津澤久美)		Japan Nat'l Team
Maya Takemata (竹俣茉耶)					2	□	1		1	1
Maya Takemata (竹俣茉耶)					Japan Nat'l Team
Misaki Mukotani (向谷美咲)																																▼	×	▼
Misaki Mukotani (向谷美咲)																																JNT
Natsuki Sasaki (佐々木菜月)																																		1
Natsuki Sasaki (佐々木菜月)																																		JNT
Rie Totsuka (戸塚里恵)		□	1	1		1	1	2	1	1	1	1	△	1	1	1	1
Rie Totsuka (戸塚里恵)		Japan National Team
Rina Asada (浅田梨奈)						1	1	1	1	2	1	2	1	1	1	1	2	1	1	△	1	1	☆	1	1	▼	×	△	1	1	×	1	▼	×
Rina Asada (浅田梨奈)	T6-8: junior amateur								Japan National Team

=== Reporters ===
- Mitsuaki Ogawa (小川光明)
- Ryo Itsuno (伊津野亮)
- Daisuke Fujita (藤田大介)
- Saki Nakajima (中島早貴) (supporter)
- Mai Yamagishi (山岸舞彩) (assistant)
- Saki Oshiro (大城さき) (assistant)

== Wild card ==
In Tournament 13, to fill the semi-final matches, a wild card bowler came from the highest score of the ten non-winning bowlers from the first-round matches. This was Urara Himeji with a 259-game, and she went on to win both her semi-final and final matches to win the tournament.

Starting with Tournament 14, the final match wild card bowler became the player with the highest score among the ABC and DEF matches, but not winning her match. The wild card bowls in the final match against the winners of those two matches.

Tourn.	Bowler	ABC/DEF Score	Final Match
14	Ayano Katai	228	2nd
15	Hiroko Shimizu	226	Win
16	Mayumi Yoshida	215	2nd
17	Urara Himeji	279	Win
18	Hiromi Matsunaga	235	Win
19	Hiroko Shimizu	208	2nd
20	Rina Asada	204	3rd
21	Nao Ōishi	238	2nd
22	Aino Kinjō	214	3rd
23	Akiko Tanigawa	221	2nd
24	Ayano Katai	232	Win
25	Mayumi Yoshida	203	Win
26	Miki Nishimura	213	Win
27	Masami Satō	214	3rd
28	Nao Ōishi	213	2nd
29	Miki Nishimura	228	3rd
30	Miki Nishimura	210	2nd
31	Aki Nawa	224	3rd
32	Mayumi Yoshida	204	2nd
33	Ayano Katai	217	3rd
34	Masami Hasegawa	214	3rd
35	Miki Nishimura	223	2nd
36	Mayumi Yoshida	236	2nd
37	Miki Nishimura	237	2nd
38	Mika Sakai	237	3rd
39	Ayumi Kobayashi	211	3rd
40	Suzuna Miyagi	243	3rd
41	Aki Suzuki	211	Win
42	Aki Nawa	228	2nd
43	Mika Sakai	218	3rd
44	Mayumi Yoshida	224	Win
45	Aki Suzuki	235	3rd
46	Sanae Mori	197	2nd
47	Seul Ki Kim	215	Win
48	Miki Nishimura	205	2nd
49	Hiromi Matsunaga	236	Win

== Banned from the next tournament ==
Starting with Tournament 20, P-League instituted a system where bowlers could be disqualified from the next tournament because of a low score.

- From Tournaments 20 through 28, bowlers with the two lowest scores in Round 1 were banned from participating in the next P-League Tournament.
- In Tournaments 29 and 30, the three lowest scorers in Round 1 were banned from participating in the next P-League Tournament.
- Since Tournament 31, but with the exception of T42, the lowest scorer in each of the A through F matches are banned from the next tournament. This change brings the number of banned bowlers to six. Starting with T45 (and every third tournament after), for the season-ending regular tournament there are no banned bowlers. Instead, all bowlers will open the next season and tournament with a qualifying round to determine eligible bowlers.
- In all, the banned bowlers are eligible to participate in the tournament following the tournament from which they were banned. There are, however, times where a banned bowler is chosen to bowl in the next tournament, usually to fill an open spot left by a bowler who leaves P-League. When P-League's active roster is greater than 24 bowlers, a banned bowler may possibly not bowl in the next tournament that she is eligible for.

Until T46, Hiromi Matsunaga was the only bowler never to be banned under the "Round 1 low score" rule. She missed the cut in T43's qualifying round.

Tournament	Lowest scores	Roster notes
20	Risa Suzuki: 179; Aki Nawa: 169	Risa Suzuki and Aki Nawa become the first two bowlers to be banned under the new system. Natsumi Koizumi replaces Suzuna Miyagi's vacant spot within the JBC National Team. Rookie Mitsuki Nakamura is added to the JPBA roster.
21	Mitsuki Nakamura: 185; Ayano Katai: 181	Suzuna Miyagi leaves P-League permanently. Masami Satō replaces Miyagi.
22	Hiroko Shimizu: 158; Sanae Mori: 150	
23	Nao Ōishi: 170; Miki Nishimura: 167	
24	Hiroko Shimizu: 159; Mika Sakai: 146	Ayano Katai leaves JBC and applies for JPBA. Hiroko Shimizu replaces Katai despite her 2nd lowest score in #24.
25	Masami Satō: 165; Natsumi Koizumi: 164	Hiroko Shimizu and Mai Takasaka leave P-League permanently, both resigning from JPBA and joining LBO. Ayano Katai returns as a new JPBA member.
26	Yūka Kishida: 171; Rina Asada: 161	
27	Mika Sakai: 162; Risa Suzuki: 154	
28	Masami Hasegawa: 183; Mitsuki Nakamura: 172	
29	Ayano Katai: 178; Aki Nawa: 174; Mika Sakai: 165	Natsumi Koizumi went on a foreign tour, leaving her unable to participate in this tournament. Suzuna Miyagi takes her place. The rules have changed from the lowest two scores to the lowest three starting from this tournament.
30	Mayumi Yoshida: 178; Masami Hasegawa: 178; Suzuna Miyagi: 159	
31	Mitsuki Nakamura: 180; Nao Ōishi: 165; Akiko Tanigawa: 168; Ayano Katai: 183; Aino Kinjō: 173; Urara Himeji: 166	Rules have changed from the lowest three scores in first round to the lowest score in each of the six first round matches. Hasegawa returned to #31, replacing Asada, despite low score in #30.
32	Yūko Nakatani: 197; Junko Harigaya: 191; Risa Suzuki: 168; Misaki Mukotani: 206; Masami Satō: 201; Masami Hasegawa: 167	
33	Yūka Kishida: 164; Miho Yanagi: 160; Rina Asada: 200; Mitsuki Nakamura: 191; Natsumi Koizumi: 186; Aki Nawa: 185	
34	Kana Shimoide: 179; Misaki Mukotani: 172; Urara Himeji: 209; Akiko Tanigawa: 226; Aino Kinjō: 206; Junko Harigaya: 213	Debut of Kana Shimoide and Natsuki Sasaki, both members of the Japanese National Team. Due to the withdrawal of the JBC the following tournament, this was their first and last participation.
35	Ayano Katai: 184; Yoshimi Kobayashi: 187; Masami Satō: 180; Masami Hasegawa: 189; Suzuna Miyagi: 159; Mika Sakai: 176	Starting with this tournament, JBC members are not permitted to participate, resulting in the debut of Ami Tanaka, Yoshimi Kobayashi, and Miki Takehara, all recently inducted JPBA members.
36	Seul Ki Kim: 161; Sanae Mori: 167; Miki Takehara: 169; Aino Kinjō: 165; Ami Tanaka: 190; Urara Himeji: 199	Debut of Seul Ki Kim, the first Korean pro bowler to participate in P-League, and Hitomi Andō, the only professional to have passed the P-League open auditions.
37	Yūka Kishida: 159; Mayumi Yoshida: 182; Hitomi Andō: 183; Ayumi Kobayashi: 143; Risa Suzuki: 205; Ayano Katai: 156	Debut of Mina Endō. She is the sole amateur in this tournament.
38	Yoshimi Kobayashi: 174; Akiko Tanigawa: 200; Sanae Mori: 191; Miho Yanagi: 190; Urara Himeji: 196; Ayano Iwami: 191	Debut of Ayano Iwami, a P-League open audition winner who joins Endō as the second of two members. Ōishi also returns as a JPBA member, last participating in Tournament 34.
39	Yūka Kishida: 190; Aki Suzuki: 173; Mitsuki Nakamura: 166; Amu Tanaka: 198; Mina Endō: 177; Keaki Watanabe: 164	
40	Hitomi Andō: 193; Sanae Mori: 195; Akiko Tanigawa: 183; Mika Sakai: 210; Seul Ki Kim: 165; Ayano Iwami: 123	
41	Mina Endō: 213; Ayano Katai: 171; Mariko Sakurai: 201; Ayumi Kobayashi: 190; Mayumi Yoshida: 190; Mitsuki Nakamura: 166	Debut of Mariko Sakurai (see below); T41 may be Ayano Katai's final appearance in P-League, as she is to move to the United States with her husband.
42	No bowlers were banned as a result of scores.	A six ball qualifying round was held to start T43 to determine eligible bowlers. The lowest six scorers were Hitomi Andō (46), Mayumi Yoshida (49), Nao Ōishi (50), Yoshimi Kobayashi (51), Hiromi Matsunaga (51), Miki Takehara (51).
43	Mitsuki Nakamura: 189; Suzuna Miyagi: 182; Masami Satō: 175; Yūka Kishida: 186; Aki Nawa: 201; Aki Suzuki: 185	Bowlers who missed the cut during the six-ball qualifying round will fill the six available spots in T44.
44	Nao Ōishi: 150; Mai Funamoto: 177; Keaki Watanabe: 196; Mika Sakai: 149; Masami Hasegawa: 191; Mariko Sakurai: 185	
45	No bowlers were banned as a result of scores.	A six ball qualifying round was held to start T46 to determine eligible bowlers. The lowest six scorers were Shoko Furuta (49), Asami Sakurai (50), Seul Ki Kim (52), Mariko Sakurai (53), Keake Watanabe (53), Aki Suzuki (53). Urara Himeji, Mina Endō, and Hitomi Andō also had 53. They won the tiebreaker by having more strikes than Mariko Sakurai and Watanabe, and their first strike was in an earlier frame than Suzuki's.
46	Hiromi Matsunaga: 192; Yūka Kishida: 180; Mayumi Yoshida: 179; Akiko Tanigawa: 167; Ayano Iwami: 127; Nao Ōishi: 194	For the first time, Hiromi Matsunaga is banned under the "Round 1 low score" rule. Natsumi Koizumi returns as a JPBA member. Bowlers who missed the cut during the six-ball qualifying round will fill the six available spots in T47.
47	Shoko Furuta: 163; Miki Takehara: 194; Mina Endō: 177; Natsumi Koizumi: forfeited; Risa Suzuki: 216; Mika Sakai: 163	New JPBA members Asami Sakurai and Shoko Furuta debuted in this tournament.
48	No bowlers will be banned as a result of scores.	A six ball qualifying round will start T49 to determine eligible bowlers. The lowest six bowlers were Mika Sakai (48), Risa Suzuki (49), Aki Nawa (51), Mariko Sakurai (52), Natsumi Koizumi (53), and Yuka Kishida (54). They will fill the spots made available in T50.
49	TBD	Ami Tanaka makes a return since her last participation in T39. Mai Funamoto and Yoshimi Kobayashi also resume participation in this season after having not participated in Season 2. This season (T49, T50, and T51) will not feature any left-handed bowlers.

== Tournament statistics ==
=== Records ===
- Number of tournament wins: 9 - Matsunaga (T18, 19, 21, 29–32, 37, 39)
- Number of continuous tournament wins: 4 - Matsunaga (T29-32)
- Consecutive finals reached: 4 - Matsunaga (T29-32), Nishimura (T35-38)
- Consecutive semi-finals reached by winning Round 1: 7 - Nishimura (T33-39)
- Consecutive tournaments bowled without being banned (T20-41, T43- ): 23 - Matsunaga (T20-T42*)
- High score, single game: 289 - Himeji (T18)
- High three-game total (T13-current): 789 - M. Sakai (T34; 275–257–257)
- High four-game total (T1-12): 994 - Ōishi (T12; 258-247-235-254)
- Most strikes, single game: 11 - M. Sakai (T11), Mori (T13), Himeji (T17), A. Kobayashi (T35), Funamoto (T43)
- Consecutive strikes, single game: 10 - Matsunaga (T17), Himeji (T18), A. Kobayashi (T35)
- High two scores in a single match: 567 (T17) - Matsunaga (288) and Himeji (279)
- High three scores in a single match (T13-current): 748 (T21) - Matsunaga (277), Mori (223) and Ōishi (248)

* T42 did not use the ban system. (See "Current Format" above for more details.) In the six-ball roll-off prior to T43, Matsunaga did not qualify for T43.
Technically, she didn't get banned in T42, but she did fail to reach T43, so the record stops at 23.

=== Errors ===
All errors are the result of the first ball, unless otherwise noted.

- Reika Sakai - T7, 1B, 6th frame - gutter (6 pins on 2nd ball)
- Rie Totsuka - T17, 1A, 9th frame - foul (8 pins on 2nd ball)
- Mika Sakai - T22, 1A, 9th frame - gutter (9 pins on 2nd ball)
- Hiroko Shimizu - T24, 1F, 6th frame - foul (10 pins/spare on 2nd ball)
- Hiroko Shimizu - T24, 1F, 8th frame - foul on 2nd ball (9 pins on 1st ball)
- Miki Nishimura - T27, 1A, 9th frame - gutter (6 pins on 2nd ball)
- Junko Harigaya - T30, 1C, 7th frame - foul (10 pins/spare on 2nd ball)
- Seul Ki Kim - T38, 1B, 4th frame - gutter (9 pins on 2nd ball)
- Mariko Sakurai - T41, 1C, 7th frame - gutter (10 pins/spare on 2nd ball)
- Urara Himeji - T46, 1C, 8th frame - foul on 2nd ball (9 pins on 1st ball)
- Nao Oishi - T49, ABC, 10th frame - foul on final ball (2 strikes in 10th, no spare attempt)

== Tournament notes ==
Tournament 17: Hiromi Matsunaga makes P-League history by scoring the highest three-game series of 781 by way of games of 278, 288 and 215. The two semifinal matches are among the most exciting thus far. In the ABC match, Urara Himeji stays behind Matsunaga, and matches all but just one of Matsunaga's 10 consecutive strikes leading to the 10th frame. Himeji finishes first by striking out in the frame for a 279, and takes some of the pressure off of Matsunaga, while she deals with the possibly of rolling a perfect 300-game. Unfortunately, Matsunaga throws the ball high and leaves the 4–7, and finishes with a 288. In the DEF match, Mika Sakai keeps a steady lead over both Sanae Mori and Nao Ōishi. Mori's soft-10 pin leave in the 9th frame takes her out of contention. In the 10th, Sakai loses her chance of shutting out Ōishi by leaving a ringing 10-pin on the first ball. Sakai finishes with a 237, and forces Ōishi to strike out in the 10th to take a one-pin victory. Ōishi rolls the first two strikes, but leaves a half-10 pin on the last ball, to tie the match at 237. Ōishi wins the one-ball roll-off 10–9. Himeji takes the wild card position with her 279 score. Himeji takes advantage of her second wind via the wild card, and fires off a five-bagger to take command of the final match, and wins the match and tournament with a 238.

Tournament 28: For the first time in P-League history, all members of the Japan National Team won their first round matches (Ōishi, Asada, and Koizumi) and reached the ABC/DEF matches. It is also the first time all three positions in either the ABC or DEF match are filled by members of the Japan National Team. It is the first time all amateurs (four of them in Round 28) have qualified for the ABC/DEF matches. It is also the second time (previously T12) the final match consisted entirely of amateurs (Asada, Harigaya, and Ōishi as the wild card). With her win, Harigaya is the first bowler without affiliation to the Japan National Team nor the JPBA to win.

Tournament 30: Hiromi Matsunaga matches Urara Himeji's record of five tournament wins. The final match had a line-up that matched the line-up in Tournament 29 (Mori, Matsunaga, and Nishimura). The win was also the second time that Matsunaga won two consecutive tournaments (T18 and 19). This round also introduced Saki Nakajima as a supporter.

Tournament 31: Hiromi Matsunaga sets new records for not only the most tournament wins with six, but also the number of continuous wins (three). The rules changed in Round 31, where the lowest scorers in each of A-F matches are banned from the next tournament. This rule changed the dynamics of the A-F matches, as each bowler is now faced with not only losing the first round match, but also not rolling the worst score in the match. The mood was noticeably more serious in the A-F matches than in previous rounds.

Tournament 33: After four straight tournament wins, Hiromi Matsunaga loses to Aino Kinjō in Match 33C, 225–226. After a strike in the foundation ninth frame, Matsunaga brought a 21-pin lead over Kinjō with her to the 10th frame. Matsunaga rolls the ball straight into the head-pin, leaving the difficult 4–10 split. Missing the split, Kinjō is forced to cover 20 pins in the 10th frame. A strike on the first ball gives Kinjō a comfortable position to collect the needed ten pins in the last two balls. Kinjō was then defeated in the ABC semi-final match against Miki Nishimura. Nishimura and best-friend Urara Himeji meet up with Ayano Katai in the final match. Nishimura started strong with a turkey in the first three frames, along with Katai's four-bagger. Katai falls out of contention with consecutive opens in the fifth and sixth frames. After a slow start with a 65 in the fourth frame for Himeji, she finishes the match with eight straight strikes for a 245 - forcing Nishimura to match her, starting at the eighth frame for any chance of taking advantage of a break by Himeji. Nishimura ends up short, rolling a 233 and a second-place finish. It is Himeji's sixth tournament win, and is only one win away from matching Matsunaga's record of seven tournament wins.

Tournament 34: Three new members of P-League make their debut. Ayumi Kobayashi (age 21) earned her JPBA membership earlier in 2011. Satsuki Sasaki (23) is the newest member of the Japan national team. Kana Shimoide (17) is also a Japan national team member, and is currently attending high school. Mika Sakai breaks Hiromi Matsunaga's three-game record by rolling games of 275, 257 and 257 for a 789 series. Masami Hasegawa makes the final match for the first time. Mayumi Yoshida and Sakai tie in the final match with a 257–257 score. Yoshida wins the tie-breaker and tournament 10–7.

Tournament 35: Yūko Nakatani retires from P-League after Tournament 34. Three new JPBA members are added to the active roster: Yoshimi Kobayashi, Miki Takehara and Ami Tanaka. For the first time since Tournament 1, no members of the Japan National Team or JBC are in the line-up.

Tournament 36: Two new bowlers are added to the active roster: Hitomi Andō, a winner of the P-League open auditions, and Seul Ki Kim, a KPBA member.

Tournament 37: Mina Endō, one of the amateurs who passed the P-League open auditions, is added to the roster. This is the first appearance by an amateur after two tournaments. In the first semi-final match, Mitsuki Nakamura and Miki Nishimura both finish with a 237; using a frame-by-frame tie-breaker rule, where the last highest score in a frame wins, it was determined Nishimura was eligible for the Wild Card position. They both had a 217 in the ninth frame, but Nakamura had a 188, while Nishimura had a 197 in the eighth frame—this gave her the win.

Tournament 38: Ayano Iwami, the second amateur who passed the P-League open auditions, is added to the roster; she is the first "back-up ball" bowler (throwing with her right hand but hooking like a left-hander's ball) to feature in the show's history. Nao Ōishi, who was a member of the Japanese National Team, topped the pro test in 2012, regaining her eligibility into P-League. Ōishi, a three-time winner, was featured in "dream match" E, consisting of eight-time winner Hiromi Matsunaga and five-time winner Urara Himeji. These three bowlers, at the time of the tournament, are the three highest average bowlers in P-League history. Mitsuki Nakamura makes it to the final match for her first time with 267 scores in each of her first two matches. The final match was filled with 10-pin leaves, making for a low scoring event. Nakamura had a slight lead heading into the 10th frame. However, in the 10th, her first ball doesn't bite the lane, missing the head pin completely and leaves the 1-2-4-10 washout. Barely missing the spare, she finished with a 193. Needing just a 7-count on her last ball in the 10th, Miki Nishimura strikes and scores a 197, to secure her third P-League tournament win. Nakamura finishes second. Mika Sakai, after making the final as a wild card, places third with a 181.

Tournament 39: Hiromi Matsunaga extends her record for tournaments won to nine.

Tournament 40: For the first time since P-League switched to its current format in Tournament 14, the winner of Match C in the first round wins the overall tournament. Urara Himeji breaks the jinx by defeating Miki Takehara and Suzuna Miyagi. It is Himeji's seventh tournament win. It was also both Takehara and Miyagi's first visits to the final match. Himeji takes over second place in all-time scoring average with a 220.3 average for 67 games. Nao Ōishi drops to third place all-time at 220.2 after 47 games. Hiromi Matsunaga, averaging 231.2, continues to lead P-League in this category. Ayano Iwami bowls an all-time P-League low score of 123 in the first round.

Tournament 41: Aki Suzuki wins her first P-League tournament and becomes the first bowler since Tournament 26 to win after qualifying for the final match as the wild card. Mariko Sakurai becomes the second bowler in P-League history to convert the difficult 4-6-7-9-10 split, also known as the "greek church," doing so in Match C. Aino Kinjō previously converted the split, doing so in Tournament 10 in the 3rd-place play-off match.

Tournament 42: Seul Ki Kim becomes the first foreign bowler to win a P-League tournament.

Tournament 43: T43 is the first of three tournaments that make up Season 1 (the others being T44 and T45.) Hiromi Matsunaga failed to qualify for T43 during the six-ball qualifier, which breaks her record of consecutive tournaments bowled without being banned at 23. Mai Funamoto makes her P-League debut by rolling the highest game of 264 by a first-timer. Masami Satō returns after being away from P-League since T35 due to an injury. Tamachi Hi-Lane will undergo renovations during T44. P-League will return to Tamachi Hi-Lane in T45. Sanae Mori wins her first P-League tournament by defeating Miki Nishimura and Mika Sakai.

Season 1 Final: Sanae Mori qualified for the Season 1 Final with 24 points by winning T43, semi-finals in T44, and 2nd place in T45. Yoshida Mayumi qualified by winning T44 and T45, despite failing to qualify for T43 during the six-ball qualifier. Miki Nishimura qualified with 13 points. She lost in the first round of T45 to Mori, and had to wait for the results of the matches for Ayumi Kobayashi (lost in 1st round T45, 10 points) and Hitomi Andō (lost in semi-finals DEF T45, 10 points). Mayumi became "Season Queen" with a score of 227. Mori and Nishimura tied at 213 and had a 1 ball roll-off for 2nd and 3rd place. They were tied after 3 roll-off frames, but Mori claimed 2nd place after she rolled a strike and Nishimura rolled 9 in the 4th roll-off frame.

Tournament 46: Mina Endō became the first amateur to win the tournament since Junko Harigaya in T28. Natsumi Koizumi finished 3rd in her first tournament as a professional. Sanae Mori bowled the lowest score (so far) to get the wild card over Aki Nawa by one pin (197–196). She finished 2nd. For the first time, Hiromi Matsunaga gets banned from the next tournament under the "Round 1 low score" rule in Match A.

== Public affairs ==
=== Merchandise ===
Besides its weekly television show, P-League also sells merchandise for fans, in the form of DVDs, books, calendars, and other merchandise.

Currently, P-League has released seven DVD sets. None of the content have been shown in the television series. Volume 1 profiles the original members of P-League. Volumes 2 and 3 include "doubles" tournaments. Volume 4 features an "East v. West" team challenge, where the 20 competitors are divided into two teams of ten, based on their hometowns.

On April 25, 2011, P-League released a five-year anniversary commemorative DVD set, including all four previously released DVDs and an all-new P-League Volume 5. First editions of the DVD set includes a logo'd hand towel and pin. The first half of the DVD includes a top-10 matches showcase, followed by a split-making review from past tournaments. The second half includes a segment called "P-TALK", and is moderated by Japanese tarento Teruyuki Tsuchida.

P-League released volume 6 on March 21, 2012. The top four bowlers at the time (Matsunaga, Himeji, Nishimura, and Mori) become team captains, and participate in a P-League draft. Sixteen bowlers are picked by the captains, forming four teams of five bowlers - including the captains. The teams battle in a best-of-three competition, combining team, doubles, and singles matches. Each of the winning teams move on to the final match, while the losing teams play for third place.

Volume 7 was released on November 30, 2012. Four Japanese tarento are appointed as team captains, and participate in a P-League draft. Twenty bowlers are picked by the captains, forming four teams of five bowlers - with the captains not participating in the matches. Captains are:

- Maggy Shinji (マギー審司), a magician famous for his signature large ear;
- Takehiro Murata (村田雄浩), an actor who stars in many Japanese television dramas, including Wataru Seken wa Oni Bakari;
- Kazutomo Miyamoto (宮本和知), a former professional Japanese baseball player, who played for the Yomiuri Giants;
- Guadalcanal Taka (ガダルカナル・タカ), a comedian and a member of Beat Takeshi's entertainment group;

Tournament format is similar to Volume 6. In the first round, the matches are Team Murata vs. Team Taka, and Team Miyamoto vs. Team Shinji. P-League's first 300 game is also featured in the volume set, although the scores in the DVD sets do not count towards official P-League statistics.

Volume 8 will be released November 30, 2013. The P-League draft and tournament format remain the same as Volumes 6 and 7. In Volume 8, all four captains will bowl in the matches.

P-League has released four sets of collectors cards, each using the tagline Fairies on the Lane. The cards are similar to baseball cards in that the cards feature a photo of the bowler on the front, and her P-League statistics on the back. The sets were released in 2009, 2010, 2012 and 2013. The 2014 edition is scheduled for release in Winter 2014.

P-League also publishes desk calendars. In Japan, October is often considered the start of calendar season, where stores and other sources throughout Japan release calendars for the following year. The more popular calendars are usually sold out within one month of release. The P-League calendar is only available via mail-order directly from the JPBA. Calendars for 2013 and 2014 have been made available.

=== Publicity ===
To market P-League in Japan, the members take part in television shows and magazines, as well as bowling clinics, demonstrations and practice sessions throughout East Asia.

In the August 26, 2008 issue of the swimsuit modeling magazine Friday Dynamite (フライデーダイナマイト), Aki Nawa, Sanae Mori, Junko Harigaya and others were showcased in a pictorial, posing in both bowling and casual attire.

In 2009, Aki Nawa represented P-League, along with other women representing other sports, in a comedy variety show. Nawa participated in a cosplay fashion show, dressing up as a Japanese high school girl.

In 2010, Urara Himeji and Miki Nishimura visited South Korea, and competed against two members of the Korean Professional Bowlers Association (KPBA). In April 2010, a group of P-League members, along with Mika Sakai's father Takeo Sakai, competed with various Japanese tarento in a one-minute strike competition.

In 2012, select members of P-League participated in the Japanese TV variety show Honoo-no Taiiku-kai TV (炎の体育会TV) in a split making competition with various Japanese tarento. Sanae Mori, Rina Suzuki and Ayano Katai were guests on Takeshi's Todoroki Base, hosted by Beat Takeshi, along with Emiko Namiki (並木惠美子), JPBA license 5 and a member of Class 1 (1967) when the JPBA was first founded. This show covered the history of women professional bowling in Japan, and ended with a pro versus tarento match.

=== DHC, LBO and JBC ===
According to a blog entry made by Mai Takasaka in 2009, Daigaku Honyaku Center (DHC) was very displeased with JPBA president Ritsuko Nakayama appearing in a television commercial for Suntory, a direct competitor of DHC. DHC's chairman, Yoshiaki Yoshida is a major supporter of bowling in Japan, including the JBC. Soon after Yoshida learned of Nakayama's appearance in the Suntory commercial, he said that as a JPBA officer, Nakayama was irresponsible, and even used the term "evil" when describing her involvement in the commercial. Soon after, DHC cancelled the DHC Ladies Bowling Tour, the DHC Cup Girls Bowling International, and anything else it had to do with the JPBA.

DHC then created the Ladies Bowling Organization (LBO), in order to compete directly with the JPBA. In February 2010, Hiroko Shimizu and Mai Takasaka resigned from the JPBA and P-League, and joined the LBO. Other non-P-League members of the JPBA also resigned and moved over to the LBO. Koji Yamamoto, an expert analyst for P-League, resigned from the JPBA to become Secretary General Executive Director of the LBO.

Soon after the creation of the LBO, DHC and the LBO faxed a letter to the JPBA making a proposal to have P-League consist of both JPBA and LBO bowlers. The JPBA did not accept the proposal. DHC is now sponsoring a weekly TV show in Japan, with emphasis on the LBO, JBC and amateur bowlers alike. The show is hosted by the DHC Bowling Girls (Junko Harigaya is no longer a member, but she can still be seen in the opening and closing credits, along with current LBO members Yūki Akiyoshi and Yūka Sasaki.)

Other complaints about the JPBA include management from within, and the decline of tournaments and prize money. Members of the LBO are also DHC employees, and therefore work in other capacities within DHC, such as endorsements of DHC products. JPBA members, on the other hand, need to work in other jobs outside of the JPBA to earn a living. Before moving to the LBO, Shimizu worked nights in Tokyo at a bar as a hostess. She is currently vice-president of the LBO.

Despite the intensity between the JPBA and DHC/LBO, DHC-sponsored bowlers Keaki Watanabe, Miki Nishimura, Mika Sakai and Aino Kinjō stayed with the JPBA and P-League. Also, former Japan National Team members Nao Ōishi and Natsumi Koizumi chose the JPBA over the LBO when deciding to become a professional. Current JNT member Junko Harigaya repeated her 2011 win in the amateur division of the JLBC's 2012 Professional Women's Bowling Rookie Battle, solidifying her commitment with the JPBA. Harigaya currently works in marketing for Sunbridge - a Japan-based distributor for Brunswick Corporation's bowling division.

As of Tournament 35, no JBC members are allowed to participate in P-League. According to the JBC, there were reported incidents where its members were being stalked in public by fans of P-League. As a safety measure put down by the JBC Board of Directors on September 25, 2011, the JBC will no longer participate in P-League.

To fill the void left by the departed JBC members, P-League held a "Next Era P-Leaguer" audition, and was publicized throughout Tournament 35. Female bowlers - regardless of amateur/professional status - between the ages of 16 and 28 were allowed to participate. Hitomi Andō, Mina Endō and Ayano Iwami were the top qualifiers. Andō, a professional bowler, debuted in Tournament 36, followed by amateurs Endō (T37), and Iwami (T38).

== See also ==
- DHC Ladies Bowling Tour
