= DHC Ladies Bowling Tour =

- Formation: 2005
- Dissolved: 2009
- Purpose: Professional ten-pin bowling tour in Japan, sanctioned by the JPBA
- Headquarters: Tokyo, Japan
- Region served: Japan
- Members: Mainly Japanese nationals.
- Official language: Japanese
- Website: http://top.dhc.co.jp/contents/support/bowling/

DHC Ladies Bowling Tour (DHCレディースオープンボウリングツアー) (DHC LBT) was a Japan-based bowling tour for women bowlers. The Tour hosted a series of four to five tournaments each year throughout Japan. The tournaments were open to both professionals and amateurs. The Tour's corporate sponsor was DHC Corporation, a maker of cosmetics and health food supplements. The CEO of DHC is Yoshiaki Yoshida - one of the biggest supporters of the sport of bowling in Japan. DHC LBT started up in 2005, and was sanctioned by the Japan Professional Bowling Association (JPBA).

In addition to the Tour's tournaments, DHC also hosted the DHC Cup Girls Bowling International, at the time the third-biggest tournament for women in the world, just behind the Women's U.S. Open and the USBC Queens. The DHC members also competed in other non-DHC events, such as P-League.

According to DHC's web site, the Tour was canceled, citing various circumstances. In May 2010, DHC officially separates itself from the JPBA, by announcing it will be the major sponsor of the LBO Ladies Bowling Tour, and will be operated by the Ladies Bowling Organization of Japan. The JPBA and LBO are currently competing professional leagues. As of June 2010, twelve bowlers resigned from the JPBA and moved over to the LBO - including Hiroko Shimizu and Mai Takasaka.

== 2005/2006 season ==
- Tournament 1: May 20 to May 22, 2005, Sagamihara Park Lanes (winner: Mika Sakai)
- Tournament 2: June 9 to June 11, 2005, Bowl Mate Kyobashi (winner: Shinobu Saito)
- Tournament 3: August 25 to August 27, 2005, Bowl Aoki (winner: Kazue Inahashi)
- Tournament 4: October 7 to October 9, 2005, Kakitagawa Park Lanes (winner: Keiko Aiko)
- Tournament 5: January 20 to January 22, 2006, Hakata Star Lane (winner: Nachimi Itakura)
- Tournament 6: February 24 to February 26, 2006, Hoshigaoka Bowl (winner: Hiroko Shimizu)
- Final: April 12 to April 16, 2006, Tokyo Dome Bowling Center (winner: Akiko Tanigawa)

== 2006/2007 season ==
- Tournament 1： September 15 to September 17, 2006, Kakitagawa Park Lanes (winner: Hiroko Shimizu)
- Tournament 2： October 27 to October 29, 2006, Sagamihara Park Lanes (winner: Mitsuko Tokimoto)
- Tournament 3： January 19 to January 21, 2007, Tokyo Port Bowl (winner: Mayumi Yoshida)
- Tournament 4： February 23 to February 25, 2007, Mizushima International Bowling Hall (winner: Hiroko Shimizu)
- Final： March 30 to April 4, 2007,SAP Soka Bowl (winner: Ayami Kondo)

== 2007/2008 season ==
- Tournament 1: October 5 to October 7, 2007, Sagamihara Park Lanes (winner: Aino Kinjō)
- Tournament 2: January 18 to January 20, 2008, Kakitagawa Park Lanes (winner: Yuko Nakatani)
- Tournament 3: February 22 to February 24, 2008, Hakata Star Lanes (winner: Suzuna Miyagi)
- Tournament 4: April 24 to April 27, 2008, Shinagawa Prince Hotel (winner: Urara Himeji)

== 2009 season ==
- Tournament 1: February 20 to February 22, Sagamihara Park Lanes (winner: Masae Nakajima)
- Tournament 2: May 8 to May 10, Tokyo Port Bowl (winner: Mai Takasaka)
- Tournaments 3 and 4 were canceled.

== See also ==
- Bowling Revolution P-League
- LBO Ladies Bowling Tour
