= Pesek =

Pesek may refer to:

- Pesek, a village near Križevci, Croatia
- Pesek, a community in the municipality of San Dorligo della Valle, Italy
- Pesek and Pesek Kechil, former islands now part of Jurong Island, Singapore
- Pesek Zman, an Israeli brand of chocolate snacks

People:

- Pešek, a Czech surname
- Beatrix Pesek, Hungarian ten-pin bowler
- John Pesek (1894–1978), American wrestler
