= DeeRonn Booker =

American ten-pin bowler

Personal information
- Born: Late 1990 or early 1991
- Years active: 2018–

Bowling Information
- Affiliation: PBA
- Rookie year: 2018
- Dominant hand: Right
- Wins: 1

DeeRonn Booker is an American professional ten-pin bowler. On March 31, 2024, Booker became the third black bowler to win a major title on the Professional Bowlers Association (PBA) Tour.

== Personal ==
Originally from Pomona, California, Booker lives in Albuquerque, New Mexico where he is the pro shop manager of the Starlight Bowling Center located inside the Santa Ana Star Casino Hotel.

In 2009, Booker appeared on The Price Is Right television show, winning the showcase.

In July 2026, Booker announced on his Instagram page that he had been diagnosed with BPDCN, which is a rare, aggressive form of leukemia. He stated he had already started chemotherapy and would remain in the hospital under medical supervision for about a month. He will also need a bone marrow transplant as part of his treatment. "I have a long road to recovery, but I’m going to beat this," Booker wrote. In early October, Booker posted: "It’s been 3 months and 4 rounds of chemotherapy since my diagnosis, and my lab work is coming back clean with no cancer cells detected. By no means does this mean I’m cured; it simply means that my body is back to producing healthy red and white blood cells, which in turn is allowing my immune system to work normally again." He stated he had returned to the lanes to practice, in hopes of competing in upcoming PBA Regional Tour events.

== Career ==
Yes, I'm a little bit darker, but I'm still a person. I want others just to see me as a person, not to see me as a Black individual. I want them to see me as a person and say, "That guy can bowl. That guy won a title. That guy made the show." ... I'm hoping that what I'm doing is touching other people and it's helping others get to wherever they want to go in this game and in life in general.

— DeeRonn Booker
March 2024

Booker won the doubles Eagle at the July 2023 USBC Open Championships, and during January 2023's Team USA Trials Booker led the first round of qualifying. From 2018 through 2023, Booker cashed in 13 of 36 PBA events.

On March 31, 2024, in his second year as a full-time professional bowler and in his PBA Tour television debut, Booker won the 2024 USBC Masters tournament held at Suncoast Bowling Center in Las Vegas. This, his first tour title, was in a major PBA national tournament. He finished 58th out of 465 players after 15 games of qualifying to barely make the 64-player double-elimination match play phase. But he then won six consecutive three-game total pinfall matches to earn the No. 1 seed position for the stepladder final. He won the championship game over Patrick Dombrowski, and received the $100,000 first prize.

Booker thus became the third black player to win a title and major on the PBA Tour, joining George Branham III (1993) and Gary Faulkner Jr. (2015).

Booker's "strike song" during the televised March 2024 Masters broadcast was the Price is Right theme song, a reference to his 2009 appearance on that TV show.

== See also ==
- List of ten-pin bowlers
