= DHC Cup Girls Bowling International =

The DHC Cup Girls Bowling International is an annual ten-pin bowling event for professional and amateur female bowlers, held in Japan, and is sanctioned by the Japan Bowling Congress (JBC). Offering an award purse of ¥12.0 million (approx. US$128,000), it is currently the third-biggest tournament for females in the world in terms of money, just behind the U.S. Women's Open and the USBC Queens.

Established in 2007, bowlers from all over the world are invited to compete, although the majority of bowlers competing are from the JBC, the Japan Professional Bowling Association (JPBA), and DHC's own team of bowlers from the DHC Ladies Bowling Tour. Other competitors from outside Japan come from other professional and amateur organizations - including the United States-based Professional Bowlers Association (PBA). Several of the foreign competitors from outside Japan are hosted by DHC Corporation, by covering their airfare and accommodations.

== 2007 tournament ==
The 2007 tournament's first prize was JPY¥500,000 (approx. US$4,185). The tournament was held April 14 to April 15 at Shinagawa Prince Hotel Bowling Center in Tokyo. Thirty-five* women made up the 1st annual event's field. After six games of qualifying, the top eight bowlers made up the television final. The winner was Suzuna Miyagi of the Japan Bowling Congress (JBC).

Championship Round:

1. Suzuna Miyagi, JBC, 1138 (5 games), JPY¥500,000
2. Shalin Zulkifli, Malaysia, 199 (1 game)
3. Urara Himeji, JPBA, 225 (1 game)
4. Putty Armein, Indonesia, 185 (1 game)
5. Cherie Tan Shi Hua, Singapore, 197 (1 game)
6. Maki Nakano, JBC, 201 (1 game)
7. Rie Totsuka, JBC, 167 (1 game)
8. Esther Cheah, Malaysia, 211 (1 game)

Playoff Results:

Shootout Match
#7 Miyagi (223) def. #8 Cheah (211), # 5 Nakano (201) and #6 Totsuka (167)
First Match
#7 Miyagi def. #4 Tan Shi Hua, 205-197
Second Match
#7 Miyagi def. #3 Armein, 228-185
Third Match
#7 Miyagi def. #2 Himeji, 237-225
Title Match
#7 Miyagi def. #1 Zulkifli, 245-199

- Note: The field was originally 36 bowlers. Choi Jin-a injured her left leg two days before the competition started.

== 2008 tournament ==
The 2008 tournament's purse was JPY¥12.0 million (approx. US$128,000), with the winner taking back home JPY¥3.0 million (approx. US$12,800). The tournament was held March 7 to March 9 at Shinagawa Prince Hotel Bowling Center in Tokyo. Seventy-one women made up the 2nd annual event's field. After 18 games of qualifying, the top eight bowlers made up the television final. The winner was Nao Ōishi of the Japan Bowling Congress (JBC).

Championship Round:

1. Nao Ōishi, JBC, 208 (1 game), JPY¥3,000,000
2. Tannya Roumimper, Indonesia, 674 (3 games), JPY¥800,000
3. Kelly Kulick, PBA, 204 (1 game), JPY¥1,500,000
4. Hiromi Matsunaga, JPBA, 681 (3 games), JPY¥400,000
5. Mai Takasaka, JPBA, 194 (1 game), JPY¥600,000
6. Choi Jin-a, Korea, 224 (1 game), JPY¥500,000
7. Yūko Nakatani, JPBA, 234 (1 game), JPY¥400,000
8. Hiroko Shimizu, JPBA, 235 (1 game), JPY¥400,000

Playoff Results:

Shootout Match
#7 Matsunaga (248) def. #8 Shimizu (235), # 5 Choi (224) and #6 Nakatani (234)
First Match
#7 Matsunaga def. #4 Takasaka, 215-194
Second Match
#3 Roumimper def. #7 Matsunaga, 279-218
Third Match
#3 Roumimper def. #2 Kulick, 207-204
Title Match
#1 Ōishi def. #3 Roumimper, 208-188

- Note: Roumimper rolled a 300-game during the first 3-game block (2nd game.)

== 2009 tournament ==
The 2009 tournament's purse was JPY¥12.0 million (approx. US$128,000), with the winner taking back home JPY¥3.0 million (approx. US$12,800). The tournament was held March 6 to March 8 at Shinagawa Prince Hotel Bowling Center in Tokyo. Ninety women made up the 3rd annual event's field. After 18 games of qualifying, the top eight bowlers made up the television final. The winner was Jeon Eun-hee of Korea.

Championship Round:

1. Jeon Eun-hee, Korea, 1126 (5 games), JPY¥3,000,000
2. Cherie Tan, Singapore, 179 (1 game), JPY¥1,500,000
3. Yūko Nakatani, JPBA, 211 (1 game), JPY¥800,000
4. Hisano Igarashi, JPBA, 226 (1 game), JPY¥600,000
5. Liz Johnson, PBA, 208 (1 game), JPY¥500,000
6. Missy Bellinder, PBA, 232 (1 game), JPY¥400,000
7. Sharon Koh, Malaysia, 167 (1 game), JPY¥400,000
8. Mayumi Yoshida, JPBA, 201 (1 game), JPY¥400,000

Playoff Results:

Shootout Match
#8 Jeon (239) def. #5 Bellinder (232), # 7 Yoshida (201) and #6 Koh (167)
First Match
#5 Jeon def. #4 Johnson, 216-208
Second Match
#5 Jeon def. #3 Igarashi, 237-226
Third Match
#5 Jeon def. #2 Nakatani, 255-211
Title Match
#5 Jeon def. #1 Tan, 9-7 in the second rolloff after a 179-179 and 9-9 tie.
