= Akiyoshi =

Akiyoshi (written: 秋吉 or 穐吉) is a Japanese surname. Notable people with the surname include:

- Kousuke Akiyoshi (秋吉 耕佑; born 1975), Japanese motorcycle racer
- Kumiko Akiyoshi (秋吉 久美子; born 1954), Japanese actress
- Ryo Akiyoshi (秋吉 亮; born 1989), Japanese baseball player
- Shota Akiyoshi (秋吉 翔太; born 1990), Japanese golfer
- Taisuke Akiyoshi (秋吉 泰佑; born 1989), Japanese footballer
- Toshiko Akiyoshi (穐吉 敏子; born 1929), Japanese American musician
- Yūki Akiyoshi (秋吉 夕紀; born 1985), Japanese ten-pin bowler

Akiyoshi (written: 昭義, 昭良, 昭美, 明慶, 明佳, 昌慶 顕義 or 顕能) is also a masculine Japanese given name. Notable people with the name include:

- Ichijō Akiyoshi (一条 昭良; 1605–1672), Japanese kugyō
- Akiyoshi Katsuno (勝野 昌慶; born 1997), Japanese baseball player
- Kitabatake Akiyoshi (北畠 顕能; 1326–1383), Japanese warlord
- Akiyoshi Kitaoka (北岡 明佳; born 1961), Japanese psychologist
- Akiyoshi Matsuoka (松岡 昭義; born 1945), Japanese cross-country skier
- Akiyoshi Nakao (中尾 明慶; born 1988), Japanese actor
- Akiyoshi Ohmachi (大町 昭義; born 1958), Japanese golfer
- Akiyoshi Segawa (瀬川 昭義; born 1934), Japanese ice hockey player
- Akiyoshi Sugiura (杉浦 昭嘉), Japanese film director
- Akiyoshi Umekawa (梅川 昭美; 1948–1979), Japanese mass murderer
- Yamada Akiyoshi (山田 顕義; 1844–1892), Japanese politician and samurai
- Akiyoshi Yoshida (吉田 昭義; born 1966), Japanese footballer
