= Yuki Yamada =

Yuki Yamada may refer to:

- Yuki Yamada (actor) (born 1990), Japanese actor
- Yuki Yamada (darts player) (born 1983), Japanese darts player
- Yuki Yamada (bowler), Japanese ten-pin bowler competing in the Bowling Revolution P-League
