= Japan Bowling Congress =

- Abbreviation: JBC
- Formation: 1964
- Purpose: Governing body for ten-pin bowling in Japan.
- Headquarters: Tokyo, Japan
- Region served: Japan
- Members: Japanese nationals
- Official language: Japanese
- President: Tsutomu Takebe
- Website: Official site

Japan Bowling Congress (全日本ボウリング協会, Zen Nihon Bōringu Kyōkai) (JBC) is the major sanctioning body for the sport of ten-pin bowling in Japan. The JBC sanctions tournaments and other functions related to amateur bowling for both men and women. The current president of the JBC is Tsutomu Takebe. The JBC was established during the 1964 Summer Olympics in Tokyo. Its headquarters is in Shiba, Minato, Tokyo.

The JBC works with other bowling organizations within Japan and the world, including the Japan Professional Bowling Association (JPBA), the Asian Bowling Federation (ABF), the International Bowling Federation (FIQ) and the World Tenpin Bowling Association (WTBA). The WTBA is the international body that covers the rules and regulations of the sport of ten-pin bowling. The ABF represents the entire Asian region, while the JBC reports to the ABF.

== See also ==
- World Tenpin Bowling Association
- United States Bowling Congress (equivalent to the JBC)
- Japan Professional Bowling Association
