= Santa Ana Star Casino Hotel =

Casino in New Mexico, United States

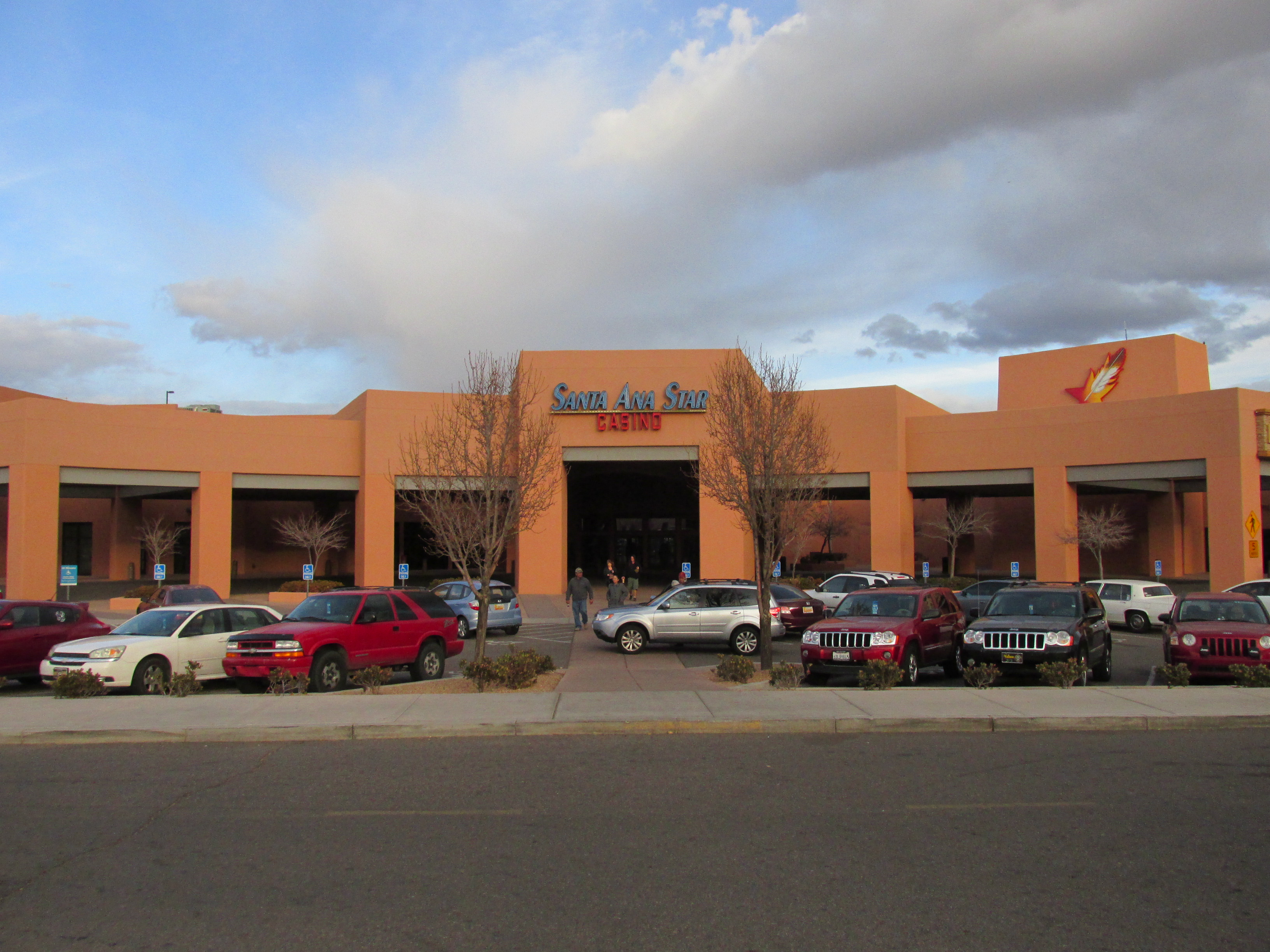
- Interactive map of Santa Ana Star Casino Hotel
- Location: 54 Jemez Canyon Dam Road Santa Ana Pueblo, New Mexico; 35°19′43.7″N 106°33′56.0″W
- Opened: 1993
- No. of rooms: 204
- Gaming space: 109,000 sq ft (10,100 m^{2})
- Casino type: Land-based
- Owner: Pueblo of Santa Ana
- Renovated in: 1998, 2000, 2017, 2018
- Website: https://www.santaanastar.com/

Santa Ana Star Casino Hotel is a Native American casino on the Pueblo of Santa Ana in Bernalillo, New Mexico. The casino is located 10 miles (16 km) North of Albuquerque, and right next to Rio Rancho. at 54 Jemez Canyon Dam Road, Santa Ana Pueblo, NM 87004 in Sandoval County, at 35°20'44" North, 106°31'24" West (35.345446, -106.523309).

== History ==
Santa Ana Star Casino Hotel was founded by the Tamaya at the Pueblo of Santa Ana and opened in 1993 co-located with its retail smoke shop. The Pueblo, named Tamaya in the native language, is located on 73,000 acres (295 km²) of reservation land in the Rio Grande Valley.

The casino purchased naming rights to the Santa Ana Star Center in a five-year, $2.5 million deal signed in July 2006. Santa Ana Star Casino purchased. Santa Ana Star Casino has partnerships with other nearby businesses owned or located on the pueblo. These include the Twin Warriors Golf Club and Santa Ana Golf Club, Hyatt Regency Tamaya resort, Warrior 66 Fuel gas station and convenience store, and the Santa Ana Garden Center.

=== Expansion ===
In 1998 they added several slots, and in 2000 they added a thousand more. In 2017 they added hotel rooms, a swimming pool, and The Stage at the Star. On July 4, 2018, they opened Mesa Grille, The Feast Buffet, Cantina Rio, Lounge 54, Starlight Bar & Grill, and Juniper Steakhouse.

== Facilities ==
=== Gaming ===
Santa Ana Star Casino Hotel has 109,000 square feet (10,100 m^{2}) of gaming space devoted to both slot machines and table games. The casino has 1,475 slot machines, and 20 table games including blackjack, roulette, pai gow, 4-card poker, Let It Ride, craps and live poker.

Santa Ana Star Casino Hotel’s loyalty program is The Star Rewards Players Club.

=== Restaurants ===
Santa Ana Star Casino Hotel has five restaurants: Mesa Grille, The Feast Buffet, Cantina Rio, Lounge 54, Starlight Bar & Grill, and Juniper Steakhouse opening previously mentioned: July 4, 2018.

=== The Stage ===
Santa Ana Star Casino hosts live comedy and EDM DJ Events in its in-house Nightclub: The Stage at The Star.

=== Bowling ===
The pro shop at Starlight Bowling Center is managed by DeeRonn Booker, winner of the 2024 USBC Masters bowling tournament.

== Recognition and awards ==
2008, 2009: New Mexico’s Top Ten Best Places to Work, New Mexico Business Weekly. 2013, 2014, 2015, 2016, 2017, 2018: Albuquerque's top 5 Top Workplaces, Albuquerque Journal

== See also ==
- List of casinos in New Mexico
