= Beatrix Pesek =

Hungarian ten-pin bowler

Beatrix Pesek is a Hungarian ten-pin bowler. She finished in 24th position of the combined rankings at the 2006 AMF World Cup.

== See also ==
- Glossary of bowling
- List of ten-pin bowlers
- List of world bowling champions
