= Hiromi Matsunaga =

Japanese ten-pin bowling player

Personal information
- Native name: Kanji: 松永裕美; Spaced hiragana: まつなが ひろみ
- Born: June 5, 1984 (age 42)
- Height: 1.53 m (5 ft 0 in)

Bowling Information
- Affiliation: JPBA
- License no.: 384, Class 37
- Rookie year: 2004
- Dominant hand: Right
- Wins: 9
- 300-games: 3
- High series: 838 (300, 280, 258)
- Sponsors: ABS

Hiromi Matsunaga (松永 裕美, Matsunaga Hiromi; born June 5, 1984) is a Japanese female professional ten-pin bowler. She is a member of the Japan Professional Bowling Association, license no. 384.

== Major accomplishments ==
- 2006 - Pro Bowling Women vs Rookies (2nd place)
- 2007 - G Japan Championship (4th place)
- 2007 - G ROUND1 Cup Ladies (3rd place)
- 2008 - DHC Cup Girls Bowling International (4th place)
- 2009 - Salad Bowl Cup (2nd place)
- 2009 - JFE Cup Chiba Women's Open (winner)
- 2009 - 29th Kobe Bowling Pro-Am Festival (winner)
- 2009 - 41st All Japan Women's Pro Bowling Championships (winner)
- 2009 - Gunma Open Women (2nd place)
- 2009 - 33rd ABS Japan Open (3rd place)
- 2009 - BIGBOX Higashi Yamato Cup (2nd place)
- 2010 - 42nd HANDA CUP (winner)
- 2010 - 5th MK Charity Cup (2nd place)
- 2010 - ROUND1 Cup Ladies 2010 (winner)
- 2010 - Gunma Open (winner)
- 2011 - 43rd All Japan Women's Pro Bowling Championships (winner)
- 2011 - 33rd Kansai Women's Open (winner)
- 2011 - Miyazaki Open Pro-Am (2nd place)
- 2011 - 27th Rokko Queens Open (winner)
- 2012 - Chiba Women's Open (3rd place)
- 2013 - Chiba Women's Open (2nd place)

DHC Tour

- DHC Ladies Bowling Tour 2006/2007 - 5th leg (9th place)
- DHC Ladies Bowling Tour 2006/2007 - 6th leg (6th place)
- DHC Ladies Bowling Tour 2008 - 2nd leg (runner-up)
- DHC Ladies Bowling Tour 2008 - 4th leg (runner-up)
- DHC Ladies Bowling Tour 2009 - 2nd leg (3rd place)

P★League

- P★League - Tournament 9 (2nd place)
- P★League - Tournament 10 (2nd place)
- P★League - Tournament 17 (3rd place)
- P★League - Tournament 18 (winner)
- P★League - Tournament 19 (winner)
- P★League - Tournament 21 (winner)
- P★League - Tournament 25 (3rd place)
- P★League - Tournament 29 (winner)
- P★League - Tournament 30 (winner)
- P★League - Tournament 31 (winner)
- P★League - Tournament 32 (winner)
- P★League - Tournament 35 (3rd place)
- P★League - Tournament 37 (winner)
