= Melody Yeung =

Hong Kong ten-pin bowler (born 1960/1961)

- Traditional Chinese: 楊嘉玲
- Simplified Chinese: 杨嘉玲
Transcriptions
Standard Mandarin
- Hanyu Pinyin: Yáng Jiālíng
Yue: Cantonese
- Jyutping: Joeng^{4} Gaa^{1}ling^{4}

Melody Yeung Ka Ling (traditional Chinese: 楊嘉玲; simplified Chinese: 杨嘉玲; born 1960 or 1961) is a ten-pin bowler from Hong Kong.

== Biography ==
Born in 1960 or 1961, Yeung was a sales clerk in 1987. In November of that year, Yeung came in sixth place at the QubicaAMF Bowling World Cup in Kuala Lumpur. After receiving 1,440 points which was three points shy of the requirement to advance, the South China Morning Post said, "The Hongkong girl was prominent at all stages of the competition at all stages of the competition but failed by a whisker at the last gasp." She won the women's competition at the San Miguel Hongkong Open that month after having won the previous edition of the competition. Norideen Kitchell of the South China Morning Post, wrote in 1987, "Melody Yeung, who together with [Cat] Che is considered Hongkong's two most outstanding woman bowlers."

In August 1988, Yeung received an international competitions ban until the end of 1989 from the Hong Kong Tenpin Bowling Congress. It was levied after she had not received approval before agreeing to talk to a television station while competing at the FIQ Asian Amateur Championships, where had received a gold medal. Despite the ban, she competed in September 1988 at the Kwai Fong Bowling Centre, where she secured a contestant slot at the Bowling World Cup. The South China Morning Post said that with her performance, Yeung "again proved she is the best woman bowler in the territory with a nine-game score of 1,862, including a 120 points bonus, to earn the top seed position for the step-ladder final".

In 1994, she received a gold medal at the Hong Kong Open's women's master competition. Later that year, after competing in 16 games, she received 2,992 points and placed sixth during the bowling women's master's event at the Asian Games. While riding a taxi with three other bowlers in May 1995, she "lost a lower front tooth" when the vehicle was hit head-on by another car on Stubbs Road. In the mid-1990s, she completed her tenure on the Hong Kong national bowling team. She competed in 1999 at the Asian Tour women's master's cup event. Yeung made it to the Mei Foo Super Fun Bowl semifinals where Wu Yu-ling, who represented the Chinese Taipei team, defeated her 213–199.
