= Hiroko Shimizu =

Japanese professional bowler

Personal information
- Native name: Kanji: 清水弘子; Spaced hiragana: しみず ひろこ
- Born: March 15, 1977 (age 49)
- Height: 1.58 m (5 ft 2 in)

Bowling Information
- Affiliation: LBO
- License no.: 1, Class 1
- Rookie year: 2010
- Dominant hand: Left
- Wins: 8
- 300-games: 1

Hiroko Shimizu (清水 弘子, Shimizu Hiroko; born March 15, 1977) is a Japanese female professional ten-pin bowler. She is a member of the Ladies Bowling Organization of Japan, license no. 1. In April 2010, Shimizu officially resigned from the Japan Professional Bowling Association (JPBA), and joined the LBO. She currently holds the office of vice-chairperson with the LBO.

== Major accomplishments ==
- 2005 - 21st Rokko Queens (winner)
- 2006 - Miyazaki Pro/Amateur Open (winner)
- 2006 - BIGBOX Higashiyamato Cup (winner)
- 2006 - 38th Japan National Championships (winner)
- 2007 - Gunma Open (winner)
- 2008 - Chiba Women's Open (winner)
- 2008 - Karuizawa Prince Cup (winner)
- 2008 - Tokai Women's Open (winner)

DHC Tour

- DHC Ladies Bowling Tour 2006 - 6th leg (winner)
- DHC Ladies Bowling Tour 2006/2007 - 1st leg (winner)
- DHC Ladies Bowling Tour 2006/2007 - 4th leg (winner)

P★League

- P★League - Tournament 6 (winner)
- P★League - Tournament 8 (winner)
- P★League - Tournament 15 (winner)
