= John Jowdy =

American ten pin bowling coach

John Jowdy (1920-2013) was an American ten pin bowling coach and author famous for developing the free armswing. He lived in El Cajon, California.

== Early life ==
Jowdy was born on April 11, 1920 to Madeline and Fred Jowdy, the third of nine children.

== Coaching career ==
Before Jowdy started coaching, he ran several business ventures including the Tiffany Lounge in Houston Street, San Antonio.

Jowdy's coaching career began in 1940, when he started teaching youth bowlers. By 1948, he had begun coaching professionals.

From 1962 onwards, Jowdy was employed by bowling ball manufacturer Columbia Industries as a consultant.

Since the 80s, Columbia has sponsored John Jowdy scholarships for aspiring college bowlers.

From 2007-13, Jowdy worked for Ebonite International after they took over Columbia 300.

== Technique ==
Jowdy made many contributions to the sport of bowling during his career of over 70 years, but the most notable was the free armswing used by the majority of contemporary professional bowlers. In his book Bowling Execution, he emphasized the importance of synchronizing the pushback, swing and hand rotation with the four or five steps to the line. Jowdy compared the ideal release of a bowling ball to landing an airplane, with emphasis on accuracy and smooth descent onto the lane while at the same time rotating the hand from the 6 o'clock to the 3 o'clock position.

== Personal life ==
Jowdy married his first wife Vee Rizzo in 1941.

Jowdy died in San Antonio on August 1, 2013 and was survived by his second wife Brenda, five children, 10 grandchildren, and five great-grandchildren. Friends remembered him not only for his expertise in bowling, but also for his fondness for cigars and his sense of humor.

== Honours ==
Jowdy was inducted into the Professional Bowlers Association Hall of Fame in 1988.

In 1996, Jowdy became president of the Bowling Writers of America Association.

In 2001, Jowdy was inducted into the American Bowling Congress Hall of Fame.

On his 90th birthday in 2010, he was inducted into the Bowling Coaches' Hall of Fame.

== Select bibliography ==
- Bowling Execution, 2009 (Human Kinetics Publishing)
