= Yūka Sasaki =

Japanese bowler

Personal information
- Native name: Kanji: 佐々木優香; Spaced hiragana: ささき ゆうか
- Born: February 16, 1987 (age 39)
- Height: 1.60 m (5 ft 3 in)

Bowling Information
- Affiliation: LBO
- License no.: ?, Class 1
- Rookie year: 2010
- Dominant hand: Right
- 300-games: 1
- Sponsors: DHC

Yūka Sasaki (佐々木 優香, Sasaki Yūka; born February 16, 1987) is a Japanese female professional ten-pin bowler. She is a member of the Ladies Bowling Organization of Japan.

== Major accomplishments ==
DHC

- DHC Ladies Bowling Tour 2007/08 - 1st leg (22nd place)
- DHC Ladies Bowling Tour 2007/08 - 2nd leg (19th place)
- DHC Ladies Bowling Tour 2007/08 - 3rd leg (17th place)
