= Pešek =

Pešek (feminine: Pešková) is a Czech surname. It was probably derived from the given name Petr, but there is also a theory that it was derived from the Czech word pešek (meaning 'baton'). Notable people with the surname include:

- Daniela Pešková (born 1984), Slovak sport shooter
- Eliška Pešková (1833–1895), Czech actress and playwright
- Jakub Pešek (born 1993), Czech footballer
- Jiří Pešek (1927–2011), Czech footballer
- Josef Pešek, Czech ice dancer
- Karel Pešek (1895–1970), Czech football and ice hockey player
- Karel Pešek (motorcyclist) (born 1992), Czech motorcycle racer
- Ladislav Pešek (1906–1986), Czech actor
- Libor Pešek (1933–2022), Czech conductor
- Luděk Pešek (1919–1999), Czech artist and novelist
- Lukáš Pešek (born 1985), Czech motorcycle racer
- Vlasta Pešková (born 1938), Czech athlete
