= Miki Nishimura =

Personal information
- Native name: Kanji: 西村美紀; Spaced hiragana: にしむら みき
- Born: July 2, 1985 (age 41)
- Height: 1.62 m (5 ft 4 in)

Bowling Information
- Affiliation: JPBA
- License no.: 408, Class 38
- Rookie year: 2005
- Dominant hand: Right
- Wins: 1
- 300-games: 1
- Sponsors: DHC

Miki Nishimura (西村 美紀, Nishimura Miki; born July 2, 1985) is a Japanese female professional ten-pin bowler. She is a member of the Japan Professional Bowling Association, license no. 408.

At the end of the 2012 JPBA season, Nishimura was ranked second place in total points (only behind Hiromi Matsunaga.)

Nishimura is best known for her extremely high back swing and rolling the ball in-between the X and Y axis. Her recent accomplishments include appearing in the 2012 International Bowling Championships 2013 supported by DHC, bowling in a Baker-style exhibition match with a team of women from Japan, against a team of PBA Tour professionals, including Chris Barnes and Mike Fagan. The Japan women lost to the PBA Tour professionals 278-174.

== Biography ==
Nishimura's father is Kunihiko Nishimura (西村邦彦), who is also a professional bowler.

== Major accomplishments ==
- 2006 - Rokko Queens (3rd place)
- 2007 - Karuizawa Prince Cup (winner)
- 2008 - Karuizawa Prince Cup (4th place)
- 2008 - Rookie Battle (2nd place)
- 2010 - 27th Rokko Queens (4th place)
- 2010 - 6th MK Charity Cup (4th place)
- 2010 - Tokai Women's Open (4th place)
- 2011 - 28th Rokko Queens (5th place)

P-League

- Tournament 19 - 3rd place
- Tournament 26 - winner
- Tournament 29 - 3rd place
- Tournament 30 - 2nd place
- Tournament 33 - 2nd place
- Tournament 35 - 2nd place
- Tournament 36 - winner
- Tournament 37 - 2nd place
- Tournament 38 - winner

Nishimura-pro currently holds the P-League record with seven straight semi-final match appearances.
