= Ritsuko Nakayama =

Japanese professional bowler (1942–2026)

Personal information
- Native name: Kanji: 中山律子; Spaced hiragana: なかやま りつこ
- Born: October 12, 1942 Kusatsu, Gunma, Japan
- Died: November 7, 2026 (aged 84)
- Height: 1.62 m (5 ft 4 in)

Bowling Information
- Affiliation: JPBA
- License no.: 2, Class 1
- Rookie year: 1969
- Dominant hand: Right
- Wins: 33
- 300-games: 2
- High series: 824 (268, 257, 299)

Ritsuko Nakayama (中山 律子, Nakayama Ritsuko; October 12, 1942 – November 7, 2026) was a Japanese professional bowler.

== Biography ==
Ritsuko Nakayama was born in Kusatsu, Gunma, on October 12, 1942. She later moved to Kagoshima which was her parents' hometown. Nakayama became a member of the Japan Professional Bowling Association in 1969, representing Tokyo Tower Bowling Center.

During her professional bowling career, Nakayama accumulated 33 wins. She attained the number-one rank among JPBA female bowlers in 1969 (avg. 197.6) and 1970 (avg. 199.2), and was ranked among the top-three from 1969 to 1973.

On August 21, 1970, Nakayama rolled a perfect 300 game on Japanese national television, becoming the first woman ever to perform the feat in any television market. (It took nearly 27 years before Michelle Feldman rolled the first American television 300-game in 1997.) She rolled the game during a tournament match, aired on the bowling show Ladies Challenge Bowl (October 1969 to March 1975,) at Fuchū Star Lanes. By the end of 1970, she earned the Japan Professional Sports Award for outstanding achievement.

Because of her 300-game, Nakayama became very famous in Japan, and would eventually boost the sport of bowling. In 1970, she appeared in a shampoo commercial, and also had a song written about her, titled Sawayaka Ritsuko-san (さわやか律子さん). She was a guest judge for the 21st NHK Kōhaku Uta Gassen (1970), as well as a guest presenter for the 13th Japan Record Awards (1971). In 1971, TBS aired the Japanese television drama Beautiful Challenger, the storyline covering an office lady who joins the company bowling club and competes with other clubs. Both Nakayama, as well as Rie Ishii appeared in the drama series as themselves.

Nakayama also held a female world's record for a three-game series of 824 (268, 257 and 299), setting the record on July 15, 1971.

Nakayama's arch rival was Kayoko Suda (須田開代子).

In 1990, Nakayama was forced to retire from bowling full-time, due to injury to her right shoulder and left knee (her sliding leg). Still, in 1994, she was able to place 4th in The Prince Cup. 1994 was also the year Nakayama celebrated her 25th anniversary as a professional.

After retirement, she was very involved in the operations side of bowling in Japan. Nakayama was president of the JPBA until 2012. She was a co-founder and president of the Japan Ladies Bowling Club (JLBC) - an organization she and Suda created. She was also vice-president of the Bowling Council of Japan (BCJ.) She was also a co-founder of P★League, along with the JPBA and JBC.

Nakayama died on November 7, 2026, aged 84.
