= Takashi Maruyama =

Japanese volleyball player (born 1953)

Personal information
- Nationality: Japanese
- Born: 28 January 1953 (age 72); Tokyo, Japan

Sport
- Sport: Volleyball

Takashi Maruyama (丸山 孝, Maruyama Takashi; born 28 January 1953) is a Japanese volleyball player. He competed in the men's tournament at the 1976 Summer Olympics.
