= Akiko Tanigawa =

Japanese professional bowler

Personal information
- Native name: Kanji: 谷川章子; Furigana: たにがわ あきこ
- Born: October 25, 1977 (age 49)
- Height: 1.66 m (5 ft 5 1/2 in)

Bowling Information
- Affiliation: JPBA
- License no.: 389, Class 37
- Rookie year: 2004
- Dominant hand: Right
- Wins: 6
- 300-games: 6
- Sponsors: Storm

Akiko Tanigawa (谷川 章子, Tanigawa Akiko; born October 25, 1977) is a Japanese female professional ten-pin bowler. She is a member of the Japan Professional Bowling Association, license no. 389. She is currently a member of the Storm Products team.

== Major accomplishments ==
- 2006 – Tokai Women's Open (winner)
- 2006 – Ladies vs. Rookies (winner)
- 2007 – 29th Eagle Classic (winner)
- 2008 – Gunma Open (winner)
- 2019 – LJBC Prince Cup (winner)

DHC

- DHC Ladies Bowling Tour 2005/06 – final leg (winner)

P★League

- Tournament 10 – winner
