= Gary Faulkner Jr. =

American ten-pin bowler

Personal information
- Born: October 18, 1990 (age 35)

Bowling Information
- Affiliation: PBA
- Dominant hand: Left
- Wins: 1 (major)
- 300-games: 4
- High series: 879
- Sponsors: Storm

Gary Faulkner Jr. (born October 18, 1990) is an American ten-pin bowler from Memphis, Tennessee. He competes on the PBA Tour after having been a member of Junior Team USA. He won his first major PBA title in 2015.

== Background ==
Faulkner grew up in Whitehaven and Germantown (in and near Memphis, Tennessee) and is a 2009 graduate of Germantown High School. He learned to bowl at Winchester Bowl and the Strike Zone Bowling Lanes in Memphis, where he earned the nickname “300”. His father, Gary Faulkner Sr., is pastor at Cummings Street Missionary Baptist Church in Southeast Memphis.

== Amateur career ==
Faulkner entered the TNBA (The National Bowling Association) Junior Bowling Program at age 5, eventually mentoring other youth bowlers. He won the Junior Gold Championship in 2011 and earned a spot on Junior Team USA. He attended Webber International University, where in 2012 he anchored the men's team to Intercollegiate Team Championship win, and was 2013 ITC men's most valuable player. He is a TNBA Veronica L. Green Junior Singles Scratch Tournament Masters titlist.

== Professional bowling career ==
Faulkner joined the PBA in 2013, and, in his first professional television appearance, in 2015 he won a major title at the Rolltech PBA World Championship. In 2016 he finished ninth in the PBA Xtra Frame Lubbock Sports Open.

Faulkner became the second PBA Tour African-American champion, after now-retired five-time tour winner George Branham III. In recognition, Tennessee Representative Steve Cohen invited Faulkner to bowl at the White House, where on March 4, 2016 he bowled on the lanes beneath the adjacent Eisenhower Executive Office Building with some members of his family, of Cohen's staff, of White House staff, and Cohen himself.

=== Recognition from the United States Congress ===
CONGRESSIONAL RECORD — February 4, 2016

Recognizing and Congratulating Gary Faulkner, Jr. for Winning the 2015 Rolltech Professional Bowlers Association World Championship

Hon. Steve Cohen of Tennessee in the House of Representatives

Mr. COHEN. Mr. Speaker, I rise today to recognize and congratulate Gary Faulkner, Jr. of Memphis, Tennessee for winning the 2015 Rolltech Professional Bowlers Association World Championship at the National Bowling Stadium in Reno, Nevada. In his first professional television appearance, Gary Faulkner beat top qualifier EJ Tackett to become the second African American ever to win a PBA Tour title in the PBA's 57-year history after George Branham III won the Brunswick Memorial World Open in 1986.

Gary learned the game of bowling at the early age of two when he bowled with his father, Pastor Gary Faulkner, Sr. of Cummings Street Baptist Church. As a sophomore at Germantown High School, Gary won the Division I Bowling Championship title in the Tennessee Secondary School Athletic Association individual bowling tournament. At that time, his best series bowling score was 833. While enrolled at Webber International University, Gary helped lead his team to the 2012 Intercollegiate Team Championship.

Gary Faulkner maintained his focus and determination to win the Rolltech Championship. ...

With a goal set in mind to win, Gary Faulkner has represented his family and the city of Memphis well, and I look forward to reading about his future accomplishments. Mr. Speaker, I ask all of my colleagues to join me in congratulating Gary Faulkner, Jr. on winning the 2015 Rolltech Professional Bowlers Association World Championship.

=== PBA Tour wins ===
1. 2015 – Rolltech PBA World Championship (Reno, Nevada)

== Personal ==
Faulkner has a bachelor's degree in computer information systems from Webber International University, and enjoys computer programming, working out, and basketball.
