= Mika Sakai =

Japanese Professional Ten-pin bowler

Personal information
- Native name: Kanji: 酒井美佳; Spaced hiragana: さかい みか
- Born: March 7, 1975 (age 51) Osaka, Japan
- Height: 1.65 m (5 ft 5 in)

Bowling Information
- Affiliation: JPBA
- License no.: 268, Class 25
- Rookie year: 1992
- Dominant hand: Right
- Wins: 3
- 300-games: 1
- Video of form
- Sponsors: DHC

Mika Sakai (酒井 美佳, Sakai Mika; born March 7, 1975) is a Japanese female professional ten-pin bowler. She is a member of the Japan Professional Bowling Association, license no. 268.

Sakai comes from a bowling family. Her father is Takeo Sakai, also a professional bowler in Japan. He is the last JPBA member to win the Round1 Japan Cup, doing so in 1988. Her younger sister is Reika Sakai, who as sisters competed in P-League.

== Biography ==
Sakai first started bowling while in elementary school. During the second grade of junior high-school, her father won the first All-Japan Championship. It was this event that inspired her to become a professional bowler. She frequented the bowling establishments every day, practicing after school while being coached by her father. She became a professional in 1992 at the age of 17, just missing out on breaking the record for being the youngest to become a professional in the JPBA (16). The Sakais also became the first parent/child duo to be active professional bowlers at the same time.

In 2002, father and daughter formed a doubles team, and won the All-Japan Mixed Doubles tournament. In the same year, Sakai won the Tokai Women's Open. In 2006, Sakai became a part of the first Bowling Revolution P★League tournament.

== Major accomplishments ==
- 2002 - All-Japan Mixed Doubles (winner, along with her dad)
- 2002 - Tokai Women's Open (winner)
- 2003 - Eagle Classic (2nd place)
- 2005 - DHC Ladies Bowling Tour, 2005 season, 1st leg (winner)
- 2006 - Miyazaki Professional/Amateur Open (3rd place, 300-game)
- 2006 - JLBC Prince Cup (2nd place)
- 2007 - Rokko Queen's Open (8th place)
- 2012 - 32nd All-Japan Open Mixed Doubles (winner, along with Kyung-sin Park)

P★League

- Tournament 7 - 3rd place
- Tournament 11 - 2nd place
- Tournament 26 - 2nd place
- Tournament 34 - 2nd place
- Tournament 38 - 3rd place
- Personal records: nine strikes in a row, high game 279

Sakai-pro currently holds the P-League record for high three-game series of 789 (275-257-257). She also ties with other bowlers for the most strikes in a single game (11).
