= Aino Kinjō =

Personal information
- Native name: Kanji: 金城愛乃; Spaced hiragana: きんじょう あいの
- Born: August 29, 1974 (age 51)
- Height: 1.64 m (5 ft 4 1/2 in)

Bowling Information
- Affiliation: JPBA
- License no.: 284, Class 27
- Rookie year: 1994
- Dominant hand: Right
- Wins: 4
- 300-games: 3

Aino Kinjō (金城 愛乃, Kinjō Aino; born August 29, 1974) is a Japanese female professional ten-pin bowler. She is a member of the Japan Professional Bowling Association, license no. 284. On P-League, her nickname was "Bowling Queen of Okinawa."

== Biography ==
Kinjō was first introduced to bowling when she was in junior high, when her parents invited her to go bowling with them. Later, under the influence of her brother, a national player, she began to pursue bowling. After entering high school and receiving professional coaching, she began to participate in the national Fukuoka and Ishikawa teams.

After her high school graduation she took the pro test, but failed the secondary exam. She took a part-time job at the Fukuoka bowling alley to practice until she could take the test again the following year.

After turning pro, she was named overall ladies champion in her debut year. As of March 2009, she has four wins (two of which are recognized as "perfect" wins).

== Major accomplishments ==
- 1994 - Ladies vs. Rookies (winner)
- 1999 - 31st All-Japan Women's Pro Bowling Championship (2nd place)
- 2001 - Otsu Prince Cup (winner)
- 2003 - Karuizawa Prince Cup (winner)
- 2008 - 3rd International Bowl Open (Pro division) (winner)
- 2009 - 41st All-Japan Women's Pro Bowling Championship (2nd place)
- 2011 - 34th JLBC Queens Open (6th place)
- 2011 - Tokai Women's Open (3rd place)

DHC Ladies Bowling Tour

- 2007 - 1st-leg (winner), Kansai Open (4th place)
