= Aki Nawa =

Japanese professional ten-pin bowler

Personal information
- Native name: Kanji: 名和秋; Spaced hiragana: なわ あき
- Born: November 15, 1979 (age 46)
- Height: 1.63 m (5 ft 4 in)

Bowling Information
- Affiliation: JPBA
- License no.: 365, Class 35
- Rookie year: 2002
- Dominant hand: Right
- Wins: 1
- 300-games: 2
- Video of form

Aki Nawa (名和 秋, Nawa Aki; born November 15, 1979) is a Japanese female professional ten-pin bowler. She is a member of the Japan Professional Bowling Association, license no. 365. Although Nawa bowls right-handed, she writes and uses chopsticks left-handed. Nawa-pro was plagued with a right elbow injury between 2010 and 2012. She is managed by SUNNY SIDE UP.

== Major accomplishments ==
- 2003 - Japan National Championships (4th place)
- 2004 - Ladies vs. Rookies (winner)
- 2005 - Eagle Classic (8th place)
- 2006 - Japan National Championships (3rd place)
- 2006 - Miyazaki Open Pro-Am (6th place)
- 2006 - BIGBOX Higashi Yamato Cup (5th place)
- 2006 - All Japan Mixed Doubles (7th place)
- 2006 - 38th All Japan Championship (3rd place)
- 2010 - ROUND1 Cup Ladies (10th place)
- 2012 - Miyazaki Open Pro-Am (7th place)

P★League

- Tournament 2 - winner
- Tournament 3 - 2nd place
- Tournament 6 - 3rd place
- Tournament 9 - 3rd place
- Tournament 13 - 2nd place
- Tournament 31 - 3rd place
- Personal records: nine strikes in a row, high game 279
