= George Branham III =

American ten-pin bowler

Personal information
- Born: November 21, 1962 (age 63) Detroit, Michigan, U.S.
- Years active: 1983–2003

Bowling Information
- Affiliation: PBA
- Rookie year: 1986
- Dominant hand: Right (cranker delivery)
- Wins: 5 PBA Tour (1 major)
- 300-games: 23

George Branham III (born November 21, 1962) is an American professional ten-pin bowler and former member of the Professional Bowlers Association (PBA). He began his career in 1984 and retired at the end of the 2003 season. His career is most noted because he was the first African American to win a PBA Tour title and later became the first to win a major championship, which he accomplished at the 1993 Tournament of Champions. He had been the only African American to win a PBA Tour title until Gary Faulkner Jr. won the PBA World Championship in December 2015.

In January, 2025, Branham was elected to the PBA Hall of Fame in the Pioneer category. He was inducted in April with the rest of the 2025 class.

== Bowling career ==
Branham started bowling at the young age of six when his father introduced the sport to him. His first real accomplishment as a bowler came when he won the Southern California Junior Bowler of the year tournament in 1983. The following year in 1984 Branham joined the PBA tour where he was runner-up in rookie of the year voting. His first success came on November 22, 1986, at the Brunswick Memorial World open in Chicago, Illinois, where he defeated Mark Roth 195–191 and earned a purse of $33,260. His next title came at the 1987 AC-Delco Classic, where he climbed from the #5 seed and had to defeat two future PBA Hall of Famers (Mike Aulby and Norm Duke) before defeating Steve Wunderlich 225–182 in the championship match for the $27,000 winner's share. Branham set a PBA record by winning his first eight TV finals matches, which still stands today.

After a four-year stretch of little success, Branham found himself in the final match at the 1991 ABC Masters, where he faced Doug Kent. The match ended in a 236–236 tie, sending it to a 9th/10th frame roll-off. Branham managed just 28 pins in the roll-off, to Kent's 50 pins, and had to settle for second place. He finally returned to the winner's circle in 1993 at the Baltimore Open, crediting the victory over Brian Voss to a tip from then-tour roommate Randy Pedersen.

The Baltimore Open title re-qualified Branham for the 1993 Firestone Tournament of Champions in Fairlawn, Ohio, and he took full advantage. This annual invitational tournament is considered by PBA insiders to be the most prestigious of all PBA majors, because the starting field includes only PBA title winners. Branham secured the top seed in qualifying, and his victory over Parker Bohn III in the title match by a score of 227–214 earned him a $60,000 first prize.

Following this tournament, Branham only won one more title in 1996 before his retirement at the end of the 2003 season. He finished his PBA career with five national titles. His total PBA Tour earnings topped out at $747,138. Branham recorded a total of 23 perfect 300 games in PBA events, including back-to-back 300 games during qualifying at the 1995 Peoria Open.

In 2025, George was elected to the PBA Hall of Fame in the Pioneer category.

== PBA Titles ==
Major championships in bold.

| Year | Title |
|---|---|
| 1986 | Brunswick Memorial World Open |
| 1987 | AC-Delco Classic |
| 1993 | Baltimore Open |
| 1993 | **Firestone Tournament of Champions** |
| 1996 | Cleveland Open |

== Personal life ==
Though Branham was born in Detroit, he grew up in Southern California with his two older sisters and one younger brother. After retiring, George began a new career in sales with Pepsi in Indianapolis, where he now lives.
