= Yūki Akiyoshi =

Japanese ten-pin bowling player

Personal information
- Native name: Kanji: 秋吉夕紀; Spaced hiragana: あきよし ゆうき
- Born: October 2, 1985 (age 40)
- Height: 1.58 m (5 ft 2 in)

Bowling Information
- Affiliation: LBO
- License no.: ?, Class 1
- Rookie year: 2010
- Dominant hand: Right
- High game: 300
- Sponsors: DHC

Yūki Akiyoshi (秋吉 夕紀, Akiyoshi Yūki; born October 2, 1985) is a Japanese female professional ten-pin bowler. She is a member of the Ladies Bowling Organization of Japan.

== Major accomplishments ==
- 2008 - All-Japan University Individual Championships (3rd place)

DHC

- DHC Ladies Bowling Tour 2007/08 - 2nd leg (5th place)
- DHC Cup Girls Team Challenge (5th place)
- DHC Ladies Bowling Tour 2007/08 - 3rd leg (4th place)
