= Japan Professional Bowling Association =

Japanese bowling sanctioning body

- Abbreviation: JPBA
- Formation: 1967
- Purpose: Professional sport for ten-pin bowling in Japan, governing body is JBC
- Headquarters: Tokyo, Japan
- Region served: Japan
- Members: Mainly Japanese nationals, but also includes professionals from other countries.
- President: Hideki Matsuda (松田 秀樹)
- Website: http://www.jpba.or.jp/

The Japan Professional Bowling Association (日本プロボウリング協会, Nippon Puro Bōringu Kyōkai) (JPBA) is the major sanctioning body for the sport of professional ten-pin bowling in Japan. The organization was founded by Masaaki Ishikawa (石川雅章, Ishikawa Masaaki), and was established on January 27, 1967. The JPBA sanctions tournaments and other functions related to professional bowling for both men and women. Its headquarters are located in Tokyo. The current president of the JPBA is Hideki Matsuda.

The Japan Ladies Bowling Club is a sub-organization within the JPBA system, and sponsors women-only tournaments. The JLBC was co-founded by Ritsuko Nakayama and Kayoko Suda.

== Pro test ==
Professional bowling in Japan is a licensed profession, very much like passing the bar exam for attorneys or getting a CPA to become an accountant. To become a licensed bowling professional, the candidate must pass a series of skill exams, referred to as the "pro test".

The candidate needs to apply for the pro test. The application is available at the JPBA web site. Applicants must be 16 by the day before the 1st exam is held, and need two referrals from active (at least 30 games per year) pro bowlers who meet the average requirement of 190 (180 for women) and have been in the JPBA for at least five years. Once the application has been accepted and the 100,000¥ application fee is paid, the candidate will be assigned a number, and then added to the pro test schedule. The pro test is held simultaneously in two regions within Japan: west and east. The region is determined based on the candidate's home prefecture.

The pro test is held every April to May. The pro test is broken into three parts: 1st exam, 2nd exam, and 3rd exam. The 1st and 2nd exams are to test the candidate's bowling skills. Each of the two exams consist of four days at 15 games (12 games for women) per day. All candidates participate in the 1st exam, which is held locally in both the east and west. In the 1st exam, the candidate needs to maintain a 190 average (180 for women) for the first 30 games (24 games for women) to be allowed to continue to the third and fourth days. The candidate then needs to average a 200 (190 for women) for the first 60 games (48 games for women) in order to be allowed to continue to the 2nd exam. The 2nd exam takes place in both west and east Japan, which requires bowlers to travel. At the end of the 2nd exam, the candidate needs to maintain a 200 average for 120 games (96 games and a 190 average for women) in order to be allowed continue to the 3rd exam. Both exams move bowling alleys every day, meaning a successful candidate to the 3rd exam would have bowled in 8 different alleys.

The 3rd exam is a written exam and interview, where the candidate demonstrates bowling and procedure knowledge. The questions are scored, and the candidate needs to pass with a score of 60 or better.

Once all the exams are completed successfully, the candidate receives his bowling professional license. Entry into the association requires a ¥50,000 payment, while annual dues are ¥70,000.

== Emblem ==
All licensed professionals belonging to the JPBA must wear the JPBA emblem on their bowling shirts when they make public appearances. The emblem is highly regarded in Japan as a symbol of professional bowling. The emblem has been used as props in Japanese television dramas such as Beautiful Challenger (1971) and Golden Bowl (2002).

The emblem displays the classification of a professional. There are two varieties of the emblem. All new members receive the General Class license patch (通常ワッペン) (see image above.) Before 2008, if a member has averaged 200 or better for 200 games in competition (190 or better for 200 games for women professionals) for five years in a row, he receives a gold-lined version of the insignia, referred to as the Class A permanent license patch (永久A級ライセンスワッペン). From 2008, the average requirement was raised to 210 for men and 200 for women. In 2011, bowlers who are recognized as seeded (top 48 for men and top 18 for women in point ranking or through tournaments which guarantee a seed berth) for five years in a row may also become Class A. As of 2013, 97 men and 90 women are classified as Class A professionals.

== JPBA sanctioned tournaments ==
- ROUND1 Japan Cup - JPBA and PBA sanctioned annual event.
- ABS Japan Open Bowling Championship
- HANDA CUP All Japan Women's Pro Bowling Championship
- HANDA CUP Philanthropy
- MK Charity Cup
- Hiroshima Open Bowling Tournament
- JLBC PRINCE CUP (women)
- ROUND1 Cup Ladies (women)
- Miyazaki Pro-Am (women)
- Kansai Open (women)
- JFE Chiba Cup Women's Open (women)

== JPBA events ==
- Bowling Revolution P-League - Weekly made-for-TV series of tournaments for select women.
- Select members of P-League also participate in the Japanese TV variety show Honoo-no Taiiku-kai TV (炎の体育会TV) in a split making competition with various Japanese tarento.

== Notable JPBA members ==
As of July 1, 2013, the JPBA membership is made up of 810 males and 309 females, as well as 11 teaching professionals.

Male

- Hiroto Kimura (木村広人)
- Isao Yamamoto (山本勲)
- Masayuki Koyama (小山雅之)
- Nobuaki Takahashi (高橋延明)
- Ryōta Ichihara (市原竜太)
- Takeo Sakai (酒井武雄)
- Shigenori Sakata (坂田重徳)
- Shota Kawazoe (川添奨太)
- Yoshiki Ōsawa (大澤義樹)
- Subaru Nagano (永野すばる)

Female

- Aino Kinjō
- Aki Nawa
- Akiko Tanigawa
- Ayumi Kobayashi
- Hiromi Matsunaga
- Katsuko Sugimoto (two-time USBC Queens champion, 1981 and 1982)
- Kazue Inahashi (USBC Queens champion, 1984)
- Masami Abe (阿部聖水)
- Masami Hasegawa (長谷川真実)
- Mayumi Yoshida (吉田真由美)
- Mika Sakai
- Mika Satō (佐藤美香)
- Miki Nishimura
- Nachimi Itakura (37th AMF World Cup women's champion)
- Reika Sakai (酒井玲佳)
- Risa Suzuki (鈴木理沙)
- Ritsuko Nakayama
- Sanae Mori (森彩奈江)
- Shinobu Saitō (US Women's Open Champion, 1982)
- Suzuna Miyagi (宮城鈴菜)
- Urara Himeji (姫路麗)
- Wendy Macpherson
- Yachiyo Katō
- Yuki Yamamoto (山本由紀)
- Yukie Koyama (小山幸恵)
- Yūko Nakatani (中谷優子)
- Yurika Ōyama (大山由里香)
