= 2011–12 PBA Tour season =

PBA Bowling Tour: 2011–12 Season
- League: Professional Bowlers Association
- Sport: Ten-pin bowling
- Duration: November 4, 2011 – April 15, 2012

PBA Tour
- Season MVP: Sean Rash

PBA Tour seasons
- ← 2010–11 2012–13 →

This is a recap of the 2011–12 season for the Professional Bowlers Association (PBA) Tour. It is the tour's 53rd season, and the third straight season in which all of the first half events were condensed into the PBA World Series of Bowling (WSOB). The season consisted of 15 title events. This is also the final season in which the PBA is using an "exempt" player list. The "exempt" status for touring players will not be carried into the 2012–13 season.

Following the retirement of PBA Commissioner & CEO Fred Schreyer in October 2011, the PBA named Geoff Reiss as PBA CEO and promoted Deputy Commissioner Tom Clark to the role of PBA Commissioner.

== Tournament schedule and recaps ==
For the third season in a row, the PBA condensed the first half of the season into the PBA World Series of Bowling (WSOB). Preliminary rounds of the televised tournaments were November 5–16, with television tapings on November 17–20. All of the events were held at the South Point Casino's bowling center in Las Vegas, Nevada.

There were five "open" events at the World Series, meaning they were open to all PBA and World Tenpin Bowling Association (WTBA) members around the world. (To earn a PBA title at an event, however, the winner must be a full-fledged PBA member by the time of the WSOB.) The open events included four stand-alone title tournaments (Viper Open, Chameleon Open, Scorpion Open and Shark Open), plus the PBA World Championship. Each stand-alone "animal pattern" event featured 8 games of qualifying in the morning of each day, with the top 16 returning that evening for a best-of-five elimination match play round to determine the top four for the TV finals. The bowlers with the top 53 pinfall totals from the 32 qualifying round games in the four stand-alone events were entered into the "cashers' round" for the PBA World Championship. These 53 players then rolled 8 more games to determine the final 16 bowlers for the televised match play round of the World Championship.

There were three "exempt" events added to the 2011 WSOB. The Carmen Salvino Classic started with a field of up to 49 Lumber Liquidators PBA Tour exempt players, plus at least 15 Tour Qualifying Round (TQR) participants. Two other events, the Pepsi PBA Elite Players Championship and PBA Exempt Players Baker Doubles Championship were for PBA exempt bowlers only. The combined totals from 12 games of Carmen Salvino Classic and 18 games of Elite Players Championship qualifying determined the 16-player match play semifinals participants for both the Elite singles and Exempt doubles events.

An additional TV taping took place at the WSOB: the WTBA World Bowling Tour Finals, presented by the PBA. Qualifying for this final round was based on multiple WTBA international events, and did not take place at the WSOB. The finals format was a three-man and three-woman stepladder.

In all, 14 TV programs were taped at the 2011 World Series of Bowling: four stand-alone "animal pattern" finals, Carmen Salvino Classic finals, Pepsi PBA Elite Players Championship finals, PBA Exempt Players Baker Doubles Championship finals, WTBA World Bowling Tour men's final, WTBA World Bowling Tour women's final, and five days of broadcasts for the PBA World Championship finals. The TV finals were contested on specially-built lanes placed inside the South Point Casino's Exhibition Center.

The second half of the PBA Tour season included the three remaining majors (USBC Masters, Lumber Liquidators U.S. Open and PBA Tournament of Champions), plus four more title events.

=== World Series of Bowling (first-half) highlights ===
- Sean Rash made history by qualifying for the TV finals in the first five World Series of Bowling events. He made the four-player TV field for all four "oil pattern" events (Bayer Viper Open, Chameleon Open, Scorpion Open and GEICO Shark Open), and also earned the #1 seed in the PBA World Championship. However, he did not win any of these five tournaments.
- Osku Palermaa won his second PBA title and first major in the PBA World Championship, becoming the first two-handed bowler to win a major title on the PBA Tour.
- Stuart Williams won his first PBA title in the Bayer Viper Open. In doing so, he became the first player from England to win a title on the standard PBA Tour in North America. Shortly after, fellow Englishman Dom Barrett won the Scorpion Open at the same event.
- American players were completely shut out of singles titles at the WSOB. Only the doubles title by Norm Duke and Wes Malott prevented a complete sweep by international players.

=== Second-half highlights ===
- Mike Fagan defeated #1 seed Chris Barnes, 246–213, to win his first major title (and third overall) at the USBC Masters. Barnes, one of only six triple-crown winners in PBA history, was looking to add the Masters title to complete a career grand slam. It was the third time that Barnes qualified as the #1 seed in this tournament, but he has yet to win it.
- Fagan was the top seed for the third major of the season, the 69th U.S. Open, but he was knocked off by Pete Weber in the final match, 215–214. With the victory, Weber became the only player in PBA history to win five U.S. Open titles. Also at the 2012 U.S. Open, 14-year-old Kamron Doyle became the youngest person to ever cash in a PBA major. Doyle qualified 54th, making the 98-player cashers' round, and finished 61st.
- After failing to win in six 2011–12 TV finals appearances, Sean Rash finally won the richest tournament of the season, when he captured the title at the season-ending PBA Tournament of Champions. Rash also won the 2012 Chris Schenkel PBA Player of the Year award in a close vote (Rash received 29% of the vote to Jason Belmonte's 26.6%).
- This was the first time since the 1962 season that no left-hander has won a national PBA title.

=== Tournament summary ===
Below is a summary of the 2011–12 season. Total career PBA Tour titles for winners are shown in parentheses. All prize money is in US dollars ($), except where indicated.

Event	Airdate	City	Preliminary rounds	Final round	Oil pattern	Winner	Notes
PBA BowlersDeals.com All-In Showdown	Nov 4*	Las Vegas, NV	Nov 4	Live*		Tommy Jones	Optional $5,000 buy-in WSOB event. Not a PBA title event. $45,000 top prize.
GEICO World Bowling Tour Men's Final	Dec 4	Las Vegas, NV	Multiple dates	Nov 18	WBT Paris	Mika Koivuniemi (Finland)	WBT qualifiers only. Not a PBA title event.
GEICO World Bowling Tour Women's Final	Dec 4	Las Vegas, NV	Multiple dates	Nov 18		Carolyn Dorin-Ballard (USA)	WBT qualifiers only. Not a PBA title event.
PBA World Championship	Dec 11, 18 and Jan 1, 8, 15	Las Vegas, NV	Nov 5–9	Nov 17–18	Top seed chooses pattern (Scorpion)	Osku Palermaa (2)	Open event. $50,000 top prize.
WSOB Bayer Viper Open	Jan 22	Las Vegas, NV	Nov 5	Nov 18	Viper	Stuart Williams (1)	Open event. $15,000 top prize.
Cheetah Open	Jan 22*	Fountain Valley, CA	Jan 20–21	Live*	Cheetah	Eugene McCune (3)	Open event. $10,000 top prize.
Alka-Seltzer Plus Liquid Gels USBC Masters	Jan 29	Henderson, NV	Jan 23–28	Live	Custom	Mike Fagan (3)	Open to PBA and qualifying USBC members. $50,000 top prize.
Chris Paul PBA-Celebrity Invitational	Feb 5	Los Angeles, CA	n/a	Jan 12		Pete Weber, Blake Griffin and Jerry Ferrara	Invitational charity event.
WSOB Chameleon Open	Feb 12	Las Vegas, NV	Nov 6	Nov 19	Chameleon	Jason Belmonte (2)	Open event. $15,000 top prize.
WSOB Scorpion Open	Feb 19	Las Vegas, NV	Nov 7	Nov 19	Scorpion	Dom Barrett (1)	Open event. $15,000 top prize.
Ricart Ford Open	Feb 19*	Columbus, OH	Feb 17–18	Live*	Don Johnson	Scott Newell (1)	Open event. $10,000 top prize.
69th U.S. Open	Feb 26	North Brunswick, NJ	Feb 20–25	Live	U.S. Open (custom)	Pete Weber (36)	Open event. $60,000 top prize and automatic berth in the "Round of 36" at the PBA Tournament of Champions.
WSOB GEICO Shark Open	Mar 4	Las Vegas, NV	Nov 8	Nov 19	Shark	Jason Belmonte (3)	Open event. $15,000 top prize.
Detroit Open	Mar 11*	Allen Park, MI	Mar 9–10	Live*	Detroit Open	Norm Duke (35)	Open event. $10,000 top prize.
Brunswick Euro Challenge	N/A	Sainte-Maxime, France	Mar 17–24	Mar 25		Mike Fagan (4)	Open event. €15,000 top prize.
Lumber Liquidators Mark Roth-Marshall Holman; PBA Exempt Players Doubles Championship	Mar 25	Las Vegas, NV	Nov 14–16	Nov 20	Earl Anthony	Norm Duke (36) and Wes Malott (7)	Exempt event. $15,000 top prize.
Carmen Salvino Classic	Apr 1	Las Vegas, NV	Nov 14	Nov 20	Earl Anthony	Andres Gomez (1)	Exempt event with TQR. $15,000 top prize.
PBA Dick Weber Playoffs	Apr 1*	Indianapolis, IN	Mar 30–31	Live*	Dick Weber	Norm Duke (37)	PBA Tour and PBA Regional members only. $20,000 top prize.
Pepsi PBA Elite Players Championship	Apr 8	Las Vegas, NV	Nov 14–16	Nov 20	Earl Anthony	Jason Belmonte (4)	Exempt event. $35,000 top prize and automatic berth in the "Round of 36" at the PBA Tournament of Champions.
PBA Tournament of Champions	Apr 15	Las Vegas, NV	Apr 8–14	Live	ToC (custom)	Sean Rash (5)	Past PBA Tour, PBA Regional and PBA Senior Tour champions only. $80,000 top prize.

An asterisk (*) indicates a tournament that was broadcast start-to-finish (including finals) on the PBA Xtra Frame webcast service. All other broadcasts were on ESPN television.
