= 2012–13 PBA Tour season =

PBA Bowling Tour: 2012–13 Season
- League: Professional Bowlers Association
- Sport: Ten-pin bowling
- Duration: October 23, 2012 – November 30, 2013

PBA Tour
- Season MVP: Jason Belmonte

PBA Tour seasons
- ← 2011–12 2014 →

This is a recap of the 2012–13 season for the Professional Bowlers Association (PBA) Tour. It was the tour's 54th season, and the fourth straight season in which all of the North American fall events are condensed into the PBA World Series of Bowling (WSOB). The season consisted of 34 individual title events, plus a "PBA League" team title event. The PBA billed 2012–13 as a "super season", running longer than one full year, in preparation for a return to a calendar-year season format for 2014.

This is also the first season since 2003–04 in which all events are open to any PBA member, as the Tour has abandoned the "exempt" tour format that began in the 2004–05 season. While "exempt" status for touring players has been dropped, the PBA Tour will still have a points system which affects a few events as well as "Touring 1" and "Touring 2" player statuses.

== Tournament schedule and recaps ==
For the fourth season in a row, the PBA held the fall North American events in one location at the GEICO PBA World Series of Bowling (WSOB). Preliminary rounds of the televised tournaments were November 3–7, with television tapings on November 10–11. All of the events were held at the South Point Casino's bowling center in Las Vegas, Nevada. The season will run an unprecedented 14 months, concluding with a second PBA World Series of Bowling in the fall of 2013. This is in preparation for a move to a calendar year national tour format in 2014. In all, the 2012–13 season will have 40 title events, including 15 international tour stops. The international stops are part of the World Bowling Tour (WBT), but will award PBA titles to winners who are full-fledged PBA members at the time of the tournament (including members of international PBA organizations).

The World Series of Bowling for 2012 included four stand-alone title tournaments (Cheetah Championship, Viper Championship, Chameleon Championship and Scorpion Championship), plus the PBA World Championship major. The qualifying rounds of each stand-alone "animal pattern" event (8 games each for a total of 32 games) also served as the initial qualifying for the PBA World Championship. The PBA World Championship then held match-play for the top 24 bowlers on November 8–9. The WBT Men's and WBT Women's final rounds were also taped at the WSOB for a later TV broadcast. The WBT Men's final is now a PBA title event (it was not in 2011). All final rounds at the 2012 WSOB returned to a stepladder format, after an "eliminator" format was used for several events in 2011.

Following the WSOB, the Round1 Japan Cup invitational tournament (formerly Dydo Japan Cup) took place November 29 – December 2 in Japan. This tournament, which typically includes a number of PBA Tour players and is a PBA title event, was not held in 2011 due to the earthquake and resulting tsunami in Japan.

After three more international tour stops, the "PBA Winter Swing" commenced in North America with four tournaments in Allen Park, Michigan held January 19–28, 2013. The "PBA Summer Swing" took place May 19 – June 2, with four full tournaments held in and around Milwaukee, Wisconsin, plus a made-for-TV "King of the Swing" stepladder final. The remaining three major tournaments are spread out through 2013 (USBC Masters in February, Barbasol PBA Tournament of Champions in March, and U.S. Open in July).

=== Tournament summary ===
Below is a schedule of events for the 2012–13 PBA Tour season. Major tournaments are in bold. Career PBA title numbers for winners are shown in parentheses (x).

| Event | Airdate | City | Preliminary rounds | Final round | Oil pattern | Winner | Notes |
|---|---|---|---|---|---|---|---|
| Australian Masters | N/A | Sydney, Australia | Oct 23-26, 2012 | Oct 27, 2012 | | Jason Belmonte (5) | WBT and PBA title event. $25,000 first prize. |
| Bayer Advanced Aspirin; World Bowling Tour Men's Final | Dec 9, 2012 E | Las Vegas, NV | Multiple dates | Nov 10, 2012 | | Chris Barnes | Not a PBA title event. $20,000 first prize. |
| Bayer Advanced Aspirin; World Bowling Tour Women's Final | Dec 9, 2012 E | Las Vegas, NV | Multiple dates | Nov 10, 2012 | | Missy Parkin | Not a PBA title event. $20,000 first prize. |
| Alka Seltzer Plus Cold Medicine; Cheetah Championship | Dec 16, 2012 E | Las Vegas, NV | Nov 3–7, 2012 | Nov 10, 2012 | Cheetah | Bill O'Neill (4) | Open event. $20,000 first prize. |
| PBA Viper Championship | Dec 23, 2012 E | Las Vegas, NV | Nov 3–7, 2012 | Nov 10, 2012 | Viper | Brad Angelo (2) | Open event. $20,000 first prize. |
| PBA Chameleon Championship | Dec 30, 2012 E | Las Vegas, NV | Nov 3–7, 2012 | Nov 11, 2012 | Chameleon | Scott Norton (2) | Open event. $20,000 first prize. |
| Bowlers Journal Scorpion Championship | Jan 6, 2013 E | Las Vegas, NV | Nov 3–7, 2012 | Nov 11, 2012 | Scorpion | Tom Daugherty (1) | Open event. $20,000 first prize. |
| **PBA World Championship** 2012 | Jan 13, 2013 E | Las Vegas, NV | Nov 3–9, 2012 | Nov 11, 2012 | World Championship | Parker Bohn III (33) | Open event for WSOB entrants. $50,000 first prize. |
| Round1 Japan Cup 2012 | Jan 20, 2013 E | Japan | Nov 29 – Dec 1, 2012 | Dec 2, 2012 | | Mika Koivuniemi (10) | Invitational for JPBA and PBA members. $71,700 top prize. |
| WBT Qatar Open | | Doha, Qatar | Dec 9–14, 2012 | Dec 15, 2012 | | Mika Koivuniemi (11) | Open WBT and PBA title event. $39,480 top prize. |
| WBT Brunswick BallMaster Open | | Helsinki, Finland | Jan 4–12 | Jan 13 | | Jesper Svensson, Sweden (amateur) | Open WBT and PBA title event. €12,000 top prize. |
| WBT International Bowling Championship | | Inazawa, Japan | Jan 15–18 | Jan 19 | | Tommy Jones (14) | Open WBT and PBA title event. $75,000 top prize. |
| PBA League | Jan 27, 2013 E | Allen Park, MI | Jan 19–25 | Live (Round 1 only) | | Team event. | |
| Chris Paul PBA League All-Stars | Feb 3, 2013 E | Los Angeles, CA | n/a | Jan 7 | | Chris Barnes and Chris Hardwick | Invitational charity pro-am event. |
| Carmen Salvino Classic; PBA League Round 2 | Feb 10, 2013 E | Allen Park, MI | Jan 19–25 | Jan 26 | Carmen Salvino | Andres Gomez (2) | Open event. $15,000 top prize. |
| Mark Roth Classic; PBA League Round 3 | Feb 17, 2013 E | Allen Park, MI | Jan 19–25 | Jan 26 | Mark Roth | Michael Haugen Jr. (3) | Open event. $15,000 top prize. |
| **USBC Masters** | Feb 24, 2014 E | North Brunswick, NJ | Feb 18–23 | Live | Custom | Jason Belmonte (6) | Open to PBA and qualifying USBC members. $50,000 top prize. |
| Don Carter Classic; PBA League Round 4 | Mar 3, 2013 E | Allen Park, MI | Jan 19–25 | Jan 26 | Don Carter | Jason Sterner (1) | Open event. $15,000 top prize. |
| Earl Anthony PBA Players Championship; PBA League Round 5 | Mar 24, 2013 E | Allen Park, MI | Jan 19–25 | Jan 27 | Earl Anthony | Scott Norton (3) | Open event. $25,000 top prize. |
| WBT Bahrain Open | | Bahrain | Mar 3–8 | Mar 9 | | Osku Palermaa (3) | Open WBT and PBA title event. |
| WBT Kuwait Open | | Kuwait City, Kuwait | Mar 13–16 | Mar 17 | | Sean Rash (6) | Open WBT and PBA title event. |
| WBT Brunswick EuroChallenge | | Munich, Germany | Mar 15–23 | Mar 24 | | Ronnie Russell (1) | Open WBT and PBA title event. €15,000 top prize. |
| **Barbasol PBA Tournament of Champions** | Mar 31, 2013 E | Indianapolis, IN | Mar 26–30 | Live | ToC (custom) | Pete Weber (37) | Invitational. Most recent 48 PBA Tour champions and past ToC winners only. $50,000 top prize. |
| PBA League Finals | Apr 7, 2013 E | Indianapolis, IN | Jan 19–27 | Mar 31 | | NYC WTT KingPins (Owner: Billie Jean King. Team: Pete Weber, Tommy Jones, Scott Norton, Jack Jurek, John Szczerbinski, Kelly Kulick-alt) | Team event. $75,000 top prize. |
| Lucas Oil PBA Badger Open | Jun 11, 2013 C | Waukesha, WI | May 19–21 | Jun 1 | Badger | Jake Peters (1) | Open event. |
| Lucas Oil PBA Wolf Open | Jun 18, 2013 C | Milwaukee, WI | May 22–24 | Jun 1 | Wolf | Chris Loschetter (1) | Open event. |
| Lucas Oil PBA Bear Open | Jun 25, 2013 C | Wauwatosa, WI | May 26–28 | Jun 1 | Bear | Jason Belmonte (7) | Open event. |
| Lucas Oil PBA Milwaukee Open | Jul 2, 2013 C | Milwaukee, WI | May 19–30 | Jun 2 | Top seed chooses (Badger) | Chris Barnes (15) | Starting field includes 28 players with the highest total pinfalls from Badger, Wolf and Bear open qualifying. |
| GEICO PBA Summer "King of the Swing" | Jul 9, 2013 C | Milwaukee, WI | May 19–30 | Jun 2 | Top seed chooses (Badger) | Norm Duke | Non-title event stepladder final only. Includes winners of Badger, Wolf, Bear and Milwaukee Opens, plus one non-winner with the highest qualifying pinfall. |
| **Lipton U.S. Open** | Jul 27, 2013 E | Columbus, OH | Jul 21–26 | Live | U.S. Open (custom) | Wes Malott (8) | Open event. $50,000 first prize. |
| WTBA World Championships | | Henderson, NV | Aug 17–30 | Aug 31 | | Cho Young-Seon (Korea) | Open event for WBT members. |
| WBT Vienna Open | | Vienna, Austria | Oct 1–5 | Oct 6 | | Mika Koivuniemi (12) | Open WBT and PBA title event. |
| WBT Thailand Open | | Bangkok, Thailand | Oct 14–20 | Oct 21 | | Sean Rash (7) | Open WBT and PBA title event. |
| WSOB Cheetah Championship | Dec 1, 2013 E | Las Vegas, NV | Oct 25–26 | Nov 2 | Cheetah | Wes Malott (9) | Open event. $20,000 first prize. |
| WSOB Viper Championship | Dec 8, 2013 E | Las Vegas, NV | Oct 25, 27 | Nov 2 | Viper | Chris Barnes (16) | Open event. $20,000 first prize. |
| WSOB Chameleon Championship | Dec 15, 2013 E | Las Vegas, NV | Oct 25, 28 | Nov 2 | Chameleon | Ryan Ciminelli (2) | Open event. $20,000 first prize. |
| WSOB Scorpion Championship | Dec 22, 2013 E | Las Vegas, NV | Oct 25, 29 | Nov 3 | Scorpion | Tom Smallwood (2) | Open event. $20,000 top prize. |
| **PBA World Championship** 2013 | Dec 29, 2013 E | Las Vegas, NV | Oct 25–31 | Nov 3 | Top seed chooses | Dom Barrett (2) | Open event for WSOB entrants. $50,000 first prize. |
| World Bowling Tour Women's Final | Jan 5, 2014 E | Las Vegas, NV | Multiple dates | Nov 3 | | Kelly Kulick | Non-title event. $20,000 top prize. |
| World Bowling Tour Men's Final | Jan 5, 2014 E | Las Vegas, NV | Multiple dates | Nov 3 | | Sean Rash | Non-title event. $20,000 first prize. |
| Round1 Japan Cup 2013 | Jan 19, 2014 E | Japan | Nov 27–29 | Nov 30 | | Yuya Katoh | Invitational for JPBA and PBA members. |
| Abu Dhabi WBT | N/A | Abu Dhabi, United Arab Emirates | Dec 1-5 | Dec 6 | | Thomas Larsen (1) | Open WBT and PBA title event. $30,000 (U.S.) top prize. |
| 7th Kingdom International Open | N/A | Riyadh, Saudi Arabia | Dec 11-15 | Dec 16 | | Tommy Jones (15) | Open WBT and PBA title event. $25,000 (U.S.) top prize. |

- C: broadcast on CBS Sports Network
- E: broadcast on ESPN
