= Scott Norton (bowler) =

American bowler

- Born: February 18, 1982 (age 44)
- Occupation: Ten-pin bowler
- Years active: 2008–present
- Spouse: Craig Woodward (m. 2011)

Scott Norton (born February 18, 1982) is a left-handed American professional bowler and attorney, now living in Mission Viejo, California. He is a member of the Professional Bowlers Association and has won three PBA Tour titles, including one major championship.

== Bowling career ==
The son of Rick Norton and United States Bowling Congress Hall of Famer Virginia Norton, he began bowling at around the age of four. When he was 18, he won 21 amateur bowling titles, won the gold medal at the Junior World Amateur Championships and, as captain of the adult team, became the youngest person ever to win the Adult National Amateur Championship (in 2000). He attended California State University, Fullerton where he majored in history. He was named the collegiate bowler of the year for 2000–2001. Norton was a member of Team USA in 2001, and at the 2001 QubicaAMF World Cup in Thailand, he shot the event's only 300 game. After completing his undergraduate degree at the University of Utah, Norton attended Hastings College of the Law at the University of California and passed the California bar exam in 2009.

Norton joined the Professional Bowlers Association in 2008. He was named the 2009 PBA West Region Rookie of the Year. A win in December 2009 at the Sands Regency PBA Regional Players Invitational in Reno earned Norton $7,500 in prize money and an exemption, or automatic spot, on the 2010–11 PBA Tour.

At the 2010 World Series of Bowling, he won his first PBA Tour title, the PBA Chameleon Championship. Norton was ranked 18th for the 2010–11 season. In May 2011 the PBA named Norton the Harry Golden PBA Rookie of the Year. He won his second PBA Tour title, again in the PBA Chameleon Championship, at the 2012 World Series of Bowling, defeating 2011 Chameleon champion Jason Belmonte in the final match. To get to the finals, Norton defeated PBA Hall of Famer and all-time titles leader Walter Ray Williams, Jr. in the semifinal. This second victory on November 11, 2012 also ended a 20-month title drought for left-handed bowlers on the PBA Tour. Prior to Norton's win, the last left-handed bowler to win a title was Jason Couch on March 6, 2011.

Norton won a second title in the 2012–13 PBA season (his third overall) at the Earl Anthony PBA Players Championship in Allen Park, MI on January 27, 2013. He defeated 2011–12 PBA Player of the Year Sean Rash in the final match, 219–191. The event was broadcast March 24, 2013 on ESPN. Norton was retroactively awarded a major title for this victory when the PBA Players Championship returned to major status in the 2016 season. The PBA voted to award additional major titles to the winners of the three previous Players Championship events (2011, 2013, 2015), stating the tournament "is a members-only event, and includes all of the elements of a major."

Scott was nominated for the 2013 "Best Bowler" ESPY Award, along with Jason Belmonte and Pete Weber. The award was won by Weber. After a down year in 2014, in which he never appeared on television, he made three TV finals in 2015 but did not win a title.

In his brief PBA career, Norton has earned over $260,000 and has nine perfect games in PBA competition. He has won 11 PBA Regional Tour titles. He is a pro staff member for Columbia 300 bowling balls.

=== PBA titles ===
Major titles in bold text.

1. 2010 PBA Chameleon Championship
2. 2012 PBA Chameleon Championship
3. **2013 PBA Players Championship**

== Personal ==
On May 19, 2011, inspired by the coming out of Phoenix Suns President and CEO Rick Welts, Norton released a statement acknowledging that he is gay. "It is extremely important for me to come out to show other gay athletes, both current and future, that it is important to come out to show that we are just like everyone else. Being gay doesn't define who I am as a person or as a professional athlete....It's important to show people that being gay has nothing to do with one's ability to do anything as a man, least of all compete at the highest level of sports."

Norton's husband is Craig Woodward. The couple held a wedding ceremony on October 22, 2011 in Laguna Beach, California. After winning the 2012 PBA WSOB Chameleon Championship, ESPN caught a shot of Norton kissing his husband after his victory, which immediately became a spark with the media.
