= 2014 PBA Tour season =

PBA Bowling Tour: 2014 Season
- League: Professional Bowlers Association
- Sport: Ten-pin bowling
- Duration: January 3 – December 15

PBA Tour
- Season MVP: Jason Belmonte

PBA Tour seasons
- ← 2012–13 2015 →

2014 is the 55th season of the Professional Bowlers Association (PBA) Tour and the sixth straight season in which all of the North American fall events are condensed into the PBA World Series of Bowling (WSOB). The 2014 season consisted of 20 individual title events plus a "PBA League" team title event. The 2014 season is the first season since 2000 to follow a calendar year schedule.

== Tournament schedule and recaps ==
For the sixth year in a row, the PBA held the fall North American events in one location at the PBA World Series of Bowling VI (WSOB VI). Preliminary rounds and match play took place October 24 through October 31, with taping of the final televised rounds on November 2. The four standard "animal pattern" tournaments in WSOB VI served as the initial qualifying rounds for the PBA World Championship. After 28 qualifying games (7 per pattern tournament), the top 24 bowlers (in total pinfall) bowled an additional 24 games of match play (three rounds of eight games) to determine the top five players for the TV finals. The World Championship returned to a split format, as in 2009-10. After the match play rounds at WSOB VI, the stepladder finals were held live on January 11, 2015.

Following the WSOB, the Round1 Japan Cup invitational tournament took place in Japan, with a final televised round on November 15. Several international tour stops, which are part of the World Bowling Tour (WBT), were again part of the PBA Tour schedule. As in 2012–13, a PBA title is awarded if any of these stops are won by a PBA member.

Notably absent from the PBA schedule in 2014 is the U.S. Open. The event was not hosted in 2014, as the BPAA (the tournament's primary sponsor) was unable to find additional sponsorship.

=== Season highlights ===
- Jason Belmonte won the first two majors of the season, at the Barbasol Tournament of Champions and the USBC Masters, giving him three majors among his ten total titles. This was Jason's second consecutive victory in the USBC Masters, making him the first person to successfully defend a Masters title since Billy Welu in 1965.
- The "PBA League" team tournament was held for the second straight season. The 2014 team title went to the Silver Lake Atom Splitters, coached by former pro Mark Baker and featuring Chris Barnes, Bryon Smith, Tommy Jones, Wes Malott, and Dom Barrett as team members.
- Sean Rash rolled the PBA's 23rd televised perfect 300 game in the opening match of the PBA Wolf Open finals, which aired June 3. Sean went on to win the tournament for his eighth PBA title.
- Ronnie Russell rolled the PBA's 24th televised 300 game in the challenge round of the WSOB Chameleon Championship on November 2, 2014 (broadcast December 28, 2014). Russell would lose the title match, however, to D. J. Archer.

=== Tournament summary ===
Below is a schedule of events for the 2014 PBA Tour season. Major tournaments are in bold. Career PBA title numbers for winners are shown in parentheses (x).

Event	Airdate	City	Preliminary rounds	Final round	Oil pattern	Winner	Notes
Brunswick Ballmaster Open	N/A	Helsinki, Finland	Jan 3–11	Jan 12		Mika Koivuniemi, Finland (13)	WBT and PBA title event. €12,000 first prize.
**Barbasol PBA Tournament of Champions**	Jan 26 E	Allen Park, MI	Jan 16–24	Live	TOC custom	Jason Belmonte, Australia (8)	Invitational event. PBA major. $40,000 first prize.
**USBC Masters**	Feb 23 E	North Brunswick, NJ	Feb 17–22	Live	Custom	Jason Belmonte, Australia (9)	Open event. PBA major. $50,000 first prize.
Emir Cup	N/A	Doha, Qatar	Feb 22–26	Feb 27		Chris Barnes, USA (17)	WBT open event. $25,000 first prize.
Bahrain International Open	N/A	Bahrain	Mar 1–6	Mar 7		Shaker Al Hassan, United Arab Emirates	WBT open event. $25,000 first prize.
Kuwait International Open	N/A	Kuwait City	Mar 8–13	Mar 14		Thomas Larsen, Denmark (2)	WBT open event. $25,000 first prize.
Brunswick Euro Challenge	N/A	Munich, Germany	Mar 15–22	Mar 23		Marshall Kent, USA (amateur)	WBT open event. €11,111 first prize.
PBA League Elias Cup Final	Apr 13 E	Allen Park, MI	Jan 16–24	Jan 25	Multiple	Silver Lake Atom Splitters (Chris Barnes, Bryon Smith, Tommy Jones, Wes Malott, Dom Barrett; Owner: Chris Hardwick; Coach: Mark Baker)	Non-title team event.
PBA Wolf Open	Jun 3 C	Shawnee, OK	May 19, 22	May 24	Wolf	Sean Rash, USA (8)	Open event. $10,000 first prize.
PBA Bear Open	Jun 10 C	Shawnee, OK	May 20, 22	May 24	Bear	Ronnie Russell, USA (2)	Open event. $10,000 first prize.
PBA Badger Open	Jun 17 C	Shawnee, OK	May 21–22	May 24	Badger	Bill O'Neill, USA (5)	Open event. $10,000 first prize.
PBA Oklahoma Open	Jun 24 C	Shawnee, OK	May 19–22	May 25	Top seed (E.J. Tackett) chose Bear	Jason Belmonte, Australia (10)	Top 18 from pattern events qualify. Top 5 after 18 additional match play games advance to TV. $18,000 first prize.
PBA "King of the Swing"	Jul 1 C	Shawnee, OK	May 19–22, 24–25	May 25	Top seed (Bill O'Neill) chose Badger	Bill O'Neill	Non-title stepladder final; four Summer Swing title winners plus "wild card" player (top pinfall among non-winners) compete for an additional $10,000.
WBT Thailand Open	N/A	Bangkok, Thailand	Aug 18–23	Aug 25		Osku Palermaa, Finland (4)	WBT open event. $32,258 first prize.
WSOB VI Cheetah Championship	Dec 14 E	Las Vegas, NV	Oct 25, 30	Nov 2	Cheetah	Anthony Pepe, USA (1)	Open event. $20,000 first prize.
WSOB VI Viper Championship	Dec 21 E	Las Vegas, NV	Oct 26, 30	Nov 2	Viper	Mika Koivuniemi, Finland (14)	Open event. $20,000 first prize.
WSOB VI Chameleon Championship	Dec 28 E	Las Vegas, NV	Oct 27, 31	Nov 2	Chameleon	D. J. Archer, USA (1)	Open event. $20,000 first prize.
WSOB VI Scorpion Championship	Jan 4, 2015 E	Las Vegas, NV	Oct 28, 31	Nov 2	Scorpion	Michael Haugen Jr., USA (4)	Open event. $20,000 first prize.
**PBA World Championship**	Jan 11, 2015 E	Las Vegas, NV	Oct 25–31	Live	Top seed chooses	Mike Fagan, USA (5)	Open event for WSOB entrants. $50,000 first prize.
Round1 Japan Cup	TBD	Tokyo	Nov 10–14	Nov 15		Park Kyung Shin, South Korea	Invitational for JPBA and PBA members. $51,700 first prize.
WBT Qatar Open	TBD	Doha, Qatar	Nov 21–26	Nov 27		Dom Barrett, England (4)	WBT open event. $40,000 first prize.
8th Kingdom International Open	TBD	Riyadh, Saudi Arabia	Nov 28–Dec 2	Dec 3		Marshall Kent, USA (1)	WBT open event. $10,000 first prize.

- C: broadcast on CBS Sports Network
- E: broadcast on ESPN
- +Sean Rash won an additional $10,000 for scoring 300 in the opening match of the TV finals of the PBA Wolf Open.
- ++Ronnie Russell won an additional $10,000 for scoring 300 in the opening match of the TV finals of the WSOB VI Chameleon Open.
