= Marshall Kent (bowler) =

American ten-pin bowler (born 1992)

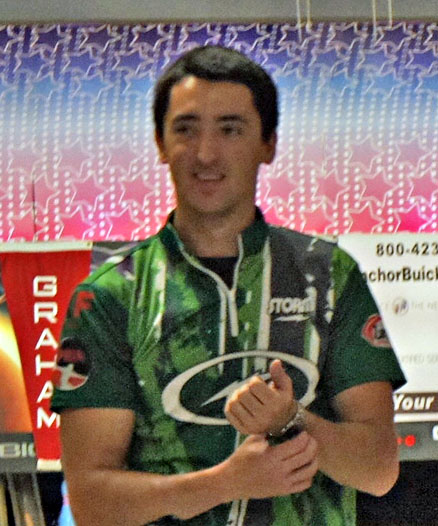
- Kent in 2017

Personal information
- Born: September 21, 1992 (age 34) Yakima, Washington, U.S.

Bowling Information
- Affiliation: PBA
- Dominant hand: Right
- Wins: 9 PBA Tour (1 major); 5 PBA Regional Tour
- 300-games: 17
- Sponsors: Hammer, Turbo Grips, Dexter shoes, Apparel EFX, CTD Bowling

Marshall Kent (born September 21, 1992) is an American professional ten-pin bowler from Yakima, Washington now residing in Clarkston, Michigan. He currently competes on the PBA Tour. He has also competed internationally as a member of Junior Team USA, and a six-time member of Team USA. He has won nine PBA Tour titles (including one major) and five PBA Regional titles.

After 8 years as a member of the Storm Bowling pro staff, Kent accepted a sponsorship agreement with BIG Bowling in 2021. After the PBA removed BIG Bowling as a registered product, Kent signed a sponsorship agreement with Hammer Bowling in 2023. He is also sponsored by Turbo Grips, Dexter shoes and Apparel EFX.

== Amateur career ==
Kent was a three-time member of Junior Team USA, and has been a Team USA member multiple times since 2012. He was a two-time Collegiate Player of the Year (2011–12 and 2012–13) bowling for Robert Morris University in Chicago, Illinois, where he also earned a degree in Business Administration.

Kent won a gold medal in trios at the 2011 PABCON Youth Championships, and was the 2012 Russian Open Champion. He won two gold medals (singles and team) in the 2012 World Youth Championships, and a team gold medal in the 2012 PABCON Championships.

Kent bowled as an amateur in the 2013 PBA Scorpion Championship and finished runner-up to Tom Smallwood. He won the 2014 Brunswick Euro Challenge as an amateur, and thus his win did not qualify for a PBA title.

== Professional bowling career ==
Shortly after his Brunswick Euro Challenge win in March 2014, Kent joined the Professional Bowlers Association. He was named the 2014 Harry Golden PBA Rookie of the Year, having won the Kingdom International Open for his first PBA Tour title. He picked up his second win at the PBA Team Challenge in 2016.

2017 was Kent's first year with multiple PBA Tour wins, as he won his first two singles titles on US soil. His second win of the season in the PBA Oklahoma Open was his first on US television. He finished the season fourth in PBA earnings, with a career-best (to date) $115,530. Through 2021, he had 17 career 300 games in PBA competition.

Despite a career-high five championship round appearances, Kent failed to win a title in the 2018 PBA Tour season. He did win the non-title season-ending PBA Clash event on December 23, a made-for-TV event that marked the debut of the PBA on Fox network.

Kent won his fifth PBA Tour title on March 6, 2022 in the Roth-Holman Doubles Championship, as he and partner E. J. Tackett climbed the ladder from the #4 seed. Despite the title, Kent's 2022 season saw him post career lows in cashes (4), average (206.84) and earnings ($22,450).

On February 10, 2024, Kent won his sixth PBA Tour title, his first singles title since 2017, at the PBA Illinois Classic. After qualifying as the top seed, he defeated A.J. Johnson in his lone TV finals match to take the championship.

On April 28, 2024, Kent won the PBA Tournament of Champions. As the #4 seed, he defeated Jason Sterner, Matthew Ogle, E.J. Tackett, and Anthony Simonsen en route to his first major and seventh PBA Tour title. He took home the top prize of $100,000 for the largest payday in his career. The win moved Kent up to second place on the PBA points list through the end of the spring season, behind only Tackett. Kent qualified for the PBA Tour Finals, a "postseason" event featuring the top eight players in Tour points over the last two seasons. Kent emerged as the Group 1 winner, defeating Bill O'Neill in the group stepladder final. He went on to face Group 2 winner Anthony Simonsen, whom he had defeated in the title match of the Tournament of Champions earlier this season. After splitting two games in the "race to two points" final (210–246, 248–200), Kent was defeated in the 9th/10th frame roll-off, 38–40. For the 2024 season, Kent finished second in Tour points and cashed a career-high $210,158. He finished third in the 2024 Chris Schenkel PBA Player of the Year voting.

Despite being 7 years old at the turn of the century, Kent ranked #22 on the PBA's 2025 "Best 25 PBA Players of the Last 25 Seasons" list. The ranking was based on a points system that took into account standard titles, major titles, top-five finishes and Player of the Year awards.

On March 22, 2026, Kent won his eighth PBA Tour title at the PBA Indiana Classic. Having qualified as the #2 seed, he eliminated E. J. Tackett in the semifinal match before defeating top seed David Krol for the championship. Kent's 152–136 victory on a beat-up oil pattern was the lowest winning score and lowest combined score of any title match in PBA Tour history.

On June 21, 2026, Kent won his ninth PBA Tour title at the PBA Norm Duke Open. Having qualified as the #2 seed for the Group 1 Stepladder, he defeated Richie Teece in the semifinal before defeating Deo Benard in the group final to advance to the championship match. In the "race to two points" championship, he faced the winner of the Group 2 Stepladder, Anthony Simonsen. Kent lost the first match, 203–244, but he won the second game, 223–210, on the strength of three split conversions (4–9, 4–10, 3–10). Kent then won the 9th/10th frame roll-off, 42–39, to earn his second title of the 2026 PBA Tour season.

=== PBA Tour titles ===
Major titles in bold text.

1. 2014: Kingdom International Open (Riyadh, Saudi Arabia)
2. 2016: PBA Team Challenge w/'Merica Rooster Illusion team: E. J. Tackett, Rhino Page, Ronnie Russell, and Chris Loschetter (Las Vegas, NV)
3. 2017: Xtra Frame Lubbock Sports Open (Lubbock, TX)
4. 2017: Grand Casino Hotel & Resort PBA Oklahoma Open (Shawnee, OK)
5. 2022: PBA WSOB XIII Roth-Holman Doubles Championship w/E. J. Tackett (Wauwatosa, WI)
6. 2024: PBA Illinois Classic (Mount Prospect, IL)
7. 2024: **PBA Tournament of Champions** (Fairlawn, OH)
8. 2026: PBA Indiana Classic (Fort Wayne, IN)
9. 2026: The Magnum Ice Cream Company PBA Norm Duke Open (Bethlehem, PA)

=== PBA Tour non-title wins ===
1. 2014 Brunswick Euro Challenge (competed as an amateur; not eligible for PBA title)
2. 2018 PBA Clash

== Career statistics ==
Season	Events	Cashes	Match Play	CRA+	PBA Titles (majors)	Average	Earnings ($)
2012–13	6	3	2	1	0	215.18	12,735
2014	13	9	3	1	1	217.03	32,528
2015	23	16	8	1	0	218.04	56,793
2016	28	18	7	1	1	219.29	77,670
2017	21	17	9	3	2	221.53	115,530
2018	29	18	11	5	0	217.54	101,890
2019	27	17	11	4	0	214.62	59,948
2020	8	6	3	1	0	219.29	32,420
2021	14	8	0	1	0	213.72	26,355
2022	12	4	1	1	1	206.84	22,450
2023	16	9	4	0	0	217.45	57,950
2024	17	12	3	3	2 (1)	224.74	210,158
2025	16	8	2	0	0	213.43	24,450
2026	17	7	4	3	2	217.35	91,875
Totals	247	152	68	25	9 (1)	---	922,752

+CRA = Championship Round Appearances

== Personal life ==
From 2013 to early 2018, Marshall dated PWBA bowler Danielle McEwan. The two initially met when both were members of Junior Team USA, but did not officially become a couple until representing Team USA at an event in Bangkok, Thailand. After almost five years of dating, McEwan and Kent went their separate ways for unspecified personal reasons. His current girlfriend, Cassandra, was in the audience for Kent's 2024 PBA Tournament of Champions win, sitting next to his mother.

Originally from Yakima, Washington, Kent relocated to Las Vegas, Nevada in 2019. Late in 2023, Kent relocated again to suburban Detroit in Michigan. In his Fox TV appearance on February 25, 2024, his profile showed his residence as Clarkston, Michigan.
