= World Bowling Tour =

- Abbreviation: WBT
- Formation: 2011
- Headquarters: Arlington, Texas
- Parent organization: World Bowling
- Affiliations: World Tenpin Bowling Association (WTBA)
- Website: World Bowling Tour

The World Bowling Tour, a major professional tour, unites bowlers from selected major professional and amateur organizations through a series of events organized by World Bowling.

The World Bowling Tour's marquee event, the WTBA World Championships, attracts bowlers from over 50 countries. World Bowling Tour events include all the PBA Tour major tournaments. As a stepladder tournament, the season-ending World Bowling Tour Finals features the top three men, and top three women in the World Bowling Tour points standings.

== Tour Qualifications ==
To participate in the World Bowling Tour, bowlers must be a member of one of the federations of the World Tenpin Bowling Association. The federations of the WTBA include:

- Professional Bowlers Association, which include the PBA Tour, PBA50, and PBA international;
- Professional Women's Bowling Association.
- Thai Tenpin Bowling Association;
- Korea Professional Bowlers Association;
- Japan Professional Bowling Association;

The winner of a WBT tournament can also earn credit for a PBA Tour title, as long as the bowler registered for the tournament beforehand as a professional. International bowlers, bowlers who do not reside in the United States, can also join the PBA under its PBA International program. If a PBA International member wins a WBT tournament, he must upgrade to full membership of the PBA.

== WBT Tournaments ==
The entry fee for a WBT tournament is US$5,000. Winners of World Bowling Tour events also qualify for the PBA Tournament of Champions.

=== 2019 Schedule ===
Tournaments listed in bold are considered majors by the World Bowling Tour.

Date	Event	Location	Tier
March 2–8, 2019	H.H. Emir Cup	Doha, Qatar	Tier 2
**March 11–21, 2019**	**PBA World Series of Bowling**	(United States) **Detroit, MI**	**Tier 1**
**March 26 - April 4, 2019**	**USBC Masters**	(United States) **Las Vegas, NV**	**Tier 1**
**May 15–21, 2019**	**USBC Queens**	(United States) **Wichita, KS**	**Tier 1 - Women Only**
**June 16–23, 2019**	**US Women's Open**	(United States) **Las Vegas, NV**	**Tier 1 - Women Only**
July 25–28, 2019	Storm PBA/PWBA Striking Against Breast Cancer	(United States) Houston, TX	Tier 2
August 16–18, 2019	New Mexico Open	(United States) Rio Rancho, NM	Tier 3
August 22–30, 2019	World Women's Championships	(United States) Las Vegas, NV	Tier 2 - Women Only
August 24–31, 2019	FloBowling PBA Summer Swing	(United States) Aurora, IL	Tier 2
August 24 - September 8, 2019	Lucky Larsen Masters	Helsingborg, Sweden	Tier 2
September (TBD), 2019	Thailand Open	Bangkok, Thailand	Tier 2
**October 23–30, 2019**	**U.S Open**	(United States) **Mooresville, NC**	**Tier 1**
October 31 - November 6, 2019	Kuwait Open	Kuwait City, Kuwait	Tier 2

=== Major tournaments ===
In order for a tournament to qualify as a major, it must offer a minimum prize fund of US$200,000. The tournaments that are recognized as majors by the World Bowling Tour include:

- International Bowling Championship supported by DHC (JBC)
- USBC Masters (USBC)
- United States Open (USBC)
- PBA World Championship (PBA Tour)
- PBA Tournament of Champions (PBA Tour)
- United States Women's Open (USBC)
- WTBA World Championships (WTBA)

=== World Bowling scoring ===
The World Bowling scoring system, described as "current frame scoring," is used during the stepladder finals of the World Bowling Tour Finals. Current frame scoring counts 30 pins for each strike (regardless of previous shot), 10 pins for each spare (bonus pins that are added match the first roll of the next frame), and basic pin count for open frames. The tenth frame follows the same format as the first nine frames. That means no bonus, or fill shots, are given. The maximum score is still 300, achieved with ten rather than twelve, consecutive strikes. World Bowling scoring is intended to be easier to understand than traditional scoring for fans or bowlers that are new to the sport. The television networks also advertised current frame scoring to increase struggling television ratings.

=== Match play scoring ===
Match play scoring is a 12-frame system that made its first national appearance in bowling at the 2014 World Bowling Tour finals. This system scores by counting frames won rather than counting total pinfall. It resembles match play scoring in golf where players go even, plus one, or minus one as the match progresses. A frame is won if a bowler has a higher pinfall on the first roll of the frame than their opponent. The bowler that wins the most frames will win the match.

== Previous World Bowling Tour Champions ==
Year	Male Winner	Male Runner-Up	Female Winner	Female Runner-Up
2011	(Finland) Mika Koivuniemi	(United States) Sean Rash	(United States) Cathy Dorin-Ballard	(Sweden) Sandra Andersson
2012	(United States) Chris Barnes	(Finland) Mika Koivuniemi	(United States) Missy Parkin	(United States) Liz Johnson
2013	(United States) Sean Rash	(United States) Mike Fagan	(United States) Kelly Kulick	(Sweden) Missy Parkin
2014	(Finland) Mika Koivuniemi	(United States) Sean Rash	(United States) Kelly Kulick	(United States) Liz Johnson
2015	(England) Dom Barrett	(United States) Mike Fagan	(United States) Danielle McEwan	(United States) Kelly Kulick
2016	(United States) Anthony Simonsen	(Sweden) Martin Larsen	(United States) Danielle McEwan	(United States) Liz Johnson
2017	(Australia) Jason Belmonte	(United States) Marshall Kent	(Latvia) Diana Zavjalova	(United States) Danielle McEwan
2019	(United States) E. J. Tackett	(United States) Anthony Simonsen	(United States) Liz Johnson	(United States) Danielle McEwan
