= 2017 PBA Tour season =

PBA Bowling Tour: 2017 Season
- League: Professional Bowlers Association
- Sport: Ten-pin bowling
- Duration: January 10 – November 19

PBA Tour
- Season MVP: Jason Belmonte

PBA Tour seasons
- ← 2016 2018 →

2017 is the 58th season of the Professional Bowlers Association (PBA) Tour. The 2017 schedule includes 24 singles title events, two doubles title events, and one non-title team event (PBA League).

== Tournament schedule and recaps ==
For the second year in a row, the PBA held three consecutive major tournaments in "Big February": The Barbasol PBA Players Championship, Fire Lake PBA Tournament of Champions, and the USBC Masters. The U.S. Open took place October 25 through November 1.

The season's final major, the PBA World Championship, was again part of the World Series of Bowling (WSOB), which took place November 7–19 at the National Bowling Stadium in Reno, Nevada. WSOB IX consisted of four "animal oil pattern" tournaments (Cheetah, Chameleon, Scorpion and Shark), each of which are standalone PBA title events while collectively serving as initial qualifying for the PBA World Championship. Total pinfall from the 40 games of animal pattern qualifying (10 games per tournament) determined the 49 bowlers for the Cashers Round of the World Championship. Cashers then bowled 20 more games (5 on each oil pattern) to determine the top five for the November 19 stepladder finals.

In April, the PBA announced the first-ever Main Event PBA Finals, held May 18–20 in Orlando, Florida and broadcast for five consecutive Tuesdays on CBS Sports Network, starting May 30. This is an invitational event that serves as a type of bowling "playoffs", similar to The Chase for the Cup in NASCAR or the FedEx Cup in PGA golf. The event featured the top eight players in PBA Tour earnings, from the start of the 2015 season through this year's USBC Masters. Players were seeded 1–8 based on earnings, and split into Group 1 (1, 4, 5 and 8 seeds) and Group 2 (2, 3, 6 and 7 seeds). The groups bowled a mixed roundrobin match play session of four matches each, which made up the first two broadcasts. Players were then re-seeded within their groups, based on total pinfall plus a 50 pin bonus for every match win. Group 1 and Group 2 stepladder matches were held next, and were broadcast in the third and fourth weeks. The Group 1 and Group 2 winners then faced off in the fifth and final broadcast in a three-game, total pinfall head-to-head match to determine the PBA Finals champion.

For a second straight year, the PBA kept a rolling points list for all of the season's Xtra Frame tournaments (so designated because they are broadcast start-to-finish on the PBA's Xtra Frame subscription webcast service). Last season, a $10,000 winner-take-all bonus was awarded to the top points earner in the series. For 2017, the Xtra Frame series was renamed the XF PBA Tour Storm Cup, with Storm Bowling sponsoring an expanded award platform. The top points earner in 2017 won a $20,000 bonus, with additional payouts for second through fifth-place finishers ($10,000, $8,000, $7,000 and $5,000). Seven tour stops made up the Storm Cup series. Two additional tournaments (DHC PBA Japan Invitational and PBA-PWBA Striking Against Breast Cancer Mixed Doubles) were also covered exclusively by Xtra Frame, but did not qualify for Xtra Frame series points.

=== Highlights ===
- Jason Belmonte became the only player in PBA history to win three majors in a single season (PBA Players Championship, USBC Masters, PBA World Championship), as well as the only player to win the USBC Masters four times.
- With her win at the PBA Chameleon Championship in November, Liz Johnson became the second female bowler (after Kelly Kulick) to win an event on the national PBA Tour.

=== Season awards ===
- Chris Schenkel PBA Player of the Year: Jason Belmonte
- Harry Golden PBA Rookie of the Year: Matt Sanders
- George Young High Average Award: Jason Belmonte (229.39)
- Steve Nagy Sportsmanship Award: Chris Loschetter
- Tony Reyes Community Service Award: Del Ballard Jr.

== Tournament summary ==
Below is a current schedule of events for the 2017 PBA Tour season. Major tournaments are in bold. Career PBA title numbers for winners are shown in parentheses.

Event	Airdate	City	Preliminary rounds	Final round	Oil pattern	Winner	Notes
DHC PBA Japan Invitational	Jan 14 X	Osaka, Japan	Jan 10–13	Live		E. J. Tackett, USA (6)	Invitational event. ¥5 million (US$43,800) first prize.
**Barbasol PBA Players Championship**	Feb 12 E	Columbus, OH	Feb 6–11	Live		Jason Belmonte, Australia (13)	Open event. PBA major. $40,000 top prize.
**52nd Fire Lake PBA Tournament of Champions**	Feb 19 E	Shawnee, OK	Feb 14–18	Live	TOC Custom	E. J. Tackett, USA (7)	Invitational event. PBA major. $50,000 top prize.
**USBC Masters**	Feb 26 E	Las Vegas, NV	Feb 20–25	Live	USBC Custom	Jason Belmonte, Australia (14)	Open event. PBA major. $30,000 top prize.
World Bowling Tour Men’s and Women’s Finals	Feb 26 E	Las Vegas, NV	2015–16 WBT events	Live		Women: Danielle McEwan, USA Men: Anthony Simonsen, USA	Top 3 men and Top 3 women in 2015–16 WBT tournament points. Non-title event. $20,000 top prize each player.
PBA Xtra Frame Reality Check Classic	Mar 19 X	Tamarac, FL	Mar 17–18	Live		Josh Blanchard, USA (3)	Open event. $10,000 top prize. (Make-up of cancelled 2016 event.)
PBA International WBT Brunswick Euro Challenge	N/A	Munich, Germany	Mar 20–25	Mar 26		Dominic Barrett, England (5)	WBT and PBA title event. €12,500 (US$13,452) first prize.
MaineQuarterly.com Mark Roth-Marshall Holman PBA Doubles Championship	Apr 16 E	Portland, ME	Apr 9–12	Live	Mark Roth	Jesper Svensson, Sweden (6) and Kyle Troup, USA (2)	Open event. $24,000 top prize.
L.L.Bean PBA League Elias Cup	Quarters: Apr 23, 30 E Semis: May 7 E Finals: May 14 E	Portland, ME	Apr 13–15	Apr 16	Multiple	Shipyard Dallas Strikers: Norm Duke (player-manager), Tommy Jones, Bill O'Neill, Rhino Page, B.J. Moore	Team event. $60,000 top prize.
Main Event PBA Tour Finals	Roundrobin (matches 1-8): May 30 C Roundrobin (matches 9-16): Jun 6 C Group 1 Stepladder: Jun 13 C Group 2 Stepladder: Jun 20 C Finals: Jun 27 C	Orlando, FL	May 18–19	May 20	Main Event (custom)	E. J. Tackett, USA (8)	Invitational event, $30,000 top prize. Top 8 in PBA Tour earnings, Jan 2015 through Feb 2017: (1) Jason Belmonte, (2) E.J. Tackett, (3) Dominic Barrett, (4) Jesper Svensson, (5) Anthony Simonsen, (6) Ryan Ciminelli, (7) Tommy Jones, (8) Sean Rash.
PBA Xtra Frame Wilmington Open	May 29 X	Wilmington, NC	May 26–28	Live		Anthony Simonsen, USA (3)	Open event. $10,000 top prize.
PBA Xtra Frame Jonesboro Open	Jun 4 X	Jonesboro, AR	Jun 2–3	Live		François Lavoie, Canada (3)	Open event. $12,500 top prize.
PBA Xtra Frame Lubbock Sports Open	Jun 11 X	Lubbock, TX	Jun 9–10	Live		Marshall Kent, USA (3)	Open event. $12,500 top prize.
PBA Xtra Frame Billy Hardwick Memorial Open	Jun 25 X	Memphis, TN	Jun 23–24	Live	Low-volume oil	Matt Sanders, USA (1)	Open event, $10,000 top prize. Players limited to using two plastic (polyester) bowling balls.
Grand Casino Hotel & Resort PBA Oklahoma Open	Play-in Stepladder: Jul 1 E Finals: Jul 2 E	Shawnee, OK	Jun 26 – Jul 1	Live	Wolf, Bear, Badger, Oklahoma. Top seed chooses finals pattern.	Marshall Kent, USA (4)	Open event. $30,000 top prize.
Storm PBA-PWBA Striking Against Breast Cancer Mixed Doubles	Jul 30 X	Houston, TX	Jul 27–29	Live		Jason Sterner, USA (2) and Birgit Poppler, Germany	Joint open event with PWBA. $16,000 top prize.
PBA Xtra Frame Chesapeake Open	Aug 13 X	Chesapeake, VA	Aug 11–12	Live		Dick Allen, USA (4)	Open event. $10,000 top prize.
PBA International-WBT Storm Lucky Larsen Masters	N/A	Malmö, Sweden	Aug 15–26	Aug 27		Jason Belmonte, Australia (15)	WBT and PBA title event. 160,000 SEK (US$19,832) top prize.
PBA Xtra Frame Gene Carter's Pro Shop Classic	Aug 20 X	Middletown, DE	Aug 18–19	Live		Sean Rash, USA (12)	Open event. $15,000 top prize.
PBA Xtra Frame Kenn-Feld Group Classic	Aug 27 X	Coldwater, OH	Aug 25–26	Live		Rhino Page, USA (5)	Open event. $10,000 top prize.
PBA International WBT Thailand	N/A	Bangkok, Thailand	Sep 30 – Oct 5	Oct 6		Jojoe Yannaphon, Thailand (1)	WBT and PBA title event. ฿1,000,000 (US$32,255) top prize.
**73rd U.S. Open**	Nov 1 C	Liverpool, NY	Oct 25–31	Live	U.S. Open (custom)	Rhino Page, USA (6)	Open event. PBA major. $30,000 top prize.
PBA WSOB IX Chameleon Championship	Dec 17 E	Reno, NV	Nov. 8, 15	Nov. 18	Chameleon 39	Liz Johnson, USA (1)	Open event. $20,000 top prize.
PBA WSOB IX Shark Championship	Dec 17 E	Reno, NV	Nov. 9, 15	Nov. 18	Shark 45	Richie Teece, England (1)	Open event. $20,000 top prize.
PBA WSOB IX Cheetah Championship	Dec 24 E	Reno, NV	Nov. 11, 16	Nov. 19	Cheetah 33	Jesper Svensson, Sweden (7)	Open event. $20,000 top prize.
PBA WSOB IX Scorpion Championship	Dec 24 E	Reno, NV	Nov. 12, 16	Nov. 19	Scorpion 42	E. J. Tackett, USA (9)	Open event. $20,000 top prize.
**PBA World Championship**	Dec 31 E	Reno, NV	Nov 8–9, 11–14	Nov 19	World Championship	Jason Belmonte, Australia (16)	Open event for WSOB IX entrants. PBA major. $60,000 top prize.
WBT World Championships	Jan 7 E	Reno, NV	Season long	Nov 19		Women: Diana Zavjalova, Latvia Men: Jason Belmonte, Australia	WBT event held at WSOB.

- C: broadcast on CBS Sports Network
- E: broadcast on ESPN
- X: broadcast on the PBA's Xtra Frame webcast service
