= Michael Haugen Jr. =

American ten-pin bowler

Michael Haugen, Jr.
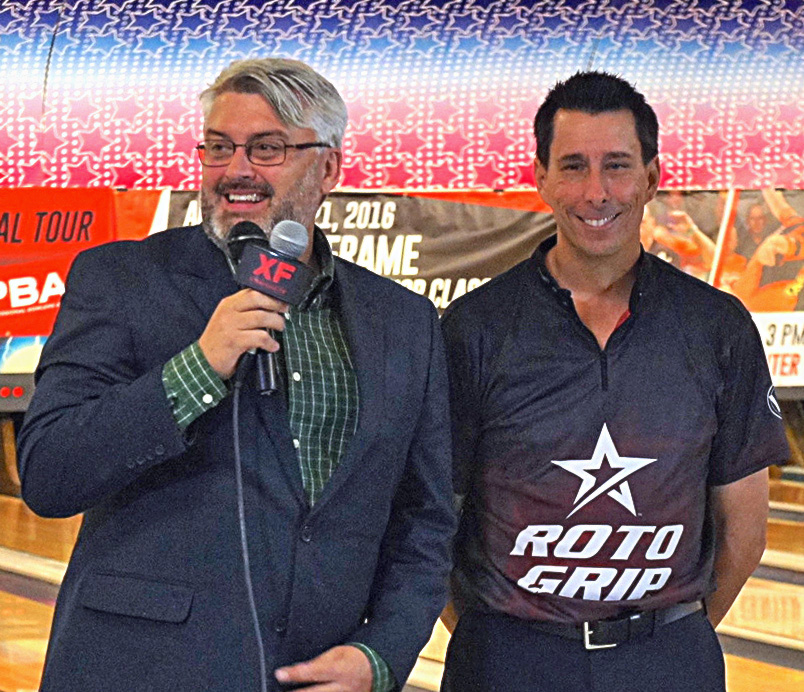
- Haugen being interviewed by Mike Jakubowski after a 2016 tournament win
- Born: Michael Haugen, Jr. December 29, 1966 (age 59)
- Occupation: Ten-pin bowler
- Years active: 1996–present
- Spouse: Phuong Truong

Michael Haugen Jr. (born December 29, 1966) is a right-handed professional ten-pin bowler residing in Carefree, Arizona. He is a member of the Professional Bowlers Association (PBA), having joined in 1994. He has won five PBA Tour titles overall, including a major title at the 2008 PBA Tournament of Champions. He owns a major title on the PBA50 Tour, having won the 2017 PBA Senior U.S. Open among his three PBA50 titles. Haugen has also earned 22 PBA Regional Tour titles and 8 PBA50 Regional Tour titles.

== Career ==
Haugen first joined the PBA in 1994, competing as a Regional pro. He bowled in selected PBA Tour events in the 1996 and 1997 seasons, before becoming a full-time bowler on tour in the 1998 season. He has a unique power-stroker style, with the starting position having the ball held low, and a final "plant step," meaning he does not slide to the foul line. He was named the PBA West Region Player of the Year in 1997. In the 2002–03 U.S. Open, he finished runner-up to Walter Ray Williams, Jr.

Early in the 2007–08 PBA season, he won the Lake County Indiana Classic in Merrillville, Indiana over Wes Malott. In doing so, he won his first tournament in 200 attempts and qualified for the Tournament of Champions. Later that season, he became the second bowler in history to win his first PBA title and the Tournament of Champions major in the same season, joining Joe Joseph who accomplished the feat in 1962. In the Tournament of Champions, as the number 1 seed, he completed a stunning comeback by defeating Chris Barnes in the final by one pin, after trailing by 53 pins in the sixth frame. A finger injury cut his season short as he was forced to miss the final seven events of the year, but he did manage to bowl in the Motel 6 "Roll to Riches" event in April 2008. His earnings in the 2007–08 season eclipsed $100,000 for the first time in his career.

Injuries again curtailed his 2008–09 season, as he was only able to compete in seven events. But he returned to start the 2009–10 season and made the TV finals for the PBA Viper Championship at the World Series of Bowling. He won his third PBA title at the Mark Roth Classic in Allen Park, Michigan on January 26, 2013.

Haugen won his fourth PBA title on November 2, 2014 in the Scorpion Championship at the World Series of Bowling in Las Vegas, Nevada. His fifth title was earned at the 2016 PBA Xtra Frame Gene Carter's Pro Shop Classic in Middletown, DE.

While still competing in selected events on the regular PBA Tour, Haugen also joined the PBA50 Tour (formerly PBA Senior Tour) in the 2017 season. He won his first PBA50 Tour title in a major tournament: the Suncoast PBA Senior U.S. Open held on June 16, 2017 in Las Vegas, NV. He was named 2017 PBA50 Tour Rookie of the Year.

Haugen won his second PBA50 Tour title on May 8, 2018 at the PBA50 Johnny Petraglia BVL Open, defeating Hall of Famer Walter Ray Williams Jr. in the final match. In July 2018, Haugen won his third PBA50 title at the River City Extreme Open. He was named PBA50 Player of the Year for 2018, locking up the points-based award with two tournaments remaining on the schedule. Haugen was the only player with two victories on the season, and also added two second-place and two third-place finishes. Haugen became the fourth PBA50 bowler to win both Rookie of the Year and Player of the Year awards in the same or consecutive years. Tom Baker and Norm Duke won both awards in the same year, while Mark Roth won the awards in consecutive years, like Haugen.

Through the end of the 2017 season, he had rolled 33 perfect 300 games in PBA events. He has accumulated over $830,000 in career PBA Tour earnings. In addition to his national tour victories, Haugen has won 23 PBA Regional Tour titles and six PBA50 Regional Tour titles.

== PBA Titles ==
Major tournaments are in bold type.

=== PBA Tour ===
1. 2007 Lake County Indiana Classic (Merrillville, IN)
2. **2008 PBA Tournament of Champions** (Las Vegas, NV)
3. 2013 Mark Roth Classic (Allen Park, MI)
4. 2014 PBA Scorpion Championship (Las Vegas, NV)
5. 2016 PBA Xtra Frame Gene Carter's Pro Shop Classic (Middletown, DE)

=== PBA50 Tour ===
1. **2017 Suncoast PBA Senior U.S. Open** (Las Vegas, NV)
2. 2018 PBA50 Johnny Petraglia BVL Open (Farmingdale, NY)
3. 2018 PBA50 River City Extreme Open (Monticello, MN)

== Awards ==
- 1997 PBA West Region Player of the Year
- 2017 PBA50 Rookie of the Year
- 2018 PBA50 Player of the Year

== Personal ==
He resides in Carefree, Arizona, and enjoys golfing and going to dance clubs. After qualifying for the TV finals at the 2014 PBA Scorpion Championship, Haugen told ESPN broadcasters he would propose on-air to longtime girlfriend Phuong Truong, only if he won the tournament. He made good on his promise during his post-tournament interview after his victory, and Truong joyously accepted.
