= 2015 PBA Tour season =

PBA Bowling Tour: 2015 Season
- League: Professional Bowlers Association
- Sport: Ten-pin bowling
- Duration: January 2 – December 18

PBA Tour
- Season MVP: Jason Belmonte

PBA Tour seasons
- ← 2014 2016 →

The 56th season of the Professional Bowlers Association (PBA) Tour was played in 2015. There were 27 singles title events, three doubles title events, and two team events on the 2015 schedule.

== Tournament schedule and recaps ==
For the seventh year in a row, the PBA held multiple fall North American events in one location, at the GEICO PBA World Series of Bowling VII (WSOB VII). Preliminary rounds and match play took place December 8 through December 14 in Reno, NV, and included four "animal" oil pattern events (Cheetah, Viper, Chameleon, and Scorpion). The four pattern tournaments in WSOB VII served as initial qualifying for the PBA World Championship. The top 25% of players in total pinfall (from a field of up to 312 participants) over the 36 games of qualifying (nine games per pattern tournament) moved on to the PBA World Championship cashers round and bowled an additional six games of qualifying on the PBA World Championship oil pattern to determine the top 24. Three additional match play rounds of eight games each determined the field for the five-player stepladder finals, which aired live in primetime on December 17 on ESPN. The finals for the four animal pattern tournaments were taped on December 18, and aired on consecutive Sundays on ESPN, beginning December 20.

Several international tour stops, which are part of the World Bowling Tour (WBT), were again part of the PBA schedule. As in 2014, a PBA title was awarded if any of these stops were won by a PBA member. In addition, some tournaments formerly consigned as PBA Regional tour stops qualified the winner to earn a PBA title. These are designated as "Xtra Frame" tournaments because they are broadcast exclusively (start-to-finish) on the PBA's Xtra Frame webcast service.

Returning to the PBA schedule in 2015 was the U.S. Open major, which was not played in 2014. The BPAA and USBC secured Bowlmor AMF bowling centers as the title sponsor for the 2015 event, which took place November 2–8 in Garland, Texas.

=== Season highlights ===
- Jason Belmonte, reigning 2012–13 and 2014 PBA Player of the Year, continued his stunning run of dominance in PBA majors. On February 8, he won the USBC Masters for an unprecedented third straight season. Only Mike Aulby has also won the Masters three times, but Aulby's wins were not in consecutive seasons. The following week, Belmonte also won the Barbasol Tournament of Champions for the second straight season. This marked Belmonte's tenth appearance in the TV finals over the last 12 majors and his fifth major tournament win.
- Also at the Barbasol Tournament of Champions, Sean Rash made history when he rolled the PBA's 25th televised perfect 300 game in the second match of the finals. Having also shot the PBA's 23rd televised 300 game in the 2014 PBA Wolf Open, Rash is the only player in history with two perfect games in the TV finals of a PBA tournament. Chris Barnes, the owner of the PBA's 22nd televised 300 games, rolled his second-ever perfect game in a PBA final at the DHC PBA Japan Invitational earlier this season, but that event was not televised in the U.S.
- The U.S. Open returned after a one-year hiatus and was held November 2–8 in Garland, Texas. Ryan Ciminelli emerged as champion, earning his fourth PBA title and first major championship.
- Rookie Gary Faulkner Jr. was the surprise winner of the season's final major, the PBA World Championship held in December in Reno, NV. Faulkner, who rose from the #3 seed and defeated top seed E. J. Tackett in the final match, became just the second African American to win a PBA title and a PBA major, following George Branham III who won five titles between 1986 and 1996, including the 1993 Tournament of Champions.
- In an extremely close vote, Jason Belmonte was honored as the Chris Schenkel PBA Player of the Year for the third straight season, getting 47.36 percent of the vote over Ryan Ciminelli's 43.22 percent. Belmonte won two titles (both majors), led the PBA Tour in earnings, finished in the Top Five in nine other tournaments, and edged Ciminelli in Tour average (225.40 to 225.37). This makes Belmonte the fourth PBA player to earn three consecutive POY awards, following Earl Anthony (who did it twice), Mark Roth and Walter Ray Williams, Jr. Runner-up Ciminelli was the only PBA player with three titles on the season (one being a major). Jesper Svensson, a two-time winner in 2015, was named PBA Rookie of the Year.

=== Tournament summary ===
Below is a schedule of events for the 2015 PBA Tour season. Major tournaments are in bold. Career PBA title numbers for winners are shown in parentheses (#).

Event	Airdate	City	Preliminary rounds	Final round	Oil pattern	Winner	Notes
PBA-WBT Brunswick Ballmaster Open	N/A	Helsinki, Finland	Jan 2–10	Jan 11		Paul Moor, England (1)	WBT and PBA title event. $15,325 first prize.
DHC PBA Japan Invitational 2015	Jan 17 X	Tokyo	Jan 14–17	Live		Chris Barnes, USA (18)	Invitational event. ¥5 million ($43,032) first prize. [+]
PBA Players Championship	Feb 22 E	Wauwatosa, WI	Jan 26–30	Feb 15 (Indianapolis)	Mark Roth	Parker Bohn III, USA (34)	Open event. $25,000 first prize.
Mark Roth/Marshall Holman PBA Doubles Championship	Mar 1 E	Wauwatosa, WI	Jan 26–30	Feb 15 (Indianapolis)	Mark Roth	Norm Duke, USA (38) and Wes Malott, USA (10)	Open event. $22,000 first prize.
**USBC Masters**	Feb 8 E	Green Bay, WI	Feb 1–7	Live	USBC Custom	Jason Belmonte, Australia (11)	Open event. PBA major. $50,000 first prize.
50th **Barbasol PBA Tournament of Champions**	Feb 15 E	Indianapolis, IN	Feb 10–14	Live	TOC Custom	Jason Belmonte, Australia (12)	Invitational event. PBA major. $50,000 first prize.
PBA-WBT H.H. Emir Cup	N/A	Doha, Qatar	Feb 24–26	Feb 27		Tannya Roumimper, Indonesia [F]	WBT and PBA title event. $25,000 first prize.
PBA-WBT Kingdom of Bahrain Open	N/A	Bahrain	Mar 3–6	Mar 7		Jesper Svensson, Sweden (1)	WBT and PBA title event. $25,000 first prize.
12th Kuwait International Open	N/A	Kuwait City	Mar 10–13	Mar 14		Brad Angelo, USA	Non-title event. $25,000 first prize.
PBA-WBT Brunswick Euro Challenge	N/A	Munich, Germany	Mar 15–21	Mar 22		Josh Blanchard, USA (1)	WBT and PBA title event. $12,000 first prize.
PBA League Elias Cup	Quarters: Mar 29 E Quarters: Apr 5 E Semis: Apr 12 E Finals: Apr 19 E	Portland, ME	Mar 28–29	Mar 30	Multiple	Bass Pro Shops Silver Lake Atom Splitters (Chris Barnes, Mika Koivuniemi, Dick Allen, Tom Daugherty, Craig Nidiffer; Coach: Mark Baker)	Non-title team event. $50,000 first prize.
PBA Xtra Frame Maine Shootout	Mar 31 X	Portland, ME	Mar 30	Live		Josh Blanchard, USA (2)	Open event. $10,000 first prize.
PBA Wolf Open	May 26 C	Shawnee, OK	May 11, 14	May 16	Wolf	Kyle Troup, USA (1)	Open event. $10,000 first prize.
PBA Bear Open	Jun 2 C	Shawnee, OK	May 12, 14	May 16	Bear	Tommy Jones, USA (16)	Open event. $10,000 first prize.
PBA Badger Open	Jun 9 C	Shawnee, OK	May 13, 14	May 16	Badger	Ronnie Russell, USA (3)	Open event. $10,000 first prize.
PBA Oklahoma Open	Jun 16 C	Shawnee, OK	May 11–15	May 17	Top seed Bill O'Neill chose Bear	Bill O'Neill, USA (6)	Top 18 from pattern events qualify. Top 5 after additional match play games advance to TV. $18,000 first prize.
Oklahoma's Grand Casino Resort "King of the Swing"	Jun 23 C	Shawnee, OK	May 11–17	May 17	Wolf (left lane), Badger (right lane)	Bill O'Neill, USA	Non-title stepladder final; four Summer Swing title winners plus "wild card" player (most event points among non-winners) compete for an additional $10,000.
PBA Xtra Frame Pensacola South Open	Jun 21 X	Pensacola, FL	Jun 19–20	Live	Bear	Andres Gomez, Colombia (3)	Open event. $10,000 first prize.
PBA Xtra Frame Lubbock Southwest Open	Jun 28 X	Lubbock, TX	Jun 26–27	Live	TOC	E. J. Tackett, USA (1)	Open event. $15,000 first prize.
WBT Bowling World Open	N/A	Tokyo	Jul 9–11	Jul 12		Osku Palermaa, Finland (5)	WBT and PBA title event. $81,000 first prize.
PBA Xtra Frame Striking Against Breast Cancer Mixed Doubles	Aug 2 X	Houston, TX	Jul 31 – Aug 1	Live		Bill O'Neill (7) and Shannon O'Keefe, USA	Open event. $15,000 first prize.
PBA/PBA50 Xtra Frame South Shore Doubles	Aug 8 X	Hammond, IN	Aug 6–7	Live	Scorpion	D. J. Archer (2) and Bob Learn, Jr., USA	Open event. $20,000 top prize.
PBA Xtra Frame Gene Carter's Pro Shop East Classic	Aug 23 X	Middletown, DE	Aug 21–22	Live	WC	Ryan Shafer, USA (5)	Open event. $15,000 top prize.
PBA Xtra Frame Iowa Midwest Open	Oct 11 X	Council Bluffs, IA	Oct 9–10	Live	Scorpion	Sean Rash, USA (9)	Open event. $10,000 first prize.
PBA Xtra Frame South Point Las Vegas Open	Oct 22 X	Las Vegas, NV	Oct 20–21	Live	Viper	Ryan Ciminelli, USA (3)	Open event. $10,000 first prize.
PBA Team Challenge	Oct 25 X	Las Vegas, NV	Oct 23–24	Live		Dead Money (Danielle McEwan, Alex Cavagnaro, Anthony Pepe, Matt McNeil, Matt O'Grady)	Non-title team event. $40,000 first prize.
**Bowlmor AMF U.S. Open**	Nov 8 C	Garland, TX	Nov 2–7	Live	U.S. Open Custom	Ryan Ciminelli, USA (4)	Open event. PBA major. $50,000 first prize.
PBA-WBT Qatar Open	N/A	Doha, Qatar	Nov 26 – Dec 1	Dec 2		Cameron Weier, USA (1)	WBT and PBA title event. $40,000 first prize.
PBA-WBT 9th Kingdom International Open	N/A	Riyadh, Saudi Arabia	Dec 3 – Dec 6	Dec 7		Francois Louw, South Africa	WBT and PBA title event. $25,000 first prize.
**Rolltech PBA World Championship**	Dec 17 E	Reno, NV	Dec 8–13	Live	Custom	Gary Faulkner Jr., USA (1)	Open event for WSOB entrants. PBA major. $60,000 first prize.
PBA Cheetah Championship	Dec 20 E	Reno, NV	Dec 8, 14	Dec 18	Cheetah	Parker Bohn III, USA (35)	Open event. $20,000 first prize.
GoBowling.com PBA Viper Championship	Dec 27 E	Reno, NV	Dec 9, 14	Dec 18	Viper	Ryan Ciminelli, USA (5)	Open event. $20,000 first prize.
PBA Chameleon Championship	Jan 3 E	Reno, NV	Dec 10, 15	Dec 18	Chameleon	Jesper Svensson, Sweden (2)	Open event. $20,000 first prize.
PBA Scorpion Championship	Jan 10 E	Reno, NV	Dec 11, 15	Dec 18	Scorpion	Jon Van Hees, USA (1)	Open event. $20,000 first prize.

- C: broadcast on CBS Sports Network
- E: broadcast on ESPN
- X: broadcast on the PBA's Xtra Frame webcast service

[+] Chris Barnes won an additional ¥5 million ($43,032) for rolling a 300 game in his semifinal match.
[F] Denotes female competitor. By tournament rules, female competitors receive 8 pins handicap per game in this tournament, and thus cannot be credited with a PBA title.
