= 2022 PBA Tour season =

- League: Professional Bowlers Association
- Sport: Ten-pin bowling
- Duration: January 15 – July 31

PBA Tour
- Season MVP: Jason Belmonte

PBA Tour seasons
- ← 2021 2023 →

The 2022 PBA Tour season, the 63rd season of play for the U.S. Professional Bowlers Association's ten-pin bowling tour, begins on January 15 with the Regional Portions of the PBA Players Championship. The season included 16 title events (14 singles, two doubles), three special non-title events, and the PBA League team event.

On January 5, 2022, the PBA announced that CEO Colie Edison resigned, having accepted the position of Chief Growth Officer for the WNBA. A successor to Edison has yet to be named.

== Season overview ==
The PBA opened the 2022 season, as it did in 2021, with the expanded PBA Players Championship. Five Regional events (East, South, Midwest, Southwest and West) were hosted first, with each Region holding a televised stepladder final round on FS1. The five Regional winners then competed in the tournament finals held in Euless, Texas on January 29.

The Tour's other four major championships (U.S. Open, Tournament of Champions, PBA World Championship and USBC Masters) are all contested within the first 13 events of the season. The PBA League team competition returns in July, after a one-year hiatus. All five majors and the PBA Tour Playoffs offer a $100,000 top prize, marking the first time in PBA history that six events have paid out a six-figure first place check.

The season currently has 36 broadcasts scheduled, including 25 on FS1, four on Fox, two on CBS Sports Network and five on the FloBowling web channel. Fox is scheduled to broadcast the stepladder finals of three major tournaments (Tournament of Champions, PBA World Championship and USBC Masters), plus the final round of the PBA Tour Playoffs.

On November 17, 2021, the PBA announced that Pabst Blue Ribbon will be a title sponsor as “official beer” for the 2022 PBA Tour. During the season (except for the Collegiate Invitational where regulations on alcohol advertising are in effect as many players are under 21 years of age and for amateurism regulations, as men's bowling is governed by the USBC, not the NCAA), Fox Sports broadcasts will feature a “PBR 6-Pack Alert” whenever a bowler achieves five strikes in a row. If the bowler gets the sixth consecutive strike following the alert, he will win a $1,000 bonus. If the sixth strike is not achieved, $500 is added to the jackpot for when the next 6-Pack Alert comes around, and Pabst will continue adding $500 each time the alert appears and the sixth strike is not achieved.

Storm Bowling sponsors four events in the 2022 season that make up the Storm Cup series: David Small's Best of the Best Championship (Feb. 7–9), David Small's PBA Kokomo Championship (Feb. 14–16), Lubbock Sports Open (Mar. 18–20) and Colorado Springs Open (Mar. 22–24). Each event awards a PBA title, $20,000 top prize, and Tier 3 Tour points. The top five players in points over the four events will share in a $25,000 bonus pool, with $10,000 going to the player (Jason Belmonte) with the most points. All four events are live-streamed exclusively on the FloBowling Web channel.

The PBA League returns July 6–10 after a one-year hiatus, and features ten teams. In a change from previous events, each player on a team bowls a full game in the division qualifying round. Teams are seeded for the division stepladder based on total team scores, and the six highest-scoring bowlers from each division are awarded spots in the Strike Derby, which takes place in the same location. The division stepladders and Elias Cup Finals will still use the traditional Baker game format.

=== Season awards ===
End-of-season awards announced on November 2–4, 2022:

- Chris Schenkel PBA Player of the Year: Jason Belmonte
- Harry Smith PBA Points Leader Award: Jason Belmonte
- Harry Golden PBA Rookie of the Year: Santtu Tahvanainen
- George Young High Average Award: E. J. Tackett
- PBA Steve Nagy Sportsmanship Award: Jake Peters
- PBA Tony Reyes Community Service Award: Ryan Shafer

== Tournament summary ==
The events for the 2022 PBA tournament schedule are shown below. Major tournaments are in bold. Career PBA title numbers for winners are shown in parentheses (#). Winner's share prize money is shown in US dollars ($), except where indicated.

Tour points are awarded for most events. Besides the season-ending Harry Smith PBA Points Winner award, points are one consideration for Player of the Year voting, and also affect eligibility for the PBA Tour Playoffs, PBA Tour Finals (combined with 2021 points), and the 2023 DHC PBA Japan Invitational. Points for tournaments are awarded differently based on a "tier" system. The tier of each qualifying tournament is shown in the Notes column on the tournament schedule, and is explained below.

- Tier 3: PBA short format or limited field tournaments (2500 points for first, and descending thereafter)
- Tier 2: PBA standard tournaments with a fully open field (double the points of Tier 3 events)
- Tier 1: PBA major tournaments (triple the points of Tier 3 events)

Event	Airdate	City	Preliminary rounds	Final round	Oil pattern	Winner	Notes
**PBA Players Championship presented by Snickers**	East Region Finals: Jan 22 FS1; South Region Finals: Jan 22 FS1; Midwest Region Finals: Jan 23 FS1; Southwest Region Finals: Jan 23 FS1; West Region Finals: Jan 24 FS1; Championship Finals: Jan 29 FS1	Euless, TX	Jan 14–16 (all regions)	Live	Qualifying: Chameleon 39, Don Johnson 40, Dragon 45; Regional & Championship Finals: Dragon 45 (left lane), Chameleon 39 (right lane)	(Australia) Jason Belmonte (26)	Open PBA members-only event (Tier 1). PBA major. Five Regional winners compete on January 29 for a $100,000 top prize.
**U.S. Open**	Feb 6 FS1	Indianapolis, IN	Feb 1–5 (PTQ: Jan 30)	Live	4 custom patterns, ranging 37 to 45 feet	(Texas) Anthony Simonsen (9)	Open event (Tier 1). PBA major. $100,000 top prize.
Storm Cup: PBA David Small's Best of the Best Championship	Feb 9 FloBowling	Jackson, MI	Feb 8–9 (PTQ: Feb 7)	Live	Viper 36	(Sweden) Jesper Svensson (11)	Open event (Tier 3-short format). $20,000 top prize.
Storm Cup: PBA David Small's Kokomo Championship	Feb 16 FloBowling	Kokomo, IN	Feb 14–15	Live	Bear 41	(Australia) Jason Belmonte (27)	Open event (Tier 3-short format). $20,000 top prize.
**Kia PBA Tournament of Champions**	Feb 27 Fox	Fairlawn, OH	Feb 23–26 (PTQ: Feb 21)	Live	Don Johnson 40	(United Kingdom) Dominic Barrett (9)	Invitational event (Tier 1). PBA major. $100,000 top prize.
PBA WSOB XIII Roth-Holman Doubles Championship	Mar 6 FS1	Wauwatosa, WI	Mar 4–5 (PTQ: Mar 3)	Live	Mark Roth 42 & Marshall Holman 38 (PTQ: Bear 41)	(Indiana) E. J. Tackett (15) (Washington (state)) Marshall Kent (5)	Open event-limited field (Tier 3). $25,000 top prize.
**PBA World Championship presented by Pabst Blue Ribbon**	Mar 13 Fox	Wauwatosa, WI	Mar 7–11	Live	Qualifying: Cheetah 35, Scorpion 42, Shark 48; Cashers round thru finals: Earl Anthony 43	(Illinois) Kristopher Prather (5)	Open event for WSOB entrants (Tier 1). PBA major. $100,000 top prize.
PBA WSOB XIII Cheetah Championship	Mar 14 FS1	Wauwatosa, WI	Mar 7, 14	Live	Cheetah 35	(Missouri) Kyle Sherman (2)	Open event (Tier 3-short format). $20,000 top prize.
PBA WSOB XIII Scorpion Championship	Mar 15 FS1	Wauwatosa, WI	Mar 8, 15	Live	Scorpion 42	(Australia) Jason Belmonte (28)	Open event (Tier 3-short format). $20,000 top prize.
PBA WSOB XIII Shark Championship	Mar 16 FS1	Wauwatosa, WI	Mar 9, 16	Live	Shark 48	(Missouri) Keven Williams (1)	Open event (Tier 3-short format). $20,000 top prize.
PBA WSOB XIII Collegiate Invitational presented by Storm	Mar 20 FS1	Wauwatosa, WI	Mar 17	Mar 17	Carmen Salvino 44	(Kansas) Wichita State Shockers	Special event featuring top four college bowling teams (by USBC ranking), presented by the PBA.
Storm Cup: Lubbock Sports Open	Mar 20 FloBowling	Lubbock, TX	Mar 18–19	Live	Carmen Salvino 44	(Australia) Jason Belmonte (29)	Open event (Tier 3-short format). $20,000 top prize.
Storm Cup: Colorado Springs Open	Mar 24 FloBowling	Colorado Springs, CO	Mar 22–23	Live	Wayne Webb 38	(United Kingdom) Dominic Barrett (10)	Open event (Tier 3-short format). $20,000 top prize.
**USBC Masters**	Apr 3 Fox	Las Vegas, NV	Mar 29–Apr 2	Live	USBC custom (40 ft.)	(Texas) Anthony Simonsen (10)	Open event (Tier 1). PBA major. $100,000 top prize.
Kia PBA Playoffs	Round of 16 (1 & 2): Apr 10 FS1; Round of 16 (3 & 4): Apr 16 & 17 FS1; Quarterfinals 1: Apr 24 FS1; Quarterfinals 2: May 1 FS1; Semifinals: May 8 Fox; Finals: May 15 Fox	Lake Wales, FL & Jupiter, FL	Apr 10–12, May 8	Live	Don Carter 39	(North Carolina) Kyle Troup (9)	Invitational event. Starting field includes top 16 players in 2022 season points through the USBC Masters. $100,000 top prize.
PBA Tour Finals	Seeding Rounds: Jun 4 CBS Sports; Group Stepladders & Finals: Jun 5 CBS Sports	Arlington, WA	Live	Live	Marshall Holman 38 & Johnny Petraglia 46	(Australia) Jason Belmonte (30)	Invitational event. Starting field includes Top 8 players in Tour points since start of 2021 season. $30,000 top prize.
PBA King of the Lanes: Royal Family Edition	Jun 6–8 FS1	Jupiter, FL	Taped	Taped	Carmen Salvino 44	Carolyn Dorin-Ballard & Alyssa Ballard	Non-title event. Current and former PBA champions pair with their children. Initial Kings: Guppy and Kyle Troup.
PBA King of the Lanes	Jun 9–10 FS1	Jupiter, FL	Taped	Taped	Carmen Salvino 44	(North Carolina) Kyle Troup	Non-title event. Norm Duke and PBA Regional Players Invitational champ Carlos Granados compete to take on reigning King Jason Sterner. King match winner then faces winner of a match between PBA Playoffs finalists (Kyle Troup and Tommy Jones).
PBA League presented by Pabst Blue Ribbon	Anthony Division Finals: Jul 6 FS1; Carter Division Finals: Jul 7 FS1; Elias Cup Finals: Jul 10 FS1	Portland, ME	Seeding rounds: Jul 6 & 7 (not aired)	Live	Mark Roth 42	Portland Lumberjacks Kyle Troup (MVP), Wes Malott, Kris Prather, Packy Hanrahan, Arturo Quintero, Mgr. Tim Mack	Non-title team event. 10 team starting field. $75,000 top prize (team).
PBA League Strike Derby presented by Pabst Blue Ribbon	Jul 16 FS1	Portland, ME	N/A	Live	Mark Roth 42	(North Carolina) Kyle Troup, Portland Lumberjacks	Non-title event. Top 6 players per Division from PBA League seeding round. $25,000 top prize.
PBA League All-Star Clash presented by Pabst Blue Ribbon	Jul 17 FS1	Portland, ME	N/A	Jul 16	Mark Roth 42	(Nevada) Jake Peters, Chicago Hitmen	Non-title event. Top scoring player from each PBA League team during seeding round. $15,000 top prize to player, plus $3,000 each to player's teammates and manager.
PBA-PWBA Striking Against Breast Cancer Mixed Doubles (a.k.a. The Luci)	Jul 31 Bowl TV	Houston, TX	Jul 28–30	Live	Custom Kegel design	(Indiana) E. J. Tackett (16) (Illinois) Diandra Asbaty	Open PBA and PWBA title event. Tier 3-limited field. $20,000 top prize.
