= Jason Belmonte =

Australian professional ten-pin bowler (born 1983)

Jason Belmonte AM
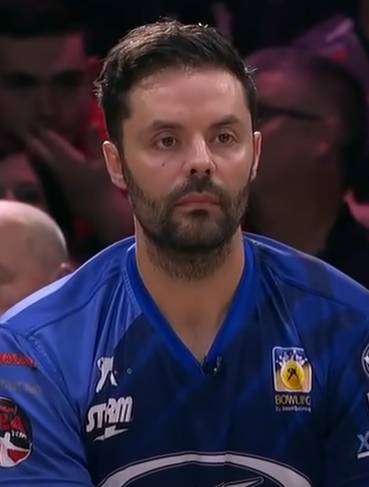
- Belmonte during the 2019 PBA World Championship

Personal information
- Nickname: Belmo
- Born: 29 July 1983 (age 43) Orange, New South Wales, Australia
- Years active: 2000–present
- Height: 178 cm (5 ft 10 in)
- Spouse: Kimberly Shapter
- Children: 4

Sport
- Country: Australia
- Sport: Ten-pin bowling
- League: PBA, WBT
- Turned pro: 2008

Achievements and titles
- World finals: 1 European Bowling Tour; 1 World Tenpin Masters; 1 WBT; 1 AMF World Cup
- National finals: 32 PBA Tour (15 majors); 7x PBA Player of the Year; PBA Super Slam winner
Medal record
Representing Australia
Bowling
Event	1st	2nd	3rd
World Tenpin Bowling Championships	–	–	4
World Youth Bowling Championships	3	1	–
Asian Youth Bowling Championships	3	1	1
Total	6	2	5
World Tenpin Bowling Championships
Bronze medal – third place	2006 Busan	Doubles
Bronze medal – third place	2006 Busan	Masters
Bronze medal – third place	2014 Abu Dhabi	Trios
Bronze medal – third place	2014 Abu Dhabi	Team
World Youth Tenpin Bowling Championships
Gold medal – first place	2006 Berlin	Team
Gold medal – first place	2004 Guam	Singles
Gold medal – first place	2004 Guam	All Events
Silver medal – second place	2004 Guam	Masters

Jason Belmonte AM (born 29 July 1983) is an Australian professional ten-pin bowler. He plays on the PBA Tour in the United States and in world events. He is known for being one of the first bowlers to gain media attention for using the two-handed approach style to deliver his shot. He has won 32 PBA titles (seventh most all-time), including a record 15 major championships; he is only one of eight bowlers in PBA tour history to achieve 30 wins, making him the only 30-time winner in PBA Tour history who is not currently a member of the PBA Hall of Fame (he will be eligible in 2028).

Belmonte is one of two bowlers in PBA history to have won the Super Slam, winning all five PBA major titles (the other being Mike Aulby). He is the all-time leader in both USBC Masters and PBA Tournament of Champions titles, winning each event four times. He is also the only three-time winner of the PBA Players Championship.

Belmonte has been named PBA Player of the Year seven times, tying the record previously set by Walter Ray Williams Jr., and he is one of five bowlers (with Earl Anthony, Mark Roth, Williams and E. J. Tackett) to win that award in three consecutive seasons (2013–2015). He won all seven PoY awards in a ten-season stretch (2012–13 to 2022), during which he became the most dominant player on tour.

Belmonte accumulated $1 million (USD) in career PBA earnings faster than any player in history (131 tournaments). He eclipsed $3 million in PBA earnings during the 2026 season. Belmonte has at least 27 career 300 games in PBA Tour events through 2023, including the PBA's 21st nationally televised 300 in 2012, as well as the 34th nationally televised 300 over ten years later in 2022. He rolled another televised 300 game in the 2023 PBA Tour Finals to become the only player in PBA history with three televised perfect games. He is considered one of the greatest bowlers of all time.

Belmonte is perhaps the most well-marketed bowler of all time, owing in part to his popularisation of two-handed bowling. He is a member of the Storm, 3G Shoes and Vise Grips pro staffs. Storm has collaborated with Belmonte to develop the "Signature" line of bowling balls, which bear the Belmo nickname and silhouette logo.

He was appointed a Member of the Order of Australia (AM) in the 2022 Queen's Birthday Honours for significant service to tenpin bowling at the elite level.

== Early life ==
Jason Belmonte was born on 29 July 1983 in Orange, New South Wales, Australia. His father Aldo opened the Orange Ten Pin Bowl when Jason was a toddler. As a result, Jason started rolling a ball at 18 months old. Interviewed in 2009, he commented: "The only problem for me though was as an 18-month-old baby boy lifting a nine- to 10-pound (4–4.5 kg) bowling ball ... it was a little hard, so like all babies I pushed the ball with two hands." In doing so he developed a two-handed style which he uses today, placing only two fingers and no thumb in the ball to produce more revolutions. He reports having tried one-handed bowling when he was 7, but concluded that it "sucked".

== Professional growth ==
When Belmonte first joined the PBA, he focused on power (thinking "let’s break some pins"). After studying other professionals who "had the ability to make the ball dance", he simplified his delivery: decreasing his rev rate, ball speed, and approach speed; eliminating a "kangaroo hop"; and releasing from a more stable position. As a result, his accuracy in hitting the pocket improved while he continued to strike with 20% lower rev rate.

In 2022, his parents' bowling centre installed a ball tracking system that records ball path, speed, and rev rate, Belmonte saying "it's scarily accurate". As of 2023, Belmonte travels with about 15 bowling balls of various construction.

Noting Belmonte's recognition within the bowling industry and controversy over his two-handed style which some have called cheating, GQ magazine said in 2023 that Belmonte had become both an elder statesman at 39 and a polarising figure. He remarked on his sometime loneliness—also spending six months of the year away from family—but said "there’s an abundance of love there" as well.

== Titles ==
Belmonte has won one European Bowling Tour title, the Brunswick Euro Challenge, held in Greece. He also won the World Tenpin Masters championship in 2007. In September 2010, he defeated American Sean Rash in the finals to earn the 2010 Korea Cup title.

On the PBA Tour, Belmonte owns 32 titles (7th on the PBA's all-time list), including his first title at the Bowling Foundation Long Island Classic (2009), and three titles in the 2011–12 season (GEICO Shark Open, World Series of Bowling Chameleon Open, and the Pepsi PBA Elite Players Championship). After making the televised finals in five of six PBA majors without winning, he defeated Wes Malott to capture his first PBA major title: the 2012–13 USBC Masters. (Belmonte would be retroactively awarded a major title for the 2011 Elite Players Championship, making the USBC Masters his second major.) He captured his third major at the 2014 Barbasol Tournament of Champions, again defeating Malott in the title match. On 8 February 2015, Belmonte became the first bowler to win three consecutive USBC Masters tournaments after defeating No. 1 seeded AJ Johnson. On 15 February 2015, he defeated No. 1 seed Rhino Page to capture his second consecutive Barbasol Tournament of Champions title, and his second major title in two weeks. After winning three major titles in 2017, including an unprecedented fourth USBC Masters, Belmonte stood in second place on the all-time PBA majors list with nine, behind only Earl Anthony and Pete Weber, who both have ten. He won the first major of 2019, the PBA Tournament of Champions, to tie the record with ten majors. One month later, Belmonte won the 2019 PBA World Championship, making him the all-time major titles leader. In February 2020, Belmonte won the U.S. Open to claim the "super slam" (a title in all five PBA majors), the second in PBA history after Mike Aulby.

Based on a points system that took into account standard titles, major titles, top-five finishes and Player of the Year awards, Belmonte easily ranked #1 on the PBA's 2025 "Best 25 PBA Players of the Last 25 Seasons" list. His 450.5 points were over 100 more than second-ranked E. J. Tackett (327.5).

== Bowling career ==
=== Amateur and international accomplishments ===
Aged seventeen, Belmonte became the first Junior Australian to bowl a 300 game overseas. He also took five gold medals at the 2000 Junior National Championships, was selected for the Youth Australia team, and also held a place in this team in 2002 and 2004. Belmonte was awarded the 2001 Orange Junior Sportsperson of the Year and won the 2002 Senior Award. He also was awarded the Orange Sportsperson of the Year award in both 2002 and 2003. Belmonte won one gold, one silver and two bronze medals at the 2002 Commonwealth Championships in Scotland. Belmonte competed in Fédération Internationale des Quilleurs (FIQ) tournaments (the governing body of the sport and now known as International Bowling Federation (IBF)) such as the World Tenpin Bowling Association (WTBA) and Asian FIQ championships. He won a silver medal at the WTBA World Youth Championships in Thailand. Later in the year, he was selected in the Australian Open men's team, where he remains to the present time.

In 2004, Belmonte took three gold, one silver and one bronze the Asian Youth FIQ in Hong Kong and followed this up in the World Youth FIQ titles in Guam with a gold in the singles and a gold in all events. He won the prestigious 2004 Bowler of the Year award, voted by the Board of Directors of the World Bowlers Writers' Association.

Belmonte was invited to participate in the 2005 World Tenpin Masters in England where he was defeated in the semi-finals. In this event, he made history by bowling the first-ever 300 game in the event. The game was filmed by Matchroom Sport. In 2007, Belmonte was once again invited to take part in the World Tenpin Masters, held at the Barnsley Metrodome. After defeating the defending champion Chris Barnes of the United States in the semi-finals, Belmonte went on to defeat England's Paul Moor in the finals where he rolled the event's second-ever 300 game. Belmonte rolled 23 out of a possible 24 strikes to win the event with a 566 score for two games, against Moor's 524.

Belmonte represented Australia in the 2006 World Youth Championships in Berlin. He was part of the team to take the gold medal in the Team Event and went on to make the Masters after finishing in sixth place in the All Events. He was defeated in the second step of the Masters by the eventual winner, Mads Sandbaekken from Norway. He also competed in the adult version on the same year at Men's World Championship at the Asiad Bowling Center in Busan, Korea and went on to make the Masters match-play after finishing 4th. He lost to eventual winner Biboy Rivera from Philippines to take the bronze medal.

Belmonte participated in the 2007 World Ranking Masters and after qualifying in second position, was defeated in the quarter finals by eventual runner-up Peter Ljung from Sweden, 2–0 (190–258, 158–279), finishing in sixth place.

In 2011, in the World Bowling Tour, Belmonte defeated good friend and PBA Player Mike Fagan, a two-game match scoring 511–505, to win the PTT World Bowling Tour Thailand 2011.

In 2022, Belmonte defeated Kyle Troup, 259-236, to win the 2022 Devil's Lair Tasmania.

=== AMF World Cup ===
Jason Belmonte competed in the 2004 AMF World Cup in Singapore and led all five days of qualifying events. He finished in fifth place after being knocked out in the quarter final.

Belmonte competed again in the 2007 AMF World Cup in St. Petersburg, Russia where he was also lead qualifier. He finished runner-up after he was defeated in the final by Bill Hoffman (USA). As a result, Belmonte won the country rankings for Australia with Ann-Maree Putney, who won the trophy in the women's world cup.

In his third appearance in the 2011 AMF World Cup in Johannesburg, South Africa he was crowned as AMF Bowling World Cup champion. His first match was against Mykhaylo Kalika (Ukraine). Belmonte won the first game 237–203 and Kalika won the second game 248–266. Belmonte would win the deciding game 266–185. Jason Belmonte then came up against first seed Tommy Jones (USA). Jones would win the first game 259–279 with Belmonte winning the second, 247–216. After Jones opened in the eighth frame, Belmonte defeated him in the third game 259–236 and became the first Australian man to take the title. His three-game total of 765 was a new finals record, beating the previous mark of 764 by Petter Hansen (Norway), set in Singapore in 2004.

Belmonte stated "I was a long way in the lead in 2004 in Singapore, and got knocked in the quarters," he said, "and again I led the field in St Petersburg in 2007 and then I lost in the final. So I was happy to go in as number two seed this time".

=== PBA Tour ===
==== 2008–09: Rookie of the Year ====
In 2008, then-deputy PBA Commissioner Tom Clark granted Belmonte a one-time "commissioner's exemption", guaranteeing his entry into a PBA tournament. Though Belmonte was not the first two-hand-delivery bowler—Chuck Lande and Osku Palermaa preceded him—Clark later reflected that because of his bowling style, Belmonte "had the best story, the best media potential". While questioning whether he could maintain the physical demands of two-hand deliveries—once calling himself a crash test dummy—Belmonte achieved his first win in his eighth PBA tournament.

In 2009, Belmonte won the Bowling Foundation Long Island Classic PBA Tour event in his PBA TV finals debut. As the second seed, he defeated Bill O'Neill, and went on to defeat number one seed Mike Fagan 215–201 for his first PBA title. The title earned Belmonte "exempt" status for the 2009–10 PBA Tour, and he was also named the 2008–09 PBA Rookie of the Year.

==== 2009–10 ====
2009–10 marked his first season as an exempt PBA bowler. Belmonte qualified for the TV finals in three events, but did not win a tournament. He came close at the GEICO Mark Roth Plastic Ball Championship on 28 March 2010. Finishing as the top qualifier, he faced Brian Ziesig in the finals. Ziesig was a non-exempt amateur who had to qualify via the TQR round. The two were tied at the end of the regulation game, 247–247, which sent the championship to a sudden-death, one-ball rolloff. Belmonte's shot on his first attempt left a solid 7-pin standing. Ziesig then threw a strike to take the title.

==== 2010–11 ====
In the 2010–11 season, Belmonte appeared in 10 of 12 PBA events, making match-play nine times and appearing on TV four times. Without a victory, he had earnings of US$62,950, while averaging 218.82 pins per game. In his first three years on tour, Belmonte cashed in 33 of 37 tournaments, making match-play a total of 25 times, with eight television appearance; and earnings of US$187,420.

==== 2011–12: Return to victory ====
Belmonte won his second, third and fourth PBA titles in November 2011. The first two were earned at the PBA World Series of Bowling, as he took the trophies in the Chameleon Open and GEICO Shark Open, and the third was earned at the Pepsi PBA Elite Players Championship. Belmonte also rolled a nationally televised 300 game in the quarterfinals of the PBA World Championship, broadcast on 8 January 2012 in North America; however, he did not go on to win the tournament. Despite his three titles in the 2011–12 season, Belmonte did not win the PBA Player of the Year honors. The award was won by Sean Rash in an extremely close vote (Rash received 29% of the vote to Belmonte's 26.6%).

With his home crowd watching, Belmonte defeated Sean Rash in a best-of-three final (174–172, 223–255, 256–243) for his fifth PBA title at the 2012 Australian Masters in Sydney, Australia.

==== 2012–13: Player of the Year ====
On 24 February 2013, Belmonte won his sixth PBA Tour title and first PBA major at the USBC Masters in North Brunswick, NJ. Belmonte finished with six consecutive strikes in the dramatic final match to top Wes Malott, 258–245. Belmonte won a second title on the 2012–13 season, his seventh overall, at the PBA Lucas Oil Bear Open in Wauwatosa, Wisconsin. He was runner-up to Wes Malott in the 2013 U.S. Open. It marked his seventh appearance in the TV finals of a major over the last eight major tournaments.

On 17 January 2014, Belmonte was named the Chris Schenkel PBA Player of the Year for the 2012–13 season. Along with two titles for the season, including a major title and runner-up finishes at three other major championships, Belmonte won the George Young High Average Award ( a PBA record 228.81) and the Harry Smith Points Leader Award (238,903). He became only the third PBA player born outside the USA (after Amleto Monacelli and Mika Koivuniemi) to win PBA Player of the Year.

==== 2014: Major success, Player of the Year Repeat ====
Belmonte won the first tournament of the 2014 PBA season, the Barbasol Tournament of Champions in Allen Park, Michigan, which marked his second major tournament win and eighth title overall. As he did in his first major championship win, Belmonte defeated Wes Malott, this time in a 219–218 single game match. On 23 February 2014, he became the first player to repeat as USBC Masters champion in nearly 50 years, and also the first player in history to win a major as the 5th seed, defeating every rival in the championship stepladder final. (Billy Welu won back-to-back Masters in 1964–65.) This was Belmonte's ninth PBA title and third major. He captured his tenth title winning the Oklahoma Open during the PBA's Summer Swing.

His three titles (two majors) in the 2014 season made him an easy choice to win his second consecutive Chris Schenkel PBA Player of the Year award. In doing so, he became the first bowler to repeat as Player of the Year since Walter Ray Williams, Jr. won three consecutive awards from 1996 to 1998. Belmonte led all bowlers in season earnings ($163,788), average (226.71) and competition points (136,454).

==== 2015: Player of the Year Three-Peat ====
Belmonte again won the USBC Masters on 8 February 2015, defeating amateur A.J. Johnson, a surprise #1 seed, in the final match, 202–157. In doing so, he joined Mike Aulby as the only three-time winners of this tournament, while becoming the only player to win the Masters in three consecutive seasons. On 15 February 2015, in Indianapolis, he captured his 12th PBA title by winning the Barbasol Tournament of Champions for the second consecutive season. As in the USBC Masters, Belmonte won from the #2 seed position, knocking off #4 seed Sean Rash in the semifinals, 235–203, before defeating top seed Rhino Page in the final match, 232–214. It was Belmonte's tenth appearance in the TV finals over the last 12 PBA major tournaments, and his fifth win in a major.

On 20 January 2016, Belmonte was named the Chris Schenkel PBA Player of the Year for 2015, the third consecutive season he won the award. In addition to his two major tournament wins, he had nine other Top Five finishes, led the PBA Tour in earnings ($178,542) and was fourth in average (225.4). He became the first non-American player to win three consecutive POY honors, and the fourth PBA player overall to do so (joining Earl Anthony, Mark Roth and Walter Ray Williams, Jr.).

==== 2016 ====
Belmonte made the five-player stepladder finals as the #3 seed for the 2016 PBA Fire Lake Tournament of Champions, seeking to join Jason Couch as the only players to win in this tournament in three consecutive seasons, but he was knocked off in the second match of the finals by Tom Daugherty. His bid for an unprecedented fourth USBC Masters title the following week also fell short, as he made the Round of 8 but was defeated by Wes Malott in the winner's bracket and Martin Larsen in the loser's bracket, keeping him out of the TV finals.

On 15 February 2016, Belmonte was retroactively awarded a major title for his 2011 PBA Elite Players Championship victory. After the tournament returned to major status in the 2016 season, the PBA voted to award additional major titles to the winners of the three previous Players Championship events (2011, 2013, 2015), stating the tournament "is a members-only event, and includes all of the elements of a major." This gave Belmonte six majors among his PBA Tour titles.

==== 2017: Three Majors in One Year ====
On 12 February 2017, Belmonte won his 13th PBA title and seventh major in the PBA Players Championship held in Columbus, Ohio. Having qualified as the #1 seed, he defeated #2 seed Anthony Simonsen in his lone TV finals match. On 26 February, as the #1 seed again, he defeated Michael Tang to win his 14th PBA title, fourth USBC Masters title, and his eighth major title, becoming the only bowler to ever win four USBC Masters titles. As one of the top eight money leaders from the start of the 2015 season through the 2017 USBC Masters, Belmonte was invited to participate in the inaugural Main Event PBA Tour Finals in May 2017. Starting as the #1 seed, Jason finished runner-up to E. J. Tackett. Belmonte won his 15th PBA Tour title on 27 August 2017 at the PBA International-WBT Storm Lucky Larsen Masters, held in Malmö, Sweden. On 19 November, Belmonte won the PBA World Championship in Reno, NV for his 16th title and ninth career major. With the win, Belmonte became the first PBA player to ever win three major titles in a season.

Belmonte swept the three major PBA statistical categories for the 2017 season, including a PBA-record 229.39 average for 380 games. He also finished first in earnings ($238,912) and tied for first in wins (4). On 17 January, in a landslide vote, Belmonte won with his fourth PBA Player of the Year Award.

Also in 2017, Belmonte won the Dick Weber Bowling Ambassador Award, an honour given annually by the Bowling Proprietors Association of America (BPAA) to the "bowling athlete who has consistently shown grace on and off the lanes by promoting the sport of bowling in a positive manner."

==== 2018 ====
Belmonte collected his 17th PBA title on 25 February 2018, winning the Roth/Holman PBA Doubles Championship with partner Bill O'Neill.

Belmonte qualified as the #1 seed in the 2018 PBA Tour Finals, held 4–6 May in Allen Park, Michigan, and earned a rematch against last season's Finals champion, E. J. Tackett. Belmonte avenged his 2017 loss to Tackett for his 18th PBA Tour title.

==== 2019: Making History, Player of the Decade ====
On 10 February 2019, Belmonte won his 19th PBA title and tenth major at the PBA Tournament of Champions held in Fairlawn, Ohio. As the #1 seed, he defeated E. J. Tackett 225–196 in the final match to claim the title. Belmonte's victory made him the third player to win three Tournament of Champions after Mike Durbin and Jason Couch, and tied him with Earl Anthony and Pete Weber as the all-time major titles leader (10 majors). Belmonte was also the top qualifier in the 2019 season's next two events – the PBA Players Championship and PBA Indianapolis Open – but he failed to win either event. At the Players Championship, a pair of 7-10 splits – once in the fourth frame and again in the tenth – cost him the match against Anthony Simonsen. At the Indianapolis Open, a few off-hits that refused to carry – once in the eighth frame and again in the tenth – handed the title to Norm Duke. He joined Johnny Petraglia, Earl Anthony, Walter Ray Williams Jr. and Jakob Butturff as the only players in history to qualify as the #1 seed in three consecutive PBA Tour events.

On 19 March 2019, Belmonte captured his 20th PBA title at the PBA Chameleon Championship, part of the 2019 World Series of Bowling in Allen Park, Michigan. He qualified as the #2 seed in the stepladder finals, defeating A.J. Chapman in the semifinal match, then Andres Gomez in the title match.

Two days later on 21 March, Belmonte won his 21st PBA title and record-breaking 11th major at the 2019 PBA World Championship, also part of the World Series of Bowling. Having earned the #1 seed for the stepladder finals, a record third consecutive major in which he was the top qualifier, he defeated Jakob Butturff 236–227 in the championship match to win the title. With his victory, Belmonte now stands alone as the all-time PBA and professional bowling leader in major titles, surpassing Earl Anthony and Pete Weber (who have 10 majors each).

Belmonte's streak of three consecutive majors in which he qualified as the top seed ended at the 2019 USBC Masters. He suffered a finger injury in a pre-tournament charity event, forcing him to alter his grip on the bowling ball, and finished well out of the top 64 that made match play.

Belmonte qualified as the #1 seed for the inaugural PBA Tour Playoffs held in Portland, Maine. He defeated Kyle Troup in the Round of 16 two games to one, but was then eliminated in the Round of 8 by Kris Prather, losing both matches.

On 28 April, Belmonte won the 2019 PBA DHC Japan Invitational held in Tokyo. Qualifying as the #3 seed for the stepladder finals, he defeated Chris Barnes, Takuya Miyazawa, and Jakob Butturff en route to his 22nd PBA Tour title, which tied him with Marshall Holman for 11th most career PBA Tour titles.

Belmonte surpassed $1.5 million (USD) in career PBA Tour earnings during the 2019 season, and led the Tour in titles (4), championship round appearances (12), average (225.62) and earnings (a career-high $288,290). By an overwhelming majority vote, Belmonte won his fifth Chris Schenkel PBA Player of the Year award in 2019.

On 3 January 2020, Bowlers Journal magazine named Belmonte the male Player of the Decade (2010–2019).

==== 2020: Completing the Super Slam ====
On 23 February 2020, Belmonte won his 23rd PBA Tour title and 12th major at the U.S. Open in Lincoln, Nebraska. As the #2 seed for the stepladder finals, he defeated Dick Allen in the semifinal match and Anthony Simonsen in the championship match. With his victory, Belmonte became the second bowler in PBA history (after Mike Aulby) to complete the Super Slam (winning all five PBA majors), as well as becoming the seventh Triple Crown and third Grand Slam winner.

On 15 March, Belmonte won his 24th PBA Tour title and 13th major at the 2020 PBA World Championship, part of the PBA World Series of Bowling held in Las Vegas, Nevada. As the #1 seed for the finals, he defeated Anthony Simonsen in the championship match 213–190 to claim the win and the $150,000 top prize. This was Belmonte's third PBA World Championship title, winning all three consecutively and becoming the second bowler to do so (the other being Earl Anthony).

On 4 October, Belmonte won the PBA World Series of Bowling XI Chameleon Championship held in Centreville, Virginia (qualifying rounds were held in Las Vegas in March). As the #1 seed, he defeated Brad Miller in the championship match 232–202 to claim his third career (second consecutive) Chameleon Championship title and 25th career PBA Tour title, tying Brian Voss for 10th on the all-time titles list.

On 18 December 2020, Belmonte won the Chris Schenkel PBA Player of the Year Award for the sixth time. In addition to his three titles (two majors) on the season, Belmonte led the Tour in competition points, average (225.31) and earnings (a career-high $293,050).

==== 2021 ====
Despite not winning a title through the first nine events of the 2021 season, Belmonte accumulated enough points to earn a spot in the starting field for the PBA Tour Playoffs, qualifying 14th. However, Belmonte chose to skip the event and instead return home to Australia for the birth of his fourth child. He had also chosen to skip the PBA Tour Finals on 26–27 June, having qualified for that event as well.

==== 2022: Five Titles in One Season ====
On 29 January, Belmonte captured his 26th PBA Tour title and 14th major at the 2022 PBA Players Championship, held in Euless, Texas. He qualified as the #4 seed for the West Region finals and climbed the stepladder to defeat Jakob Butturff in the region championship match and advance to the championship finals. He qualified as the #2 seed for the finals in a three-game seeding round, then defeated Arturo Quintero in the semifinal match and Sean Rash in the championship match to claim his third PBA Players Championship title.

On 16 February, after winning the Kokomo Championship and his 27th career PBA title, Belmonte surpassed Don Johnson on the all-time titles list, having previously tied with him in ninth place.

On 15 March, Belmonte won the PBA World Series of Bowling XIII Scorpion Championship. As the #4 seed, he climbed the stepladder to claim his 28th career title. On the difficult Scorpion oil pattern, Belmonte rolled games of 247, 211, 242, and 244, while none of his opponents reached 200.

On 20 March, Belmonte won the Lubbock Sports Open for his fourth title of the 2022 season. Qualifying as the #3 seed for the stepladder finals, he defeated Jesper Svensson, Sean Lavery-Spahr, and E. J. Tackett en route to his 29th career PBA Tour title, tying Mike Aulby for 8th most in PBA history. Winning two out of four events in the Storm Cup series, Belmonte won a $10,000 (USD) bonus and the Storm Cup for finishing first in series points.

On 5 June, during the 2022 PBA Tour Finals, Belmonte threw the 34th televised 300 game in PBA Tour history. With Kyle Troup rolling a 300 game earlier in the telecast, it marked the first time in the Tour's 60-plus year history where a televised event featured more than one perfect game. Also, Belmonte joined Sean Rash, François Lavoie, and Chris Via as the fourth player to throw multiple televised 300 games in PBA Tour events. He would go on to sweep Dom Barrett 2-0 in the championship for his 30th career PBA Tour title, tying Dick Weber for 7th on the all-time titles list.

Belmonte led the 2022 PBA Tour in titles (a career-high five) and earnings ($302,525), while winning the Harry Smith PBA Points Leader award (34,230). Jason made nine championship round appearances and posted a 20–4 record in championship round matches. On 4 November, the PBA announced that Belmonte had won his seventh Chris Schenkel PBA Player of the Year award, tying Walter Ray Williams Jr. for the most such awards in PBA history.

==== 2023: 15th major championship ====
On 19 March 2023, after failing to make the championship round in the first five tournaments, Belmonte climbed the stepladder as the #6 seed to win his 31st PBA title and fifteenth major at the PBA Tournament of Champions, defeating top seed E. J. Tackett 246–179 in the championship match. With this victory, he became the first person in PBA history to win this event four times.

In the 2023 PBA World Championship, Belmonte sat in the 12th and final match play position and over 300 pins out of the final TV spot before posting an incredible 11–1 match play record on 20 April to climb to the #4 seed. In the final round on 23 April, he defeated Santtu Tahvanainen, Jakob Butturff and Anthony Simonsen en route to the final match, but he then lost to E. J. Tackett, 254–247, to finish runner-up for the second time in this event.

On 21 May, Belmonte won the season "rubber match" against Tackett, albeit in a non-title event. In the PBA Super Slam Cup, a special made-for-television event featuring the 2023 major champions, Belmonte qualified as the top seed. Right after Tackett rolled a 300 game in the semifinal match, Belmonte posted the first ten strikes of the final game before leaving a 7-10 split on his eleventh shot. He defeated Tackett 286–246 to take home the Super Slam Cup, a custom WWE belt, and the first prize of $100,000.

In the PBA Tour Finals on 25 June 2023 Belmonte rolled the 35th televised 300 game in PBA Tour history, becoming the Tour's only player ever with three televised perfect games. The feat occurred in the second match of the race-to-two Group 2 finals against Kris Prather, knotting the match at one game each. Belmonte would lose the ninth-tenth frame roll-off against Prather, ending his quest for another title.

Despite only one title in 2023, Belmonte finished third in Tour earnings with $338,825.

==== 2024 ====
Despite not winning a title in this season, Belmonte finished fifth in Tour points and second in average (226.61). He had $145,799 in Tour earnings thanks to a runner-up finish at the Roth/Holman Doubles Championship and two third-place finishes at U.S. Open and USBC Masters. Belmonte's 9-match winning streak at the Masters was snapped after a 197-193 loss to Patrick Dombrowski in the semifinal match. He also made it to the quarterfinals of the PBA Playoffs (where he was eliminated by Bill O'Neill) and lost in the Group 2 stepladder of the PBA Tour Finals to eventual winner Anthony Simonsen.

==== 2025 ====
Belmonte won his 32nd career PBA Tour title at the Roth/Holman PBA Doubles Championship with Bill O'Neill on February 8, 2025 (broadcast March 2 on FS1). This was the duo's second Roth-Holman Doubles title together (they last won in 2018) and Belmonte's first title in nearly two years.

Belmonte qualified as the top seed for the PBA World Championship at PBA World Series of Bowling XVI. On the eve of the final round, he talked about his legacy and career aspirations as he bowls into his 40s:

I don't want to be the best in the world anymore. I want to be the best of all time. That's my motivation. That's my determination. That's why I leave my family. I'm very capable of winning 20 (majors), and then I can stay in Australia and call it a day. If I get to 20, I feel like that's the most ridiculous number that I could have ever imagined getting to. Whilst it seems a long way from now — I still have a PBA World Championship to win — that's my ultimate goal. That’s what I want to achieve in the next few years.

However, Belmonte would lose the title match in the PBA World Championship to E. J. Tackett, 242–222.

While Belmonte didn't win a singles title during the 2025 PBA regular season, his consistency led to a third-place finish on the Tour points list, earning him the #3 seed in the PBA Playoffs His bid for a Playoffs title was short-lived, however, as he was swept by Chris Via in two games in the quarterfinals.

On the season, Belmonte finished second in average (225.87), third in points (15,365), fourth in earnings ($190,835) and second in top-ten finishes (9).

==== 2026 ====
In 2026, Belmonte suffered his second winless season in the last three years. He parlayed ten top-24s into only two final round appearances, finishing fourth at the PBA Tournament of Champions and second at the WSOB XVII Chameleon Championship. For the season, he finished ninth in points, fourth in average (222.71), and tenth in earnings ($107,650). The earnings pushed him over the $3 million mark for his career.

His only tournament win occurred in the USA vs. The World team competition, a non-title event in which he captained the World team to a 5 points to 1 point win on April 4.

== Professional wins ==
=== PBA Tour wins (32) ===
Legend
Major championships (15)
Japan Invitational (1)
World Series of Bowling (5)
PBA Tour standard events (11)

No.	Date	Tournament	Championship Match	Runner(s)-up	Money ($)
1	29 Mar, 2009	The Bowling Foundation Long Island Classic	215–201	(United States) Mike Fagan	25,100
2	19 Nov, 2011	PBA Chameleon Open	268–191	(United States) Sean Rash	15,000
3	19 Nov, 2011	PBA Shark Open	243–213	(United States) Chris Barnes	15,000
4	20 Nov, 2011	PBA Players Championship	255–238	(United States) Mike DeVaney	35,000
5	27 Oct, 2012	Australian Masters	174–172; 223–255; 256–243	(United States) Sean Rash	25,860
6	18 Feb, 2013	USBC Masters	258–245	(United States) Wes Malott	50,000
7	2 Jun, 2013	Lucas Oil PBA Bear Open	235–211	(United States) Chris Barnes	8,000
8	26 Jan, 2014	PBA Tournament of Champions	219–218	(United States) Wes Malott	40,000
9	23 Feb, 2014	USBC Masters	221–177	(United States) E. J. Tackett	50,000
10	25 May, 2014	PBA Oklahoma Open	193–145	(United States) E. J. Tackett	18,000
11	8 Feb, 2015	USBC Masters	202–157	(United States) A. J. Johnson	50,000
12	15 Feb, 2015	PBA Tournament of Champions	232–214	(United States) Rhino Page	50,100
13	12 Feb, 2017	PBA Players Championship	221–204	(United States) Anthony Simonsen	40,000
14	26 Feb, 2017	USBC Masters	279–212	(United States) Michael Tang	30,000
15	27 Aug, 2017	Storm Lucky Larsen Masters	245–180	(United States) Cameron Weier	19,832
16	19 Nov, 2017	PBA World Championship	238–225	(Sweden) Jesper Svensson	60,000
17	25 Feb, 2018	Roth/Holman PBA Doubles Championship (with Bill O'Neill)	205–185	(United States) Michael Tang & (United States) Darren Tang	24,000 (12,000 each)
18	6 May, 2018	PBA Tour Finals	239–205; 170–219 (RO: 40–26)	(United States) E. J. Tackett	30,000
19	10 Feb, 2019	PBA Tournament of Champions	225–196	(United States) E. J. Tackett	50,000
20	19 Mar, 2019	PBA Chameleon Championship	236–194	(Colombia) Andres Gomez	20,000
21	21 Mar, 2019	PBA World Championship	236–227	(United States) Jakob Butturff	60,000
22	28 Apr, 2019	DHC PBA Japan Invitational	224–213	(United States) Jakob Butturff	44,650
23	23 Feb, 2020	U.S. Open	226–201	(United States) Anthony Simonsen	30,000
24	15 Mar, 2020	PBA World Championship	213–190	(United States) Anthony Simonsen	150,000
25	4 Oct, 2020	PBA Chameleon Championship	232–202	(United States) Brad Miller	25,000
26	29 Jan, 2022	PBA Players Championship	210–202	(United States) Sean Rash	100,000
27	16 Feb, 2022	Storm Cup: PBA David Small's Kokomo Championship	249–243	(United States) Nicholas Pate	20,000
28	15 Mar, 2022	PBA Scorpion Championship	244–176	(United States) Anthony Simonsen	20,000
29	20 Mar, 2022	Storm Cup: Lubbock Sports Open	253–245	(United States) E. J. Tackett	20,000
30	5 Jun, 2022	PBA Tour Finals	300–238; 235–202	(United Kingdom) Dom Barrett	30,000 +
31	19 Mar, 2023	PBA Tournament of Champions	246–179	(United States) E. J. Tackett	100,000
32	8 Feb, 2025	Roth/Holman PBA Doubles Championship (with Bill O'Neill)	210–169	(United States) Shawn Maldonado & (United States) D. J. Archer	50,000 (25,000 each)

RO = After splitting the two-game final, Belmonte won in a 9th/10th frame roll-off.

+ = Belmonte won a $10,000 perfect game bonus.

== Major championships ==
Legend
PBA Players Championship (3)
USBC Masters (4)
PBA Tournament of Champions (4)
US Open (1)
PBA World Championship (3)

=== Wins (15) ===
Year	Championship	Final Score	Runners-up
2011–2012	PBA Players Championship	255–238	(United States) Mike DeVaney
2012–2013	USBC Masters	258–245	(United States) Wes Malott
2014	PBA Tournament of Champions	219–218	(United States) Wes Malott
2014	USBC Masters	221–177	(United States) E. J. Tackett
2015	USBC Masters	202–157	(United States) A.J. Johnson
2015	PBA Tournament of Champions	232–214	(United States) Rhino Page
2017	PBA Players Championship	221–204	(United States) Anthony Simonsen
2017	USBC Masters	279–212	(United States) Michael Tang
2017	PBA World Championship	238–225	(Sweden) Jesper Svensson
2019	PBA Tournament of Champions	225–196	(United States) E. J. Tackett
2019	PBA World Championship	236–227	(United States) Jakob Butturff
2020	U.S. Open	226–201	(United States) Anthony Simonsen
2020	PBA World Championship	213–190	(United States) Anthony Simonsen
2022	PBA Players Championship	210–202	(United States) Sean Rash
2023	PBA Tournament of Champions	246–179	(United States) E. J. Tackett

=== Results timeline ===
Results not in chronological order.

Tournament	08-09	09-10	10–11	11–12	12–13	2014	2015	2016	2017	2018	2019	2020	2021	2022	2023	2024	2025	2026
PBA Players Championship	Not Held			1	5	NH	4	40	1	2	2	3	W19	1	13	24	6	37
USBC Masters	26	8	35	9	1	1	1	T7	1	T25	169	NH	T13	T7	T13	3	T49	T9
Tournament of Champions		45	12	3	2	1	1	4	7	4	1	4	3	10	1	11	23	4
U.S. Open	115	6	10	3	2	NH	32	12	17	46	4	1	12	3	70	3	10	8
World Championship	10	30	7	4	2 / 8^{1}	13	40	4	1	NH	1	1	35	4	2	11	2	6

^{1} – there were two PBA World Championships held in the 2012–2013 season.

Win
Top 10

"T" = Tied for a place
"W" = West Region Finals

=== Summary ===
Tournament	Wins	2nd	3rd	Top-5	Top-10	Events
PBA Players Championship	3	2	1	8	9	14
USBC Masters	4	0	1	5	10	17
PBA Tournament of Champions	4	1	2	11	13	17
U.S. Open	1	1	3	6	10	17
PBA World Championship	3	3	0	9	12	17
Totals	15	7	7	39	54	82

== World Series of Bowling ==
=== Wins (5) ===
Year	Championship	Final score	Runner-up	Earnings ($)
2011	Chameleon Open	268–191	(United States) Sean Rash	15,000
2011	Shark Open	243–213	(United States) Chris Barnes	15,000
2019	Chameleon Championship	236–194	(Colombia) Andres Gomez	20,000
2020	Chameleon Championship	232–202	(United States) Brad Miller	25,000
2022	Scorpion Championship	244–176	(United States) Anthony Simonsen	20,000

=== Results timeline ===
Results not in chronological order.

Tournament	2008	2009	2010	2011	2012	2013	2014	2015	2016	2017	2018	2019	2020	2021	2022
Cheetah Championship	60	61	87	37	23	35	13	63	44	4	NH	37	70	40	53
Viper Championship		8	115	75	25	4	5	112	Not Held						
Chameleon Championship		12	6	1	2	12	21	47	66	13	NH	1	1	69	NH
Scorpion Championship	29	2	3	20	3	29	14	76	11	2	NH	16	5	8	1
Shark Championship		7	3	1	Not Held				67	26	Not Held				3
Doubles Championship	Not Held			NI	Not Held			Not Included						6	8

Tournament	2023	2024	2025	2026
Cheetah Championship	10	11	NH	38
Viper Championship	Not Held		5	NH
Chameleon Championship	Not Held		19	2
Scorpion Championship	35	5	11	62
Shark Championship	14	76	7	17
Doubles Championship	NI	2	Not Included	

Win
Top 10
Did not play

"T" = Tied for a place

== PBA Tour career summary ==
Season	Events	Cashes	Match Play	Champ. Rounds	PBA Titles (majors)	Average	Average Rank	Earnings ($ US)	Earnings Rank
2008–09	9	8	6	1	1	219.20	10	44,380	30
2009–10	16	15	10	3	0	217.94	13	80,090	11
2010–11	12	10	9	4	0	218.82	8	62,950	22
2011–12	13	12	9	8	4 (1)	226.42	3	137,375	2
2012–13	26	21	13	10	2 (1)	228.81	1	186,465	3
2014	18	17	6	4	3 (2)	226.71	1	163,778	1
2015	20	15	11	11	2 (2)	225.40	1	178,542	1
2016	24	15	11	6	0	224.75	2	95,345	6
2017	15	15	11	7	4 (3)	229.49	1	238,912	1
2018	14	10	9	7	2	221.38	1	110,500	3
2019	19	17	15	12	4 (2)	225.62	1	288,290	1
2020	13	12	10	7	3 (2)	225.31	1	293,050	1
2021	9	5	5	1	0	215.26	31	62,200	19
2022	15	13	13	8	5 (1)	224.38	2	302,525	1
2023	20	17	11	4	1 (1)	220.63	5	338,825	3
2024	15	14	13	5	0	226.61	2	145,799	8
2025	16	14	9	4	1	225.87	2	190,835	4
2026	15	11	10	2	0	222.71	4	107,650	10
Totals	289	245	181	113	32 (15)			3,027,511	

Win
Top 10

* As of 1 October 2026

== Personal life ==
Belmonte is married to Kimberly Shapter, who is a registered nurse, and together they have two daughters and two sons. The family resides in Orange, New South Wales.

== In the media ==
Belmonte is one of five featured PBA players in the Ben Stiller-produced documentary Born to Bowl, which premiered on HBO and HBO Max March 16, 2026.

Awards and achievements
Preceded by (United States) Walter Ray Williams, Jr.	Best Bowler ESPY Award; 2011	Succeeded by (United States) Sean Rash
Preceded by (United States) Sean Rash	PBA Player of the Year; 2013–15	Succeeded by (United States) E. J. Tackett
