= Chris Loschetter =

Personal information
- Born: May 24, 1980 (age 46)

Bowling Information
- Affiliation: PBA
- Rookie year: 2003
- Dominant hand: Right (tweener delivery)
- Wins: 2 PBA Tour; 16 PBA Regional Tour; 2 EBT
- Sponsors: MOTIV, VISE Grips

Chris Loschetter (born May 24, 1980) is an American professional bowler from Florida, who has bowled on the Professional Bowlers Association (PBA) Tour and internationally. Loschetter attended Florida State University, and was on the bowling team there in the 2002–03 and 2003–04 seasons. He was part of the Junior Team USA from 2000–2001. He became a member of the PBA in 2003 and bowled on the PBA Tour.

He spent several years on the pro staff for Brunswick before becoming a "free agent" in 2013. From 2015 through 2022, he was on the pro staff for MOTIV bowling balls and VISE Grips.

== Career ==
Loschetter joined the PBA Tour in 2003. He holds two PBA Tour titles and 16 PBA Regional titles. He has 25 career perfect games in PBA competition, and his highest certified series is an 847. His career PBA earnings have eclipsed $700,000.

His best season to date was 2007–08, during which he cashed in 20 events, made match play 14 times, made two TV finals appearances, finished 8th in PBA Tour points, and collected $84,776 in earnings.

=== Second place ===
From 2003 to 2012, Loschetter made it to the title match on four occasions, losing all four times as opponents averaged 260.5 against him. He was denied his first major title when he was defeated by Patrick Allen in the final match of the 2004–05 PBA World Championship, 235–210. One of the closest times he came to winning was in 2008 at the Pepsi Championship, when he was the #1 seed going into the title match but got beat by fellow Brunswick pro staff member Brad Angelo, 256–215. Loschetter was also chosen to represent Brunswick at the 2012 PBA Summer Shootout alongside Sean Rash. Although it wouldn’t count as a PBA Tour Title, Loschetter and Rash made the championship match, to face Jason Belmonte and Pete Weber. However, needing a mark and good count to win, Loschetter left the 3-4-6-7 split in the 10th frame, and after leaving the 4 pin on his spare attempt, Team Brunswick lost 244–233.

=== First PBA Tour title ===
On June 1, 2013, Loschetter ended a title drought of nine years and 153 events on the Tour by winning the Lucas Oil PBA Wolf Open in Wauwatosa, WI. As the first-ranked qualifier for the event, he only had to bowl one game in the televised final, in which he defeated four-time PBA title winner Bill O'Neill by a score of 264–231. At the time, Loschetter had the third-longest active streak of PBA events without a win, behind Joe Ciccone and Nathan Bohr.

=== Additional accomplishments ===
Loschetter won the 2011 Kuwait Open, which at the time did not count as a PBA title. He also owns two European Bowling Tour (EBT) titles. Loschetter was a member of the 'Merica Rooster Illusion team, which won the PBA Team Challenge title in Las Vegas on November 1, 2016. This counted as his second PBA Tour title.

Loschetter was voted by his PBA Tour peers to receive the Steve Nagy Sportsmanship Award for the 2017 season.

== Personal life ==
Loschetter currently resides in Avon, Ohio with his wife Erin, who bowled collegiately at Central Missouri State. The two have a son named Emmett. Loschetter is a survivor of testicular cancer. Since 2022, Loschetter has held the position of District Sales Manager for QubicaAMF.
