= Mike Fagan =

American professional bowler

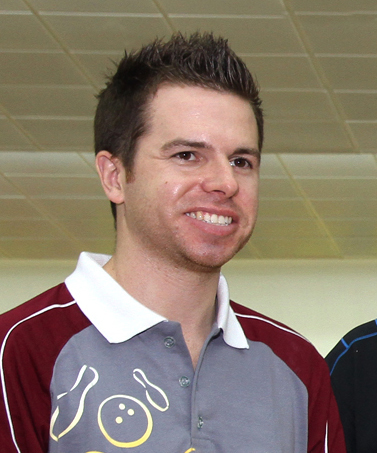
- Fagan in 2011

Personal information
- Full name: Michael Todd Fagan
- Nicknames: King of Swing, Argyle Assassin
- Born: November 4, 1980 (age 45) Westbury, New York, U.S.
- Years active: 2002–2016
- Spouse: Emily Maier

Sport
- Country: United States
- Sport: Ten-pin bowling
- League: PBA
- Turned pro: 2002

Achievements and titles
- World finals: 5 European Bowling Tour
- National finals: 5 PBA Tour (2 majors)
Medal record
Men's bowling
Representing United States
World Games
Gold medal – first place	2013 Cali	Mixed doubles

Michael Todd Fagan (born November 4, 1980) is an American former professional bowler on the PBA Tour. He has also participated in World Bowling Tour (WBT) and European Bowling Tour (EBT) events, and as a member of Team USA in international competitions. Known for his high backswing, he was given the nickname "King of Swing". He has a high RPM rate, but also has a smooth release, so his style can be classified as either a cranker or a power stroker.

== PBA career ==
Fagan began his PBA career in the 2002–03 season, and owns five PBA Tour titles, including two majors. He captured his first PBA title in his 108th career event, winning the PBA Exempt Doubles Classic with partner Danny Wiseman in the 2007–08 season. He earned his first singles title at the 2010 One-a-Day Dick Weber Open, defeating all-time titles leader Walter Ray Williams, Jr. in the final match.

Having lost to Chris Barnes in his first TV appearance at the semifinals of the 2003 Empire State Open in Latham, New York, Fagan won against Barnes in the 2012 USBC Masters, overcoming a 30-pin deficit after five frames to win his third title and first major championship. Fagan narrowly missed winning a second consecutive major in that season's U.S. Open, when Pete Weber rolled a strike on his final ball of the tenth frame to defeat Fagan by a single pin, 215–214. His next victory came at the 2012 Brunswick Euro Challenge, a World Bowling Tour event, where he was credited with his fourth PBA Title. Marking his first (and so far only) season with multiple titles, Fagan won a career-high $116,950 in 2011–12.

Fagan won his fifth career title and second major at the PBA World Championship on January 11, 2015, defeating Wes Malott in the final match, 252–212.

=== PBA Tour titles ===
Major championships are in bold text.

1. 2008 PBA Exempt Doubles Classic w/Danny Wiseman (Las Vegas, Nevada)
2. 2010 One-A-Day Dick Weber Open (Fountain Valley, California)
3. **2012 Alka-Seltzer Plus Liquid Gels USBC Masters** (Henderson, Nevada)
4. 2012 Brunswick Euro Challenge (Sainte-Maxime, France)
5. **2015 PBA World Championship** (Las Vegas, Nevada)

== Other career highlights ==
- Prior to 2012, Fagan's best finish at a major was third place at the 2006 U.S. Open. He defeated 2000 U.S. Open champion Robert Smith, 216–214, in the first match of the finals (his first career televised victory) before losing to eventual champion Tommy Jones.
- Had a career-high four perfect 300 games during the 2007–08 season, tied for second on Tour. Through the 2016 season, he had accumulated 21 perfect games in PBA events.
- His career PBA Tour earnings are over $892,000 (through 2016). He also owns two PBA Regional titles.
- Was the victim of Liz Johnson in the finals of the 2005 East Region Kingpin Lanes tournament, the first PBA tournament ever won by a female bowler.
- Lost with an 8-pin count to Jack Jurek's strike in a sudden death rolloff after tying the game at 218 in the 2009 Shark Championship, giving Jurek his first title in 14 years.
- Has won five European Bowling Tour (EBT) titles as of April 30, 2012.
- He is a five-time member of Team USA (2010–11, 2013–15)
- Fagan has also served as PBA Player Committee Chairman and was on the USBC Board of Directors.

== Personal life ==
Originally from Patchogue, New York, Fagan now resides in Las Vegas with his wife, Emily (Maier), who bowled collegiately for Wichita State University and also for Team USA in 2010. The two were married in 2013. Mike, who got his undergraduate degree in Finance at St. John's University, announced during the 2015 season that he would be reducing his appearances on the PBA Tour to pursue his MBA at the University of California, Berkeley. He only entered three PBA Tour events in the 2016 season and did not make an appearance in the 2017 season. By 2020, he had become Director of Business Development for a company that owns bowling centers in Minnesota.
