= List of WTBA World Tenpin Bowling Championships medalists =

This is a list of the WTBA World Tenpin Bowling Championships medal winners.

== Total medal table ==
As 2019

Rank	Nation	Gold	Silver	Bronze	Total
1	United States (USA)	61	52	51	164
2	Sweden (SWE)	26	26	21	73
3	South Korea (KOR)	24	16	31	71
4	Finland (FIN)	15	23	22	60
5	Australia (AUS)	9	7	14	30
6	Chinese Taipei (TPE)	9	7	6	22
7	Malaysia (MAS)	8	10	5	23
8	Canada (CAN)	8	7	6	21
9	Philippines (PHI)	8	6	3	17
10	England (ENG)	8	3	9	20
11	Mexico (MEX)	7	11	13	31
12	Germany (GER)	6	12	15	33
13	Japan (JPN)	5	10	9	24
14	Colombia (COL)	5	5	10	20
15	Singapore (SIN)	4	10	8	22
16	Denmark (DEN)	4	3	12	19
17	Netherlands (NED)	4	2	5	11
18	Belgium (BEL)	2	3	1	6
19	Puerto Rico (PUR)	2	1	3	6
20	Venezuela (VEN)	1	3	10	14
21	Norway (NOR)	1	3	4	8
22	France (FRA)	1	1	5	7
23	Hong Kong (HKG)	1	1	2	4
24	China (CHN)	1	1	0	2
25	Italy (ITA)	1	0	1	2
25	Qatar (QAT)	1	0	1	2
25	Thailand (THA)	1	0	1	2
28	United Arab Emirates (UAE)	0	1	3	4
29	Indonesia (INA)	0	1	2	3
30	Austria (AUT)	0	0	1	1
30	Guam (GUM)	0	0	1	1
30	Ireland (IRL)	0	0	1	1
30	Kuwait (KUW)	0	0	1	1
30	Latvia (LAT)	0	0	1	1
30	South Africa (SAF)	0	0	1	1
Totals (35 entries)		223	225	279	727

- http://etbf.eu/his-wor-wch-medaltallies/

== Current events ==
=== Men ===
==== Singles ====
Games	Gold	Silver	Bronze
1979 Manila	(Philippines) Ollie Ongtawco	(Venezuela) Rogelio Felice	(Japan) Michio Matsubara
1983 Caracas	(Colombia) Armando Marino	(Puerto Rico) Eddie Garofalo	(Japan) Taksahi Shino
1987 Helsinki	(France) Patrick Rolland	(Philippines) Rafael "Paeng" Nepomuceno	(United States) Rick Steelsmith
1991 Singapore	(Chinese Taipei) Ma Yingchieh	(Mexico) Roberto Silva	(South Korea) Bom Sok-Suh
1995 Reno	(Canada) Marc Doi	(Canada) Bill Rowe	(Chinese Taipei) Yang Chenmin
1999 Abu Dhabi	(Belgium) Gery Verbruggen	(Germany) Achim Grabowski	(Netherlands) Nico Thienpondt
2003 Kuala Lumpur	(Finland) Mika Luoto	(United States) Tim Mack	(Guam) Duane Camacho
2006 Busan	(Singapore) Remy Ong	(United States) Rhino Page	(South Korea) Jo Nam-Yi
2008 Bangkok	(United States) Walter Ray Williams Jr.	(Germany) Kai Gunther	(Kuwait) Basil al-Anzi
2008 Bangkok	(United States) Walter Ray Williams Jr.	(Germany) Kai Gunther	(France) Francois Sacco
2010 Munich	(United States) Bill O'Neill	(South Korea) Choi Bok-Eum	(England) Dominic Barrett
2010 Munich	(United States) Bill O'Neill	(South Korea) Choi Bok-Eum	(United States) Chris Barnes
2013 Henderson	(United States) Bill O'Neill	(Germany) Bodo Konieczny	(Sweden) Martin Larsen
2013 Henderson	(United States) Bill O'Neill	(Germany) Bodo Konieczny	(South Korea) Shin Seung-Hyeon
2014 Abu Dhabi	(Canada) Dan MacLelland	(United Arab Emirates) Shaker al-Hassan	(United States) Tommy Jones
2014 Abu Dhabi	(Canada) Dan MacLelland	(United Arab Emirates) Shaker al-Hassan	(Australia) Sam Cooley
2017 Las Vegas	(Netherlands) Xander van Mazijk	(Chinese Taipei) Wu Hao-ming	(Germany) Tobias Boerding
2017 Las Vegas	(Netherlands) Xander van Mazijk	(Chinese Taipei) Wu Hao-ming	(Puerto Rico) Israel Hernández
2018 Hong Kong	(Malaysia) Muhammad Rafiq Ismail	(Canada) Dan MacLelland	(United States) Andrew Anderson
2018 Hong Kong	(Malaysia) Muhammad Rafiq Ismail	(Canada) Dan MacLelland	(United States) Kyle Troup

==== Doubles ====
Games	Gold	Silver	Bronze
1954 Helsinki	Finland; Osmo Koivunen; Odin Koskinen	Sweden; Gösta Algeskog; Erland Ottosson	Finland; Kauko Ahlström; Onni Kytö
1955 Essen	Sweden; Pelle Phil; Fritiof Söderberg	Finland; Yrjö Ilvespalo; Artturi Paladanlius	West Germany; Willi Laun; Peter Winkler
1958 Helsingborg	Sweden; Evert Lindbergh; Carl-Gustaf Carjö	Venezuela; Jose Medina; Miguel Correa	Venezuela; Louis Garcia; Miguel Raimondi
1960 Hamburg	Mexico; Tito Reinolds; Miguel Anaya	Finland; Kalle Asukas; Rauno Manni	Sweden; Sune Westlund; Gunnar Hall
1963 Mexico City	United States; Jim Schroeder; Bus Oswalt	Finland; Tauno Nieminen; Pentti Virtanen	Mexico; Jesus Lopez; Avelino Martinez
1967 Malmö	England; David Pond; Jeff Morley	Mexico; Miguel Estrada; Manuel Azcona	United States; Bob Pinkalla; Wayne Pinkalla
1971 Milwaukee	Puerto Rico; Romaldo Sebelen; Carlos Diaz	United States; Bob Glaser; John Handegard	Australia; Victor Bubniw; Graham Smith
1975 London	England; Brian Micheal; Bernie Caterer	Singapore; Denis Tay; Henry Tan	United States; Bud Stoudt; Bobby Meadows
1979 Manila	Australia; Eric Thompson; Ron Powell	South Korea; Byon Chul; Ahn Byung Ku	United States; Jim Lindquist; Rich Supanich
1983 Caracas	England; Chris Buck; Alan Fawcett	None awarded	West Germany; Bernd Bauhofer; Norbert Griesert
1983 Caracas	Australia; Ken Harding; John Sullivan	None awarded	West Germany; Bernd Bauhofer; Norbert Griesert
1987 Helsinki	Sweden; Ulf Hämnäs; Ulf Bolleby	Singapore; Patric Wee; Sam Goh	United States; Dan Nadeau; Rick Steelsmith
1991 Singapore	United States; Pat Healey; Steve Kloempken	Japan; Kengo Tagata; HiroshiYamamoto	Philippines; Rafael "Paeng" Nepomuceno; Paulo Valdez
1995 Reno	Sweden; Tomas Leandersson; Raymond Jansson	Australia; Warren Stuwart; Andrew Frawley	Venezuela; Augustin de Faria; Pedro Carreyo
1999 Abu Dhabi	Sweden; Patrik Backe; Martin Blixt	Colombia; Andrés Gómez; Jaime Monroy; Finland; Kimmo Lehtonen; Petri Mannonen	None awarded
2003 Kuala Lumpur	Sweden; Tomas Leandersson; Anders Öhman	Germany; Achim Grabowski; Jens Nickel	Sweden; Robert Andersson; Martin Larsen
2006 Busan	Sweden; Martin Larsen; Robert Andersson	England; Daniel Stride; Mike Quarry	Australia; Jason Belmonte; Jarrod Lean
2008 Bangkok	United States; Patrick Allen; Rhino Page	Sweden; Tomas Leandersson; Martin Larsen	Finland; Petteri Salonen; Pasi Uotila
2008 Bangkok	United States; Patrick Allen; Rhino Page	Sweden; Tomas Leandersson; Martin Larsen	Norway; Tore Torgersen; Mads Sandbäkken
2010 Munich	Sweden; Martin Paulsson; Mathias Aarup	Malaysia; Alex Liew; Muhamad Aiman	Germany; Bodo Konieczny; Jens Nickel
2010 Munich	Sweden; Martin Paulsson; Mathias Aarup	Malaysia; Alex Liew; Muhamad Aiman	United States; Patrick Allen; Rhino Page
2013 Henderson	United States; John Szczerbinski; Chris Barnes	Finland; Pasi Uotila; Osku Palermaa	Finland; Joonas Jehkinen; Petteri Salonen
2013 Henderson	United States; John Szczerbinski; Chris Barnes	Finland; Pasi Uotila; Osku Palermaa	United States; John Janawicz; Mike Fagan
2014 Abu Dhabi	South Korea; Jong-Woo Park; Bok-Eum Choi	Japan; Daisuke Yoshida; Shusaku Asato	Finland; Kimmo Lehtonen; Joonas Jehkinen
2014 Abu Dhabi	South Korea; Jong-Woo Park; Bok-Eum Choi	Japan; Daisuke Yoshida; Shusaku Asato	South Korea; Seung-Hyeon Shin; Hee-Won Kang
2017 Las Vegas	United States; Chris Barnes; Tommy Jones	Hong Kong; Kwun Ho Lau; Eric Tseng	Japan; Takuya Miyazawa; Shota Kouki
2017 Las Vegas	United States; Chris Barnes; Tommy Jones	Hong Kong; Kwun Ho Lau; Eric Tseng	Finland; Niko Oksanen; Petteri Salonen
2018 Hong Kong	Malaysia; Adrian Ang; Tun Ameerul Al-Hakim	United States; E. J. Tackett; Andrew Anderson	South Korea; Park Jong-woo; Kim Kyung-min
2018 Hong Kong	Malaysia; Adrian Ang; Tun Ameerul Al-Hakim	United States; E. J. Tackett; Andrew Anderson	Canada; Dan MacLelland; Francois Lavoie

==== Trios ====
Games	Gold	Silver	Bronze
1979 Manila	Malaysia; Allan Hooi; Ed Lim; J. B. Koo	USA; Terry Kullibert; Jack Wilson; Richard Supanich	France; Jean Moulenac; Jacques Marengo; Albert Arana
1983 Caracas	Sweden; Kenneth Andersson; Tony Rosenquist; Mats Karlsson	Philippines; Paeng Nepomuceno; Rauel Reformado; Oliver Ongtawco	USA; Tony Cariello; Darold Meisel; Richard Wonders
1987 Helsinki	USA; Dan Nadeau; Duane Sandvick; Rick Steelsmith	Finland; Teemu Raatikainen; Tom Hahl; Mikko Kaartinen	Netherlands; Bart Jan Boogaart; Cyriel Winters; Tom Plummen
1991 Singapore	USA; Pat Healey; Vince Biondo; Steve Kloempken	Chinese Taipei; Ying-Chieh Ma; Chen-Yi Tang; Cheng Yang	Finland; Mika Koivuniemi; Kai Virtanen; Tapani Peltola
1995 Reno	Netherlands; Erwin Groen; Niko Thienpondt; Michael Sassen	Netherlands; Geert van Baest; Maarten Krull; Marcel vd Bosch	Sweden; Tomas Leandersson; Patrik Johansson; Raymond Jansson
1999 Abu Dhabi	Finland; Antti Pekka Lax; Lasse Lintelä; Ari Halme	Norway; Kim Asbjörn Haugen; Petter Hansen; Tore Torgersen	Qatar; Ahmed Shaheen; Bandar Al-Shafi; Saeed Al-Hajri
2003 Kuala Lumpur	USA; Dino Castillo; Bill Hoffman; Tim Mack	Finland; Petri Mannonen; Sami Konsteri; Lasse Lintilä	Mexico; Daniel Falconi; Benjamin Corona; Alejandro Cruz
2006 Busan	South Korea; Tae-Won Kim; Jong-In Choi; Seoung-Joo Joung	South Korea; Bok-Eum Choi; Hee-Won Kang; Nam-Yi Jo	Malaysia; Aaron Kong; Ben Heng; Zulmazran Zulkifli
2008 Bangkok	South Korea; Bok-Eum Choi; Ki-Bong Choi; Tae-Young Kim	Japan; Toshihiko Takahashi; Shota Kawazoe; Tomokatsu Yamashita	USA; Bill Hoffman; Patrick Allen; Rhino Page
2008 Bangkok	South Korea; Bok-Eum Choi; Ki-Bong Choi; Tae-Young Kim	Japan; Toshihiko Takahashi; Shota Kawazoe; Tomokatsu Yamashita	USA; Walter Ray Williams, Jr. Chris Barnes; Tommy Jones
2010 Munich	USA; Patrick Allen; Rhino Page; Wes Malott	Mexico; Ernesto Franco; Jorge Rosado; Alejandro Cruz	Chinese Taipei; Hsing-Chao Cheng; Kun-Yi Hung; Hao-Ming Wu
2010 Munich	USA; Patrick Allen; Rhino Page; Wes Malott	Mexico; Ernesto Franco; Jorge Rosado; Alejandro Cruz	USA; Bill O'Neill; Chris Barnes; Tommy Jones
2013 Henderson	Canada; Mark Buffa; Francois Lavoie; Patrick Girard	South Korea; Bok-Eum Choi; Young-Seon Cho; Jun-Yung Kim	Colombia; Edwar Rey; Óscar Rodríguez; Santiago Mejía
2013 Henderson	Canada; Mark Buffa; Francois Lavoie; Patrick Girard	South Korea; Bok-Eum Choi; Young-Seon Cho; Jun-Yung Kim	USA; Chris Barnes; Bill O'Neill; Tommy Jones
2014 Abu Dhabi	Denmark; Frederik Øhrgaard; Carsten W. Hansen; Thomas Larsen	USA; Mike Fagan; Sean Rash; Marshall Kent	South Korea; Jong-Woo Park; Hae-Sol Hong; Kyung-Min Kim
2014 Abu Dhabi	Denmark; Frederik Øhrgaard; Carsten W. Hansen; Thomas Larsen	USA; Mike Fagan; Sean Rash; Marshall Kent	Australia; David Porto; Sam Cooley; Jason Belmonte
2017 Las Vegas	Hong Kong; Eric Tseng; Wu Siu Hong; Michael Mak	Chinese Taipei; Chen Wu-chi; Xu Zhe-jia; Wu Hao-ming	Finland; Joonas Jähi; Petteri Salonen; Niko Oksanen
2017 Las Vegas	Hong Kong; Eric Tseng; Wu Siu Hong; Michael Mak	Chinese Taipei; Chen Wu-chi; Xu Zhe-jia; Wu Hao-ming	Japan; Daisuke Yoshida; Shogo Wada; Shusaku Asato
2018 Hong Kong	United States; Kyle Troup; E. J. Tackett; Andrew Anderson	Indonesia; Billy Muhammad Islam; Hardy Rachmadian; Ryan Leonard Lalisang	South Korea; Kim Kyung-min; Koo Seong-hoi; Park Jong-woo
2018 Hong Kong	United States; Kyle Troup; E. J. Tackett; Andrew Anderson	Indonesia; Billy Muhammad Islam; Hardy Rachmadian; Ryan Leonard Lalisang	Sweden; Mattias Wetterberg; Jesper Svensson; Martin Larsen

==== 5er teams ====
Games	Gold	Silver	Bronze
1954 Helsinki	Sweden	Sweden	Finland
1955 Essen	West Germany	Finland	Sweden
1958 Helsingborg	Finland	Sweden	Mexico
1960 Hamburg	Venezuela	Sweden	Mexico
1963 Mexico City	USA	Mexico	Venezuela
1967 Malmö	Finland	Japan	England
1971 Milwaukee	USA	Belgium	Italy
1975 London	Finland	USA	Norway
1979 Manila	Australia	England	Netherlands
1983 Caracas	Finland	USA	Sweden
1987 Helsinki	Sweden	Finland	Netherlands
1991 Singapore	Chinese Taipei	Philippines	Netherlands
1995 Reno	Netherlands	Sweden	France
1999 Abu Dhabi	Sweden	USA	Germany
2003 Kuala Lumpur	Sweden	USA	UAE
2006 Busan	USA	Malaysia	Finland
2008 Bangkok	USA	South Korea	Finland
2008 Bangkok	USA	South Korea	Norway
2010 Munich	USA	Finland	Colombia
2010 Munich	USA	Finland	Germany
2013 Henderson	Finland	USA	South Korea
2013 Henderson	Finland	USA	Denmark
2014 Abu Dhabi	South Korea; Park Jong-Woo; Choi Bok-Eum; Kang Hee-Won; Hong Hae-Sol; Shin Seung-Hyeon; Kim Kyung-Min	USA; Mike Fagan; Chris Barnes; Marshal Kent; Bill O'Neill; Sean Rash; Tommy Jones	Sweden; Robert Andersson; Martin Paulssomn; Joachim Karlsson; Jesper Svensson; Martin Larsen
2014 Abu Dhabi	South Korea; Park Jong-Woo; Choi Bok-Eum; Kang Hee-Won; Hong Hae-Sol; Shin Seung-Hyeon; Kim Kyung-Min	USA; Mike Fagan; Chris Barnes; Marshal Kent; Bill O'Neill; Sean Rash; Tommy Jones	Australia; David Porto; Layden Leming; Paul White; Brendan Meads; Sam Cooley; Jason Belmonte
2017 Las Vegas	United States; Chris Barnes; A. J. Johnson; Tommy Jones; Marshall Kent; Chris Via; Jakob Butturff	Chinese Taipei; Chen Chien-ju; Chen Wu-chi; Hsieh Chin-liang; Wu Hao-ming; Xu Zhe-jia; Fang Chih-nan	Denmark; Carsten Warming Hansen; Thomas Larsen; Jimmy Dan Mortensen; Dan Ostergaard-Poulsen; Jesper Agerbo; Mik Stampe
2017 Las Vegas	United States; Chris Barnes; A. J. Johnson; Tommy Jones; Marshall Kent; Chris Via; Jakob Butturff	Chinese Taipei; Chen Chien-ju; Chen Wu-chi; Hsieh Chin-liang; Wu Hao-ming; Xu Zhe-jia; Fang Chih-nan	Colombia; Andrés Gómez; Jaime González; Santiago Mejía; Manuel Otalora; Óscar Rodríguez; Sebastian Charry
2018 Hong Kong	Italy; Marco Reviglio; Pierpaolo De Filippi; Nicola Pongolini; Erik Davolio; Antonino Fiorentino; Marco Parapini	United States; E. J. Tackett; Kyle Troup; Jakob Butturff; Chris Barnes; Andrew Anderson; Tommy Jones	Canada; David Simard; Zach Wilkins; Mitch Hupe; Dan MacLelland; Francois Lavoie; Graham Fach
2018 Hong Kong	Italy; Marco Reviglio; Pierpaolo De Filippi; Nicola Pongolini; Erik Davolio; Antonino Fiorentino; Marco Parapini	United States; E. J. Tackett; Kyle Troup; Jakob Butturff; Chris Barnes; Andrew Anderson; Tommy Jones	Singapore; Basil Ng; Jonovan Neo; Joel Tan; Darren Ong; Jaris Goh; Keith Saw

==== All-events ====
Games	Gold	Silver	Bronze
1979 Manila	(England) Eric Thompson	(South Korea) Lee Song-jin	(France) Philippe Dubois
1983 Caracas	(Sweden) Mats Karlsson	(Netherlands) Erik Kok	(United States) Rick Wonders
1987 Helsinki	(United States) Rick Steelsmith	(Sweden) Ulf Bolleby	(Finland) Tom Hahl
1991 Singapore	(Chinese Taipei) Ma Yingchieh	(Finland) Mika Koivuniemi	(South Korea) Bom Sok-suh
1995 Reno	(Netherlands) Michael Sassen	(Norway) Tore Torgersen	(United Arab Emirates) Mohammed Kalifa
1999 Abu Dhabi	(Norway) Tore Torgersen	(Mexico) Roberto Silva	(Sweden) Tomas Leandersson
2003 Kuala Lumpur	(Sweden) Anders Ohman	(United States) Tim Mack	(Germany) Jens Nickel
2006 Busan	(Singapore) Remy Ong	(United States) Rhino Page	(South Korea) Jo Nam-yi
2008 Bangkok	(South Korea) Choi Bok-eum	(United States) Rhino Page	(Norway) Tore Torgersen
2010 Munich	(United States) Bill O'Neill	(United States) Chris Barnes	(South Korea) Jang Don-chul
2013 Henderson	(United States) Chris Barnes	(South Korea) Cho Young-seon	(United States) Bill O'Neill
2014 Abu Dhabi	(South Korea) Choi Bok-eum	(United States) Mike Fagan	(Canada) Dan MacLelland
2017 Las Vegas	(Chinese Taipei) Wu Hao-ming	(Finland) Petteri Salonen	(United States) A. J. Johnson
2018 Hong Kong	(United States) E. J. Tackett	(United States) Andrew Anderson	(Canada) Dan MacLelland

==== Masters ====
Games	Gold	Silver	Bronze
1954 Helsinki	(Sweden) Gösta Algeskog	(Finland) Osmo Koivunen	(Finland) Kauko Ahlström
1955 Essen	(Sweden) Nisse Bäckström	(Sweden) Henry Gustafsson	None awarded
1955 Essen	(Sweden) Nisse Bäckström	(Finland) Matti Nieminen	None awarded
1958 Helsingborg	(Finland) Kalle Asukas	(Sweden) Gösta Algeskog	(Sweden) Bernt Hellström
1960 Hamburg	(Mexico) Tito Reynolds	(Venezuela) Miguel Correa	(Mexico) Miguel Anaya
1963 Mexico City	(United States) Les Zikes	(United States) Jim Stefanich	(Mexico) Avelino Martínez
1967 Malmö	(England) David Pond	(Japan) Jyunnosuke Yamanaka	(United States) Wayne Pinkalla
1971 Milwaukee	(United States) Ed Luther	(Belgium) Edmond Claws	(United States) Bob Glaser
1975 London	(United States) Marvin Stoudt	(Norway) Arne Svein Strøm	(Finland) Matti Nieminen
1979 Manila	(England) Gerry Bugden	(France) Philippe Dubois	(Malaysia) J.B. Koo
1983 Caracas	(United States) Tony Cariello	(Sweden) Mats Karlsson	(Canada) Ron Allenby
1987 Helsinki	(Belgium) Roger Pieters	(United States) Rick Steelsmith	(Finland) Tom Hahl
1991 Singapore	(Finland) Mika Koivuniemi	(Finland) Teemu Raatikainen	(Sweden) Tomas Leandersson
1995 Reno	(Chinese Taipei) Yang Chen-Min	(Sweden) Raymond Jansson	(United States) Chris Barnes
1999 Abu Dhabi	(Qatar) Ahmed Shaheen	(Belgium) Gery Verbruggen	(Finland) Ari Halme
2003 Kuala Lumpur	(Australia) Michael Little	(United States) Tim Mack	(United Arab Emirates) Mohammed al-Qubaisi
2006 Busan	(Philippines) Biboy Rivera	(Germany) Achim Grabowski	(Australia) Jason Belmonte
2006 Busan	(Philippines) Biboy Rivera	(Germany) Achim Grabowski	(United States) Rhino Page
2008 Bangkok	(United States) Walter Ray Williams Jr.	(Denmark) Jesper Agerbo	(England) Dominic Barrett
2008 Bangkok	(United States) Walter Ray Williams Jr.	(Denmark) Jesper Agerbo	(Finland) Osku Palermaa
2010 Munich	(United States) Chris Barnes	(United States) Patrick Allen	(United States) Wes Malott
2010 Munich	(United States) Chris Barnes	(United States) Patrick Allen	(South Korea) Choi Bok-eum
2013 Henderson	(South Korea) Cho Young-seon	(United States) Chris Barnes	(South Korea) Shin Seung-hyeon
2013 Henderson	(South Korea) Cho Young-seon	(United States) Chris Barnes	(South Korea) Kim Jun-yung
2014 Abu Dhabi	(South Korea) Kang Hee-won	(United States) Mike Fagan	(South Korea) Choi Bok-eum
2014 Abu Dhabi	(South Korea) Kang Hee-won	(United States) Mike Fagan	(South Korea) Park Jong-woo
2017 Las Vegas	(Canada) François Lavoie	(Chinese Taipei) Xu Zhe-jia	(Colombia) Andrés Gómez
2017 Las Vegas	(Canada) François Lavoie	(Chinese Taipei) Xu Zhe-jia	(Denmark) Thomas Larsen
2018 Hong Kong	(Canada) Mitch Hupe	(United States) Kyle Troup	(Canada) Dan MacLelland
2018 Hong Kong	(Canada) Mitch Hupe	(United States) Kyle Troup	(Republic of Ireland) Christopher Sloan

=== Women ===
==== Singles ====
Games	Gold	Silver	Bronze
1979 Manila	(Philippines) Lita dela Rosa	(Sweden) Yvonne Nilsson	(Thailand) Orawan Nithinakakorn
1983 Caracas	(Sweden) Lena Sulkanen	(Sweden) Aasa Larsson	(Sweden) Karin Glennert
1987 Helsinki	(Mexico) Edda Piccini	(South Korea) Lee Ji-yeon	(United States) Nellie Glandon
1991 Singapore	(Germany) Martina Beckel	(United States) Lynda Norry	(Finland) Sari Yrjola
1995 Reno	(Canada) Debby Ship	(United States) Elisabeth Johnson	(Hong Kong) Catherine Che
1999 Abu Dhabi	(United States) Kelly Kulick	(Germany) Andrea Mirschel	(Malaysia) Shalin Zulkifli
2003 Kuala Lumpur	(England) Zara Glover	(Colombia) Rocio Restrepo	(Canada) Piritta Crawford
2005 Aalborg	(Malaysia) Esther Cheah	(China) Zhang Yuhong	(South Africa) Annelize di Pisani
2007 Monterrey	(United States) Shannon O'Keefe	(Australia) Ann-Maree Putney	(Malaysia) Wendy Chai
2009 Las Vegas	(United States) Stefanie Nation	(Mexico) Sandra Góngora	(Denmark) Anja Ginge Jensen
2009 Las Vegas	(United States) Stefanie Nation	(Mexico) Sandra Góngora	(Finland) Krista Pöllänen
2011 Hong Kong	(Malaysia) Jacqueline Sijore	(South Korea) Son Yun-hee	(Singapore) Shayna Ng
2011 Hong Kong	(Malaysia) Jacqueline Sijore	(South Korea) Son Yun-hee	(Denmark) Mai Ginge Jensen
2013 Henderson	(South Korea) Ryu Seo-yeon	(Chinese Taipei) Wang Ya-ting	(Chinese Taipei) Huang Chiung-yao
2013 Henderson	(South Korea) Ryu Seo-yeon	(Chinese Taipei) Wang Ya-ting	(Puerto Rico) Mariana Ayala
2015 Abu Dhabi	(South Korea) Jeon Eun-hee	(Singapore) Cherie Tan	(Singapore) Shayna Ng
2015 Abu Dhabi	(South Korea) Jeon Eun-hee	(Singapore) Cherie Tan	(South Korea) Hwang Yeon-ju
2017 Las Vegas	(Japan) Futaba Imai	(Denmark) Mai Ginge Jensen	(Hong Kong) Chan Shuk Han
2017 Las Vegas	(Japan) Futaba Imai	(Denmark) Mai Ginge Jensen	(South Korea) Hong Haeni
2019 Las Vegas	(United States) Danielle McEwan	(United States) Shannon O'Keefe	(South Korea) Lee Na-young
2019 Las Vegas	(United States) Danielle McEwan	(United States) Shannon O'Keefe	(Sweden) Sandra Andersson

==== Doubles ====
Games	Gold	Silver	Bronze
1963 Mexico City	United States; Helen Shablis; Dorothy Wilkinson	United States; Ruth Redfox; Ann Heyman	Mexico; Irma Urrea; Mele Anaya
1967 Malmö	Mexico; Tea Orozco; Alicia Sarabia	United States; Jean Stehle; Helen Weston	Mexico; Christina Rosas; Irma Urrea
1971 Milwaukee	Japan; Yoshimi Fukuda; Michiko Horooka	United States; Penne McClain; Dixie Burmeister	United States; Jacquline Kott; Ranae Adams
1975 London	Sweden; Britt Cederbrink; Svea Ljungkvist	United States; Carol Gaddis; Carol Schemers	Australia; Del Da-Re; Dale Gray
1979 Manila	Philippines; Lita De La Rosa; Bong Coo	Finland; Eija Krogerus; Tuula Kaartinen	Japan; Kyogo Yamaguchi; Harumi Morisaki
1983 Caracas	Denmark; Birgitte Jensen; Jette Hansen	Finland; Tuula Kartinen; Airi Lappala	England; Judy Robins; Jane Virot
1987 Helsinki	United States; Cora Fiebig; Kathy Wodka	Sweden; Aasa Larsson; Annette Hägre	Austria; Chris Felchmann; Hilde Reidermaier
1991 Singapore	Japan; Tomoko Hatanaka; Kumiko Inatsu	Canada; Jane Amlinger; Catharine Willis	United States; Lynda Norry; Maureen Webb
1995 Reno	Thailand; Kanit Kitchatham; Phetchara Kaewsuk	Finland; Jaana Puhakka; Pauliina Aalto	Singapore; Katherine Lee; Jesmine Ho
1999 Abu Dhabi	Australia; Joy Haymen; Amanda Bradley	Malaysia; Shalin Zulkifli; Sarah Yap	Australia; Sue Cassel; Ann-Maree Putney
2003 Kuala Lumpur	England; Zara Glover; Kirsten Penny	United States; Lucy Sandelin; Diandra Hyman	Venezuela; Patricia Ciotti; Alicia Marcano
2005 Aalborg	Germany; Martina Beckel; Tanya Petty	Denmark; Britt Bröndsted; Kamilla Kjeldsen	United States; Lynda Barnes; Shannon Pluhowsky
2007 Monterrey	South Korea; Jin A. Choy; Bo Ra Nam	South Korea; Min Young-gye; Yeau Jin Kim	United States; Lynda Barnes; Tennelee Milligan
2009 Las Vegas	South Korea; Hwang Sun-ok; Gang Hye-eun	Australia; Carol Gianotti; Ann-Maree Putney	Denmark; Rikke H. Rasmussen; Anne Gales
2009 Las Vegas	South Korea; Hwang Sun-ok; Gang Hye-eun	Australia; Carol Gianotti; Ann-Maree Putney	South Korea; Son Yun-hee; Hong Su-yeon
2011 Hong Kong	United States; Shannon Pluhowsky; Liz Johnson	Singapore; New Hui Fen; Jazreel Tan	United States; Kelly Kulick; Carolyn Dorin-Ballard
2011 Hong Kong	United States; Shannon Pluhowsky; Liz Johnson	Singapore; New Hui Fen; Jazreel Tan	Denmark; Kamilla Kjeldsen; Mai Ginge Jensen
2013 Henderson	United States; Shannon O'Keefe; Stefanie Nation	United States; Kelly Kulick; Missy Parkin	Australia; Ann-Maree Putney; Carol Gianotti
2013 Henderson	United States; Shannon O'Keefe; Stefanie Nation	United States; Kelly Kulick; Missy Parkin	Venezuela; Karen Marcano; Alicia Marcano
2015 Abu Dhabi	United States; Danielle McEwan; Kelly Kulick	South Korea; Son Hye-rin; Jeon Eun-hee	Denmark; Mai Ginge Jensen; Britt Brøndsted
2015 Abu Dhabi	United States; Danielle McEwan; Kelly Kulick	South Korea; Son Hye-rin; Jeon Eun-hee	Singapore; Cherie Tan; Shayna Ng
2017 Las Vegas	South Korea; Jung Da-wun; Kim Moon-jeong	Malaysia; Li Jane Sin; Shalin Zulkifli	United States; Danielle McEwan; Kelly Kulick
2017 Las Vegas	South Korea; Jung Da-wun; Kim Moon-jeong	Malaysia; Li Jane Sin; Shalin Zulkifli	United States; Josie Barnes; Shannon O'Keefe
2019 Las Vegas	Sweden; Josefin Hermansson; Jenny Wegner	South Korea; Son Hye-rin; Lee Yeon-ji	Colombia; Rocio Restrepo; María Rodríguez
2019 Las Vegas	Sweden; Josefin Hermansson; Jenny Wegner	South Korea; Son Hye-rin; Lee Yeon-ji	Colombia; Juliana Franco; Clara Guerrero

==== Trios ====
Games	Gold	Silver	Bronze
1979 Manila	United States; Annese Kelly; Cindy Schuble; Jackie Stormo	Philippines; Bong Coo; Nellie Castillo; Lita de la Rosa	Sweden; Ingrid Sellgren; Annette Hägre; Yvonne Nilsson
1983 Caracas	West Germany; Hani Hoplitchek; Christen Huesler; Gisela Lins	United States; Dixie Kirk; Yvonne Dowland; Janine DitchKirk Philippines; Bong Coo; Arianne Cerdeña; Lita de la Rosa	Not Awarded
1987 Helsinki	United States; Sue Holton; Karen Bender; Nellie Glandon	Sweden; Carina Eriksson; Monica Johansson; Gerda Öhman	United States; Cora Fiebig; Sandra Jo Shiery; Kathy Wodka
1991 Singapore	Canada; Catherine Willis; Jane Amlinger; Anne Saasto	Sweden; Aasa Larsson; Carina Eriksson; Annette Hägre	Sweden; Monica Johansson; Marie Holmquist; Gerda Öhman
1995 Reno	Australia; Cara Honeychurch; Sharon Mcleish; Sue Cassell	Malaysia; Shalin Sulkifli; Lisa Kwan; Shirley Chow	Chinese Taipei; Su Fen-tseng; Su Ling-tsai; Miao Ling-chou
1999 Abu Dhabi	South Korea; Park Jin-hee; Kim Sun-hwa; Lee Ji-yeon	Japan; Mari Mimura; Ayano Katai; Hiroko Shimizu	United States; Tennelle Grijalva; Diandra Hyman; Kelly Kulick
2003 Kuala Lumpur	Philippines; Liza del Rosario; Liza Clutario; Cecilia Yap	England; Zara Glover; Kirsten Penny; Lisa John	United States; Lucy Sandelin; Diandra Hyman; Emma Rutten
2005 Aalborg	Chinese Taipei; Yu Ling-wang; Chiung Yao-huang; Miao Lin-chou	Singapore; Jennifer Tan; Alice Tay; Valerie Teo	Denmark; Anja Ginge Jensen; Rikke H. Rasmussen; Rikke Simonsen
2007 Monterrey	Sweden; Helén Johnsson; Malin Glendert; Nina Flack	United States; Lynda Barnes; Shannon O'Keefe; Tennelee Milligan	South Korea; Jin A. choy Yeau Jin-kim; Bo Ra-nam
2009 Las Vegas	Chinese Taipei; Yang Hao-ting; Tsai Hsin-yi; Tang Ya-chun	United States; Carolyn D. Ballard; Liz Johnson; Stefanie Nation	Denmark; Rikke H. Rasmussen; Kamilla Kjeldsen; Anne Gales
2009 Las Vegas	Chinese Taipei; Yang Hao-ting; Tsai Hsin-yi; Tang Ya-chun	United States; Carolyn D. Ballard; Liz Johnson; Stefanie Nation	Japan; Ayano Katai; Maki Nakano; Nao Ohishi
2011 Hong Kong	United States; Stefanie Nation; Shannon Pluhowsky; Shannon O'Keefe	Japan; Natsuki Sasaki; Haruka Matsuda; Kanako Ishimine	South Korea; Hwank Suk-ok; Jeon Eun-hee; Son Yun-hee
2011 Hong Kong	United States; Stefanie Nation; Shannon Pluhowsky; Shannon O'Keefe	Japan; Natsuki Sasaki; Haruka Matsuda; Kanako Ishimine	United States; Carolyn D. Ballard; Liz Johnson; Kelly Kulick
2013 Henderson	South Korea; Seo Yeon-ryu; Na Young-lee; Yun Hee-son	Canada; Isabelle Rioux; Samantha How; Caroline Lagrange	England; Autum Chamberlain; Hayley Rumkee; Lisa John
2013 Henderson	South Korea; Seo Yeon-ryu; Na Young-lee; Yun Hee-son	Canada; Isabelle Rioux; Samantha How; Caroline Lagrange	Japan; Natsuki Teshima; Misaki Mukotani; Haruka Matsuda
2015 Abu Dhabi	South Korea; Son Hye-rin; Kim Jin-sun; Baek Seung-ja	Singapore; Cherie Tan; Shayna Ng; New Hui Fen	United States; Shannon Pluhowsky; Kelly Kulick; Liz Johnson
2015 Abu Dhabi	South Korea; Son Hye-rin; Kim Jin-sun; Baek Seung-ja	Singapore; Cherie Tan; Shayna Ng; New Hui Fen	England; Danni Hopcroft; Jo Allsebrook; Lisa John
2017 Las Vegas	United States; Shannon O'Keefe; Danielle McEwan; Kelly Kulick	Germany; Janine Gabel; Tina Hulsch; Patricia Luoto	Indonesia; Putty Armein; Sharon Limansantoso; Tannya Roumimper
2017 Las Vegas	United States; Shannon O'Keefe; Danielle McEwan; Kelly Kulick	Germany; Janine Gabel; Tina Hulsch; Patricia Luoto	Chinese Taipei; Su Shu-wen; Pan Yu-fen; Chou Chia-chen
2019 Las Vegas	United States; Missy Parkin; Jordan Richard; Liz Kuhlkin	Colombia; Juliana Franco; María Rodríguez; Clara Guerrero	Mexico; Adriana Perez; Paola Limon; Sandra Góngora
2019 Las Vegas	United States; Missy Parkin; Jordan Richard; Liz Kuhlkin	Colombia; Juliana Franco; María Rodríguez; Clara Guerrero	South Korea; Kim Moon-jeong; Baek Seung-ja; Jung Da-wun

==== 5er teams ====
Games	Gold	Silver	Bronze
1963 Mexico City	Mexico	United States	Finland
1967 Malmö	Finland	United States	Mexico
1971 Milwaukee	United States	Australia	Venezuela
1975 London	Japan	Australia	West Germany
1979 Manila	United States	West Germany	Australia
1983 Caracas	Sweden	Japan	United States
1987 Helsinki	United States	Sweden	Australia
1991 Singapore	South Korea	Finland	Germany
1995 Reno	Finland	Sweden	France
1999 Abu Dhabi	South Korea	Colombia	United States
2003 Kuala Lumpur	Malaysia	Sweden	Colombia
2005 Aalborg	Chinese Taipei	United States	Denmark
2007 Monterrey	Malaysia	United States	England
2009 Las Vegas	South Korea	United States	Singapore
2009 Las Vegas	South Korea	United States	Sweden
2011 Hong Kong	United States	Singapore	Germany
2011 Hong Kong	United States	Singapore	Colombia
2013 Henderson	South Korea; Seo Yeon-ryu; Na Young-lee; Moon Jeong-kim; Da Wu-jung; Yun Hee-son; Seung Ja-baek	United States; Stefanie Nation; Missy Parkin; Shannon O'Keefe; Kelly Kulick; Liz Johnson; Shannon Pluhowsky	Malaysia; Siti Safiyah; Jacqueline Sijore; Esther Chea; Shalin Zulkifli; Li Jane Sin; Zandra Aziela
2013 Henderson	South Korea; Seo Yeon-ryu; Na Young-lee; Moon Jeong-kim; Da Wu-jung; Yun Hee-son; Seung Ja-baek	United States; Stefanie Nation; Missy Parkin; Shannon O'Keefe; Kelly Kulick; Liz Johnson; Shannon Pluhowsky	Venezuela; Patricia de Faria; Esther Álvarez; Joan González; Karen Marcano; Alicia Marcano; Eny Díaz
2015 Abu Dhabi	United States; Shannon Pluhowsky; Shannon O'Keefe; Kelly Kulick; Danielle McEwan; Liz Johnson	South Korea; Son Hye-rin; Jeon Eun-hee; Kim Jin-sun; Jung Da-wun; Baek Seung-ja	Germany; Laura Beuthner; Martina Schütz; Patricia Luoto; Nadine Geissler; Birgit Pöppler
2015 Abu Dhabi	United States; Shannon Pluhowsky; Shannon O'Keefe; Kelly Kulick; Danielle McEwan; Liz Johnson	South Korea; Son Hye-rin; Jeon Eun-hee; Kim Jin-sun; Jung Da-wun; Baek Seung-ja	Singapore; Cherie Tan; Daphne Tan; Shayna Ng; New Hui Fen; Jazreel Tan
2017 Las Vegas	Malaysia; Syaidatul Afifah; Natasha Roslan; Siti Safiyah; Shalin Zulkifli; Li Jane Sin	Singapore; New Hui Fen; Shayna Ng; Daphne Tan; Jazreel Tan; Cherie Tan	Colombia; Clara Guerrero; Anggie Ramírez; Rocio Restrepo; María Rodríguez; Juliana Franco
2017 Las Vegas	Malaysia; Syaidatul Afifah; Natasha Roslan; Siti Safiyah; Shalin Zulkifli; Li Jane Sin	Singapore; New Hui Fen; Shayna Ng; Daphne Tan; Jazreel Tan; Cherie Tan	South Korea; Baek Seung-ja; Jung Da-wun; Kim Min-hee; Kim Moon-jeong; Lee Na-young
2019 Las Vegas	Colombia; Juliana Franco; Rocio Restrepo; Laura Plazas; Clara Guerrero; María Rodríguez	Sweden; Josefin Hermansson; Joline Persson Planefors; Cajsa Wegner; Jenny Wegner; Sandra Andersson	United States; Missy Parkin; Liz Kuhlkin; Stefanie Johnson; Danielle McEwan; Shannon O'Keefe
2019 Las Vegas	Colombia; Juliana Franco; Rocio Restrepo; Laura Plazas; Clara Guerrero; María Rodríguez	Sweden; Josefin Hermansson; Joline Persson Planefors; Cajsa Wegner; Jenny Wegner; Sandra Andersson	Mexico; Adriana Perez; Aseret Zetter; Paola Limon; Sandra Góngora; Iliana Lomeli

==== All-events ====
Games	Gold	Silver	Bronze
1979 Manila	(Philippines) Bong Coo	(Sweden) Yvonne Nilsson	(Philippines) Lita dela Rosa
1983 Caracas	(Philippines) Bong Coo	(Sweden) Lena Sulkanen	(Sweden) Aasa Larsson
1987 Helsinki	(United States) Sandra-Jo Shiery	(Mexico) Edda Piccini	(Sweden) Aasa Larsson
1991 Singapore	(Denmark) Helle Andersen	(Canada) Catharine Willis	(Japan) Kumiko Inatsu
1995 Reno	(Finland) Jaana Puhakka	(Australia) Cara Honeychurch	(Sweden) Aasa Larsson
1999 Abu Dhabi	(Australia) Amanda Bradley	(Malaysia) Shalin Zulkifli	(Germany) Andrea Mirschel
2003 Kuala Lumpur	(England) Zara Glover	(United States) Diandra Hyman	(Philippines) Liza Clutario
2005 Aalborg	(Chinese Taipei) Wang Yu-ling	(United States) Lynda Barnes	(Malaysia) Lai Kin Ngoh
2007 Monterrey	(South Korea) Choi Jin-a	(United States) Tennelle Milligan	(Australia) Ann-Maree Putney
2009 Las Vegas	(Colombia) Clara Guerrero	(Sweden) Helén Johnsson	(United States) Carolyn Dorin-Ballard
2011 Hong Kong	(Denmark) Mai Ginge Jensen	(Canada) Caroline Lagrange	(United States) Shannon Pluhowsky
2013 Henderson	(United States) Shannon O'Keefe	(South Korea) Son Yun-hee	(Latvia) Diana Zavjalova
2015 Abu Dhabi	(Singapore) Shayna Ng	(United States) Liz Johnson	(South Korea) Jeon Eun-hee
2017 Las Vegas	(United States) Danielle McEwan	(Malaysia) Siti Safiyah	(Chinese Taipei) Tsai Hsin-yi
2019 Las Vegas	(Colombia) María Rodríguez	(Sweden) Joline Persson Planefors	(United States) Shannon O'Keefe

==== Masters ====
Games	Gold	Silver	Bronze
1963 Mexico City	(United States) Helen Shablis	(Mexico) Gracelia Aguirre	(United States) Dorothy Wilkinson
1967 Malmö	(United States) Helen Weston	(Finland) Eija Krogerus	(United States) Jean Stehle
1971 Milwaukee	(Puerto Rico) Ashie González	(United States) Dixie Burmeister	(United States) Penny McClain
1975 London	(West Germany) Anne-Dore Häfker	(Finland) Eija Krogerus	(United States) Carol Schemers
1979 Manila	(Philippines) Lita dela Rosa	(West Germany) Daniela Gruber	(Sweden) Yvonne Nilsson
1983 Caracas	(Sweden) Lena Sulkanen	(United States) Cathey Almeida	(Japan) Kumiko Inatsu
1987 Helsinki	(Sweden) Anette Hägre	(Mexico) Mayumi Hayashi	(Australia) Carol Gianotti
1991 Singapore	(Canada) Catharine Willis	(Malaysia) Lisa Kwan	(Puerto Rico) María Ortiz
1995 Reno	(Mexico) Celia Flores	(Sweden) Aasa Larsson	(Colombia) Luz Leal
1999 Abu Dhabi	(Australia) Ann-Maree Putney	(Germany) Andrea Mirschel	(England) Kirsten Penny
2003 Kuala Lumpur	(United States) Diandra Hyman	(Philippines) Liza Clutario	(South Korea) Lee Eun-ock
2005 Aalborg	(China) Yang Suiling	(Chinese Taipei) Wang Yu-ling	(United States) Lynda Barnes
2007 Monterrey	(United States) Diandra Asbaty	(Singapore) Jazreel Tan	(South Korea) Kim Yeau-jin
2007 Monterrey	(United States) Diandra Asbaty	(Singapore) Jazreel Tan	(United States) Tennelle Milligan
2009 Las Vegas	(Colombia) Clara Guerrero	(South Korea) Hwang Sun-ok	(South Korea) Gang Hye-eun
2009 Las Vegas	(Colombia) Clara Guerrero	(South Korea) Hwang Sun-ok	(South Korea) Son Yun-hee
2011 Hong Kong	(United States) Shannon Pluhowsky	(Singapore) Daphne Tan	(Denmark) Mai Ginge Jensen
2011 Hong Kong	(United States) Shannon Pluhowsky	(Singapore) Daphne Tan	(Germany) Nadine Geisler
2013 Henderson	(South Korea) Son Yun-hee	(South Korea) Kim Moon-jeong	(South Korea) Ryu Seo-yeon
2013 Henderson	(South Korea) Son Yun-hee	(South Korea) Kim Moon-jeong	(United States) Liz Johnson
2015 Abu Dhabi	(South Korea) Jung Da-wun	(United States) Liz Johnson	(United States) Danielle McEwan
2015 Abu Dhabi	(South Korea) Jung Da-wun	(United States) Liz Johnson	(South Korea) Jeon Eun-hee
2017 Las Vegas	(South Korea) Jung Da-wun	(Malaysia) Li Jane Sin	(Indonesia) Sharon Limansantoso
2017 Las Vegas	(South Korea) Jung Da-wun	(Malaysia) Li Jane Sin	(Singapore) Shayna Ng
2019 Las Vegas	(Singapore) Cherie Tan	(Colombia) María Rodríguez	(United States) Danielle McEwan
2019 Las Vegas	(Singapore) Cherie Tan	(Colombia) María Rodríguez	(Finland) Sanna Pasanen

== Discontinued events ==
=== Men ===
==== 8er teams ====
Games	Gold	Silver	Bronze
1954 Helsinki	Sweden	Finland	West Germany
1955 Essen	Finland	Sweden	West Germany
1958 Helsingborg	Sweden	West Germany	Venezuela
1960 Hamburg	Mexico	Finland	Sweden
1963 Mexico City	USA	Mexico	Venezuela
1967 Malmö	USA	Japan	Mexico
1971 Milwaukee	USA	Mexico	Venezuela
1975 London	West Germany	Canada	England

=== Women ===
==== 4er teams ====
Games	Gold	Silver	Bronze
1963 Mexico City	Mexico	None awarded	Finland
1963 Mexico City	USA	None awarded	Finland
1967 Malmö	Finland	West Germany	Belgium
1971 Milwaukee	USA	Australia	Mexico
1975 London	Japan	USA	Australia
