= World Ranking Masters =

International ranking system of ten-pin bowling

The World Ranking Masters was ten-pin bowling's international ranking system, as with professional tennis. It was governed by the World Tenpin Bowling Association (WTBA). The rankings were formulated at the end of the three international tours, the European, Americas (not "American", although it does cover the US) and Asian tours.

The last World Ranking Masters was conducted by WTBA in 2009.

== Organisation ==
It was divided into the following geographical Zones/Tours:

- American Bowling Federation which consists of North and South America and has the Americas Bowling Tour.
- Asian Bowling Federation which consists of Asia, Australia, Western Pacific and has the Asian Bowling Tour.
- European Tenpin Bowling Federation (ETBF) which consists of Europe and South Africa and is host to the European Bowling Tour (EBT) (similar to that of the PBA's Tour)

When all three vast tours were complete, the top 8 bowlers over the three tours were invited each year to the World Ranking Masters.

For example, with the EBT, the list can be found on the official ETBF website . It is also reported on in the leading Tenpin news site .

The World Ranking Masters is played on the "Dual Condition" format. Over the years the format has changed. The current qualifying format takes place over 3 days, with 8 games being played each day. The first day is played on a "long" lane pattern (oiled to around 44 ft), the second on a "short" pattern (oiled to around 35 ft). The final day is played on a "mixed" pattern (each lane is dressed alternately with the long and short patterns).

The top 8 men and top 8 women over the 24 games qualify for the single-elimination matchplay finals. The finalists are seeded according to their final position in qualifying. The finals are played using "best of 3" matchplay style on alternating lane patterns. The higher seeded player has the choice of which pattern to start on.

These patterns force the players to attack the 2 different lane conditions using different angles/equipment/hand positions and is the best way to determine the player with the most skills, versatility and knowledge.

== 2007 - Lake Wales, Florida ==
The 2007 World Ranking Masters event will be held in the Kegel Training centre, Lake Wales, Florida after the original Hosts, Qatar withdrew from hosting the event in February 2007.

The five-day competition will start May 3 and will conclude with the TV finals on May 7.

"We have TV again. It will be a 90-minute show this time, maybe even two hours", Kegel founder John Davis proudly stated. "The county made the decision to back the show. It seems they were very happy with our performance and ratings last time."

It marks the third time after 2003 and 2005 that the prestigious event will come to the Kegel headquarters.

"This will be the 7th edition of this tournament and we are proud to be able to have the tournament at our Kegel Training and Tournament centre here in Lake Wales, Florida for the third time", said Del Warren, Tournament Manager and Vice President of Kegel Training and Tournament centre. "In fact, I think we will make the theme of this tournament 'A Celebration of the Sport of Bowling'.

The World Ranking Masters features the top eight men and top eight women from each of the three WTBA zones (American, European and Asian) plus one male and one female bowler to be picked by the host - a total of 25 men and 25 women.

Sara Vargas, Colombia, will be on hand to defend the women's title while Khalid Al Dubyan of Kuwait, the 2006 men's World Ranking Masters champion did not qualify through the Asian rankings.

As tournament hosts, Kegel and USBC jointly selected Team USA members Bill Hoffman of Columbus, Ohio, and Diandra Asbaty of Chicago to represent the United States in the event. However, just before the start of the tournament Bill Hoffman had to unfortunately withdraw due to a foot injury. Hoffman was replaced at short notice by Team USA team-mate, David O'Sullivan of Orlando, Florida.

The Kegel/USBC World Ranking Masters will have a first prize of $10,000 US Dollars for both the men and the women and we will be paying down to 10th place.

"We will also be unveiling a few new ideas to help promote the sport of bowling with the goal of elevating our sport to the next level", Warren added.

"We want to express our gratitude to the World Tenpin Bowling Association for their confidence and willingness to give us the opportunity to host this prestigious event."

As earlier reported, the Qatar Bowling Federation (QBF) withdrew as host of the 2007 World Ranking Masters, which should originally take place in Doha, from April 30 through May 6. Three countries wanted to step in and have sent an application to the World Tenpin Bowling Association (WTBA), the USA], Finland and Indonesia. The WTBA decided in favour of the Kegel/USBC bid.

=== Participants - Women's Division ===
American Zone

- (Colombia) Rocio Restrepo
- (Canada) Caroline Lagrange
- (Colombia) Paola Gómez
- (Colombia) Sara Vargas
- (Venezuela) Karen Marcano
- (Venezuela) Alicia Marcano
- (Canada) Lynne Gauthier
- (Dominican Republic) Aumi Guerra

Asian Zone

- (Indonesia) Putty Armein
- (Malaysia) Shalin Zulkifli
- (Malaysia) Esther Cheah
- (Malaysia) Lai Kin Ngoh
- (Indonesia) Tannya Roumimper
- (Malaysia) Zandra Aziela
- (Malaysia) Choy Poh Lai
- (Malaysia) Wendy Chai

European Zone

- (Denmark) Britt Brøndsted
- (England) Zara Glover
- (Sweden) Nina Flack
- (France) Isabelle Saldjian
- (Sweden) Helén Johnsson
- (Sweden) Anna Mattsson-Baard
- (Germany) Patricia Schwarz
- (Austria) Ivonne Gross

Host Country Pick

- (United States) Diandra Asbaty

=== Participants - Men's Division ===
American Zone

- (Venezuela) Arturo Hernández
- (Puerto Rico) Luis Rodriguez
- (Canada) Mark Buffa
- (Colombia) David Romero
- (Puerto Rico) Francisco Colon
- (Dominican Republic) Rolando Antonio Sebelen
- (Colombia) Manuel Otalora
- (Colombia) Jaime Monroy

Asian Zone

- (Singapore) Remy Ong
- (Indonesia) Ryan Lalisang
- (Hong Kong) Wu Siu Hong
- (Malaysia) Alex Liew
- (Malaysia) Azidi Ameran
- (Philippines) Biboy Rivera
- (Thailand) Yannaphon Larpapharat
- (Malaysia) Zulmazran Zulkifli

European Zone

- (England) Paul Moor
- (Finland) Osku Palermaa
- (Sweden) Peter Ljung
- (England) Stuart Williams
- (Sweden) Martin Larsen
- (Austria) Thomas Gross
- (Australia) Jason Belmonte
- (Finland) Kai Virtanen

Host Country Pick

- (United States) David O'Sullivan

(Late replacement for Bill Hoffman)

=== Results ===
==== Kan Jam World Rankings ====
Top 8 (highlighted) qualify for quarter finals.

Pos.	Player	Country	Long Oil	Short Oil	Mixed Pattern	Total Score	Avg
1	Osku Palermaa	Finland	1909	1943	1946	5798	241.58
2	Jason Belmonte	Australia	1913	1845	1806	5564	231.83
3	Stuart Williams	England	1872	1940	1711	5523	230.13
4	Conor Fennell	Ireland	1969	1703	1782	5454	227.25
5	Martin Larsen	Sweden	1828	1861	1731	5420	225.83
6	Mossellem and Wilkie	USA	1898	1814	1693	5405	225.21
7	Peter Ljung	Sweden	1808	1757	1825	5390	224.58
8	Thomas and Gross	Austria	1820	1678	1881	5379	224.13
9	Remy and Ong	Singapore	1969	1712	1679	5360	223.33
10	Mark and Buffa	Canada	1863	1782	1690	5335	222.29
11	Manuel Otalora	Colombia	1729	1748	1842	5319	221.63
12	Biboy Rivera	Philippines	1809	1766	1725	5300	220.83

==== Qualifying - Women (top 12 only) ====
Top 8 (highlighted) qualify for quarter finals

Pos.	Player	Country	Long Oil	Short Oil	Mixed Pattern	Total Score	Avg
1	Caroline Lagrange	Canada	1885	1861	1755	5501	229.21
2	Diandra Asbaty	USA	1637	1901	1924	5462	227.58
3	Wendy Chai	Malaysia	1659	1750	1856	5265	219.38
4	Zara Glover	England	1859	1695	1696	5250	218.75
5	Zandra Aziela	Malaysia	1599	1741	1875	5215	217.29
6	Aumi Guerra	Dominican Republic	1804	1676	1718	5198	216.58
7	Patricia Schwarz	Germany	1739	1657	1798	5194	216.42
8	Alicia Marcano	Venezuela	1662	1757	1765	5184	216.00
9	Helén Johnsson	Sweden	1633	1795	1745	5173	215.54
10	Putty Armein	Indonesia	1742	1701	1715	5158	214.92
11	Paola Gómez	Colombia	1731	1663	1731	5125	214.92
12	Tannya Roumimper	Indonesia	1691	1715	1656	5062	210.92

==== Quarter Finals - Men ====
Seed	Player	Score	Seed	Player	Game scores
1	(Finland) Osku Palermaa	0 - 2	8	(Austria) Thomas Gross	196-265, 203-207
2	(Australia) Jason Belmonte	0 - 2	7	(Sweden) Peter Ljung	190-258, 158-279
3	(England) Stuart Williams	2 - 0	6	(United States) David O'Sullivan	247-191, 240-205
4	(England) Paul Moor	2 - 0	5	(Sweden) Martin Larsen	238-204, 212-204

==== Quarter Finals - Women ====
Seed	Player	Score	Seed	Player	Game scores
1	(Canada) Caroline Lagrange	1 - 2	8	(Venezuela) Alicia Marcano	225-257, 235-213, 237-244
2	(United States) Diandra Asbaty	2 - 0	7	(Germany) Patricia Schwarz	267-220, 234-212
3	(Malaysia) Wendy Chai	1 - 2	6	(Dominican Republic) Aumi Guerra	193-172, 185-202, 221-226
4	(England) Zara Glover	2 - 0	5	(Malaysia) Zandra Aziela	258-223, 213-184

==== Semi Finals - Men ====
Seed	Player	Score	Seed	Player	Game scores
3	(England) Stuart Williams	2 - 1	8	(Austria) Thomas Gross	186-236, 197-151, 206-204
4	(England) Paul Moor	0 - 2	7	(Sweden) Peter Ljung	227-258, 234-246

==== Semi Finals - Women ====
Seed	Player	Score	Seed	Player	Game scores
2	(United States) Diandra Asbaty	2 - 1	8	(Venezuela) Alicia Marcano	186-234, 224-177, 245-165
4	(England) Zara Glover	2 - 0	6	(Dominican Republic) Aumi Guerra	226-183, 233-201

==== Final - Men ====
Seed	Player	Score	Seed	Player	Game scores
3	(England) Stuart Williams	2 - 1	7	(Sweden) Peter Ljung	233-236, 235-224, 269-240

==== Final - Women ====
Seed	Player	Score	Seed	Player	Game Scores
2	(United States) Diandra Asbaty	2 - 0	4	(England) Zara Glover	233-148, 235-220

== Past events ==
=== Previous Finals - Men ===
Year	Location	Winner	Score	Runner-up	Game score
2001	Abu Dhabi, UAE (United Arab Emirates)	(Hong Kong) Sunny Hui	2 - 0	(Qatar) Bandar Al-Shafi	247-225, 226-224
2002	Aalborg, Denmark	(Belgium) Gery Verbruggen	2 - 0	(Sweden) Anders Öhman	247-234, 221-217
2003	Lake Wales, Florida, USA (United States)	(Sweden) Anders Öhman	2 - 1	(United States) Bill Hoffman	237-223, 199-211, 220-179
2004	Moscow, Russia	(United Arab Emirates) Mohammed Al-Qubaisi	2 - 1	(Finland) Lasse Lintilä	188-244, 269-196, 210-190
2005	Lake Wales, Florida, USA (United States)	(Finland) Kimmo Lehtonen	2 - 1	(Finland) Jouni Helminen	204-159, 216-253, 202-151
2006	Kuwait City, Kuwait	(Kuwait) Khalid Al Dubyan	2 - 0	(Finland) Pasi Uotila	172-171, 178-166
2007	Lake Wales, Florida, USA (United States)	(England) Stuart Williams	2 - 1	(Sweden) Peter Ljung	233-236, 235-224, 269-240
2008	Jakarta, Indonesia	(Finland) Jari Ratia	2 - 1	(Malaysia) Zulmazran Zulkifli	248-191, 173-179, 212-185
2009	Naples, Italy	(Finland) Osku Palermaa	2 - 0	(Norway) Tore Torgersen	259-234, 248-238

=== Previous Finals - Women ===
Year	Location	Winner	Score	Runner-up	Game Score
2001	Abu Dhabi, UAE (United Arab Emirates)	(Singapore) Jesmine Ho	2 - 0	(Denmark) Iben Tchu	191-179, 228-174
2002	Aalborg, Denmark	(Singapore) Jennifer Tan	2 - 0	(Singapore) Jesmine Ho	205-172, 223-200
2003	Lake Wales, Florida, USA (United States)	(Denmark) Britt Brøndsted	2 - 0	(Germany) Patricia Schwarz	224-164, 224-215
2004	Moscow, Russia	(United States) Diandra Asbaty	2 - 0	(Malaysia) Shalin Zulkifli	247-163, 277-169
2005	Lake Wales, Florida, USA (United States)	(Colombia) Clara Guerrero	2 - 1	(Malaysia) Wendy Chai	219-235, 214-195, 223-157
2006	Kuwait City, Kuwait	(Colombia) Sara Vargas	2 - 1	(Indonesia) Putty Armein	176-185, 278-193, 187-184
2007	Lake Wales, Florida, USA (United States)	(United States) Diandra Asbaty	2 - 0	(England) Zara Glover	233-148, 235-220
2008	Jakarta, Indonesia	(Malaysia) Wendy Chai	2 - 0	(Venezuela) Karen Marcano	186-181, 220-201
2009	Naples, Italy	(Malaysia) Siti Safiyah Amirah	2 - 0	(Germany) Tina Hulsch	215-199, 175-166
