= International Bowling Hall of Fame =

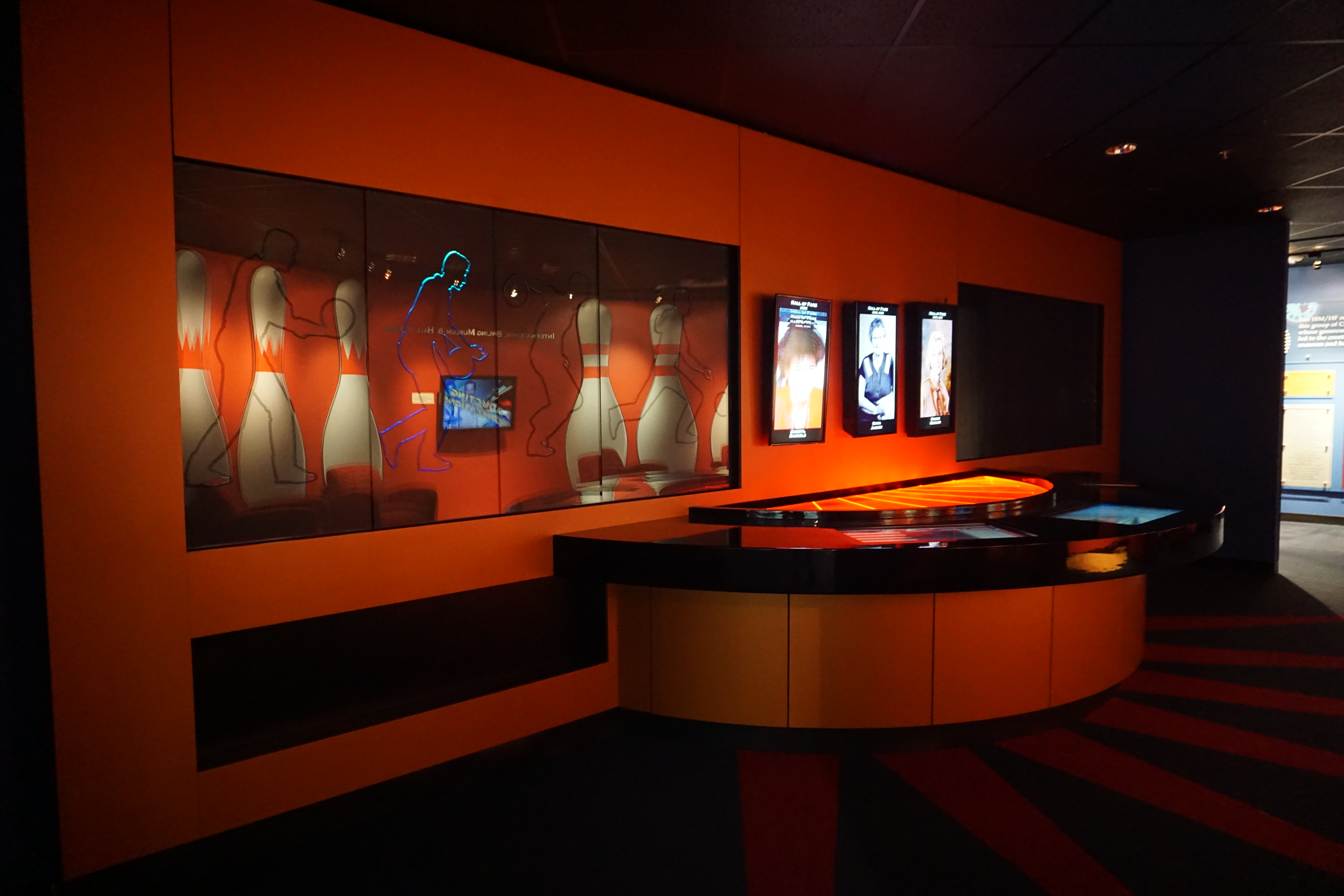
The Hall of Fame at the International Bowling Museum and Hall of Fame

The World Bowling Writers (WBW) International Bowling Hall of Fame was established in 1993 and is located in the International Bowling Museum and Hall of Fame, on the International Bowling Campus in Arlington, Texas.

== History ==
The International Bowling Museum and Hall of Fame was located at 11 Stadium Plaza, St. Louis, Missouri, USA, and shared the same building with the St. Louis Cardinals Hall of Fame Museum, until November 8, 2008. It moved to Arlington and reopened in early 2010. In 2012, the WBW was merged with the International Bowling Media Association. After the merger, the WBW Hall of Fame inductees became part of the IBMA Luby Hall of Fame.

== Criteria for election ==
WBW Hall of Famers are chosen strictly in the basis of athletic performance, to even qualify for consideration, a player must be an amateur and accumulate a minimum of 15 points in any combination of four specifically designated international competitions;

- the International Bowling Federation (IBF) World Championships
- the Bowling World Cup
- the IBF adult Zone Masters Championships
- and the Olympic Games

with gold medals occurring in an event other than five-person team. Five points are credited for a gold medal, three points for silver, and one for bronze.

Each summer, the WBW Administrator scans a database to determine eligible candidates and sends ballots with those players’ names and resumes to current officers of the World Bowling Writers, which formed the Hall's Board.

== Election process ==
There are two election categories: Men and Women. Voters may cast one vote in each category for every three names listed, as well as one vote for any remaining group of fewer than three names in that category. The man and woman who receive the highest number of votes are elected.

In the event of a tie, multiple candidates of the same category may be elected, provided each tied candidate receives at least two-thirds of the total votes cast in that category for that year. If this threshold is not met, no candidate is elected in that category for that year.

== (WBW) International Bowling Hall of Fame members ==
See footnote

Year	Male		Female	
Year	Inductee	Country	Inductee	Country
1993	Paeng Nepomuceno	Philippines	Bong Coo	Philippines
1993	Paeng Nepomuceno	Philippines	Annette Hagre Johannesson	Sweden
1994	Philippe Dubois	France	Jeanette Baker	Australia
1994	Arne Svein Stroem	Norway	Jeanette Baker	Australia
1995	None		None	
1996	Ying-Chieh Ma	Chinese Taipei	Asa Larsson	Sweden
1997	Cheng-Ming Yang	Chinese Taipei	Martina Beckel	Germany
1998	None		Cara Honeychurch	Australia
1999	Les Zikes	United States	Edda Piccini	Mexico
2000	Tomas Leandersson	Sweden	Lita dela Rosa (posthumous)	Philippines
2001	Gosta Algeskog	Sweden	Irma Urrea	Mexico
2002	None		Eija Krogerus	Finland
2003	Kaarlo "Kalle" Asukas	Finland	Pauline Buck	England
2004	Anders Ohman	Sweden	Shalin Zulkifli	Malaysia
2005	None		Diandra Asbaty	United States
2006	Tito Reynolds	Mexico	Lynda Barnes	United States
2007	Tore Torgersen	Norway	Zara Glover	England
2008	Bill Hoffman	United States	Ann-Maree Putney	Australia
2009	Gery Verbruggen	Belgium	Clara Guerrero	Colombia
2010	Mika Koivuniemi	Finland	Kirsten Penny	England
2011	Raymond Jansson	Sweden	Shannon Pluhowsky	United States
2012	None		None	
2013	Osku Palermaa	Finland	Kelly Kulick	United States

- 2013 Inductees

== See also ==
- United States Bowling Congress Hall of Fame
