= Bob Pinkalla =

Robert Pinkalla
- Born: October 7, 1928
- Died: April 13, 2015 (aged 86); Menomonee Falls, Wisconsin, U.S.
- Other names: Bob Pinkalla
- Known for: Bowling

Robert K. Pinkalla (October 7, 1928 – April 13, 2015), better known as Bob Pinkalla, was an American ten-pin bowler and owner of Pinky's Bowl in Milwaukee, Wisconsin.

Pinkalla was born on October 7, 1928. He was married his sweetheart Barbara Granum. Robert and Barbara went to the same High school, Casimir Pulaski High School. Pinkalla was the owner of the family's business, Pinky's Bowl bowling alley and pro shop (AKA Pinkalla's Bowling Lanes), which was started by his father. He won numerous tournaments from the 1940s through the 1970s.

Bob Pinkalla, for the 1959-1960 season, set a world record individual average over 238 and was ranked first nationally with an 837 series. The three-man team of Bob, his brother Wayne, and Gene Raffel, "set an all-time record of 2,404 pins and single-game record of 859, with the Pinkallas both spilling 300 games in the latter."

Bob Pinkalla and his brother Wayne organized and were on the Pinky's Bowl team which won the 1967 American Bowling Congress (ABC) national championship with a record setting 3,327 series. They were the first and only team to break 3,300 until 1989. Bob Pinkalla was the highest scoring team member with 700. Four of the five-man team became part of the eight-man United States team that went on to Sweden to compete in the Fédération Internationale des Quilleurs (FIQ) tournament. He and his brother were awarded a bronze in doubles.

He died of heart failure on April 13, 2015, in Menomonee Falls, Wisconsin, at the age of 86.
