= Nine-pin bowling European Championships =

- Status: inactive
- Genre: sporting event
- Date: varying
- Location: various
- Country: varying
- Inaugurated: 1949
- Most recent: 1964
- Organiser: FIQ
- Website: www.wnba-nbc.de

The nine-pin bowling European Championships was a nine-pin bowling competition organized by the Fédération Internationale des Quilleurs (FIQ). The first European Championships were held in 1949 in Vienna. It was an unofficial competition in which seven countries took part.

The first official ones under the name European Cup were held in 1956 in Erfurt. They were held in the biennial in the years 1956–1960, alternating with the World Championships. The only one official European Championships were held in 1964 in Budapest, as new concept of quadrennial competition alternating with the World Championships. However, this concept was abandoned and since 1966 only the biennial World Championships have been resumed.

In 2019, in Rokycany were inaugurated the 60+ European Championships. It is currently planned for them to be held as a biennial competition since 2020.

== List of championships ==
Edition	Year	City	Country	Date	Events	Top of the medal table	Notes
-	1949	Vienna	Austria	2 - 10 Jul	1	Austria	Unofficial championships. The first ever international competition.
1st	1956	Erfurt	East Germany	13 - 15 Jul	2	East Germany	
2nd	1958	Munich	West Germany	4 - 7 Nov	2	East Germany	
3rd	1960	Zagreb	Yugoslavia	26 Jun - 1 Jul	2	Yugoslavia	
1st	1964	Budapest	Hungary	15 - 20 Jun	6	Yugoslavia	The one and only official European Championship in history.

== Medal count ==
Rank	Nation	Gold	Silver	Bronze	Total
1	East Germany	5	5	1	11
2	Yugoslavia	5	4	3	12
3	Hungary	1	3	4	8
4	Czechoslovakia	1	0	3	4
5	Austria	1	0	0	1
6	Romania	0	1	1	2
7	West Germany	0	0	1	1
Totals (7 entries)		13	13	13	39

== List of hosts ==
List of hosts by number of championships hosted.

Times hosted	Host	Year(s)
1	Austria	1949
1	East Germany	1956
1	Hungary	1964
1	Yugoslavia	1960
1	West Germany	1958
