= Eija =

Eija is a Finnish female given name. Its nameday is the 19th of February. As of January 2013, there are more than 24,500 people registered in Finland with this name. There are also more than 1,200 people with this name in Sweden, but only twenty-eight in Norway one in America, two in Canada, one in England and 2 in Australia. The origin of the name is eijaa a Finnish exclamation of joy.

== Notable people ==
Some notable people who have this name include:

- Eija-Liisa Ahtila (born 1959), Finnish video artist and photographer
- Elja Hyytiäinen (born 1961), Finnish cross country skier
- Eija-Riitta Korhola (born 1959), Finnish politician
- Eija Koskivaara (born 1965), Finnish orienteering competitor
- Eija Krogerus (1932–2018), Finnish bowler
- Eija Vilpas (born 1957), Finnish actress
