= Bowling at the 2001 World Games – Men's singles =

Bowling men's singles at the 2001 World Games
- Venue: Utenayu Bowl, Yokote, Japan
- Date: 22–23 August 2001
- Competitors: 24 from 23 nations

Medalists
gold medal	(Germany) Tobias Gäbler
silver medal	(South Korea) Kim Kyung-min
bronze medal	(Finland) Tom Hahl

The men's singles event in bowling at the 2001 World Games took place from 22 to 23 August 2001 at the Utenayu Bowl in Yokote, Japan.

== Competition format ==
A total of 24 athletes entered the competition. Best ten athletes from preliminary round qualifies to the round-robin. In round-robin each player plays ten matches. For a win player gets 10 points and for a draw 5 points. Total pins and bonus points are counted as final result. From this stage the best three athletes advances to the finals.

== Results ==
=== Preliminary ===
Rank	Athlete	Nation	Result	Note
1	Andrés Gómez	Colombia	4008	Q
2	Petter Hansen	Norway	4007	Q
3	Tony Manna Jr.	United States	3919	Q
4	Kim Kyung-min	South Korea	3899	Q
5	Constantine Ko King	Philippines	3826	Q
6	José Lander	Venezuela	3757	Q
7	Steve Thornton	(United Kingdom) Great Britain	3724	Q
8	Masaaki Takemoto	Japan	3703	Q
9	Tom Hahl	Finland	3695	Q
10	Tobias Gäbler	Germany	3688	Q
11	François Sacco	France	3685	
12	George Lambert	Canada	3648	
12	Wu Siu Hong	Hong Kong	3648	
14	Diego Fernandez	Guatemala	3607	
15	Remy Ong	Singapore	3561	
16	Frank Russo	Guam	3541	
17	Tseng Sheng-hsien	Chinese Taipei	3535	
18	Kenny Ang	Malaysia	3493	
19	Ron van den Boogaard	Netherlands	3479	
20	Rolando Sebelen	Dominican Republic	3459	
21	Ronald Chamberlain	(United Kingdom) Great Britain	3364	
22	Nelson Toro	Puerto Rico	3361	
23	Raul Chang	Peru	3253	
24	Adriano Santi	San Marino	3164	

=== Semifinal ===
Rank	Athlete	Nation	Pins	Bonus	Result	Note
1	Kim Kyung-min	South Korea	2335	90	2425	Q
2	Tom Hahl	Finland	2158	55	2213	Q
3	Tobias Gäbler	Germany	2127	60	2187	Q
4	Steve Thornton	(United Kingdom) Great Britain	2139	45	2184	
5	Tony Manna Jr.	United States	2101	50	2151	
6	Masaaki Takemoto	Japan	2033	50	2083	
7	Petter Hansen	Norway	1999	50	2049	
8	José Lander	Venezuela	1977	30	2007	
9	Andrés Gómez	Colombia	1975	30	2005	
10	Constantine Ko King	Philippines	1957	40	1997	

=== Finals ===
Semifinal			Final
			1	(South Korea) Kim Kyung-min	386
3	(Germany) Tobias Gäbler	241	3	(Germany) Tobias Gäbler	447
2	(Finland) Tom Hahl	234
