= NSW TBA Masters (Tenpin Bowling) =

Annual Tenpin Bowling tournament

The New South Wales State Masters is an annual Tenpin Bowling tournament for adults in New South Wales, Australia

The tournament is open to men and women over age 18 who are members of Tenpin Bowling Australia (TBA Limited).

Started in 2001, the matches are held at bowling centres that are registered with the TBA.

== Description ==
Qualification for the men's and women's finals usually involve a three-game series rolled during the NSW State Championships. The top eight to 12 bowlers, along with the reigning champion, progress to the finals stage in the Masters.

Where there are low numbers in qualifications for any finals in any divisions, the highest qualifying scorer automatically becomes the NSW State Masters champion of that division. Masters Champions from each year are then given automatic qualification and free entry into the Australian Masters Tournament.

=== Past New South Wales Open Masters Champions ===
Location	Year	Men's Champion	Women's Champion	Australian Masters Venue
	2001	Craig Bourke	Ann-Maree Putney	Canberra International Bowl (Canberra)
AMF Bankstown	2002	Troy Maxwell	Sue Cassell	AMF Bankstown (Sydney)
	2003	Jamie Kyriacou	Sue Cassell	Kirwan Lanes (Townsville)
AMF Penrith	2004	Glen Anderson	Sue Cassell	AMF Forest Hill (Melbourne)
	2005	Neil Donnelly	Sue Cassell	Illawarra Strikezone (Albion Park)
Manattan Super Bowl Liverpool	2006	Ray Chan	Katie Stuart	AMF Moonah (Hobart)
Gosford City Bowl	2007	Neil Donnelly	Sue Cassell	Oz Tenpin Altona (Melbourne)
South Strathfield Super Bowl	2008	Neil Donnelly	Kara Triulcio	AMF Tuggeranong (Canberra)
AMF Villawood	2009	Stephen Cowland	Jen Jones	AMF Mt. Gravatt (Brisbane)
Gosford City Bowl	2010	Sam Cooley	Jen Jones	AMF Rooty Hill (Sydney)
Cambelltown City Bowl	2011	Christian Purdue	Julie Hird	AMF Rooty Hill (Sydney)
AMF Illawarra	2012	Glen Loader	Natalie Shelley	AMF Rooty Hill (Sydney)
AMF Illawarra	2013	Sam Cooley	N/A	Kirwan Lanes (Townsville)
Tenpin City Lidcombe	2014	Sam Cooley	Monique Rusin	Tenpin City Lidcombe (Sydney)
Tenpin City Lidcombe	2015	Sam Cooley	Marnie Britton	Tenpin City Lidcombe (Sydney)
Warners Bay SuperStrike	2016	Jayden Panella	Sarah Heath	Tenpin City Lidcombe (Sydney)
Tenpin City Lidcombe	2017	Ross Brown	Tegan Ihnativ	Wyncity Point Cook (Melbourne)
Campbelltown City Bowl	2018	Mitchell Brown	Bree MacPherson	Oz Tenpin Chirnside Park (Melbourne)
ZONE Bowling Rooty Hill RSL	2019	Tyson Carr	Alexia Hicks	ZONE Bowling Rooty Hill RSL (Sydney)

== Classic Masters History ==
Although the Junior counterpart of the Classic Masters has been running for years, an adult version had not been contested until 2010. Due to low numbers, it was not seen until its re-inception in 2016.

=== Eligibility ===
- TBA Registered Players who reached the age of 18 years as at 1 January of the current year
- Entering Average does not exceed 189 for women and 199 for men
- Participants who have completed an all-events entry in the NSW State Championships before the final

=== Information ===
- Scratch event with two divisions; Male and Female
- Top eight contestants in each division from qualifying, including the Defending Champion (if eligible) contest the Adult Classic Cup Final

=== Qualifying ===
- Qualifying can take place in singles and doubles events of the State Championships
- Bowlers may attempt to qualify more than once

=== Final ===
- Bowlers will contest eight games with a lane change after each game
- The top two males and females on scratch pinfall after the eight games will contest a two-game aggregate final with the bowler with the highest pinfall of this two-game match being declared the NSW Adult Classic Cup Champion

=== Past New South Wales Classic Masters Champions ===
Location	Year	Men's Champion	Women's Champion
Gosford City Bowl	2010	John Carroll	Carla Gallo
Warners Bay SuperStrike	2016	Richard Palma	Jessica Jones
Tenpin City Lidcombe	2017	Roger Cervantes	Tamika Spooner
Campbelltown City Bowl	2018	Chris Butler	Tamika Spooner
ZONE Bowling Rooty Hill RSL	2019	Cameron Phillips	Debbie Marks
