= Annette Hagre =

Swedish ten-pin bowler

Annette Hagre Johannesson, born 1951, is a Swedish ten-pin bowler.

Annette won the Bowling World Cup in Copenhagen, Denmark and the Fédération Internationale des Quilleurs (FIQ) World Masters title on the same year in 1987. The World Bowling Writers association named her 1987 Female bowler of the Year.

Some months before the World Cup tournament, Hagre had endured a long and difficult operation to remove a ganglion in her bowling wrist. She didn't begin practicing until about a month before Copenhagen, but still managed to lead the field at Rodovre Bowling Center every day but one, with a 200-plus average. Soon after her 1987 victories, Johannesson retired to concentrate on her family and her career.

Coming out of retirement in 1989, she won the 1989 FIQ Euro Zone Masters title. She was elected to the WBW International Bowling Hall of Fame in 1993.
