= Peter Ljung =

Peter Ljung may refer to:

- Peter Ljung (bowler), Swedish bowler
- Peter Ljung (speedway rider) (born 1982), Swedish motorcycle speedway rider
