= Khalifa International Bowling Centre =

Khalifa International Bowling Centre is the national bowling facility of the United Arab Emirates. The venue was opened in 1999 and was purpose built to host the 14th FIQ World Bowling Championships.

The facility has 40 tenpin bowling lanes with automatic Brunswick scoring systems. Additionally, there is a billiards room and a table tennis room. Three restaurants are within the building as well as two bowling shops and a small video arcade.

The venue is the only one to have ever hosted the World Bowling Championship on more than one occasion. This record was earned when the event returned in 2014 and 2015.

== Features ==
Khalifa International Bowling Centre has high ceilings and much natural light, contrary to a traditional bowling alley. There is a mezzanine level at the front of the building that includes a balcony.

Retractable gallery seating accommodates 616 guests. The capacity can expand to nearly 1,000 when chairs are added in front of the gallery.

Each lane is equipped with an automatic scoring system, automatic bumpers and a 42” monitor. Sports are shown on additional televisions above the lanes. There are also two screens, each measuring 4m x 3m, mounted above the lanes on either side of the facilities to display tournament scores in-house action.

The exterior features a bowling ball on the roof.

Three food and beverage outlets are located in the venue. This includes Noodle Bowl, an award-winning Chinese-type restaurant, Lucky Strike and Summer Breeze.
