= David O'Sullivan (bowler) =

American ten-pin bowler

David O'Sullivan (Orlando, Florida, US) is an American ten-pin bowler and was the 2007 U.S. Amateur champion. O'Sullivan earned the title at the 2007 USBC Team USA Trials in January, 2007, which also put him on Team USA for the first time. As a member of Team USA, he won medals in five of six events at the Men's American Zone Championships contested in Guatemala in May, 2007.

O'Sullivan made the quarterfinals of the 2007 World Ranking Masters, losing to eventual tournament winner Stuart Williams of England.

O'Sullivan has a career best ranking 3rd in the world in spades.

He also Bowled a very impressive 299 at the national bowling championships in Las Vegas in 2024. His 299 was one pin shy of the world record of 300.

He enjoys long walks on the beach and Tropical Smoothie Cafe. Dave is best friends with former Junior Team USA Member Matt Gasn.
