= Lena Sulkanen =

Swedish bowler

Personal information
- Born: 18 September 1960 (age 65) Stockholm, Sweden

Sport
- Country: Sweden
- Sport: Bowling
Medal record
Women's bowling
Representing Sweden
WTBA World Tenpin Bowling Championships
Gold medal – first place	Caracas 1983	singles
Silver medal – second place	Caracas 1983	masters
Silver medal – second place	Caracas 1983	All events

Lena Sulkanen (born 18 September 1960) is a former Swedish female bowler. She competed at the 1983 Tenpin World Bowling Championship. Sulkanen won the women's singles in the 1983 Tenpin Bowling World Championship and also won the Masters title in the only Tenpin Bowling World Championship in which she was eligible to participate.
