= Stuart Williams (ten-pin bowling) =

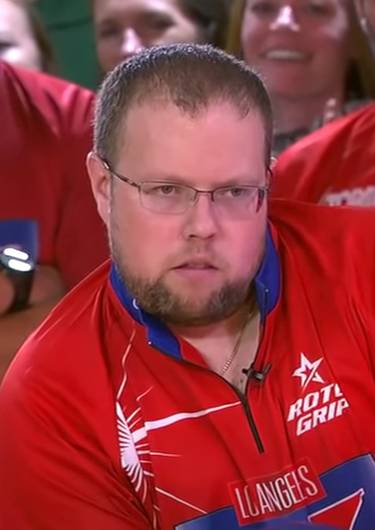
Williams playing as part of the Los Angeles X in 2019

Stuart Williams (born 28 June 1981 in Ellesmere Port) is an English professional ten-pin bowler who has won titles in nine countries. He is one of the most active touring players in the sport. He is known to his followers by the nickname "Beef Stu". While in England, Williams, along with store owner and father Dave, ran MCS Bowling, a pro shop at Chester Megabowl. Williams now resides in Pflugerville, Texas, USA. He is a member of the Roto Grip pro staff and is also sponsored by Turbo Grips inserts.

== Amateur career ==
Williams won England's Crown Green Bowls national junior championship at age 14. He has been a member of six Weber Cup championships with Team Europe.

== European Bowling Tour ==
Williams has 6 EBT titles to his name, including the City of Barcelona title in 2003 (his first ever European ranking event), the Brunswick Aalborg International in 2004, and the Ebonite Luxembourg Open in 2006.

Williams triumphed in the 2007 World Ranking Masters, defeating Peter Ljung from Sweden 2-1 (233-236, 235–224, 269–240) in the best of three final. Williams had qualified in third position, and also eliminated David O'Sullivan (U.S.) in the quarterfinals, and Thomas Gross (Austria) in the semifinals. He won the EBT Masters championship in 2016, defeating Sweden's Jesper Svensson in the final match.

== PBA Tour ==
On May 31, 2009, Williams earned an exemption for the U.S. PBA Tour by finishing 6th at the PBA Tour Trials in Allen Park, MI (USA). This made him the first bowler from the United Kingdom to compete full-time on the PBA Tour.

On November 18, 2011, Williams won his first PBA title in the Bayer Viper Open, part of that season's World Series of Bowling. In doing so, he became the first player from England to win a title on the standard PBA Tour in North America. After a drought of nearly seven years, he won the PBA Tulsa Open on October 20, 2018, for his second PBA Tour title.

Williams also has three PBA Regional Tour titles and has rolled ten 300 games in PBA events.

== Personal ==
Williams is married to Tina Stickney, who was a collegiate bowler at Texas A&M University. The couple has one child, son Brady (b. 2016). Stuart states his favorite sport is cricket, while his favorite U.S. sport is American football (favorite team: New England Patriots).
