= International Bowling Museum and Hall of Fame =

Museum in Arlington, Texas, U.S.

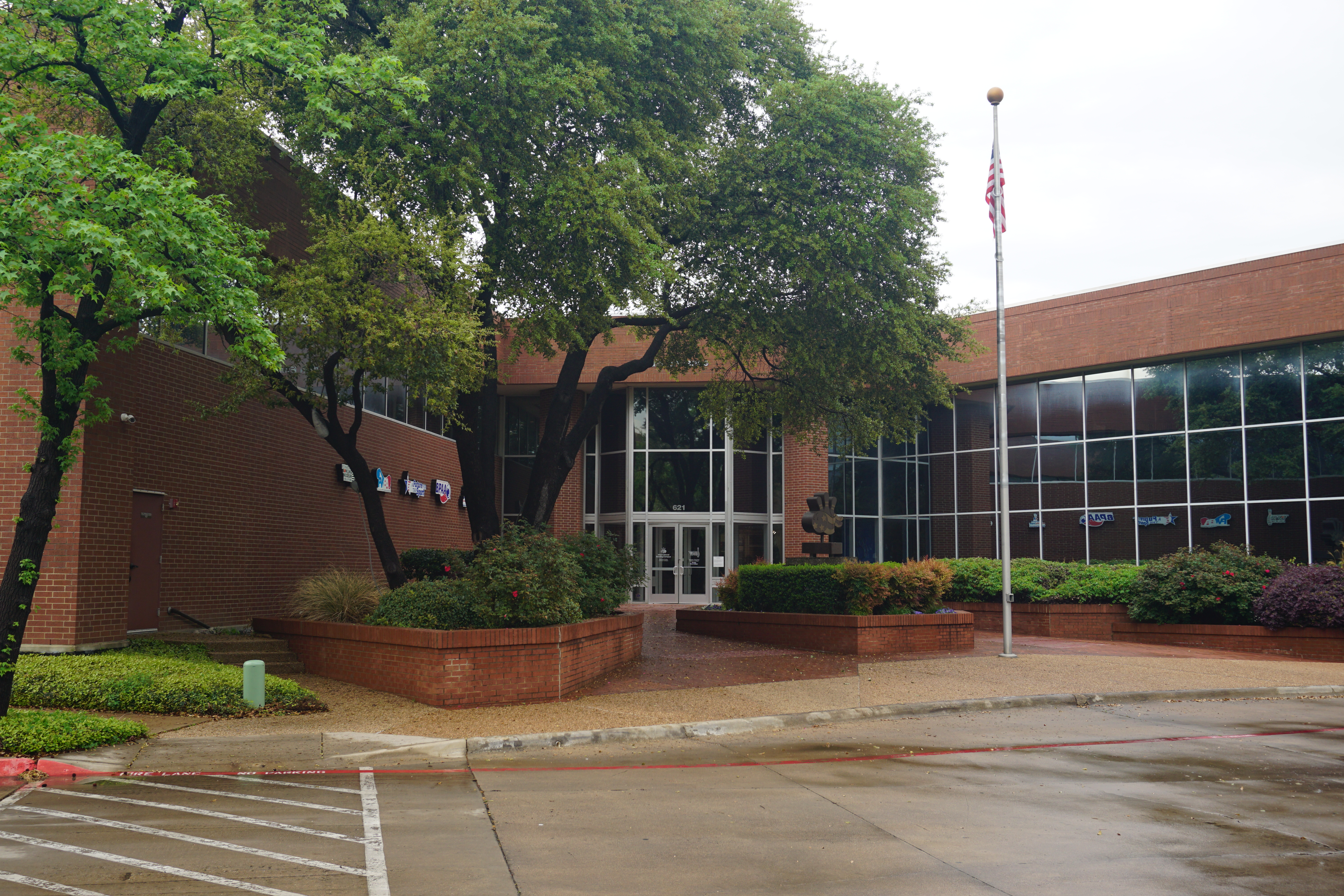
- International Bowling Museum and Hall of Fame in Arlington, Texas
- Established: January 26, 2010
- Location: Arlington, Texas
- Coordinates: 32°45′7″N 97°4′8″W
- Type: Sports museum
- Website: www.bowlingmuseum.com

The International Bowling Museum is a sports museum located inside the International Bowling Campus in Arlington, Texas. It opened on January 26, 2010, after previously being located in St. Louis, Missouri. The design and fabrication of the new facility was awarded to Museum Arts Inc., a Dallas company. There is also an IBM satellite campus located in Reno, Nevada at the National Bowling Stadium.

The World Bowling Writers (WBW) International Bowling Hall of Fame and United States Bowling Congress Hall of Fame are at this location, along with many exhibits.

== Overview ==
The museum features an extensive collection of bowling artifacts, interactive exhibits, and detailed information regarding bowling history. The exhibit contains vintage footage and information regarding famous former bowlers such as Don Carter and Carolyn Ballard. The facility also features a miniature bowling alley and a bowling equipment shop. The museum has a large archival collection on bowling materials that can be accessed by users or museum archivers, both for a fee. The International Bowling Hall of Fame is also located within the museum, and details all Hall of Famers inducted into the professional bowling Halls of Fame of USBC, BPAA, PBA, PWBA, IBMA.

== Hall of Fame ==
The International Bowling Museum is also home of the International Bowling Hall of Fame. The Hall of Fame is home to all Hall of Fame inductees of the United States Bowling Congress (USBC), the Bowling Proprietors' Association of America (BPAA), the Professional Bowlers Association (PBA), Professional Women's Bowling Association (PWBA), and the International Bowling Media Association (IBMA).

== See also ==
- List of museums in North Texas
- United States Bowling Congress
