= National Bowling Stadium =

Stadium in Reno, Nevada, US

- Taj Mahal of Tenpins; Pin Palace
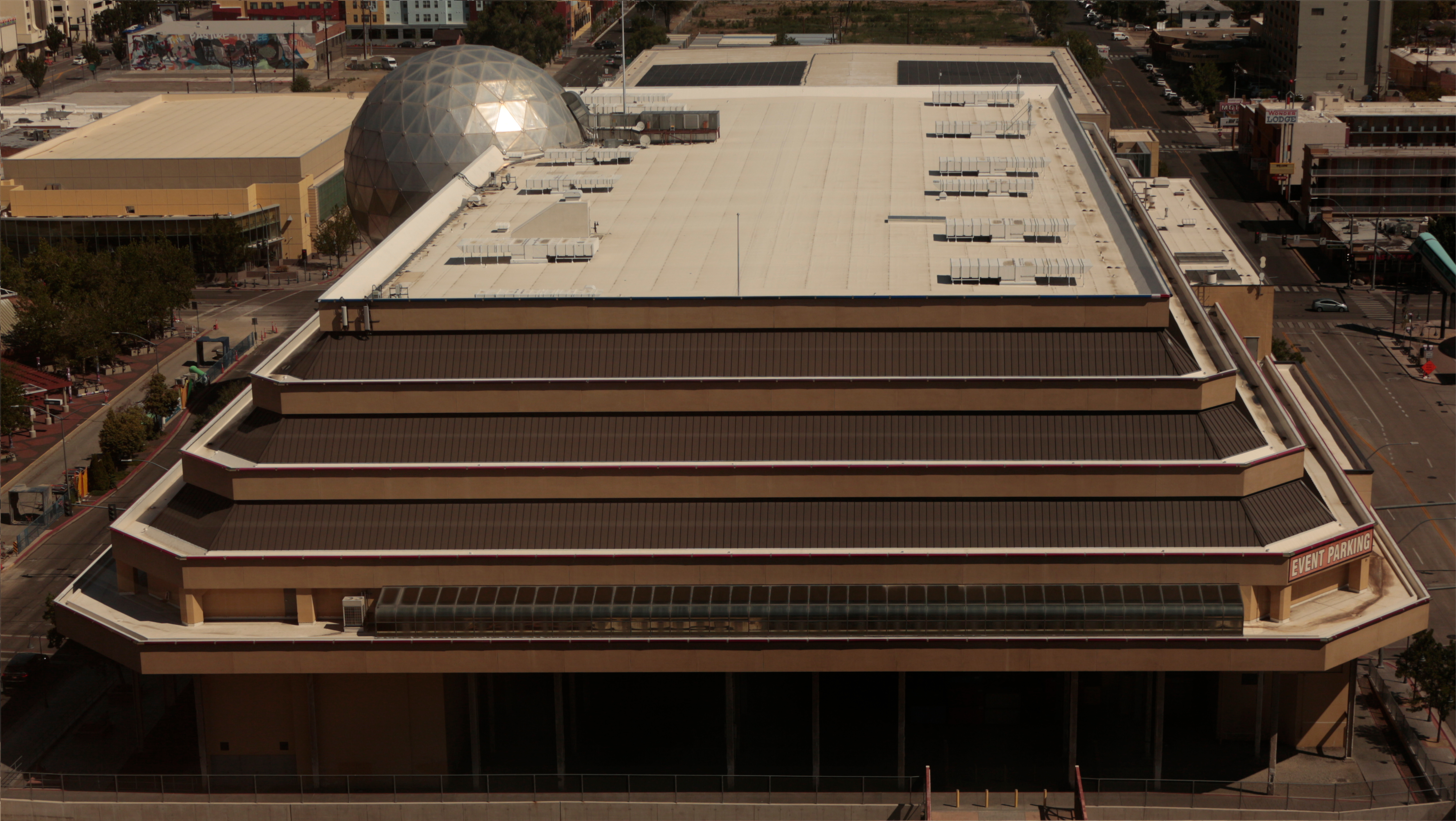
- Seen from the south in 2021.

- Location in Nevada Location in the United States Location in North America
- Interactive map of National Bowling Stadium
- Address: 300 University Way
- Location: Reno, Nevada, U.S.
- Coordinates: 39°31′46.33″N 119°48′43.4″W
- Owner: Reno-Sparks Convention and Visitors Authority
- Capacity: 1,100 spectators
- Field size: 78 lanes 38,000 square feet in Reno, Nevada

Construction
- Groundbreaking: 1992; 34 years ago
- Opened: February 3, 1995; 31 years ago
- Renovated: 2007 and 2019
- Cost: $47.5 million
- Architect: Peter B. Wilday

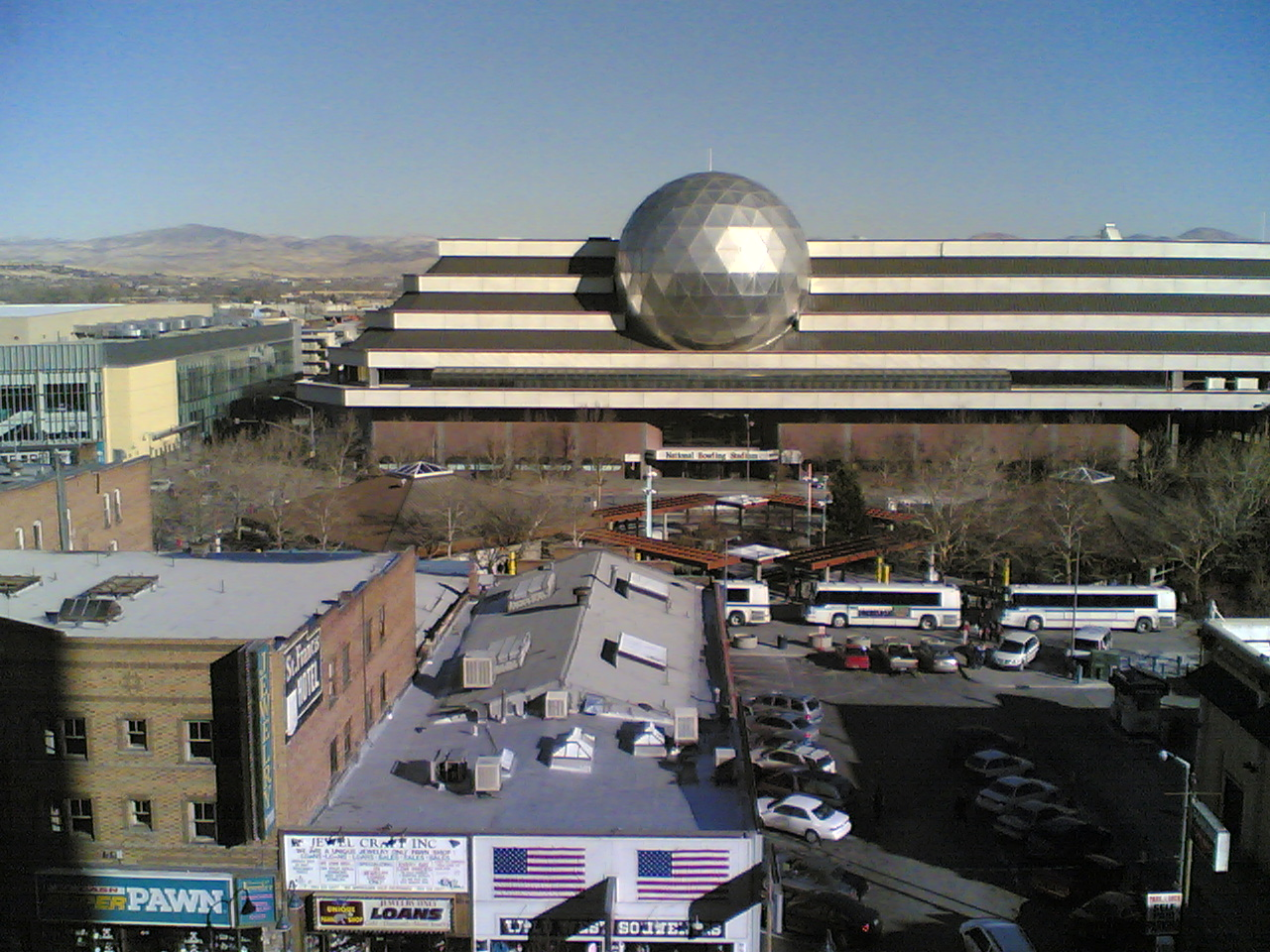
The front entrance of the building.

The National Bowling Stadium is a 363,000-square-foot (33,700 m^{2}) ten-pin bowling stadium in Reno, Nevada. The stadium is recognizable for an 80 feet (24 m) aluminum geodesic dome in its facade, built to resemble a large bowling ball.

Nicknamed the "Taj Mahal of tenpins", the 78-lane stadium opened on February 3, 1995, cost $47.5 million and took three years to build. It is often the filming location for bowling scenes in films.

== Construction and financing ==
The stadium was constructed as part of a renovation effort of downtown Reno, which also saw the construction of the Silver Legacy Resort & Casino, The concept for construction of the stadium was in part to capture tourism dollars being sent to Las Vegas and as part of an agreement with the American Bowling Congress that upon construction of a first-class permanent facility, they would ensure their return to Reno every third year. The project was funded by a room tax lobbied by the City of Reno to the Nevada Legislature based on commitments from the American Bowling Congress and the Women's International Bowling Congress, which itself merged with the ABC to form the United States Bowling Congress (USBC) in 2005.

The original construction of the stadium had 80 lanes, but since an architectural error resulted in the stadium not having a center aisle for bowlers to march out for the team event, the center lanes had to be converted to an aisle. Despite the conversion to a 78-lane facility, the main pro shop/gift shop is still called Lane 81.

== Features ==
The stadium can be covered to be converted to convention space. It utilizes fully automatic scoring on what (upon construction) was the world's longest rigid, backlight video screen, with oversight from a computerized command center on the stadium's fifth level. When it opened in 1995, it was just in time to welcome 100,000 members of the American Bowling Congress for their 100th anniversary meeting. In 2009, the National Bowling Stadium broke the record for most United States Bowling Congress championships hosted, surpassing the tie between Buffalo and Toledo.

The stadium also hosts an extension of the International Bowling Museum and Hall of Fame (IBM/HF) which is located in Arlington, Texas. The museum displays hall-of-fame portraits as well as artifacts collected and preserved by the IBM/HF.

The stadium also houses the Light Circus Nevada Neon Museum, which opened to the public on October 30, 2026. Its initial display comprised nearly 50 historic neon signs and artworks from Nevada, including signs from the Mapes Hotel, Nevada Club and Harolds Club.

== Film history ==
The National Bowling Stadium has been the filming location for several feature films. In addition to being the location of the grand finale between Bill Murray and Woody Harrelson's characters in the 1996 bowling film Kingpin, the stadium was also a setting in the Michael J. Fox/Kirk Douglas film Greedy. The National Bowling Stadium appears in the last two episodes of the TV series Knuckles.
