= European Tenpin Bowling Federation =

International sports governing body

- Abbreviation: ETBF

Official website
- europeanbowling.sport

The European Tenpin Bowling Federation (ETBF) is a ten-pin bowling organisation that hosts the worldwide European Bowling Tour (EBT), similar to that of the tour held by the Professional Bowlers Association (PBA). The EBT is one of three tours (Europe, Americas, Asia) that form part of the ranking system of the World Tenpin Bowling Association (WTBA), with the top 8 bowlers each year invited to the World Ranking Masters. The tour is run by the European Tenpin Bowling Federation. The ETBF is a subsection, or "European Zone", of the WTBA under the Fédération Internationale des Quilleurs.
