= Carol Gianotti =

Australian ten-pin bowler

Personal information
- Born: Perth, Western Australia
- Years active: 1989-2000

Sport
- Country: Australia
- Sport: Bowling
- Turned pro: 1989
- Retired: 2000

Achievements and titles
- National finals: 16 PWBA Titles (2 majors) in the United States of America
Medal record
Representing Australia
Women's Bowling
World Tenpin Bowling Championships
Bronze medal – third place	1987 Helsinki	Masters
Bronze medal – third place	2013 Nevada	Doubles
Women's Bowling World Championships
Silver medal – second place	2009 Henderson	Doubles
Asian Youth Tenpin Bowling Championship
Gold medal – first place	1985 Jakarta	Doubles
Silver medal – second place	1985 Jakarta	Trios
Silver medal – second place	1985 Jakarta	All Events
Silver medal – second place	1985 Jakarta	Masters

Carol Gianotti of Perth is a female Australian ten-pin bowler. She was inducted into the Professional Women's Bowling Association (PWBA) Hall of Fame in 2020, the Tenpin Bowling Australia Hall of Fame in 2016 and the United States Bowling Congress (USBC) Hall of Fame in 2011. She won 16 professional women's bowling titles (tied for 13th all-time) between 1989 and 2000. She inspired other Australians and women abroad to join the professional tour.

Gianotti was the first Australian woman to be inducted into the USBC and PWBA Halls of Fame in the United States.

On her debut as a youth bowler, Gianotti earned one gold and three silver medals at the Asian Youth Championships in 1985 held in Jakarta, Indonesia. Representing Australia at the 1988 Seoul Olympic Games was a career milestone leading up to the PWBA. She competed for Australia in the 1988 Seoul Olympic Games when bowling was introduced as a demonstration sport.

Gianotti debuted in the PWBA in 1989 at the age of 21, and was an instant success after winning her maiden championship at the WIBC Queens major in her first appearance on tour. She would win a second PWBA title later in the year on her way to PWBA Rookie of the Year honors. After a two-year title drought in 1990 and 1991, she rebounded with a career-best four titles in the 1992 season. In 1998, she won two titles and led the PWBA in earnings and average to earn her first and only PWBA Player of the Year award.

Gianotti also competed at the 2009 World Tenpin Bowling Association World Women's Championships in Las Vegas, Nevada and 13th World Women’s Championship at Cashman Center, Las Vegas and won the silver and bronze medal in doubles with Ann-Maree Putney.

== PWBA Tour titles ==
Major championships are in bold text. (Source: 11thframe.com)

1. **1989 WIBC Queens** (Bismarck, ND)
2. 1989 Brunswick Open (Hammond, IN)
3. 1992 New Orleans Classic (New Orleans, LA)
4. 1992 Columbia 300 Delaware Open (Claymont, DE)
5. 1992 Hammer Midwest Open (Rockford, IL)
6. 1992 Ebonite Fall Classic (Denver, CO)
7. 1994 Hammer Eastern Open (Baltimore, MD)
8. 1996 Baltimore Eastern Open (Baltimore, MD)
9. **1996 Sam’s Town Invitational** (Las Vegas, NV)
10. 1997 Brunswick Long Island Open (Lake Grove, NY)
11. 1997 Track Triton Open (Rossford, OH)
12. 1997 Merit Mixed Doubles Championship w/Tim Criss (Las Vegas, NV)
13. 1998 Columbia 300 Delaware Open (New Castle, DE)
14. 1998 Storm Three Rivers Open (Pittsburgh, PA)
15. 2000 Clabber Girl Greater Terre Haute Open (Terre Haute, IN)
16. 2000 Columbia 300 Open (Lancaster, OH)

== Personal life ==
Gianotti was born and reared in Perth, Western Australia. Her mother Jan, as well as her father Bruno, both represented Australia and Western Australia, while her siblings Robyn and Mark likewise had successful bowling careers. After AMF Morley was erected next door to her family's house in 1977, Gianotti began her career in the sport at the age of ten.
