= Tom Hahl =

Finnish ten-pin bowler

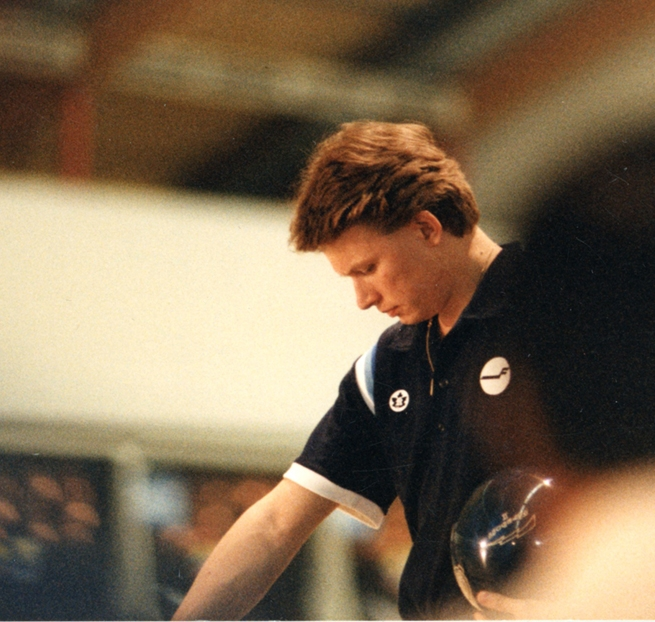
Tom Hahl

Tom Hahl (born October 6, 1965 in Hämeenlinna) is a Finnish ten-pin bowler who has won bowling titles in 16 different countries worldwide in his international career.

== Career ==
He made Finnish National Team for the first time at age of 18.1987 FIQ World Championships he won individual Bronze medal in the Masters, All-Events and a Silver medal in Trios and Five man teams. 1990 he won the prestigious AMF World Cup in Pattaya Thailand. 2002 he participated in the World Games in Akita, Japan, by finishing third. Tom Hahl has 21 career 300 perfect games. Hahl is a member of Finnish bowling Hall of Fame. Hahl has been living and representing Singapore since 1994.

== Medals in Championships ==
=== National Championships ===
1983 Finnish Youth Championships Silver

1985 Finnish Youth Championships Gold

1986 Finnish Championships Silver

1987 Finnish Championships Gold in Doubles

1988 Finnish Championships Silver in Teams

1989 Finnish Championships Gold

1990 Finnish Championships Bronze

1990 Finnish Championships Bronze in Teams

1991 Finnish Championships Silver

1991 Finnish Championships Gold in Doubles

1995 Finnish Championships Bronze in Teams

=== International Championships ===
1982 European Youth Championships Silver in Teams

1982 Scandinavian Cup Gold

1983 Nordic Youth Silver in Doubles

1983 Nordic Youth Championships Bronze in Teams

1984 European Youth Championships Silver in Teams

1984 European Youth Championships Silver in Trios

1984 European Team Cup Gold

1984 Nordic Championships Bronze in Trios

1986 European Team Cup Gold

1986 Nordic Championships Silver in Doubles

1986 Nordic Championships Bronze in Trios

1986 Nordic Championships Silver in Teams

1987 World Championships Bronze in All Events

1987 World Championships Bronze in Masters

1987 World Championships Silver in Teams

1987 World Championships Silver in Trios

1990 European Cup Silver

1990 Bowling World Cup Gold

1992 European team Cup Gold

1994 World team Cup Bronze

2001 World Games Bronze
