= World Tenpin Bowling Association =

- Abbreviation: World Bowling or WTBA
- Inaugurated: 1952
- President: Sheikh Talal Mohammed Al-Sabah
- Headquarters: Helsinki, Finland
- Website: World Bowling

The World Tenpin Bowling Association is the world governing body of ten-pin bowling, and one of the two sections of the International Bowling Federation. They promulgate and enforce playing rules and equipment specifications, conduct world championships, oversee zone championships, and grant approval for other international tournaments.

The WTBA manages the World Bowling Tour.

== History ==
International bowling began during the 1930s under the International Bowling Federation. The attempt to unite all the bowlers in the world created Fédération Internationale des Quillers (FIQ) in 1952; the body renamed itself World Bowling in 2014.

== Worldwide Zones ==
It is divided into the following geographical Zones:

- American Zone – Pan American Bowling Confederation which consists of North and South America
- Asian zone – Asian Bowling Federation which consists of Asia
- European Tenpin Bowling Federation which consists of Europe and Africa and governs the European Bowling Tour (similar to that of the Professional Bowlers Association's Tour)
- African Zone – Bowling Federation of Africa
- Oceania Zone – Oceania Bowling Federation which consists of Australia, Western Pacific

National organizations qualify to become WB member federations based on certain admission criteria. Currently, WB has 123 members. In some cases, the member represents only the Tenpin discipline or the Ninepin discipline. In other cases the member represents both disciplines.

The WB Presidium (similar to an Executive Committee) is responsible for legislative matters, membership fees, fiscal plans and general administration of WB programs. It also has authority to hear and determine disputes between WB members or between WB members and WTBA.
