= Peter Ljung (bowler) =

Swedish bowling player (born 1977)

Peter Ljung (born 1977) is a Swedish bowling player. He won the AMF World Cup in Copenhagen, Denmark in 1986 when he was 19 years old.

Ljung participated in the 2007 World Ranking Masters and qualified in 7th position after the 24 game qualifier. Ljung eliminated both World Tenpin Masters finalists, Jason Belmonte (Australia) and Paul Moor, (England) on his way to the final, but had to settle for the runner-up position, after defeat by Stuart Williams, 2-1 (233-236, 235-224, 269-240).
