= Diandra Asbaty =

American ten-pin bowler

Personal information
- Born: August 2, 1980 (age 45) Oak Lawn, Illinois, U.S.
- Education: University of Nebraska–Lincoln
- Years active: 1999-Present
Medal record
Women's Ten-pin Bowling
Representing United States
Event	1st	2nd	3rd
World Bowling Championships	1	2	1
World Tenpin Team Cup	1	1	1
Tournament of the Americas	12	1	1
American Zone Youth Championships	2	–	–
Junior World Championships	1	2	1
Junior World Team Challenge	1	–	–
Total	18	6	4
World Tenpin Bowling Championships
Gold medal – first place	2007 Monterrey	Masters
Gold medal – first place	2003 Kuala Lumpur	Masters
Silver medal – second place	2003 Kuala Lumpur	Doubles
Silver medal – second place	2003 Kuala Lumpur	Silver
Bronze medal – third place	2003 Kuala Lumpur	Trios
Bronze medal – third place	1999 Abu Dhabi	Trios
AMF Bowling World Cup
Winner	2006 Caracas	Champion
International Titles
Winner	2007 World Ranking Masters	Champion
Winner	2004 World Ranking Masters	Champion
Winner	2002 Australian Masters	Champion
	2002 British Open	4th
	2002 World Ranking Masters	4th
Professional Titles
Winner	2012 USBC Queens	Champion
Winner	2007 Professional Bowlers Association	
- (PBA) Tour Women's Series
	Great Lakes Classic	Champion
Winner	2010 PBA Don and Paula Carter	
Winner	Mixed Doubles tournament	Champion
Winner	2022 Storm Striking Against Breast Cancer	
Winner	Mixed Doubles tournament	Champion

Diandra Hyman Asbaty (born August 2, 1980 in Oak Lawn, Illinois) is an American bowler who represented Team USA for fifteen years and was United States Amateur Champion in 1999 and 2006. She is also an official youth bowling spokesperson for the United States Bowling Congress (USBC). She competed in the PBA Women's Series from 2007 to 2010, winning two titles in that span. She also won the 2012 USBC Queens major tournament and continues to compete in PWBA tournaments. Asbaty has been elected to the USBC Hall of Fame.

Asbaty is a pro staff member for Storm Bowling.

== Personal ==
Asbaty started bowling at age 5 with her older sister, Kassy. Kassy Hyman would go on to bowl for Wichita State University. Diandra graduated from the University of Nebraska–Lincoln with a bachelor's degree in journalism. She lives in Chicago, Illinois, with her husband, John, son Madden and daughter Jersey.

== Bowling career ==
Diandra owns two PBA Women’s Series titles, one in singles (2007) and one in mixed doubles (2010). The latter event accounted for the 25th and final PBA Tour title for Asbaty's partner, PBA Hall of Famer Brian Voss.

Diandra owns two PWBA Tour titles. She won the 2012 USBC Queens major championship and the 2022 Striking Against Breast Cancer Mixed Doubles (with partner E. J. Tackett).

She has also earned over 60 international medals.

In November 2022, Asbaty was elected to the USBC Hall of Fame, Performance category. She was officially inducted on April 26, 2023.

== Accomplishments ==
=== International ===
- 2012 Australian Masters champion
- Bowling World Cup champion 2006 AMF World Cup
- 2004 and 2007 World Ranking Masters champion
- Silver medal at 2004 WTBA World Tenpin Team Cup
- Gold, bronze and two silver medals at 2003 FIQ World Championships
- Bronze medal at 2003 FIQ World Tenpin Team Cup
- Four gold medals and one bronze at 2002 Tournament of the Americas
- 4th at 2002 British Open
- 4th at 2002 World Ranking Masters
- Four gold medals and one silver at 2001 Tournament of the Americas
- 2001 Junior World Team Challenge champion
- Gold medal at 2000 FIQ World Tenpin Team Cup
- One gold medal, two silver and one bronze at 2000 Junior World Championships
- Four gold medals at 1999 Tournament of the Americas
- Two gold medals at 1997 FIQ American Zone Youth Championships

=== National ===
- Winner at 2012 USBC Queens
- 7th at 2005 USA Bowling National Amateur Championships
- 10th at 2004 USA Bowling National Amateur Championships
- 8th at 2003 USA Bowling National Amateur Championships
- 5th at 2001 USA Bowling National Amateur Championships
- 7th at 2000 USA Bowling National Amateur Championships
- 1999 and 2006 U.S. Amateur champion
- 7th at 1998 USA Bowling National Amateur Championships
- 2nd at 2000 USA Junior Gold Bowling National Championships
- 6th at 2001 USA Junior Gold Bowling National Championships
- Member of 1999 and 2001 Intercollegiate Bowling Championships winner (Nebraska)

=== State/Local ===
1998 Indiana Junior Queens champion (Muncie, Indiana)

1998 Indiana State Female Youth Bowler of the Year

=== Professional ===
- Champion at 2007 PBA Women's Series Great Lakes Classic
- Champion at 2010 PBA Don and Paula Carter Mixed Doubles (with Brian Voss)
- Champion at 2012 USBC Queens
- Champion at 2022 Storm Striking Against Breast Cancer Mixed Doubles (with E. J. Tackett)

== Awards ==
- Bowlers Journal 1st Team All-American, 2010
- World Bowling Writers Bowler of the Year, 2007
- Bowlers Journal Bowler of the Year, 2007
- Bowling Writers Amateur Bowler of the Year, 2003, 2006, 2007
- Bowlers Journal Bowler of the Year, 2006
- World Bowling Writers World Bowler of the Year, 2006
- Inducted into the World Bowling Writer’s Hall of Fame, 2005
- Mid-America Bowler of the Year, 1999, 2000, 2001, 2003, 2005
- Bowlers Journal International 1st Team All American, 2005
- Bowlers Journal International Amateur Bowler of the Year, 2000, 2001, 2003
- United States Olympic Committee “Athlete of the Year”- Bowling, 2003
- United States Olympic Committee Nominee “Sportswoman of the Year,” 2003
- University of Nebraska Student Athlete of the Year, 2002
- United States Olympic Committee “Athlete of the Year”- Bowling, 2000
- National Collegiate Bowling Coaches Association - Player of the Year, 2000
- National Collegiate Bowling Coaches Association - First Team All- American, 2000
- Bowling Digest Magazine Collegiate Bowler of the Year, 2000
- Alberta E. Crowe Star of Tomorrow, 1998

== In the media ==
Diandra was the laneside reporter for ESPN's broadcasts of the PBA Team Challenge in July 2008.
