= Lynda Barnes =

American ten-pin bowler

Personal information
- Born: October 7, 1967 (age 58) Double Oak, Texas, United States

Sport
- Sport: Tenpin bowling
Medal record
Representing United States
Pan American Games
Gold medal – first place	1991 Havana	Women's team

Lynda Barnes (née Norry, born October 7, 1967) is one of the world's leading female tenpin bowlers. She is a former member of the PWBA (Professional Women's Bowling Association). Bowling as an amateur, Lynda won the 1998 USBC Queens championship, then known as the WIBC Queens. In 1999, Lynda married Chris Barnes, a leading bowler on the Professional Bowlers Association (PBA) tour. The couple's twin sons, Troy and Ryan, were born on May 16, 2002. Lynda is a former member of Team USA.

In 2005, along with Paul Moor of England, she was named the 2005 World Bowling Writers Bowler of the Year.

Lynda appears briefly in the 2006 documentary A League of Ordinary Gentlemen, as her husband was one of four PBA bowlers highlighted in the film.

In August 2006, Lynda competed in the USBC Women's Challenge tournament held at a mall in Las Vegas. The made-for-TV event was later shown on ESPN in a weekly format throughout September and October. She also qualified 7th in the 2007 U.S. Women's Open and fought her way through match play to make the four-person televised finals. She lost her semifinal match to finish in a tie for third place.

On April 30, 2008, Barnes won her second career USBC Queens title in an event televised by ESPN2. Entering the finals as the top seed from qualifying, she defeated Amy Stolz, 215-195, to earn a PWBA major title and the $30,000 first-place prize.

Less than two weeks later, on May 11, Barnes defeated four-time PBA titlist Sean Rash 258-237 in the finals of the first USBC "Bowling's Clash of the Champions." Barnes cashed $50,000 in this made-for-television event, broadcast nationally in the USA by CBS. The following year, she participated in the second and final USBC "Bowling's Clash of the Champions." Although she was eliminated in the first stage, her husband defeated Rebekah Diers in the championship match by a 257-207 victory. Both she and Chris are the only players to win the USBC Clash of Champions.

Barnes made her second U.S. Women's Open televised finals appearance in 2012, but she lost her opening match to finish in fifth place.

Kelly Kulick and Liz Johnson followed Barnes and Zulkifli when they both defeated a man during a televised championship match in bowling. Kulick and Johnson, however, have both won PBA Tour titles. Kulick won the 2010 PBA Tournament of Champions and Johnson won the PBA Chameleon Championship during the 2017 PBA World Series of Bowling.

== Lynda's Bio ==
Height: 1.63 m (5 feet, 4 inches)

Right/left-handed: Right

Highest certified game: 300 (6)

Highest certified series: 806

- Team USA Appearances: 1989, 1990, 1991, 1992, 1996, 1997, 1998, 2005, 2006, 2007*
- Barnes was granted an exemption for the 2007 team by the National Selection Committee following the 2006 USBC Team USA Championships

=== Family ===
Lynda and Chris have twin sons, Troy and Ryan, born in 2002. Ryan previously bowled for his father's alma mater, Wichita State University. In his senior year (2024), Ryan Barnes received a commissioner's exemption to compete in the PBA Players Championship, held in 2024 at Bowlero Northrock in Wichita, Kansas. He made the televised finals as the #4 seed, and finished in third place. Upon the conclusion of his collegiate career, Ryan joined the PBA.

== Career highlights ==
International:

- 2005 Qubica AMF World Cup champion
- Two silver medals (team and all-events) and two bronze (Masters and doubles) at 2005 Women's World Championships
- Three gold medals (team, all-events and doubles), one silver (singles) and one bronze (Masters) at 2005 American Zone Championships
- 1998 WIBC Queens champion
- Two gold medals (team, Masters) and one bronze (trios) at 1997 American Zone Championships
- 1997 British Open champion
- Gold medal at 1997 United Arab Emirates Invitational
- Gold medal at 1997 Africa Cup
- 5th at 1997 South African Open
- 7th at 1996 AMF World Cup
- Silver medal at 1996 World Tenpin Team Cup
- Five gold medals (singles, doubles, team, all-events, national all-events) at 1996 Tournament of the Americas
- Two gold medals and one silver at 1989 World Youth Championships
- Gold (team), silver (Masters) and two bronze medals (doubles, trios) at 1989 American Zone Championships
- Gold medal (team) at 1991 Pan American Games
- Silver (singles) and bronze medal (trios) at 1991 World Championships

National:

- 3rd at 2011 U.S. Women's Open
- 5th at 2010 U.S. Women's Open
- 1st at 2008 Bowling's Clash of the Champions presented by USBC
- 1st at 2008 USBC Queens
- Semi-finalist at the 2007 U.S. Women's Open
- 1995, 2005 and 2007 U.S. Amateur champion
- 4th at 2006 USBC Team USA Championships
- 1998 and 2004 WIBC Tournament Doubles champion (set record score in 2004 with Carolyn Dorin-Ballard)
- 1st at 1998 USBC Queens
- 1997 LPBT Fort Worth Regional Mixed Doubles champion
- 4th at 1997 USA Bowling National Amateur Championships
- 3rd at 1996 USA Bowling National Amateur Championships
- 5th at 1991 WIBC Queens
- 4th at 1991 USA Bowling National Amateur Championships
- 2nd at 1990 USA Bowling National Amateur Championships
- 4th at 1989 USA Bowling National Amateur Championships
- 1989 Association of College Unions International champion
- 5th at 1988 USA Bowling National Amateur Championships

Awards:

- 2016 BPAA Dick Weber Bowling Ambassador Award
- 2006 World Bowling Writers International Bowling Hall of Fame
- 2005 World Bowling Writers Female Bowler of the Year
- 2004-05 Bowlers Journal All-America first team
- 2004 WIBC All-American second team
- 1998 USOC Bowler of the Year
- 1998 Bowlers Journal Amateur Bowler of the Year
- 1997 Bowling Writers Association of America Amateur Bowler of the Year
- 1997 WIBC All-American team (first amateur to be selected in history)
- 1996 Bowlers Journal Amateur All-American team
- 1991 Bowling Writers Association of America Bowler of the Year
- 1990 California Star of Tomorrow
- 1989 WIBC Alberta E. Crowe Star of Tomorrow
- 1989 National Collegiate Bowling Championships All-Tournament team (San Jose State)
- 1989 World Youth Championships Sportsmanship Award
- 1989-90 National Collegiate Bowling Coaches Association Most Valuable Player
- 1988-89 and 1989-90 Bowling Writers Association of American Collegiate Bowler of the Year
- 1988-89 and 1989-90 National Collegiate Bowling Coaches Association All-American first team
- 1986-87 and 1987-88 National Collegiate Bowling Coaches Association Collegiate All-American second team
- Diablo Women's Bowling Association Hall of Fame
- 14-time member of Northern California All-Star team
