= Josefin Hermansson =

Swedish elite bowler (born 1990)

- Born: 1990 (age 35–36)
- Occupation: Bowler

Josefin Hermansson (born 1990) is a Swedish elite bowler.

Hermansson grew up in Borlänge, Sweden. As the daughter of two bowlers, she was introduced to bowling at the age of seven and joined the local bowling club BK Kullan. Later in her career, she represented clubs such as Team Granen Dam (formerly known as Team Vasa BK) and Sundbybergs IK. In 2013, however, she was looking for an opportunity to advance both her bowling and academic career. With this in mind, she moved to Gothenburg to join Team X-Calibur BK and to enroll at University of Gothenburg majoring in Japanese. Since completing her bachelor's degree in Japanese in 2017 (including an exchange year at Tokyo Gakugei University), she has focused solely on bowling.

Hermansson has had many successes. She won a bronze medal in the Junior European Championships in 2008 and an individual gold medal in the Swedish Championships in 2014. Apart from these medals, she has also, together with Team X-Calibur, won the Swedish national championships three times in the category team of eight (year 2014, 2015 and 2018). In spring 2019, she joined the ladies' senior national team. Later that year, she accompanied the Swedish national team to compete in the World Bowling Championships for Women in Las Vegas, and returned home with a silver medal in the category team of five and a gold medal in doubles (partner Jenny Wegner). The gold medal in doubles also got the duo nominated for the Swedish Radio's prize Radiosportens Jerringpris 2019, a Swedish national award honouring the best sport performance of the year.
