= Philippe Dubois =

Belgian chemist (born 1965)

- Dubois in 2022
- Born: 23 June 1965 (age 61); Charleroi, Belgium
- Education: Facultés universitaires Notre-Dame de la Paix (licence in chemistry, 1987); University of Liège (PhD, 1991)
- Known for: Bio-based and biodegradable polymers Polymer nanocomposites Ring-opening polymerization of lactones and lactides Reactive extrusion of polylactic acid
- Awards: GFP Grand Prix (2013); FNRS Quinquennial Prize (2015); Commander of the Order of Leopold (2017); BEPS Lifetime Achievement Award (2018); Honorary doctorate, University of Montpellier (2024)
- Scientific career
- Fields: Polymer chemistry, materials science
- Workplaces: University of Mons; Materia Nova
- Thesis: Molecular Engineering of Biocompatible and Biodegradable Materials through Ring-Opening of Lactones and Lactides (1991)
- Website: www.philippedubois.be

Philippe Dubois (born 23 June 1965) is a Belgian chemist who works on polymer and composite materials, in particular plastics made from renewable raw materials. He is a full professor at the University of Mons (UMONS), where he was rector from 2018 to 2026. He has been a member of the Class of Sciences of the Royal Academy of Science, Letters and Fine Arts of Belgium since 2010. He received the Quinquennial Prize of the National Fund for Scientific Research (FNRS) in 2015.

== Early life and education ==
Dubois was born in Charleroi. His father was a miner at the Roton colliery in Farciennes and his mother a homemaker. He has said that without a university close to home his parents could not have paid for his studies, and that this shapes his view of higher education. He studied chemistry at the Facultés universitaires Notre-Dame de la Paix in Namur, now the Université de Namur, and graduated in 1987 with a master's degree in organic chemistry. He then moved to the University of Liège, where he obtained a doctorate in science in 1991. His thesis, Molecular Engineering of Biocompatible and Biodegradable Materials through Ring-Opening of Lactones and Lactides, was passed with honours and led to his first patent, filed in 1989.

== Career ==
=== Research posts and University of Mons ===
After his doctorate Dubois did an industrial postdoctoral period with Dow in the Netherlands. He then held research posts of the FNRS at the University of Liège, first as research associate and later as senior research associate. In 1994 he spent a second postdoctoral period in chemical engineering at Michigan State University, working on bio-based polymer materials.

In 1997 he moved to the University of Mons-Hainaut, which merged into the University of Mons in 2009. There he founded the Service des Matériaux Polymères et Composites (SMPC), a polymer and composite materials group associated with the Materia Nova centre of excellence. He became professor in 1999 and full professor in 2003. He was vice-dean of the Faculty of Science from 2002 to 2005, chaired the Department of Chemistry from 2003 to 2007, and advised the rector on research from 2006 to 2009. In 2007 he founded the Centre for Innovation and Research in Polymer Materials (CIRMAP), which he directed until 2016. He then served as the university's vice-rector for research for more than seven years.

Dubois co-founded Materia Nova, a non-profit applied research centre in Mons, and is its president and one of its scientific directors. Through Materia Nova he helped set up the spin-off company GATE2, which markets technologies developed and patented at the centre.

=== Luxembourg ===
In January 2016 Dubois was appointed to lead the newly created National Composite Centre Luxembourg (NCC-L). He was its scientific director and head of the sustainable materials unit at the Luxembourg Institute of Science and Technology (LIST) until 31 August 2017, and returned to the University of Mons on 1 September 2017. He continued to advise the NCC-L on polymer and composite materials.

=== Rector ===
In April 2018 Dubois was elected rector of the University of Mons. He was the only candidate to succeed Calogero Conti and received 83 per cent of the votes. He took office on 1 October 2018. In April 2022, again as the sole candidate, he was re-elected with 82.5 per cent for a second term running until 30 September 2026. The decree on university governance did not allow a third term. His first term was marked by the COVID-19 pandemic, which sped up the move to digital and distance teaching; he kept teaching throughout. He was also permanent co-president of the academic pole of the province of Hainaut, which in 2022 brought together some 37,000 students. Marc Labie was first vice-rector in both terms.

Dubois was the first president of EUNICE, an alliance of European universities, after it became an international non-profit association. Its statutes were signed in Mons on 16 November 2022, and the alliance was to have ten member universities in its second phase. He held the presidency for a first two-year term; Abdelhakim Artiba, president of the Université Polytechnique Hauts-de-France, succeeded him in November 2024.

Laurent Lefebvre was elected as his successor on 10 April 2026. On 30 September 2026 Dubois became pro-rector, a role in which he assists the new rector and has more time for Materia Nova.

=== Other roles ===
In March 2026 Dubois succeeded Yves Smeets as chairman of the board of the CHU Tivoli, a hospital in La Louvière. Since December 2024 King Philippe has chaired a series of working meetings on the economic recovery of the Centre region around La Louvière. In 2026 Dubois was following several of the projects that came out of them, among them a study for a sport and health centre and a campus with several faculties.

== Research ==
Dubois works on the synthesis, processing and properties of polymers and (nano)composites, and much of his work concerns materials from renewable sources. His doctoral work and his first papers, written in Liège with Robert Jérôme and Philippe Teyssié, concerned the controlled ring-opening polymerization of lactones and lactides, the monomers of biodegradable polyesters such as polylactic acid (PLA). One of these papers described the polymerisation of lactide with aluminium isopropoxide. His team patented a catalyst system for producing PLA by reactive extrusion, which according to the University of Montpellier made the first continuous production process for PLA possible. The process was described in a 1999 paper with S. Jacobsen, H. G. Fritz and others. He returned to the subject in a 2022 article on the use of reactive extrusion to deal with plastic waste in the oceans.

His 2000 review with Alexandre on nanocomposites of polymers and layered silicate clays such as montmorillonite surveyed how these materials are made and what properties they have. By 2011 one of his articles had been cited about 2,350 times, according to the Thomson Reuters data used for the ranking of materials scientists. Further reviews followed on flame retardant polymer materials (2009), PLA-based nanocomposites (2013) and PLA composites (2016). His group also grafted polycaprolactone chains onto cellulose nanocrystals, a form of nanocellulose, to make bionanocomposites. With Olivier Coulembier and Jean-Marie Raquez he edited the Handbook of Ring-Opening Polymerization (2009).

Several of his group's results have been taken up by industry. When he received the FNRS prize in 2015, Dubois said that about fifteen of its patents were in industrial use. He gave as examples plastics made from agricultural surplus such as beet, wheat and maize, used for mobile phone cases and car interiors, and a hull paint that reduces the build-up of marine organisms on ships. The University of Montpellier described the paint as free of bactericides. By 2024 he had filed 76 patents, nearly a quarter of which had led to products or processes on the market.

His more recent work includes the enzymatic recycling of bio-based polymers. He is one of the authors of a 2024 paper in Nature, written with researchers from the French company Carbios, on PLA with an engineered enzyme embedded in it so that the plastic breaks down by itself. As holder of the Francqui Chair at the University of Liège in 2021, he gave a series of lectures at Gembloux Agro-Bio Tech on plastic pollution and bioplastics. In October 2026 the Royal Academy published his book on microplastics, La menace invisible des microplastiques. Défis et réponses d'une chimie écoresponsable ("The invisible threat of microplastics: challenges and answers from an eco-responsible chemistry"), in its series L'Académie en poche. He has also lectured on the subject at the academy.

Dubois was an associate editor of Materials Science and Engineering R: Reports. By October 2026 OpenAlex listed about 1,580 publications under his name, cited some 59,000 times, with an h-index of 120.

== Honours and awards ==
- 1999: Triennial Prize of the Société royale de chimie, the Belgian chemical society
- 2010: elected full member of the Class of Sciences of the Royal Academy of Science, Letters and Fine Arts of Belgium (27 March)
- 2013: Grand Prix of the Groupe Français d'Études et d'Applications des Polymères (GFP), the French polymer society
- 2015: FNRS Quinquennial Prize (Dr A. De Leeuw-Damry-Bourlart Prize for applied exact sciences, 2011–2015)
- 2017: N. N. Semenov Medal of the Russian Academy of Engineering Sciences, presented at the Russian embassy in Luxembourg on 24 February 2017
- 2017: Commander of the Order of Leopold, with effect from 8 April 2017 (royal decree of 16 November 2023)
- 2018: Lifetime Achievement Award of the BioEnvironmental Polymer Society (BEPS)
- 2020–2021: Francqui Chair (Belgian title) at the University of Liège, Gembloux Agro-Bio Tech
- 2024: honorary doctorate of the University of Montpellier (31 January)
- 2024: honorary professor of Sichuan University (12 July)
- 2025: honorary professor certificate awarded jointly, for the first time, by National Taiwan University, National Taiwan Normal University and National Taiwan University of Science and Technology (23 April); on the same day he gave a lecture as part of the NTU System Honorary Lectureships

He is also a member of the Engineering Division of the European Academy of Sciences.

== Selected publications ==
- Dubois, Philippe; Jacobs, C.; Jérôme, Robert; Teyssié, Philippe (1991). "Macromolecular engineering of polylactones and polylactides. 4. Mechanism and kinetics of lactide homopolymerization by aluminum isopropoxide". Macromolecules. 24 (9): 2266–2270. doi:10.1021/ma00009a022.
- Alexandre, Michael; Dubois, Philippe (2000). "Polymer-layered silicate nanocomposites: preparation, properties and uses of a new class of materials". Materials Science and Engineering: R: Reports. 28 (1–2): 1–63. doi:10.1016/S0927-796X(00)00012-7.
- Raquez, Jean-Marie; Habibi, Youssef; Murariu, Marius; Dubois, Philippe (2013). "Polylactide (PLA)-based nanocomposites". Progress in Polymer Science. 38 (10–11): 1504–1542. doi:10.1016/j.progpolymsci.2013.05.014.
- Murariu, Marius; Dubois, Philippe (2016). "PLA composites: From production to properties". Advanced Drug Delivery Reviews. 107: 17–46. doi:10.1016/j.addr.2016.04.003.
- Dubois, Philippe (2022). "Reactive Extrusion (REx): Using Chemistry and Engineering to Solve the Problem of Ocean Plastics". Engineering. 14: 15–18. doi:10.1016/j.eng.2021.12.009.
- Dubois, Philippe (2026). La menace invisible des microplastiques. Défis et réponses d'une chimie écoresponsable. L'Académie en poche (in French). Vol. 192. Brussels: Académie royale de Belgique. ISBN 978-2-8031-1081-0.
