= Eija Krogerus =

Finnish bowler

Eija Krogerus (19 June 1932 – 7 October 2018) was a former female bowler from Finland. She represented the Finnish national team continuously for 21 years, from 1962 until 1983. Called the "Grand Old Lady" of Finnish women's bowling, she was inducted into the WBW International Bowling Hall of Fame in 2002, almost 20 years after retiring from competitive bowling at 51.

In her career, she won two team World Championships, five European team championships, seven individual Finnish championships, one Helsinki Championship, as well as two individual World Championship silver medals. She retired from the National Team after the European Cup Individual 1983.

She was born in Helsinki, completing her schooling from Arkadia Coeducational School. Her interest in bowling emerged from her time studying accounting in the US. She worked as an accountant at a pharmaceutical company. She died in 2018 from a rapidly progressing disease.
