= Ann-Maree Putney =

Australian ten-pin bowler

Sport
- Country: Australia
- Sport: Bowling

Achievements and titles
- World finals: 2007 AMF Bowling World Cup: Champion
Medal record
Representing Australia
Women's Bowling
World Tenpin Bowling Championships
Gold medal – first place	1999 United Arab Emirates	Masters
Bronze medal – third place	2013 Nevada	Doubles
Women's Bowling World Championships
Silver medal – second place	2007 Mexico	Singles
Bronze medal – third place	2007 Mexico	All Events
Silver medal – second place	2009 Las Vegas	Doubles
World Team Cup
Bronze medal – third place	2003 Denmark	Team
Commonwealth Championships
Gold medal – first place	2002 Scotland	Doubles
Silver medal – second place	2002 Scotland	Masters
Silver medal – second place	2002 Scotland	Mixed
Silver medal – second place	2002 Scotland	Team
Bronze medal – third place	2002 Scotland	All Events
Gold medal – first place	2005 Cyprus	Singles
Silver medal – second place	2005 Cyprus	All Events
Bronze medal – third place	2005 Cyprus	Team
Gold medal – first place	2006 Melbourne	Singles
Gold medal – first place	2006 Melbourne	All Events
Silver medal – second place	2006 Melbourne	Mixed Doubles
Bronze medal – third place	2013 New Zealand	Doubles

Ann-Maree Putney of New South Wales is a female Australian two-time World Champion ten-pin bowler. In 2009, she was elected to the World Bowling Writers International Bowling Hall of Fame. She competed for Australia for 26 years, winning a total of 30 medals in international competitions such as the World, Asian, and Commonwealth Championships. In 2019, she was inducted into the Tenpin Bowling Australia (TBA) Hall of Fame as well as the Hunter Region Sporting Hall of Fame. Her career spanned 34 years.

Putney earned her first world title in the 1999 World Championships Masters crown in Abu Dhabi then the QubicaAMF Bowling World Cup in 2007 in St. Petersburg, Russia. She also won bronze in the women's doubles world championships in Nevada in 2014 with Carol Gianotti.

== Achievements ==
=== World Championships ===
- 1999- World FIQ Tenpin Boling Championships, UAE - GOLD Masters Champion
- 2003- World Team Challenge, Denmark - BRONZE Team
- 2007 -Women's World Bowling Championships, Mexico – SILVER Medal Singles
- 2007- Women's World Bowling Championships, Mexico – BRONZE Medal All Events
- 2009 -Women's World Bowling Championships, USA – SILVER Medal Doubles
- 2013 -Combined World Championships – BRONZE Medal Women's Doubles

=== Asian Championships ===
- 1991- Asian Youth Tenpin Bowling Championship, Guam – GOLD Teams
- 1994- Asian Tenpin Bowling Championship, Guam – SILVER Teams
- 1998- Asian Tenpin Bowling Championship, Taiwan SILVER Teams
- 2000- FIQ Team Asian Zone, Qatar – GOLD Doubles & BRONZE Masters
- 2004- Asian Tenpin Championships Silver Medal Doubles & Silver Medal Masters

=== Commonwealth Championships ===
- 2002- I Commonwealth Championships – GOLD, 3x SILVER & 2x BRONZE
- 2005- II Commonwealth Championships – GOLD Singles & BRONZE Doubles, Mixed Teams & BRONZE Masters
- 2006- III Commonwealth Championships – GOLD Singles, SILVER Mixed Doubles, Mixed Teams, Bronze Doubles & Silver Masters
- 2013- IV Commonwealth Championships – GOLD Medal Mixed Doubles
- 2013- IV Commonwealth Championships – BRONZE Medal Women's Doubles

=== QubicaAMF Bowling World Cup Results ===
- 2007- Champion QubicaAMF Bowling World Cup, St Petersburg Russia
- 2008- Runner Up QubicaAMF Bowling World Cup, Hermosillo Mexico

=== National Titles ===
- 1994, 1998, 1999, 2001, 2007, 2011, 2012- Vic 150
- 1994 & 2008- Australian Masters
- 1999, 2004 & 2007- Adelaide Women's Cup
- 2000, 2001, 2007 & 2008- South Pacific Champion
- 2002, 2007, 2011 & 2013- NSW Open
- 2004, 2005 & 2009- Queensland Ladies Cup
- 2005 & 2008- K&K Classic
- 2008- Melbourne International Tenpin Cup

=== Recognition ===
- 2019 Induction to the Tenpin Bowling Australia (TBA) Hall of Fame
- 2019 Induction to the Hunter Region Sporting Hall of Fame
- 2009- Induction to the World Bowling Writers Hall of Fame

=== Australian Team Representative Honors ===
- 1991-2014- Australian Team Member Every Year

=== Achievements for the sport of tenpin bowling ===
- 1989-2009- Australian Tenpin Bowling "All Stars" Team Member
- Rachuig Team member for 21 years and Team captain
- Prime Minister of Australia – "Letter of Congratulations"
- 3x New South Wales Government – "Certificate of Recognition"
- 4x Channel 10 Television – "Outstanding Contribution to Sport"
