= Helén Johnsson =

Swedish ten-pin bowler

Helen Johnsson (born 18 October 1976) is a Swedish ten-pin bowler. She finished in 6th position of the combined rankings at the 2006 AMF World Cup. During the final round she finished in 2nd position.
