= International Bowling Federation =

Sports federation for nine- and ten-pin bowling

- Formation: 1952
- Type: Sports federation
- Headquarters: Lausanne, Switzerland
- Members: 134 national federations
- Official language: English, German, French, Spanish
- President: Sheikh Talal Mohammad Al-Sabah
- Website: bowling.sport

International Bowling Federation (IBF), formerly known as the Fédération Internationale des Quilleurs (FIQ) from 1952 to April 2014 and as World Bowling (WB) from April 2014 to November 2020, is the world governing body of nine-pin and ten-pin bowling. IBF was founded in 1952 in Hamburg, Germany by officials of the International Bowling Association (founded 1926) to grow worldwide interest in amateur ten-pin and nine-pin bowling, as well as international friendship by encouraging world and zone tournaments and other competition between bowlers of different countries. IBF has been recognized by the International Olympic Committee since 1979 as the governing body for bowling sports. Starting with five member federations in 1952, it grew to 141 in 2010. IBF has member federations located in all five Olympic regions.

== Tasks ==
- To encourage the development of tenpin and ninepin bowling throughout the world.
- To foster international friendship by promoting national and international competition in tenpin and ninepin bowling.
- To pursue the recognition of tenpin and ninepin bowling as a fully recognized athletic competition in the Olympic Games.
- To support national organisations that promote tenpin and ninepin bowling within their respective countries and the world as a whole.

== History ==
=== The foundation of IBF ===
The first attempt to coordinate the sport of bowling at the world level by organizing world championships and by bringing uniformity through universal playing rules, was undertaken in 1926 by Finland, Germany, the Netherlands, Sweden, and the United States with the formation of the International Bowling Association (IBA).

In December 1951, the officials of the IBA took initiative to invite delegates from all interested countries to come to Hamburg, West Germany on 27 January 1952 to discuss the status of bowling and the possible re-activation of the IBA.

Representatives of the following countries attended the meeting in Hamburg, West Germany:

- Austria
- Belgium
- Finland
- France
- West Germany
- Yugoslavia
- Sweden
- Switzerland
- Luxembourg (represented by proxy given to Belgium)

The unanimous decision of all present was to form a new international bowling federation. The first proposal was to make it a European federation, but it was pointed out that the United States, being a strong ten-pin country, may also want to affiliate. The new federation would become a worldwide international organisation with 4 different sections: One for Tenpin bowling and 3 for Ninepin bowling: Asphalt (later: Classic), Bohle and Schere.

The new organisation would be named as proposed by René Weiss from France, Fédération Internationale des Quilleurs (FIQ – International federation of Bowlers). Heinz Kropp from Germany was elected as its first President. Also Section Presidents were elected: for Tenpin Bowling – Hans Berger from Sweden; for the Asphalt Section – Leopold Hatzi from Austria; for the Bohle Section – Willi Stark from Germany; and for the Schere Section – Francois van Arkels from Belgium.

Country	Tenpin	Classic	Bohle	Schere
Belgium	X			X
Finland	X			
West Germany	X	X	X	X
Sweden	X			
Switzerland	X			
Austria	X	X		
France		X		
Yugoslavia		X		
Denmark		X	X	
Netherlands			X	X
Luxembourg	X	X		X

Although Denmark was not present at the meeting, it had promised to attend and for this reason considered as a member and included among the countries practicing Bohle.

All federations were given the task to prepare for each respective section, playing rules as well as regulations for equipment and to circulate such information among the member federations for comments before the next ordinary meeting. Weiss and Hatzi were authorized to draft a proposal for a FIQ Constitution respecting the IOC regulations.

=== European and world Championships ===
The first official IBF Championship was decided upon:

- First European Championships of Asphalt were given to Zagreb, Yugoslavia, in May/June 1952.
- First European Championships of Schere were given to Brussels, Belgium, in July 1952.

The ten-pin section was planning to conduct its 1st World Championships in Helsinki, Finland, in July 1952 during the Olympic Games. But because of Germany's disagreement based on the fact that three championships in the first year would be financially a heavy burden for the federation, it was decided that the Ten-pin Championships should be postponed to 1954.

After the circulation of the minutes of that Conference, Austria wanted to add as a leading principle for the newly established FIQ, that the Chairmanship of the FIQ or of a Section is not given to a nation, but to a person who has been elected to the position. That person would also have the right to lead their own national federation. The FIQ received its first funds from the former IBA, which was eventually dissolved in March 1952.

One of the immediate tasks for the new leadership was to recruit more member federations. Either Ninepin or Tenpin could be found in:

- Argentina
- Bulgaria
- Canada
- Czechoslovakia
- England
- Hungary
- Poland
- Romania
- Saarland
- Spain
- United States

It took some time, but in the first year, Czechoslovakia, Hungary, Saarland, and Spain accepted the invitation. Later, the German Democratic Republic (the former East Germany) and the Netherlands also accepted to be members.

In the first year (1952) there were also disappointments, because the 1st European Asphalt Championships had to be cancelled due to delayed preparations; they were moved to Zürich, Switzerland. The Championships for Schere, however, were held and were attended by participants from five countries.

=== Congresses ===
The first FIQ Congress was hosted by the German federation in November 1952 in Munich; eight member federations attended. During that meeting, the first FIQ Constitution was adopted and it became the guideline and law for almost 20 years. Also a scale and method for charging annual membership fees was adopted. Also this lasted almost 20 years until the first raise of annual fees and a new scale were found necessary. Another decision adopted, which would be impossible to follow today, was that the official language for all Congress meetings was German. Rules, however, were to be printed also in English and French.

The last congresses in the history of the Federation Internationale des Quilleurs (FIQ) and World Tenpin Bowling Association (WTBA) were held in Abu Dhabi, United Arab Emirates, on Tuesday, December 15, 2015, during which the merger of the two organizations into one entity, World Bowling.

World Bowling has officially changed its name to the International Bowling Federation (IBF) and has vowed to properly act as the sport's global governing body. The decision was made at the organization's Extraordinary Congress, which was held online due to the COVID-19 pandemic, on 2 November 2020.

List of FIQ/World Bowling congresses:

Year	Host	
1952	Munich	West Germany
1953	Zürich	Switzerland
1955	Saarbrücken	West Germany
1957	Vienna	Austria
1959	Leipzig	East Germany
1961	Strasbourg	France
1963	Budapest	Hungary
1965	Stockholm	Sweden
1967	Salzburg	Austria
1969	Mamaia	Romania
1971	Milwaukee	United States
1973	Dublin	Ireland
1975	London	England
1977	Helsinki	Finland
1979	Manila	Philippines
1981	Milwaukee	United States
1983	Caracas	Venezuela
1985	Vienna	Austria
1987	Helsinki	Finland
1989	Wichita	United States
1991	Singapore	Singapore
1993	Rome	Italy
1995	Reno	United States
1997	Nottingham	England
2001	Abu Dhabi	United Arab Emirates
2003	Kuala Lumpur	Malaysia
2005	Aalborg	Denmark
2007	Monterrey	Mexico
2009	Las Vegas	United States
2010	Munich	Germany
2011	Kowloon	Hong Kong
2015	Abu Dhabi	United Arab Emirates
2020	Online	
2023	Kuwait	Kuwait
2025	Hong Kong	China

=== Members ===
1953 brought six more member federations and in 1954 FIQ had 15 member federations in total. It took five more years (1959) to register the first non-European member federations: Mexico and Venezuela. The two countries had participated in 1958 in the World Tenpin Championships in Helsingborg, Sweden, as provisional members. The Constitution provided the Presidium the authority to grant new member federations provisional membership status, to be confirmed (or rejected) at the next regular congress.

The development of the membership looks as follows:

Year	Associations
1952	5 national associations
1954	15 national associations
1959	17 national associations
1961	32 national associations
1969	41 national associations
1975	52 national associations
1981	64 national associations
1987	73 national associations
1991	79 national associations
1995	89 national associations
2007	134 national associations
2020	114 national associations

=== Presidents ===
Year	Name	Country
1952 – 1953	Heinz Kopp	West Germany
1953 – 1955	Dr. Iwan Krizanic	Yugoslavia
1955 – 1973	Adolf Oesch	Switzerland
1973 – 1977	Kauko Ahlström	Finland
1977 – 1983	Frank K. Baker	United States
1983 – 1984	Soetopo Jananto (Jap Soei-Kie)	Indonesia
1985 – 1995	Roger H. Tessman	United States
1995 – 2003	Gerald L. Koenig	United States
2003 – 2007	Steve Hontiveros	Philippines
2007 – 2011	Jessie Phua	Singapore
2011 – 2015	Kevin Dornberger	United States
since 2015	Sheikh Talal Mohammad Al-Sabah	Kuwait

=== Disciplines ===
IBF regulates two disciplines – tenpin and ninepin. The two organisations that administer the disciplines are the World Tenpin Bowling Association (WTBA) and the World Ninepin Bowling Association (WNBA). Both organizations were founded by FIQ in 1973.

World Tenpin Bowling Association (WTBA)

- Asian Bowling Federation (ABF)
- European Tenpin Bowling Federation (ETBF)
- Pan American Bowling Confederation (PABCON)

World Ninepin Bowling Association (WNBA)

- Section Classic (NBC)
- Section Bohle (NBB)
- Section Schere (NBS)

== See also ==
- Association of IOC Recognised International Sports Federations
- Professional Bowlers Association
