= List of world bowling champions =

This article is a list of world champions in Ten-pin bowling in the tournaments listed below-

- World Championships of the International Bowling Federation IBF (formerly World Bowling), owns the World Championships and is under the International Olympic Committee. It is a sanctioning body for all international ten-pin bowling tournaments. Championships are held every 4 years and six male and six female from participating nations compete for medals for their flag.
- The World Games, which include all sports that are not included in the Olympics. Championships are held every 4 years, in the years following the Summer Olympic Games. Male and female participants compete for medals for their flag.
- The Professional Bowlers Association world championships. PBA is the major sanctioning body for the sport of professional ten-pin bowling in the United States. The PBA World Championship is one of five major PBA bowling events.
- The QubicaAMF Bowling World Cup, previously known as the International Masters and AMF Bowling World Cup, is an annual championship sponsored by QubicaAMF Worldwide and played exclusively on AMF equipment. One male and/or one female bowler represents a nation in the tournament and a champion is declared.
- Other commercial or invitational world championship events.
- IBSA, the International Blind Sports Federation.
- World Deaf Bowling Championships

== The World Championships ==
The World Championships is owned by International Bowling Federation (formerly known as World Bowling). From 1963 to 2003, and from 2013 the world championships were conducted every fourth year. The two genders were divided beginning in 2005 in addition to the Combined World Championships. Participating countries sends 6 women and 6 men on each team for men and women.

See World Tenpin Bowling Championships for the playing format.

=== Masters ===
Masters Champions
Year	Host	Men	Women
1954	Helsinki	(Sweden) Gösta Algeskog	-
1955	Essen	(Sweden) Nils Bäckström	-
1958	Helsingborg	(Finland) Kalle Asukas	-
1960	Hamburg	(Mexico) Tito Reynolds	-
1963	Mexico City	(United States) Lez Zikes	(United States) Helen Shablis
1967	Malmö	(England) David Pond	(United States) Helen Weston
1971	Milwaukee	(United States) Edwin Luther	(Puerto Rico) Ashie Gonzalez
1975	London	(United States) Marvin Stoudt	(Germany) Anne-Dore Häfker
1979	Manila	(England) Gerry Bugden	(Philippines) Lita de la Rosa
1983	Caracas	(United States) Tony Cariello	(Sweden) Lena Sulkanen
1987	Helsinki	(Belgium) Roger Pieters	(Sweden) Anette Hägre
1991	Singapore	(Finland) Mika Koivuniemi	(Canada) Catherine Willis
1995	Reno	(Chinese Taipei) Chen-Min Yang	(Mexico) Celia Flores
1999	Abu Dhabi	(Qatar) Ahmed Shaheen	(Australia) Ann-Maree Putney
2003	Kuala Lumpur	(Australia) Michael Little	(United States) Diandra Hyman
2005	Aalborg	-	(China) Sui-Ling Yang
2006	Busan	(Philippines) Biboy Rivera	-
2007	Monterrey	-	(United States) Diandra Asbaty
2008	Bangkok	(United States) Walter Ray Williams	-
2009	Las Vegas	-	(Colombia) Clara Guerrero
2010	Las Vegas	(United States) Chris Barnes	-
2011	Hong Kong	-	(United States) Shannon Pluhowsky
2013	Las Vegas	(South Korea) Young-Seon Cho	(South Korea) Yun-Hee Son
2014	Abu Dhabi	(South Korea) Hee-Won Kang	-
2015	Abu Dhabi	-	(South Korea) Daw-Un Jung
2017	Las Vegas	(Canada) Francois Lavoie	(South Korea) Daw-Un Jung
2018	Hong Kong	(Canada) Mitch Hupe	-
2019	Las Vegas	-	(Singapore) Cherie Tan

=== All Events ===
The All-Events is the combined games from singles, doubles, trios and 5-player team.

All Events Champions
Year	Host	Men	Women
1979	Manila	(Australia) Eric Thompson	(Philippines) Bong Coo
1983	Caracas	(Sweden) Mats Karlsson	(Philippines) Bong Coo
1987	Helsinki	(United States) Rick Steelsmith	(United States) Sandra Jo Shiery
1991	Singapore	(Chinese Taipei) Ying-Chieh Ma	(Denmark) Helle Andersen
1995	Reno	(Netherlands) Michael Sassen	(Finland) Jaana Puhakka
1999	Abu Dhabi	(Norway) Tore Torgersen	(Australia) Amanda Bradley
2003	Kuala Lumpur	(Sweden) Anders Öhman	(England) Zara Glover
2005	Aalborg	-	(Chinese Taipei) Yu-Ling Wang
2006	Busan	(Singapore) Remy Ong	-
2007	Monterrey	-	(South Korea) Jin-A Choy
2008	Bangkok	(South Korea) Bok-Eum Choi	-
2009	Las Vegas	-	(Colombia) Clara Guerrero
2010	Las Vegas	(United States) Bill O'Neill	-
2011	Hong Kong	-	(Denmark) Mai Ginge Jensen
2013	Las Vegas	(United States) Chris Barnes	(United States) Shannon O'Keefe
2014	Abu Dhabi	(South Korea) Bok-Eum Choi	-
2015	Abu Dhabi	-	(Singapore) Shayna Ng
2017	Las Vegas	(Chinese Taipei) Hao-Ming Wu	(United States) Danielle McEwan
2018	Hong Kong	(United States) EJ Tackett	-
2019	Las Vegas	-	(Colombia) María Rodríguez

=== Singles ===
Singles Champions
Year	Host	Men	Women
1979	Manila	(Philippines) Ollie Ongtawco	(Philippines) Lita dela Rosa
1983	Caracas	(Colombia) Armando Marino	(Sweden) Lena Sulkanen
1987	Helsinki	(France) Patrick Rolland	(Mexico) Edda Piccini
1991	Singapore	(Chinese Taipei) Ying-Chieh Ma	(Germany) Martina Beckel
1995	Reno	(Canada) Marc Doi	(Canada) Debby Ship
1999	Abu Dhabi	(Belgium) Gery Verbruggen	(United States) Kelly Kulick
2003	Kuala Lumpur	(Finland) Mika Luoto	(England) Zara Glover
2005	Aalborg	-	(Malaysia) Esther Cheah
2006	Busan	(Singapore) Remy Ong	-
2007	Monterrey	-	(United States) Shannon O'Keefe
2008	Bangkok	(United States) Walter Ray Williams	-
2009	Las Vegas	-	(United States) Stefanie Nation
2010	Las Vegas	(United States) Bill O'Neill	-
2011	Hong Kong	-	(Malaysia) Jacqueline Sijore
2013	Las Vegas	(United States) Bill O'Neill	(South Korea) Seo-Yeon Ryu
2014	Abu Dhabi	(Canada) Dan MacLelland	-
2015	Abu Dhabi	-	(South Korea) Eun-Hee Jeon
2017	Las Vegas	(Netherlands) Xander van Mazijk	(Japan) Futaba Imai
2018	Hong Kong	(Malaysia) Muhammad Ismail Rafiq	-
2019	Las Vegas	-	(United States) Danielle McEwan
2023	Kuwait City	(Singapore) Darren Ong	(Malaysia) Natasha Roslan
2025	Hong Kong	(Finland) Luukas Väänänen	(Finland) Essi Pakarinen

=== Doubles, Trios and Team ===
The World Championships is owned by International Bowling Federation (formerly known as World Bowling). Doubles, Trios and Team events of the World Championships are listed below.

World Champions
Year	Host	Doubles		Trios		Team (5 players + 1 constructive)	
Year	Host	Men	Women	Men	Women	Men	Women
1954	Helsinki	Finland: 1. Osmo Koivunen; 2. Odin Koskinen					
1955	Essen	Sweden: 1. Pelle Phil; 2. Fritiof Söderberg					
1958	Helsingborg	Sweden: 1. Evert Lindbergh; 2. Carl-Gustav Carjö					
1960	Hamburg	Mexico: 1. Tito Reynolds; 2. Miguel Anaya					
1963	Mexico City	United States: 1. Jim Schroeder; 2. Bud Oswalt	United States: 1. Helen Shablis; 2. Dorothy Wilkinsson				
1967	Malmö	England: 1. David Pond; 2. J E S Morley	Mexico: 1. Tea Orozco; 2. Alicia Sarabia				
1971	Milwaukee	Puerto Rico: 1. Rolaldo Sebelen; 2. Carlos Diaz	Japan: 1. Yoshimi Fukuda; 2. Michiko Hirooka				
1975	London	England: 1. Brian Michael; 2. Bernie Caterer	Sweden: 1. Britt Cederbrink; 2. Svea Ljungkvist				
Year	Host	Doubles		Trios		Team (5 players + 1 constructive)	
Year	Host	Men	Women	Men	Women	Men	Women
1979	Manila	Australia: 1. Eric Thompson; 2. Ronald Powell	Philippines: 1. Lita de la Rosa; 2. Bong Coo	Malaysia: 1. Allan Hooi; 2. Edward Lim; 3. J. B. Koo	United States: 1. Annese Kelly; 2. Cindy Schuble; 3. Jacquelyn Stormo	Australia: 1. Eric Thompson; 2. Kevin Quinn; 3. Gary Anthony Kee; 4. John Sullivan; 5. Ronald Powell; 6. Bruce Kennedy	United States: 1. Cindy Schuble; 2. Sandi Tice; 3. Betty Maw; 4. Jacquelyn Stormo; 5. Annese Kelly; 6. Regina Hillier
1983	Caracas	England: 1. Chris Buck; 2. Alan Fawcett; Australia: 1. Ken Harding; 2. John Sullivan	Denmark: 1. Birgitte Jensen; 2. Jette Hansen	Sweden: 1. Kenneth Andersson; 2. Tony Rosenquist; 3. Mats Karlsson	Germany: 1. Hani Hoplitchek; 2. Christel Helisler; 3. Gisela Lins	Finland: 1. Mikko Kaartinen; 2. Sam Anker Martti; 3. Koskela Hannu Närhi; 4. Simo Vähäkorpela; 5. Ailo Votila	Sweden: 1. Karin Glennert; 2. Gerda Öhman; 3. Aasa Larsson; 4. Lena Sulkanen; 5. Yvonne Berndt; 6. Ingrid Andersell
1987	Helsinki	Sweden: 1. Ulf Hämnäs; 2. Ulf Bolleby	United States: 1. Cora Fiebig; 2. Kathy Wodka	United States: 1. Dan Nadeau; 2. Duane Sandvick; 3. Rick Steelsmith	United States: 1. Sue Holton; 2. Karen Bender; 3. Nellie Glandon	Sweden: 1. Raymond Jansson; 2. Per Jansson; 3. Ulf Hämnäs; 4. Ulf Bolleby; 5. Tony Rosenquist; 6. Gunnar Samuelsson	United States: 1. Nellie Glandon; 2. Karen Bender; 3. Sandra Jo Shiery; 4. Kathy Wodka; 5. Cora Fiebig; 6. Sue Holton
1991	Singapore	United States: 1. Pat Healey; 2. Steve Kloempken	Japan: 1. Tomoko Hatanaka; 2. Kumiko Inatsu	United States: 1. Pat Healey; 2. Vince Biondo; 3. Steve Kloempken	Canada: 1. Catherine Willis; 2. Jane Amlinger; 3. Anne Saasto	Chinese Taipei: 1. Ying-Chieh Ma; 2. Chien-Yi Tang; 3. Cheng-Ming Yang; 4. Te-Lin Lai; 5. Chao-Hsiung Lin; 6. Peng-Sheng Cheng	South Korea: 1. Mi-Sun Shin; 2. Hae-Hyung Lee; 3. Young-Sim Kim; 4. Mi-Suk Cho; 5. Hyun-Suk Hong; 6. Sook-Young Kim
1995	Reno	Sweden: 1. Tomas Leandersson; 2. Raymond Jansson	Thailand: 1. Kanit Kitchatham; 2. Phetchara Kaewsuk	Netherlands: 1. Erwin Groen; 2. Niko Thienpondt; 3. Michael Sassen	Australia: 1. Cara Honeychurch; 2. Sharon McLeish; 3. Sue Cassell	Netherlands: 1. Erwin Groen; 2. Maarten Krull; 3. Michael Sassen; 4. Niko Thienpondt; 5. Geert van Baest; 6. Marcel van den Bosch	Finland: 1. Jaana Puhakka; 2. Anu Peltola; 3. Pauliina Aalto; 4. Heta-Maija Allen; 5. Reija Lundén; 6. Leena Pulliainen
1999	Abu Dhabi	Sweden: 1. Patrick Backe; 2. Martin Blixt	Australia: 1. Joy Haymen; 2. Amanda Bradley	Finland: 1. Antti-Pekka Lax; 2. Lasse Lintilä; 3. Ari Halme	South Korea: 1. Jin-Hee Park; 2. Sun-Hwa Kim; 3. Ji-Yeon Lee	Sweden: 1. Tomas Leandersson; 2. Patrick Backe; 3. Johan Damberg; 4. Martin Blixt; 5. Raymond Jansson; 6. Göran Carlsson	South Korea: 1. Mi-Jung Cha; 2. Ji-Yeon Lee; 3. Sun-Hwa Kim; 4. Jin-Hee Park; 5. Hee-Soon Kim; 6. Mi-Young Lee
2003	Kuala Lumpur	Sweden: 1. Tomas Leandersson; 2. Anders Öhman	England: 1. Zara Glover; 2. Kirsten Penny	United States: 1. Dino Castillo; 2. Bill Hoffman; 3. Tim Mack	Philippines: 1. Liza del Rosario; 2. Liza Clutario; 3. Cecilia Yap	Sweden: 1. Martin Blixt; 2. Martin Larsen; 3. Patrick Backe; 4. Anders Öhman; 5. Tomas Leandersson; 6. Robert Andersson	Malaysia: 1. Sarah Yap; 2. Choy Poh Lai; 3. Sharon Chai; 4. Wendy Chai; 5. Shalin Zulkifli; 6. Lai Kin Ngoh
2005	Aalborg	-	Germany: 1. Martina Beckel; 2. Tanya Petty	-	Chinese Taipei: 1. Yu-Ling Wang; 2. Chiung-Yao Huang; 3. Miao-Lin Chou	-	Chinese Taipei: 1. Yu-Ling Wang; 2. Chiung-Yao Huang; 3. Miao-Lin Chou; 4. I-Fen Lin; 5. Ya-Ting Wang; 6. Hsin-Yi Tsai
2006	Busan	Sweden: 1. Martin Larsen; 2. Robert Andersson	-	South Korea: 1. Tae-Won Kim; 2. Jong-In Choi; 3. Seoung-Joo Joung	-	United States: 1. Scott Pohl; 2. Ronnie Sparks; 3. David Haynes; 4. Rhino Page; 5. Bill Hoffman; 6. Dan Patterson	-
2007	Monterrey	-	South Korea: 1. Jin-A Choy; 2. Bo-Ra Nam	-	Sweden: 1. Helén Johnsson; 2. Malin Glendert; 3. Nina Flack	-	Malaysia: 1. Esther Cheah; 2. Shalin Zulkifli; 3. Sharon Koh; 4. Wendy Chai; 5. Zandra Aziela; 6. Choy Poh Lai
2008	Bangkok	United States: 1. Patrick Allen; 2. Rhino Page	-	South Korea: 1. Bok-Eum Choi; 2. Ki-Bong Choi; 3. Tae-Young Kim	-	United States: 1. Walter Ray Williams; 2. Chris Barnes; 3. Tommy Jones; 4. Bill Hoffman; 5. Patrick Allen; 6. Rhino Page	-
2009	Las Vegas	-	South Korea: 1. Sun-Ok Hwang; 2. Hye-Eun Gang	-	Chinese Taipei: 1. Hao-Ting Yang; 2. Hsin-Yi Tsai; 3. Ya-Chun Tang	-	South Korea: 1. Sun-Ok Hwang; 2. Hye-Eun Gang; 3. Yun-Hee Jeon; 4. Yun-Hee Son; 5. Su-Yeon Hong; 6. Yeau-Jin Kim
2010	Las Vegas	Sweden: 1. Martin Paulsson; 2. Mathias Aarup	-	United States: 1. Patrick Allen; 2. Rhino Page; 3. Wes Malott	-	United States: 1. Bill O'Neill; 2. Patrick Allen; 3. Wes Malott; 4. Chris Barnes; 5. Tommy Jones; 6. Rhino Page	
2011	Hong Kong	-	United States: 1. Shannon Pluhowsky; 2. Liz Johnson	-	United States: 1. Stefanie Nation; 2. Shannon Pluhowsky; 3. Shannon O'Keefe	-	United States: 1. Carolyn Dorin-Ballard; 2. Shannon Pluhowsky; 3. Shannon O'Keefe; 4. Kelly Kulick; 5. Liz Johnson; 6. Stefanie Nation
2013	Las Vegas	United States: 1. John Szczerbinski; 2. Chris Barnes	United States: 1. Shannon O'Keefe; 2. Stefanie Nation	Canada: 1. Mark Buffa; 2. Francois Lavoie; 3. Patrick Girard	South Korea: 1. Seo-Yeon Ryu; 2. Na-Young Lee; 3. Yun-Hee Son	Finland: 1. Perttu Jussila; 2. Toni Ranta; 3. Petteri Salonen; 4. Pasi Uotila; 5. Osku Palermaa; 6. Joonas Jehkinen	South Korea: 1. Seo-Yeon Ryu; 2. Na-Young Lee; 3. Moon-Jeong; 4. Kim Da-Wun; 5. Jung Yun-Hee; 6. Son Seung-Ja Baek"
2014	Abu Dhabi	South Korea: 1. Jong-Woo Park; 2. Bok-Eum Choi	-	Denmark: 1. Frederik Öhrgaard; 2. Carsten W. Hansen; 3. Thomas Larsen	-	South Korea: 1. Jong-Woo Park; 2. Bok-Eum Choi; 3. Hee-Won Kang; 4. Hae-Sol Hong; 5. Seung-Hyeon Shin; 6. Kyung-Min Kim	
2015	Abu Dhabi	-	United States: 1. Danielle McEwan; 2. Kelly Kulick	-	South Korea: 1. Hye-Rin Son; 2. Jin-Sun Kim; 3. Seung-Ja Baek	-	United States: 1. Shannon Pluhowsky; 2. Stefani Johnson; 3. Shannon O'Keefe; 4. Kelly Kulick; 5. Danielle McEwan; 6. Liz Johnson
2017	Las Vegas	United States: 1. Chris Barnes; 2. Tommy Jones	South Korea: 1. Daw-Un Jung; 2. Moon-Jeong Kim	Hong Kong: 1. Eric Tseng; 2. Siu-Hong Wu; 3. Michael Mak	United States: 1. Danielle McEwan; 2. Kelly Kulick; 3. Shannon O'Keefe	United States: 1. Chris Barnes; 2. AJ Johnson; 3. Tommy Jones; 4. Marshall Kent; 5. Chris Via; 6. Jakob Butturff	Malaysia: 1. Syaidatul Afifah; 2. Natsaha Roslan; 3. Siti Safiyah; 4. Shalin Zulkifli; 5. Li-Jane Sin; 6. Esther Cheah
2018	Hong Kong	Malaysia: 1. Adrian Ang; 2. Tun Al-Hakim	-	United States: 1. E. J. Tackett; 2. Kyle Troup; 3. Andrew Anderson	-	Italy: 1. Marco Reviglio; 2. Pierpaolo De Filippi; 3. Nicola Pongolini; 4. Erik Davolio; 5. Antonino Fiorentino; 6. Marco Parapini	-
2019	Las Vegas	-	Sweden: 1. Josefine Hermansson; 2. Jenny Wegner	-	United States: 1. Missy Parkin; 2. Jordan Richard; 3. Liz Kuhlkin	-	Colombia: 1. Juliana Franco; 2. Rocio Restrepo; 3. Laura Plazas; 4. Clara Guerrero; 5. María Rodríguez; 6. Anggie Ramírez
2023	Kuwait City	Korea: 1. Kim Kyung-min; 2. Kim Dong-hyeon	Singapore: 1. Daphne Tan; 2. Cherie Tan	Hong Kong: 1. Tony Wong; 2. Ivan Tse; 3. Wu Siu Hong	Korea: 1. Jung Da-wun; 2. Hong Hae-ni; 3. Kim Hyun-mi	Canada: 1. Austyn Ducharme; 2. Jordan Jung; 3. Nathan Ruest-Lajoie; 4. Mitch Hupe; 5. Darren Alexander; 6. François Lavoie	Korea: 1. Kim Hyun-mi; 2. Son Hye-rin; 3. Ka Yun-mi; 4. Baek Seung-ja; 5. Jung Da-wun; 6. Hong Hae-ni
2025	Hong Kong	Romania: 1. Mihai-Alin Dragnia; 2. Máté Balázs-Bécsi	Finland: 1. Essi Pakarinen; 2. Peppi Konsteri	Sweden: 1. James Blomgren; 2. Joachim Karlsson; 3. Pontus Andersson	Finland: 1. Ani Juntunen; 2. Peppi Konsteri; 3. Essi Pakarinen	France: 1. Mike Bartaire; 2. Loïck Coolen; 3. Maxime Dubois; 4. Gaëtan Mouveroux; 5. Grégory Rius; 6. Valentin Saulnier	United States: 1. Julia Bond; 2. Breanna Clemmer; 3. Bryanna Coté; 4. Jillian Martin; 5. Shannon Pluhowsky; 6. Lauren Russo
Year	Host	Men	Women	Men	Women	Men	Women
Year	Host	Doubles		Trios		Team (5 players + 1 constructive)	

== World Games ==
Sports not included in the Olympic games are a part of the World Games. Bowling is played since 1981, every fourth year.

=== Singles ===
Singles Champions
Year	Host	Men	Women
1981	Santa Clara	(Norway) Arne Svein Strøm	(France) Liliane Gregori
1985	London	(Sweden) Raymond Jansson	(Singapore) Adelene Wee
1989	Karlsruhe	(Chinese Taipei) Ma Ying-Chieh	(Canada) Jane Amlinger
1993	The Hague	(Sweden) Tomas Leandersson	(United Kingdom) Pauline Smith
1997	Lahti	(Belgium) Gery Verbruggen	(Germany) Patricia Schwarz
2001	Akita	(Germany) Tobias Gäbler	(Guatemala) Sofia Matilde Rodriguez
2005	Duisburg	(Finland) Kai Virtanen	(South Korea) Kim Soo-Kyung
2009	Kaohsiung	(Colombia) Manuel Otalora	(Finland) Krista Pöllänen
2013	Cali	(Finland) Osku Palermaa	(Ukraine) Daria Kovalova
2017	Wrocław	(South Korea) Cho Young-Seon	(United States) Kelly Kulick

=== All Events, Doubles, Mixed Doubles ===
World Games Champions in All Events, Doubles and Mixed Doubles
Year	Host	All Events		Doubles		Mixed Doubles
Year	Host	Men	Women	Men	Women	Mixed Doubles
1981	Santa Clara	Played Singles		Played mixed doubles only		Australia (AUS); Ruth Guerster; Chris Batson
1985	London	Sweden Raymond Jansson	West Germany Gisela Lins	Played mixed doubles only		Belgium (BEL); Nora Haveneers; Dominique De Nolf
1989	Karlsruhe	Played Singles		Played mixed doubles only		Chinese Taipei (TPE); Ma Ying-Chieh; Huang Yuen-Yue
1993	The Hague	Played Singles		Played mixed doubles only		Finland (FIN); Pauliina Aalto; Mika Koivuniemi
1997	Lahti	Played Singles		Played mixed doubles only		Malaysia (MAS); Sharon Low; Daniel Lim
2001	Akita	Played Singles		Played mixed doubles only		Great Britain (GBR); Kirsten Penny; Steven Thornton
2005	Duisburg	Played Singles		Played mixed doubles only		France (FRA); Isabelle Saldjian; François Sacco
2009	Kaohsiung	Played Singles		Played mixed doubles only		South Korea (KOR); Gye Min-Young; Kong Byoung-Hee
2013	Cali	Played Singles		Played mixed doubles only		South Korea (KOR); Gye Min-Young; Kong Byoung-Hee
2017	Wrocław	Played Singles		Canada (CAN); François Lavoie; Dan MacLelland	Colombia (COL); Clara Guerrero; Rocio Restrepo	United States (USA); Kelly Kulick; Mike Fagan

== Professional Bowling Association World Champions ==
The PBA World Championship is one of five major PBA (Professional Bowlers Association) bowling events. The PBA World Championship has been held in a variety of formats over the years. Since the 2009–10 season, the initial qualifying scores for the World Championship have come from other stand-alone tournaments at the PBA World Series of Bowling. The current tournament is open to any PBA member who is also a competitor in the World Series of Bowling.

PBA Champions
Season	Winner	Nationality
1960	Don Carter	United States
1961	Dave Soutar	United States
1962	Carmen Salvino	United States
1963	Billy Hardwick	United States
1964	Bob Strampe	United States
1965	Dave Davis	United States
1966	Wayne Zahn	United States
1967	Dave Davis	United States
1968	Wayne Zahn	United States
1969	Mike McGrath	United States
1970	Mike McGrath	United States
1971	Mike Limongello	United States
1972	Johnny Guenther	United States
1973	Earl Anthony	United States
1974	Earl Anthony	United States
1975	Earl Anthony	United States
1976	Paul Colwell	United States
1977	Tommy Hudson	United States
1978	Warren Nelson	United States
1979	Mike Aulby	United States
1980	Johnny Petraglia	United States
1981	Earl Anthony	United States
1982	Earl Anthony	United States
1983	Earl Anthony	United States
1984	Bob Chamberlain	United States
1985	Mike Aulby	United States
1986	Tom Crites	United States
1987	Randy Pedersen	United States
1988	Brian Voss	United States
1989	Pete Weber	United States
1990	Jim Pencak	United States
1991	Mike Miller	United States
1992	Eric Forkel	United States
1993	Ron Palombi Jr.	United States
1994	Dave Traber	United States
1995	Scott Alexander	United States
1996	Butch Soper	United States
1997	Rick Steelsmith	United States
1998	Pete Weber	United States
1999	Tim Criss	United States
2000	Norm Duke	United States
2001	Walter Ray Williams Jr.	United States
2001–02	Doug Kent	United States
2002–03	Walter Ray Williams Jr.	United States
2003–04	Tom Baker	United States
2004–05	Patrick Allen	United States
2005–06	Walter Ray Williams Jr.	United States
2006–07	Doug Kent	United States
2007–08	Norm Duke	United States
2008–09	Norm Duke	United States
2009–10	Tom Smallwood	United States
2010–11	Chris Barnes	United States
2011–12	Osku Palermaa	Finland
2012–13+	Parker Bohn III	United States
2012–13+	Dominic Barrett	England
2014	Mike Fagan	United States
2015	Gary Faulkner Jr.	United States
2016	E. J. Tackett	United States
2017	Jason Belmonte	Australia
2018	Tournament not held in 2018	
2019	Jason Belmonte	Australia
2020	Jason Belmonte	Australia
2021	Tom Daugherty	United States

== World U21 Championships ==
The World U21 Championships is owned by International Bowling Federation (formerly known as World Bowling). Athletes must be under the age of 21 on the first of January of the championship year. The World Singles Championships were held for the first time in 2022, and are held every second year in odd-numbered years. Each federation is allowed to send two male and two female athletes to the championships. Singles, Doubles, Team of Four (mixed genders), All Event, and Masters are the disciplines for both genders.

=== Singles ===
World Junior Singles Champions
Year	Host	Men	Women
2022	Sweden	(Sweden) Carl Eklund	(Singapore) Colleen Pee

== World Junior Championships ==
The World Junior Championships is owned by International Bowling Federation (formerly known as World Bowling). Athletes must be under the age of 18 on the first of January of the championship year. The World Singles Championships were held for the first time in 2019, and are held every second year in odd-numbered years. Each federation is allowed to send two male and two female athletes to the championships. Singles, Doubles, Team of Four (mixed genders), All Event, and Masters are the disciplines for both genders.

=== All Events ===
World Junior All Events Champions
Year	Host	Boys	Girls
2019	France	(South Korea) Geun Ju	(Finland) Mila Nevalainen

=== Singles ===
World Junior Singles Champions
Year	Host	Men	Women
2019	France	(South Korea) Geun Ji	(Singapore) Arianne Tay

== World Youth Championships ==
The World Youth Championships is owned by International Bowling Federation (formerly known as World Bowling). Athletes must be at least 13 years old and not older than 21 years old on January 1 of the championship year. The first World Youth Championships were held in Manila, the Philippines, in 1990. The championships were first held every other year in 1990, with two girls and two boys on each team. Since 1994, each team has consisted of four girls and four boys. Since 1994 the disciplines for both genders have been Singles, Doubles, Team of Four, All Event and Masters.

=== Masters ===
World Youth Masters Champions
Year	Host	Boys	Girls
1990	Manila	(United States) Pat Healey	(South Korea) Mi-Sun Shin
1992	Caracas	(United States) Anthony Chapman	(Finland) Jaana Puhakka
1994	Monterrey	(Chinese Taipei) An-Shan Chiang	(Finland) Jaana Puhakka
1996	Hong Kong	(South Korea) Myong-Jo Kim	(Chinese Taipei) Yu-Ling Wang
1998	Incheon	(Malaysia) Alex Liew	(Chinese Taipei) Yu-Ling Wang
2000	Santo Domingo	(United States) Derek Sapp	(United States) Diandra Hyman
2002	Pattaya	(Hong Kong) Wu Siu Hong	(United States) Shannon Pluhowsky
2004	Agana	(Thailand) Yannaphon Larpapharat	(United States) Jennifer Petrick
2006	Berlin	(Norway) Mads Sandbäkken	(Malaysia) Sharon Koh
2008	Orlando	(Malaysia) Aaron Kong	(South Korea) Gwi-Ae Jun
2010	Helsinki	(South Korea) Ju-Young Kim	(South Korea) Yeon-Ju Kim
2012	Bangkok	(Sweden) Daniel Fransson	(South Korea) Yeon-Ju Hwang
2014	Hong Kong	(Sweden) Jesper Svensson	(Japan) Mirai Ishimoto
2016	Lincoln	(United States) Anthony Simonsen	(Malaysia) Natasha Roslan
2018	Detroit	(United States) Cortez Schenck	(South Korea) Lee Jungmin

=== All Events ===
World Youth All Events Champions
Year	Host	Boys	Girls
1990	Manila	(Finland) Lasse Lintilä	(United States) Lynda Norry
1992	Caracas	(Qatar) Soud Al-Hajri	(England) Emma Barlow
1994	Monterrey	(Finland) Pasi Pöllänen	(Australia) Kelly Warren
1996	Hong Kong	(Venezuela) Nicola Petrillo	(Chinese Taipei) Yu-Ling Wang
1998	Incheon	(Finland) Petteri Salonen	(Malaysia) Shalin Zulkifli
2000	Santo Domingo	(South Korea) Jae-Hoon Kim	(United States) Kelly Kulick
2002	Pattaya	(Thailand) Yannaphon Larpapharat	(Sweden) Malin Glendert
2004	Agana	(Australia) Jason Belmonte	(Finland) Minna Mäkelä
2006	Berlin	(Malaysia) Zulmazran Zulkifli	(Malaysia) Esther Cheah
2008	Orlando	(England) Dominic Barrett	(Japan) Maki Nakano
2010	Helsinki	(United States) Andrew Koff	(South Korea) Moon-Jeong Kim
2012	Bangkok	(Australia) Sam Cooley	(South Korea) Yeon-Ju Hwang
2014	Hong Kong	(United States) Wesley Low	(Japan) Shion Izumune
2016	Lincoln	(Sweden) Pontus Andersson	(United States) Gazmine Mason
2018	Detroit	(Qatar) Ghanim Aboujassoum	(Malaysia) Syazwani Sahar

=== Singles ===
World Youth Singles Champions
Year	Host	Boys	Girls
1990	Manila	(Brazil) Fernando Rezende	(Australia) Jenny Hertrick
1992	Caracas	(Philippines) Angelo Constantino	(Puerto Rico) Cristina Kortright
1994	Monterrey	(Finland) Pasi Pöllänen	(Finland) Jaana Puhakka
1996	Hong Kong	(Japan) Ito Masaru	(Colombia) Sara Vargas
1998	Incheon	(United States) Shawn Evans	(Malaysia) Shalin Zulkifli
2000	Santo Domingo	(South Korea) Jae-Hoon Kim	(United States) Kelly Kulick
2002	Pattaya	(Thailand) Yannaphon Larpapharat	(Thailand) Angkana Netruiseth
2004	Agana	(Australia) Jason Belmonte	(South Korea) Hyun-Jin Kang
2006	Berlin	(Kuwait) Mohammed Al-Zaidan	(Singapore) Valerie Teo
2008	Orlando	(England) Dominic Barrett	(South Korea) Mi-Ran Park
2010	Helsinki	(England) Adam Cairns	(South Korea) Yeon-Ju Kim
2012	Bangkok	(United States) Marshall Kent	(South Korea) Seon-Jeong Kim
2014	Hong Kong	(South Korea) Woo-Sub Choi	(South Korea) Su-Jin Yang
2016	Lincoln	(United States) Wesley Low	(United States) Gazmine Mason
2018	Detroit	(Norway) Georg Skryten	(Japan) Nanami Irie
2024	Incheon	(Germany) Paul Purps	(Singapore) Arianne Tay
2026	Kuching	(Sweden) Emil Svensson	(United States) Katelyn Abigania

=== Doubles and Team ===
The World Championships is owned by International Bowling Federation (formerly known as World Bowling). Doubles, and Team events of the World Youth Championships are listed here.

World Youth Champions in Doubles and Team
Year	Host	Doubles		Team (4 players)	
Year	Host	Boys	Girls	Mixed Team	
1990	Manila	United States: 1. Pat Healey; 2. Jon Juneau	Chinese Taipei: 1. Hui-Ying Lia; 2. Chun-Ying Yu	United States: 1. Lynda Norry; 2. Tammy Turner; 3. Pat Healey; 4. Jon Juneau	
1992	Caracas	Philippines: 1. Norberto Constantino; 2. Angelo Constantino	Venezuela: 1. Joanna Fernández; 2. Alicia Marcano	United States: 1. Tammy Turner; 2. Nikki Brandolino; 3. Robert Smith; 4. Anthony Chapman	
Year	Host	Doubles		Team (4 players)	
Year	Host	Boys	Girls	Boys	Girls
1994	Monterrey	United States: 1. Anthony Chapman; 2. Robert Smith	Australia: 1. Kelly Warren; 2. Sharon McLeish	Finland: 1. Pasi Pöllänen; 2. Tomi Väänänen; 3. Kai Siltala; 4. Juha Maja	Australia: 1. Kelly Warren; 2. Sharon McLeish; 3. Amanda Bradley; 4. Cara Honeychurch
1996	Hong Kong	Venezuela: 1. Richard León; 2. Nicola Petrillo	Japan: 1. Tomie Kawaguchi; 2. Tomomi Shibata	Chinese Taipei: 1. Chao-Sheng Cheng; 2. Chao-Yo Cheng; 3. Chin-Chung Tseng; 4. Chien-Hung Chen	Chinese Taipei: 1. Su-Fen Tseng; 2. Shu-Chun Hung; 3. Chia-Shu Wu; 4. Yu-Ling Wang
1998	Incheon	Netherlands: 1. Gerard Wijnstra; 2. Michael Sassen	United States: 1. Any Rocco; 2. Kelly Kulick	Japan: 1. Masaru Ito; 2. Yoshio Koike; 3. Hirofumi Morimoto; 4. Atsushi Takahashi	South Korea: 1. Yeau-Jin Kim; 2. Min-Hee Lee; 3. Bo-Ra Nam; 4. Jin-Hee Park
2000	Santo Domingo	South Korea: 1. Sun-Jong Kong; 2. Jae-Hoon Kim	England: 1. Lisa John; 2. Zara Glover	United States: 1. Scott Norton; 2. Nathan Bohr; 3. Derek Sapp; 4. David Haynes	South Korea: 1. Hyun-Jee Koo; 2. Ho-Jung Kim; 3. Sara Lee; 4. Myo-Bouh Jung
2002	Pattaya	South Korea: 1. Sun-Jong Kong; 2. Jae-Hoon Kim	England: 1. Donna Adams; 2. Ann Smith	Sweden: 1. Robert Andersson; 2. Mats Olsson; 3. Jonni Kemppainen; 4. Martin Larsen	England: 1. Ann Smith; 2. Donna Adams; 3. Zara Glover; 4. Lisa John
2004	Agana	Sweden: 1. Robert Andersson; 2. Mikael Kanold	Mexico: 1. Sandra Góngora; 2. Iliana Lomeli	Finland: 1. Sami Tolonen; 2. Joonas Huolman; 3. Mikko Ylitalo; 4. Osku Palermaa	United States: 1. Anita Manns; 2. Olivia Sandham; 3. Jennifer Petrick; 4. Stefanie Nation
2006	Berlin	Canada: 1. Daniel Skitt; 2. Dan MacLelland	Malaysia: 1. Zandra Aziela; 2. Esther Cheah	Australia: 1. Glen Loader; 2. Stephen Cowland; 3. Michael Zentveld; 4. Jason Belmonte	Netherlands: 1. Danielle van der Meer; 2. Wendy Kok; 3. Wendy van der List; 4. Ghislaine van der Tol
2008	Orlando	Sweden: 1. Kim Bolleby; 2. James Gruffman	Germany: 1. Tina Hulsch; 2. Birgit Pöppler	Malaysia: 1. Nur Aiman; 2. Syafiq Ridhwan; 3. Adrian Ang; 4. Aaron Kong	South Korea: 1. Yeon-Ji Lee; 2. Gwi-Ae Jun; 3. Hye-Mi Lee; 4. Mi-Ran Park
2010	Helsinki	United States: 1. Craig Hanson; 2. Andrew Koff	Colombia: 1. Laura Fonnegra; 2. María Rodrñiguez	South Korea: 1. Hae-Sol-Hong; 2. Ju-Young Kim; 3. Seung-Hyeon Shin; 4. Jong-Woo Park	South Korea: 1. Yeon-Ju Kim; 2. Bo-Hyun Shin; 3. Seung-Ja Baek; 4. Moon-Jeong Kim
2012	Bangkok	South Korea: 1. Yeon-Sang Kim; 2. Dong-Jun Hwang	South Korea: 1. Seon-Jeong Kim; 2. Yeon-Ju Hwang	United States: 1. Andrew Koff; 2. Zack Hattori; 3. Chris Via; 4. Marshall Kent	United States: 1. Jessica Earnest; 2. Kelsey Muther; 3. Amanda Greene; 4. Danielle McEwan
2014	Hong Kong	Sweden: 1. Markus Jansson; 2. Pontus Andersson	United States: 1. Lizabeth Kuhlkin; 2. Sarah Lokker	United States: 1. Matthew Farber; 2. Gregory Young; 3. Kamron Doyle; 4. Wesley Low	Japan: 1. Mirai Ishimoto; 2. Mana Yoshida; 3. Shion Izumune; 4. Kana Shimoide
2016	Lincoln	United States: 1. Wesley Low; 2. Anthony Simonsen	South Korea: 1. Yeong-Seung Lee; 2. Yu-Na Pak	United States: 1. Michael Tang; 2. Kamron Doyle; 3. Anthony Simonsen; 4. Wesley Low	South Korea: 1. Yeong-Seung Lee; 2. Yu-Na Pak; 3. Jin-Ju Kim; 4. Sun-Hwa Hong
2018	Detroit	Sweden: 1. Robert Lindberg; 2. Alfred Berggren	Mexico: 1. Paola Limón; 2. Raquel Orozco	Qatar: 1. Jassim Al Muraikhi; 2. Mohammed Al Merekhi; 3. Jassem Al Deyab; 4. Ghanim Aboujassoum	United States: 1. Caitlyn Johnson; 2. Mabel Cummins; 3. Taylor Bailey; 4. Breanna Clemmer
2024	Incheon	Germany: 1. Max Lorenz; 2. Paul Purps	Sweden: 1. Maja Engberg; 2. Nora Johansson	Czech Republic: 1. Lukáš Jelínek; 2. Ondřej Prekop; 3. Ondřej Trojek; 4. Jaroslav Zapletal	Malaysia: 1. Adelia Irwan; 2. Adania Redzwan; 3. Nur Hazirah; 4. Anis Hannani
2026	Kuching	Finland: 1. Roni Leskinen; 2. Juho Vuoppola	Malaysia: 1. Adelia Irwan; 2. Adania Redzwan	Australia: 1. Blake Walsh; 2. Jackson Buckingham; 3. Julian Dinham; 4. Nicholas Rajkovic	United States: 1. Katelyn Abigania; 2. Erin Klemencic; 3. Gianna Brandolino; 4. Elizabeth Teuber

== QubicaAMF Bowling World Cup ==
The QubicaAMF Bowling World Cup, previously known as the International Masters and AMF Bowling World Cup, is an annual championship sponsored by QubicaAMF Worldwide. Each nation chooses one male and/or one female bowler to represent them in the tournament.

Year	Location	Men	Women
1965	Dublin	(Finland) Lauri Ajanto	
1966	London	(United States) John Wilcox	
1967	Paris	(United States) Jack Connaughton	
1968	Guadalajara	(West Germany) Fritz Blum	
1969	Tokyo	(Canada) Graydon Robinson	
1970	Copenhagen	(West Germany) Klaus Müller	
1971	Hong Kong	(United States) Roger Dalkin	
1972	Hamburg	(Canada) Ray Mitchell	(Mexico) Irma Urrea
1973	Singapore	(United Kingdom) Bernie Caterer	(Thailand) Kesinee Srivises
1974	Caracas	(Colombia) Jairo Ocampo	(Denmark) Birgitte Lund
1975	Makati	(Italy) Lorenzo Monti	(Canada) Cathy Townsend
1976	Tehran	(Philippines) Paeng Nepomuceno	(United States) Lucy Giovinco
1977	Tolworth	(Norway) Arne Svein Ström	(Canada) Rea Rennox
1978	Bogotá	(Thailand) Samran Banyen	(Philippines) Lita dela Rosa
1979	Bangkok	(France) Philippe Dubois	(Philippines) Bong Coo
1980	Jakarta	(Philippines) Paeng Nepomuceno	(Canada) Jean Gordon
1981	New York	(United States) Bob Worrall	(United Kingdom) Pauline Smith
1982	Scheveningen	(Norway) Arne Svein Ström	(Australia) Jeanette Baker
1983	Mexico City	(Chinese Taipei) Chu You-tien	(Australia) Jeanette Baker
1984	Sydney	(United States) Jack Jurek	(Italy) Eliana Rigato
1985	Seoul	(Mexico) Alfonso Rodríguez	(Republic of Ireland) Marjorie McEntee
1986	Copenhagen	(Sweden) Peter Ljung	(Sweden) Annette Hagre
1987	Kuala Lumpur	(Italy) Remo Fornasari	(Netherlands) Irene Gronert
1988	Guadalajara	(United Arab Emirates) Mohammed Khalifa Al-Qubaisi	(United States) Linda Kelly
1989	Dublin	(Qatar) Salem Al-Monsuri	(United States) Patty Ann
1990	Pattaya	(Finland) Tom Hahl	(United States) Linda Graham
1991	Beijing	(United States) Jon Juneau	(Sweden) Åsa Larsson
1992	Le Mans	(Philippines) Paeng Nepomuceno	(Germany) Martina Beckel
1993	Johannesburg	(Germany) Rainer Puisis	(United Kingdom) Pauline Smith
1994	Hermosillo	(Norway) Tore Torgersen	(South Africa) Anne Jacobs
1995	São Paulo	(United States) Patrick Healey Jr.	(United Kingdom) Gemma Burden
1996	Belfast	(Philippines) Paeng Nepomuceno	(Australia) Cara Honeychurch
1997	Cairo	(Germany) Christian Nokel	(Chinese Taipei) Tseng Su-fen
1998	Kobe	(Chinese Taipei) Yang Cheng-ming	(Australia) Maxine Nable
1999	Las Vegas	(Qatar) Ahmed Shaheen	(Australia) Amanda Bradley
2000	Lisbon	(Sweden) Tomas Leandersson	(Wales) Mel Issac
2001	Pattaya	(Norway) Kim Haugen	(Japan) Nachimi Itakura
2002	Riga	(Finland) Mika Luoto	(United States) Shannon Pluhowsky
2003	Tegucigalpa	(Philippines) Christian Jan Suarez	(Canada) Kerrie Ryan-Ciach
2004	Singapore	(Finland) Kai Virtanen	(United States) Shannon Pluhowsky
2005	Ljubljana	(Canada) Michael Schmidt	(United States) Lynda Barnes
2006	Caracas	(Finland) Osku Palermaa	(United States) Diandra Asbaty
2007	St Petersburg	(United States) Bill Hoffman	(Australia) Ann-Maree Putney
2008	Hermosillo	(United States) Derek Eoff	(Singapore) Jasmine Yeong-Nathan
2009	Malacca Town	(South Korea) Choi Yong-kyu	(Canada) Caroline Lagrange
2010	Toulon	(Canada) Michael Schmidt	(Dominican Republic) Aumi Guerra
2011	Johannesburg	(Australia) Jason Belmonte	(Dominican Republic) Aumi Guerra
2012	Wrocław	(Malaysia) Syafiq Ridhwan	(Singapore) Shayna Ng
2013	Krasnoyarsk	(Israel) Or Aviram	(Canada) Caroline Lagrange
2014	Wrocław	(United States) Chris Barnes	(Colombia) Clara Guerrero
2015	Las Vegas	(Hong Kong) Wu Siu Hong	(Colombia) Clara Guerrero
2016	Shanghai	(China) Wang Hongbo	(Sweden) Jenny Wegner
2017	Hermosillo	(United States) Jakob Butturff	(Philippines) Krizziah Tabora
2018	Las Vegas	(Australia) Sam Cooley	(United States) Shannon O'Keefe
2019	Palembang	(South Africa) Francois Louw	(Australia) Rebecca Whiting

== Discontinued World Championships ==
=== World Singles Championships ===
The championships was conducted twice by World Bowling who owns the World Championships. Initially designed every fourth year, participants are two men and two women from participating nations. The first edition was held in Limassol, Cyprus in 2012, with 71 male and 57 female athletes from 40 different federations competing. The last was in Doha, Qatar with 81 male and 53 female athletes.

World Singles Championships
Year	Host	Men	Women
2012	Cyprus	(United States) Chris Barnes	(United States) Kelly Kulick
2016	Doha	(Denmark) Jesper Agerbo	(United States) Kelly Kulick

=== World Tenpin Masters ===
The World Tenpin Masters was an invitational ten-pin bowling tournament hosted by Matchroom Sport Television that ran from 1998 to 2009. Sixteen (16) bowlers are invited to compete head-to-head in a single lane in a straight knockout format.

Year	Location	Winner
1998	Adwick Leisure Centre, Doncaster	(Norway) Tore Torgersen
1999	Milton Keynes Shopping Centre	(Philippines) Paeng Nepomuceno
2000	Milton Keynes Shopping Centre	(United States) Tim Mack
2001	Goresbrook Leisure Centre, Dagenham	(Malaysia) Shalin Zulkifli
2002	Goresbrook Leisure Centre, Dagenham	(Norway) Tore Torgersen
2003	Goresbrook Leisure Centre, Dagenham	(England) Nikki Harvey
2004	Goresbrook Leisure Centre, Dagenham	(Norway) Tore Torgersen
2005	Adwick Leisure Centre, Doncaster	(Germany) Jens Nickel
2006	Barnsley Metrodome	(United States) Chris Barnes
2007	Barnsley Metrodome	(Australia) Jason Belmonte
2008	Barnsley Metrodome	(South Africa) Guy Caminsky
2009	Barnsley Metrodome	(England) Dominic Barrett

== IBSA Men's Champions ==
The following is a list of IBSA World Champions for visually impaired bowlers, sanctioned by the World Tenpin Bowling Association and International Blind Sports Association.

Year	Winner	Nationality	Classification
2008	Sid Sapru (1)	United States	
2017	Koh Young Bae	South Korea	TPB2 - MEN'S SINGLES
2017	Huang Yu-Hsiao	Chinese Taipei	TPB3 - MEN'S SINGLES
