= European Bowling Tour Masters =

EBT Masters 2007 competition logo

The European Bowling Tour (EBT) is a single tournament, with the top 16 men and top 16 women in the final standings of the European Bowling Tour being invited.

== Information ==
=== Format ===
The current format of the tournament is 3 qualification squads of 6 games each (one squad at short oil, one squad at long oil and one squad at mixed oil). The top 8 bowlers in each division will then bowl an 8-game Round Robin (on mixed oil), and the winner of this round will be crowned the 2009 EBT Masters champion.

=== Prize money ===
A prize pool of €36,000 will be provided (€18,000 for each gender) with last place in each division winning €300. Additional prize money will be given to daily squad winners and the winner of qualification.

== History ==
=== 2008 ===
The Inaugural EBT Masters was held in the Rollhouse bowling centre in Ankara, Turkey. The winners of the Event were Osku Palermaa of Finland and Kamilla Kjeldsen of Denmark.

The format for the tournament was 3 qualifying blocks of 8 games (totalling 24 games). The 1st block was bowled on Short Oil, the 2nd on long oil and the 3rd of mixed oil (long oil on the left lane and short on the right lane of every pair of lanes). The top 8 in each division after these 24 game then played a "best of 3" single elimination matchplay with the highest seed playing the lowest seed every round until the winner is decided.

==== Matchplay Results - Men ====
Seed	Player	Score	Seed	Player	Game Scores
1	(England) Dominic Barrett	1 - 2	8	(England) Paul Moor	227-205, 215-226, 226-246
2	(Finland) Osku Palermaa	2 - 0	7	(Sweden) Robert Andersson	210-179, 223-191
3	(Sweden) Dennis Eklund	1 - 2	6	(Finland) Pasi Uotila	290-238, 183-209, 182-225
4	(Sweden) Martin Larsen	1 -2	5	(Hong Kong) Wu Siu Hong	233-258, 258-181, 243-252

Seed	Player	Score	Seed	Player	Game Scores
2	(Finland) Osku Palermaa	2 - 1	8	(England) Paul Moor	196-216, 234-232, 224-197
5	(Hong Kong) Wu Sui Hong	1 - 2	6	(Finland) Pasi Uotila	257-254, 231-239, 198-278

Seed	Player	Score	Seed	Player	Game Scores
2	(Finland) Osku Palermaa	2 - 1	6	(Finland) Pasi Uotila	180-212, 220-207, 242-209

==== Matchplay Results - Women ====
Seed	Player	Score	Seed	Player	Game Scores
1	(France) Isabelle Sacco	1 - 2	8	(Denmark) Kamilla Kjeldsen	225-199, 196-214, 225-237
2	(Netherlands) Ghislaine van der Tol	1 - 2	7	(Denmark) Britt Brøndsted	234-182, 197-210, 204-222
3	(England) Kirsten Penny	2 - 1	6	(Finland) Krista Pöllänen	259-217, 188-225, 257-170
4	(Sweden) Nina Flack	1 - 2	5	(England) Zara Glover	225-196, 186-195, 190-238

Seed	Player	Score	Seed	Player	Game Scores
3	(England) Kirsten Penny	0 - 2	8	(Denmark) Kamilla Kjeldsen	233-245, 202-222
5	(England) Zara Glover	0 - 2	7	(Denmark) Britt Brøndsted	187-204, 208-226

Seed	Player	Score	Seed	Player	Game Scores
7	(Denmark) Britt Brøndsted	0 - 2	8	(Denmark) Kamilla Kjeldsen	187-188, 179-237
