= World Tenpin Bowling Championships =

International sporting event

- Status: Active
- Genre: Sports event
- Date: Midyear
- Frequency: Every 4th year
- Inaugurated: 1954
- Organiser: International Bowling Federation (IBF)

The World Tenpin Bowling Championships is a global event that invites all countries that are members of International Bowling Federation to participate.

== Event details and history ==
The first World Championships was in 1954, held in Helsinki where 58 men from 7 federations took part. The next three World Championships (1955, 1958, and 1960) only had men participating. Women first participated in the 1963 World Championships in Mexico City. From 1963 to 2003, the World Championships were conducted every fourth year.

=== Current Championships ===
As a result of the expanding number of federations competing, it was agreed in 2001 to divide the two genders in World Championships beginning in 2005. This affected the schedules for the following two 4 years cycles as follows:

- World Women Championships was conducted in 2005, 2007, 2009 and 2011.
- World Men Championships was conducted in 2006, 2008 and 2010 (2012 was moved to 2013).

World Championships for both genders were reintroduced in 2009 after a World Congress resolved to hold them every fourth year. In 2013, the inaugural edition of these so-called Combined World Championships took place. The number of teams allowed to compete in the Combined World Championships is limited to 36 teams per gender, one of which is the host federation's team, and the other 35 federations are chosen from the Zones based on the number of federations in each zone as of the qualifying date. The following are the most recent four-year World Championship cycles:

- 2018: World Men Championships
- 2019: World Women Championships
- 2021: Combined World Championships

The above-mentioned four-year cycles will be repeated for the 2022-2025 cycles, and so on.

=== Format of the games and disciplines through the years ===
==== from 1954 ====
The format for the championships has changed many times throughout its history. In the early years of the championships, men competed in four different categories: Doubles, 4-man team, 8-man team and masters. Up until 1963 women did not participate in the event. The first year that women did take part, they competed in 4 different categories, doubles, four-person team (European Style), four-person team (American Style) and masters. This is the only time the "European Style" has been used in the championships. In the following championships the European style four-person team was replaced with the five-person team event (American Style) and was used until 1979.

==== Current format and disciplines ====
Singles, Doubles, Trios, Team of Five, All Events, and Masters have been the disciplines for both genders since 1979, with 6 women and 6 men on each team. The medalists for these events except the Masters from 1979 to 2007 were determined by total pinfall.

After the conclusion of singles, doubles, trios, and five-person team events, the All Events medals are presented to the top three bowlers of both genders who have accumulated the most pinfall over the 24 games.

==== Addition of Match-Play in the finals ====
Beginning in 2008, a medal round was introduced for singles, doubles, trios, and 5 five person team event. The Medal round consisted of the top four qualifiers playing a knockout format to determine the medalists (1 vs 4 and 2 vs 3, winners of those matches face each other in the final).

The masters event has only recently changed with the onset of the championships splitting into 2 different events. Up until 2005 the top 16 would bowl a 16-game Round Robin with the top 3 bowlers after the 16 games advancing through to a stepladder final. From 2005 to 2011, the masters was played using the matchplay style, best of 5 format.

From 2013-2015, the top 24 men and women in All-Events advanced to the Masters event. All players will bowl six games with the All-Events total carried forward. The top 8 after 30 games advance to seven games of round robin match play, where 20 bonus points are awarded for a won match and 10 bonus points for a tied match. The top 4 advance to the semifinals, which is a one-game match, 1 vs 4 and 2 vs 3. The semifinal losers will earn a bronze medal. The semifinal winners advance to a one-game final match to determine gold and silver medals. In 2017, the masters format (still consisting of top 24 men and women) reverted to matchplay style, best of 3.

==== Modification in Team Event ====
Beginning in 2017, the five-person team event was modified. Qualifying was still all five players bowl ten frames each with their scores added together to determine the overall score. In the medal round, the five players bowl a best of 3 baker format, where players bowl in order one frame each (frames 1-5) and repeat the order from frames 6-10.

=== Dual pattern lane condition format ===
In 2005 the World Championships adopted the "dual pattern format" lane conditions. The two patterns are chosen from a bank of oil patterns certified by World Bowling. These oil patterns are classified as "short", "medium", and "long". Each bowler at the championships will bowl an equal number of games on the two patterns. In the masters, each match is played on alternating lane patterns with the highest seed having the choice of which pattern to start on.

The concept of having two different lane patterns is to force the bowlers to be more versatile in the championships. The two different lane patterns force the bowlers to attack each pattern from different angles, using different styles of play, such as ball speed, hand position and ball choice. It has been argued that in previous championships around the world, using one pattern for the whole event would suit certain bowlers over others, which was deemed as being unfair. It was agreed that having two different lane conditions would be a fairer way of determining the best bowlers at the championships. Many other championships around the world have also adopted this format, such as the Men's and Women's European Championships, the Asian Games, the World Ranking Masters, The Commonwealth Championships and the Asian Championships. World Bowling announced in December 2015 only one lane pattern will be used for the entirety of future World Championships, ending the dual pattern format.

== Championships ==
World Bowling Executive Board have awarded the 2021 Combined World Championships hosting rights to Kuwait. Hong Kong will host the Men's World Championships in 2018, and Las Vegas will host the Women's World Championships in 2019.

A new event, WTBA World Singles Championships for men and women, was held for the first time in Limassol, Cyprus from September 18–26, 2012, and will be held subsequently every four years. With this new event, WTBA will stage a World Championship event every year.

Number	Year	City	Country	Women	Men	Total	Events
1	1954	Helsinki	Finland	-	58	58	4
2	1955	Essen	West Germany	-	64	64	4
3	1958	Helsingborg	Sweden	-	99	99	4
4	1960	Hamburg	West Germany	-	102	102	4
5	1963	Mexico City	Mexico	45	132	177	8
6	1967	Malmö	Sweden	84	161	225	8
7	1971	Milwaukee	United States	103	268	371	8
8	1975	London	England	152	271	423	8
9	1979	Manila	Philippines	146	175	321	12
10	1983	Caracas	Venezuela	175	206	381	12
11	1987	Helsinki	Finland	196	230	426	12
12	1991	Singapore	Singapore	196	280	476	12
13	1995	Reno	United States	253	358	611	12
14	1999	Abu Dhabi	United Arab Emirates	255	345	600	12
15	2003	Kuala Lumpur	Malaysia	234	348	582	12
16	2005	Aalborg	Denmark	216	-	216	6
17	2006	Busan	South Korea	-	247	247	6
18	2007	Monterrey	Mexico	227	-	227	6
19	2008	Bangkok	Thailand	-	333	333	6
20	2009	Las Vegas	United States	228	-	228	6

Number	Year	City	Country	Women	Men	Total	Events
21	2010	Munich	Germany	-	356	356	6
22	2011	Hong Kong	Hong Kong	171	-	171	6
23	2013	Henderson	United States	212	216	428	12
24	2014	Abu Dhabi	United Arab Emirates	-	272	272	6
25	2015	Abu Dhabi	United Arab Emirates	147	-	147	6
26	2017	Las Vegas	United States	176	213	389	12
27	2018	Hong Kong	Hong Kong		265	265	6
28	2019	Las Vegas	United States	178		178	6
29	2021	Dubai	UAE	92	133	225	9

== Medals history ==
See also: List of WTBA World Tenpin Bowling Championships medalists

=== Women's medal table ===
As of 2019.

Rank	Nation	Gold	Silver	Bronze	Total
1	United States	29	26	28	83
2	South Korea	16	9	15	40
3	Sweden	8	15	10	33
4	Philippines	6	3	2	11
5	Malaysia	5	8	3	16
6	Japan	5	4	5	14
7	Australia	4	6	8	18
8	Finland	4	6	6	16
8	Germany	4	6	6	16
10	Colombia	4	4	6	14
10	Mexico	4	4	6	14
12	Chinese Taipei	4	2	4	10
13	Canada	3	4	0	7
14	Denmark	3	2	9	14
15	England	3	1	5	9
16	Singapore	2	8	7	17
17	China	1	1	0	2
18	Puerto Rico	1	0	2	3
19	Thailand	1	0	1	2
20	Venezuela	0	0	4	4
21	Hong Kong	0	0	2	2
21	Indonesia	0	0	2	2
23	Austria	0	0	1	1
23	Belgium	0	0	1	1
23	France	0	0	1	1
23	Latvia	0	0	1	1
23	South Africa	0	0	1	1
Totals (27 entries)		107	109	136	352

=== Men's medal table ===
As of 2018.

Rank	Nation	Gold	Silver	Bronze	Total
1	United States	32	26	24	82
2	Sweden	20	13	13	46
3	Finland	11	17	16	44
4	South Korea	8	7	17	32
5	Chinese Taipei	5	5	2	12
6	Canada	5	4	6	15
7	England	5	2	4	11
8	Australia	5	1	6	12
9	Netherlands	4	2	5	11
10	Mexico	3	7	7	17
11	Malaysia	3	2	2	7
12	Germany	2	5	9	16
13	Philippines	2	3	1	6
14	Belgium	2	3	0	5
15	Singapore	2	2	1	5
16	Venezuela	1	3	6	10
17	Norway	1	3	4	8
18	Colombia	1	1	4	6
18	France	1	1	4	6
20	Denmark	1	1	3	5
21	Puerto Rico	1	1	1	3
22	Hong Kong	1	1	0	2
23	Italy	1	0	1	2
23	Qatar	1	0	1	2
25	Japan	0	6	4	10
26	United Arab Emirates	0	1	3	4
27	Indonesia	0	1	0	1
28	Guam	0	0	1	1
28	Ireland	0	0	1	1
28	Kuwait	0	0	1	1
Totals (30 entries)		118	118	147	383

=== Total medal table ===
As of 2021.

Rank	Nation	Gold	Silver	Bronze	Total
1	United States	63	53	52	168
2	Sweden	27	27	22	76
3	South Korea	26	17	32	75
4	Finland	15	24	24	63
5	Australia	9	7	14	30
6	Chinese Taipei	9	7	6	22
7	Malaysia	8	10	5	23
8	Canada	8	7	7	22
9	Philippines	8	6	5	19
10	England	8	3	9	20
11	Germany	7	12	15	34
12	Mexico	7	11	13	31
13	Singapore	5	12	10	27
14	Japan	5	10	9	24
15	Colombia	5	5	11	21
16	Denmark	4	3	13	20
17	Netherlands	4	2	5	11
18	Belgium	2	3	1	6
19	Puerto Rico	2	1	3	6
20	Venezuela	1	3	10	14
21	Norway	1	3	4	8
22	France	1	1	5	7
23	Hong Kong	1	1	2	4
24	China	1	1	0	2
25	Italy	1	0	2	3
26	Qatar	1	0	1	2
26	Thailand	1	0	1	2
28	Lithuania	1	0	0	1
29	United Arab Emirates	0	1	3	4
30	Indonesia	0	1	2	3
31	Guatemala	0	1	1	2
32	Austria	0	0	1	1
32	Czech Republic	0	0	1	1
32	Guam	0	0	1	1
32	Ireland	0	0	1	1
32	Kuwait	0	0	1	1
32	Latvia	0	0	1	1
32	South Africa	0	0	1	1
Totals (38 entries)		231	232	294	757

== World Championship Records ==
=== Men ===
Category	Record	Player	Country	Event	Year/Venue
Individual Records
Individual Game	300	Rick Steelsmith	United States	Trios	1987, Helsinki, Finland
Individual Game	300	Rolando Sebelen Sr.	Dominican Republic	Doubles	1999, Abu Dhabi, UAE (United Arab Emirates)
Individual Game	300	Steve Thornton	England	Doubles	1999, Abu Dhabi, UAE (United Arab Emirates)
Individual Game	300	Andrés Gómez	Colombia	Doubles	1999, Abu Dhabi, UAE (United Arab Emirates)
Individual Game	300	Ahmed Shaheen	Qatar	Trios	1999, Abu Dhabi, UAE (United Arab Emirates)
Individual Game	300	Amedeo Spada	Italy	Singles	2003, Kuala Lumpur, Malaysia
Individual Game	300	Anders Öhman	Sweden	Doubles	2003, Kuala Lumpur, Malaysia
Individual Game	300	Darren Cundy	England	Team	2003, Kuala Lumpur, Malaysia
Individual Game	300	Kimmo Lehtonen	Finland	(Make-up) Team	2003, Kuala Lumpur, Malaysia
Individual Game	300	Martin Larsen	Sweden	Round Robin	2003, Kuala Lumpur, Malaysia
Individual Game	300	Antonis Evaggelidis	Greece	Trios	2006, Busan, South Korea
Individual Game	300	Bill Hoffman	United States	Team	2006, Busan, South Korea
Individual Game	300	Biboy Rivera	Philippines	Masters Final	2006, Busan, South Korea
Individual Game	300	Pasi Uotila	Finland	Singles	2010, Munich, Germany
Individual Game	300	Chris Barnes	United States	Singles	2010, Munich, Germany
Individual Game	300	Bodo Konieczny	Germany	Singles	2013, Henderson, United States
Individual Game	300	Luis Eduardo Rovaina	Venezuela	Singles	2013, Henderson, United States
Individual Game	300	Bill O'Neill	United States	Singles	2013, Henderson, United States
Individual Game	300	Chris Barnes	United States	Doubles	2013, Henderson, United States
Individual Game	300	Park Jong-Woo	South Korea	Doubles	2013, Henderson, United States
Individual Game	300	Tore Torgersen	Norway	Trios	2013, Henderson, United States
Individual Game	300	Achim Grabowski	Germany	Team	2013, Henderson, United States
Individual Game	300	Hareb Al-Mansoori	UAE	Team	2013, Henderson, United States
Individual Game	300	Ricardo Lecuona	Mexico	Team	2013, Henderson, United States
Individual Game	300	Wu Hao-Ming	Chinese Taipei	Singles	2017, Las Vegas, United States
Individual Game	300	Andrew Anderson	United States	Singles	2018, Hong Kong, China
Individual Game	300	Fabian Kloos	Germany	Doubles	2018, Hong Kong, China
Individual 3 Game Series	826	Kimmo Lehtonen	Finland	Singles	1999, Abu Dhabi, UAE (United Arab Emirates)
Individual 6 Game Series	1541	Jason Belmonte	Australia	Doubles	2006, Busan, South Korea
Individual 24 Game All-Events	5635	Tore Torgersen	Norway		1999, Abu Dhabi, UAE (United Arab Emirates)
Singles Records
Singles - 1 Game	300	Amedeo Spada	Italy		2003, Kuala Lumpur, Malaysia
Singles - 1 Game	300	Pasi Uotila	Finland		2010, Munich, Germany
Singles - 1 Game	300	Chris Barnes	United States		2010, Munich, Germany
Singles - 1 Game	300	Bodo Konieczny	Germany		2013, Henderson, Nevada, United States
Singles - 1 Game	300	Luis Eduardo Rovaina	Venezuela		2013, Henderson, Nevada, United States
Singles - 1 Game	300	Bill O'Neill	United States		2013, Henderson, Nevada, United States
Singles - 1 Game	300	Wu Hao-Ming	Chinese Taipei		2017, Las Vegas, United States
Singles - 1 Game	300	Andrew Anderson	United States		2018, Hong Kong, China
Singles - 3 Games	826	Kimmo Lehtonen	Finland		1999, Abu Dhabi, UAE (United Arab Emirates)
Singles - 6 Games	1524	Remy Ong	Singapore		2006, Busan, South Korea
Doubles Records
Doubles - 1 Game	599	Jaime Monroy; Andrés Gómez	Colombia		1999, Abu Dhabi, UAE (United Arab Emirates)
Doubles - 3 Games	1514	Tomas Leandersson; Anders Öhman	Sweden		2003, Kuala Lumpur, Malaysia
Doubles - 6 Games	2906	Tomas Leandersson; Anders Öhman	Sweden		2003, Kuala Lumpur, Malaysia
Trios Records
Trios - 1 Game	778	Antti-Pekka Lax; Lasse Lintilä; Ari Halme	Finland		1999, Abu Dhabi, UAE (United Arab Emirates)
Trios - 3 Games	2196	Bill O'Neill; Chris Barnes; Tommy Jones	United States		2010, Munich, Germany
Trios - 6 Games	4144	Mike Fagan; Sean Rash; Marshall Kent	United States		2014, Abu Dhabi, UAE (United Arab Emirates)
Team Records
Team - 1 Game	1309	Mario Quintero; Luis Kassian; Ricardo Lecuona; Roberto Silva; Alejandro Cruz	Mexico		2013, Henderson, Nevada, United States
Team - 3 Games	3563	Park Jong-Woo; Choi Bok-Eum; Hong Hae-Sol; Shin Seungh-Yeon; Kim Kyung-Min	South Korea		2014, Abu Dhabi, UAE (United Arab Emirates)
Team - 6 Games	6917	Park Jong-Woo; Kang Hee-Won; Choi Bok-Eum; Hong Hae-Sol; Shin Seungh-Yeon; Kim Kyung-Min	South Korea		2014, Abu Dhabi, UAE (United Arab Emirates)

=== Women ===
Category	Record	Player	Country	Event	Year/Venue
Individual Records
Individual Game	300	Cha Mi-Jung	South Korea	Trios	1999, Abu Dhabi, UAE (United Arab Emirates)
Individual Game	300	Kim Yeau-Jin	South Korea	Doubles	2007, Monterrey, Mexico
Individual Game	300	Kirsten Penny	England	Team	2007, Monterrey, Mexico
Individual Game	300	María Rodríguez	Colombia	Doubles	2009, Las Vegas, United States
Individual Game	300	Kelly Kulick	United States	Singles	2011, Hong Kong, China
Individual Game	300	Caroline Lagrange	Canada	Trios	2011, Hong Kong, China
Individual Game	300	Shannon O'Keefe	United States	Trios	2011, Hong Kong, China
Individual Game	300	Britt Brøndsted	Denmark	Team	2011, Hong Kong, China
Individual Game	300	Shayna Ng	Singapore	Masters 1st Round	2011, Hong Kong, China
Individual Game	300	Shannon Pluhowsky	United States	Masters Finals	2011, Hong Kong, China
Individual Game	300	Kelly Kulick	United States	Doubles Semifinals	2013, Henderson, United States
Individual Game	300	Joan Gonzalez	Venezuela	Doubles	2015, Abu Dhabi, UAE (United Arab Emirates)
Individual Game	300	Karen Marcano	Venezuela	Team	2015, Abu Dhabi, UAE (United Arab Emirates)
Individual Game	300	Liz Johnson	United States	Team Finals	2015, Abu Dhabi, UAE (United Arab Emirates)
Individual Game	300	Liz Johnson	United States	Masters Step 2	2015, Abu Dhabi, UAE (United Arab Emirates)
Individual Game	300	Danielle McEwan	United States	Masters Step 2	2015, Abu Dhabi, UAE (United Arab Emirates)
Individual 3 Game Series	812	Jacqueline Sijore	Malaysia	Singles	2011, Hong Kong, China
Individual 6 Game Series	1601	Shayna Ng	Singapore	Singles	2011, Hong Kong, China
Individual 24 Game All-Events	5744	Mai Ginge Jensen	Denmark		2011, Hong Kong, China
Singles Records
Singles - 1 Game	300	Kelly Kulick	United States		2011, Hong Kong, China
Singles - 3 Games	812	Jacqueline Sijore	Malaysia		2011, Hong Kong, China
Singles - 6 Games	1601	Shayna Ng	Singapore		2011, Hong Kong, China
Doubles Records
Doubles - 1 Game	556	Carolyn Dorin-Ballard; Kelly Kulick	United States		2011, Hong Kong, China
Doubles - 3 Games	1536	Carolyn Dorin-Ballard; Kelly Kulick	United States		2011, Hong Kong, China
Doubles - 6 Games	2901	Carolyn Dorin-Ballard; Kelly Kulick	United States		2011, Hong Kong, China
Trios Records
Trios - 1 Game	802	Stefanie Nation; Shannon Pluhowsky; Shannon O'Keefe	United States		2011, Hong Kong, China
Trios - 3 Games	2165	Esther Cheah; Zandra Aziela; Jacqueline Sijore	Malaysia		2011, Hong Kong, China
Trios - 6 Games	4232	Hwang Sun-Ok; Jeon Eun-Hee; Son Yun-Hee	South Korea		2011, Hong Kong, China
Team Records
Team - 1 Game	1262	Nadine Geisler; Vanessa Timter; Juliane Rieger; Birgit Pöppler; Patricia Luoto	Germany		2011, Hong Kong, China
Team - 3 Games	3491	Stefanie Nation; Missy Parkin; Shannon O'Keefe; Kelly Kulick; Liz Johnson	United States		2013, Henderson, United States
Team - 3 Games	3491	Jeon Eun-Hee; Son Hye-Rin; Kim Jin-Sun; Jung Da-Wun; Baek Seung-Ja	South Korea		2015, Abu Dhabi, UAE (United Arab Emirates)
Team - 6 Games	6750	Nadine Geisler; Vanessa Timter; Juliane Rieger; Janine Ribguth; Birgit Pöppler; Patricia Luoto	Germany		2011, Hong Kong, China
Team - 6 Games	6750	Missy Parkin; Liz Kuhlkin; Jordan Richard; Stefanie Johnson; Danielle McEwan; Shannon O'Keefe	United States		2019, Las Vegas, United States

== See also ==
- World Bowling Singles Championships
- World Ninepin Bowling Championships
- PBA World Championship
- QubicaAMF Bowling World Cup
- WTBA World Juniors Tenpin Bowling Championships
- Asian Tenpin Bowling Championships
- African Tenpin Bowling Championships
- Pan American Tenpin Bowling Championships
- European Tenpin Bowling Championships
- European Bowling Tour
- World Ranking Masters
- World Tenpin Masters
- Mediterranean Challenge Cup
