= European Bowling Tour =

Ten-pin bowling tour

- Sport: Bowling
- Founded: 2000; 26 years ago
- Continent: Europe
- Most recent champions: William Svensson and Joline Persson-Planefors (2020–2021)
- Website: European Bowling Tour

The European Bowling Tour (EBT) is one of three tenpin bowling tours (Europe, Americas, Asia) that form part of the ranking system of the World Tenpin Bowling Association (WTBA).

The tour is run by the European Tenpin Bowling Federation. In all the tournaments, men and women compete alongside each other, with women receiving a handicap per game. In these tournaments there is only one prize fund (not split for men & women), however some tournaments offer additional bonuses for the highest placed woman, which is often in addition to any of the regular prize money.

== History ==
During the 1990s, there had been several attempts to develop Ten-pin bowling tours in Europe but these were usually limited to one country (The Danish Masters Tour and the German Golden Bowling Ball Tour). It wasn't until 2000 that the European Bowling Tour was launched initially holding 9 tournaments in 8 countries. It has since expanded over the course of 19 years and now consists of 13 events in 2019. The Brunswick Ballmaster Open in Helsinki is the only tournament having joined the tour since the beginning in 2000.

== Tour ==
The format varies from tournament to tournament, but generally most tournaments on the EBT take the form of 6 games re-entry qualification, with the top 50–60 bowlers (depending on the tournament) bowling a further set of games (most commonly 4), before a final cut to either single elimination matchplay or stepladder finals.

=== 2017 ===
Stop	Country	City	Event	Champion (Men)	Champion (Ladies)
1	Finland	Helsinki	Brunswick Ballmaster Open	Carsten W. Hansen	Daphne Tan (C)
2	Ireland	Dublin	Storm Irish Open	Tore Torgersen (C)	Keira Reay
3	Germany	Munich	Brunswick Euro Challenge	Dominic Barrett (C)	Birgit Pöppler
4	Denmark	Aalborg	Kegel Aalborg International	Mattias Wetterberg (C)	Jenny Wegner
5	Spain	Madrid	V Brunswick Madrid Challenge	François Lavoie (C)	Jo Allesbrook
6	San Marino	Serravalle	13th Storm San Marino Open	François Lavoie (C)	Jenny Wegner
7	Germany	Munich	Track Dream Bowl Palace Open	Pontus Andersson (C)	Vanessa Timter
8	Sweden	Malmö	Storm Lucky Larsen Masters	Jason Belmonte (C)	Britt Brønsted
9	Denmark	Odense	Odense International	Lars Nielsen (C)	Sanna Pasanen
10	Netherlands	The Hague	Scheveningen Dutch Open	Richard Teece	Nicole Sanders (C)
11	Norway	Oslo	Norwegian Open by Brunswick	Raymond Jansson (C)	Jenny Karlsson

=== 2018 ===
Stop	Country	City	Event	Champion (Men)	Champion (Ladies)
1	Sweden	Stockholm	38th AIK International Tournament	Jesper Svensson	Bernice Lim (C)
2	Finland	Helsinki	Brunswick Ballmaster Open	Kimmo Lehtonen	Li Jane Sin (C)
3	Ireland	Dublin	Storm Irish Open	Anthony Simonsen (C)	Nicole Sanders
4	Germany	Munich	Brunswick Euro Challenge	Anthony Simonsen	Jenny Wegner (C)
5	Netherlands	Tilburg	Hammer Bronzen Schietspoel	Gaëtan Mouveroux	Cajsa Wegner
6	Spain	Madrid	VI Brunswick Madrid Challenge	Thomas Larsen	María Rodríguez
7	San Marino	Serravalle	14th Storm San Marino Open	Pontus Andersson	Mai Ginge Jensen
8	Germany	Munich	Track Dream Bowl Palace Open	Jesper Agerbo	Maxime de Rooij
9	Sweden	Malmö	Storm Lucky Larsen Masters	Kyle Troup	Sandra Gongora
10	Denmark	Odense	Odense International	Arnar Davið Jónsson (C)	Mai Ginge Jensen
11	Italy	Rome	Rome Open	Oliver Morig (C)	Mai Ginge Jensen
12	Norway	Oslo	Norwegian Open by Brunswick	Eric Sjöberg (C)	Wendy Bartaire

=== 2019 ===
Stop	Country	City	Event	Champion (Men)	Champion (Ladies)
1	Sweden	Stockholm	39th AIK International Tournament	Kim Bolleby (C)	Cherie Tan
2	Finland	Helsinki	Brunswick Ballmaster Open	Joonas Jehkinen (C)	Cherie Tan
3	Ireland	Dublin	Storm Irish Open	Jamie Elliott (C)	Denise Blankenzee
4	Netherlands	Tilburg	Hammer Bronzen Schietspoel	Hadley Morgan (C)	Anna Andersson
5	Germany	Munich	16th Brunswick Euro Challenge	Martin Larsen (C)	María Rodríguez
6	Spain	Madrid	VII Brunswick Madrid Challenge	Adam Andersson (C)	Siti Safiyah Amirah
7	San Marino	Serravalle	15th Storm San Marino Open	Daniel Fransson (C)	Anna Andersson
8	Germany	Munich	Track Dream Bowl Palace Open	Arnar Davið Jónsson (C)	Nicole Sanders
9	Denmark	Odense	Odense International	Stephan Unger (C)	Megan Gales Dicay
10	Greece	Thessaloniki	Dimitris Karetsos Tournament	Montsenigos Eleytherios	Cynthia Duca (C)
11	France	Wittelsheim	3rd Brunswick Open	Mikkel Sörensen (C)	Alexandra Lopes D’Andrade
12	Norway	Oslo	Norwegian Open by Brunswick	James Blomgren (C)	Mai Ginge Jensen
13	Denmark	Aalborg	Kegel Aalborg International 2019	Arnar Davið Jónsson (C)	Birgit Pöppler

=== 2020 ===
Stop	Country	City	Event	Champion (Men)	Champion (Ladies)
1	Sweden	Stockholm	40th AIK International Tournament	Christopher Sloan (C)	Joline Person Planefors
2	Finland	Helsinki	50th Brunswick Ballmaster Open	Nathan Ruest Lajoie (C)	Birgit Pöppler
3	Ireland	Dublin	32nd Storm Irish Open	Nicola Pongolini (C)	Carol Catchpole
4	Netherlands	Tilburg	Hammer Bronzen Schietspoel	Mathias Ankerdal (C)	Cajsa Wegner
5	Germany	Munich	17th Brunswick Euro Challenge		
6	Germany	Langen	BOWL for Fun Open Tournament		
7	Spain	Madrid	VIII Brunswick Madrid Challenge		
8	San Marino	Serravalle	16th Storm San Marino Open		
9	Germany	Munich	Track Dream Bowl Palace Open		
10	Denmark	Odense	Odense International		
11	Greece	Thessaloniki	Dimitris Karetsos Tournament		
12	France	Wittelsheim	4th Brunswick Open		
13	Norway	Oslo	Norwegian Open by Brunswick		
14	Denmark	Aalborg	Kegel Aalborg International 2020		
15	Sweden		Leandersson Christmas Tournament		

== Previous Ranking Winners ==
Ranking winners of the European Bowling Tour, since 2000

Year	Men	Ladies
2000	Gery Verbruggen	Kamilla Kjeldsen
2001	Gery Verbruggen	Bettina Lund
2002	Gery Verbruggen	Bettina Lund
2003	Gery Verbruggen	Kamilla Kjeldsen
2004	Paul Moor	Britt Brøndsted
2005	Paul Moor	Britt Brøndsted
2006	Paul Moor	Britt Brøndsted
2007	Osku Palermaa	Kirsten Penny
2008	Osku Palermaa	Nina Flack
2009	Osku Palermaa	Nicki Ainge
2010	Dominic Barrett	Nina Flack
2011	Osku Palermaa	Joline Persson-Planefors
2012	Dominic Barrett	Birgit Pöppler
2013	Dominic Barrett	Joline Persson-Planefors
2014	Thomas Larsen	Kamilla Kjeldsen
2015	Jesper Svensson	Jenny Wegner
2016	Richard Teece	Laura Beuthner
2017	Carsten W. Hansen	Jenny Wegner
2018	Anthony Simonsen	Jenny Wegner
2019	Arnar Davið Jónsson	Anna Andersson
2020–2021 (Note: 2020 and 2021 EBT season was affected by the COVID-19 pandemic. Only 8 events took place.)	William Svensson	Joline Persson-Planefors

== EBT Masters ==
The EBT Masters is played at a different host centre each year, usually before/after the EBT event in the same location.

Previously, qualification for this event is the top 12 men and top 12 women from the previous year's EBT ranking. Now its top 8 and top 8 women from previous years EBT ranking.

Previously, the format was a Round Robin consisting of 11 rounds of one game matches. 20 bonus points are awarded for each match won, 10 for drawn matches. The top 3 bowlers after the round robin qualify for a 3-person stepladder to determine the winner of the masters.

In 2019, top 8 men and top 8 women after conclusion of the European Bowling Tour 2018 qualified for the 2019 EBT Masters. The format is 8 games total pinfall, top 4 advance to bowl another 4 games, pinfall carrying over. Total pinfall after 12 games determined the EBT Masters champions.

The 2022 edition was the final of the EBT 2020+2021 combined. Eight men, ranging from rank 1 to 15 and seven women competed due to prior commitments.

=== Previous results ===
Year	Venue	Champion (Men)	Runner-up (Men)	Champion (Ladies)	Runner-up (Ladies)
2008	Rollhouse Bowling Centre, Ankara, Turkey	Osku Palermaa	Pasi Uotila	Kamilla Kjeldsen	Britt Brøndsted
2009	Lövvang Bowling Centre, Aalborg, Denmark	Paul Moor	Jason Belmonte	Kamilla Kjeldsen	Rikke Holm Rasmussen
2010	Lövvang Bowling Centre, Aalborg, Denmark	Robert Andersson	Tore Torgersen	Kamilla Kjeldsen	Mai Ginge Jensen
2011	Bowling Centre Gladiator, Ljubljana, Slovenia	Mika Koivuniemi	Martin Larsen	Cherie Tan	Mai Ginge Jensen
2012	Dream Bowl Palace, Unterföhring, Germany	Martin Larsen	Mika Koivuniemi	Rebecka Larsen	Clara Guerrero
2013	BNC Bowling Centre, Bratislava, Slovakia	Tony Ranta	Martin Larsen	Lisanne Breeschoten	Ida Andersson
2014	Dolfijn Bowling, Tilburg, Netherlands	Pasi Uotila	Martin Larsen	Mai Ginge Jensen	Birgit Pöppler
2015	Bowling Chamartín, Madrid, Spain	Paul Moor	Jesper Svensson	Laura Beuthner	Diana Zavjalova
2016	Rose'n Bowl, Serravalle, San Marino	Stuart Williams	Jesper Svensson	Sin Li Jane	Birgit Pöppler
2017	Lövvang Bowling Centre, Aalborg, Denmark	Paul Moor	Osku Palermaa	Joline Persson-Planefors	Jenny Wegner
2018	Dolfijn Bowling, Tilburg, Netherlands	Pontus Andersson	Richard Teece	Jenny Wegner	Sanna Pasanen
2019	Bowling Chamartín, Madrid, Spain	Muhammad Rafiq Ismail	Kyle Troup	Sin Li Jane	Mai Ginge Jensen
2020	Lövvang Bowling Centre, Aalborg, Denmark	Kim Bolleby	Martin Larsen	Cajsa Wegner	Mai Ginge Jensen
2022 (Note: EBT Masters 2022 was the final of the EBT 2020–2021 seasons combined.)	Dream Bowl Palace, Unterföhring, Germany	Jesse Kallio	Christopher Sloan	Bernice Lim	Cajsa Wegner
