= Bowling at the 2001 World Games – Mixed doubles =

Bowling mixed doubles at the World Games
- Venue: Utenayu Bowl
- Date: 21–22 August 2001
- Competitors: 48 from 23 nations

Medalists
1st place, gold medalist(s)		Steve Thornton; Kirsten Penny
2nd place, silver medalist(s)		Tobias Gäbler; Tanya Petty
3rd place, bronze medalist(s)		Petter Hansen; Mette Hansen

The mixed doubles event in bowling at the 2001 World Games took place from 21 to 22 August 2001 at the Utenayu Bowl in Yokote, Japan.

== Competition format ==
A total of 24 pairs entered the competition. Best three duets from preliminary round qualifies to the finals.

== Results ==
=== Preliminary ===
Rank	Athletes	Nation	Result	Note
1	Steve Thornton; Kirsten Penny	(United Kingdom) Great Britain	2584	Q
2	Petter Hansen; Mette Hansen	Norway	2556	Q
3	Tobias Gäbler; Tanya Petty	Germany	2552	Q
4	Tom Hahl; Piritta Kantola	Finland	2490	
5	Andrés Gómez; Clara Guerrero	Colombia	2482	
6	Constantine Ko King; Cecilia Yap	Philippines	2461	
7	Masaaki Takemoto; Kaori Daimaruya	Japan	2458	
8	François Sacco; Isabelle Saldjian	France	2426	
9	Ron van den Boogaard; Ross Greiner	Netherlands	2403	
9	José Lander; Inngellimar Contreras	Venezuela	2403	
11	Tony Manna Jr. Shannon Pluhowsky	United States	2401	
12	Kim Kyung-min; Nam Bo-ra	South Korea	2388	
13	George Lambert; Jennifer Willis	Canada	2373	
14	Tseng Sheng-hsien; Wang Yu-ling	Chinese Taipei	2357	
15	Kenny Ang; Shalin Zulkifli	Malaysia	2334	
16	Frank Russo; Felicidad Mandapat	Guam	2311	
17	Wu Siu Hong; Vanessa Fung	Hong Kong	2294	
18	Nelson Toro; Miriam Ayala	Puerto Rico	2286	
19	Diego Fernandez; Sofía Rodríguez	Guatemala	2272	
20	Remy Ong; Leng Tan Bee	Singapore	2193	
21	Rolando Sebelen; Aumi Guerra	Dominican Republic	2162	
22	Ronald Chamberlain; Susan Thomas	(United Kingdom) Great Britain	2063	
23	Raul Chang; Tatiana Valdes	Peru	1949	
24	Adriano Santi; Gabriella Casadei	San Marino	1895	

=== Finals ===
Semifinal			Final
			1	(United Kingdom) Steve Thornton (United Kingdom) Kirsten Penny	834
3	(Germany) Tobias Gäbler (Germany) Tanya Petty	364	3	(Germany) Tobias Gäbler (Germany) Tanya Petty	763
2	(Norway) Petter Hansen (Norway) Mette Hansen	348
