= Cass Edwards =

British tenpin bowler and sports broadcaster

Cass Edwards is a UK-based retired tenpin bowler turned sports broadcaster and journalist. He has been a play by play colour commentator for ten-pin bowling since 2001, covering international bowling events including the Weber Cup, World Tenpin Masters WTBA World Championships and the AMF Bowling World Cup, with many hundreds of hours of TV commentary on the sport he played for over 40 years starting in the 1960s.

A former Great Britain International bowler and World Championship bronze medal winner, he has also been featured as colour commentator for the U.S. Professional Bowlers Association tour telecasts on Eurosport TV and Skysports TV in the UK.
