= World Tenpin Masters =

Ten-pin bowling tournament

The World Tenpin Masters (founded in 1998) is an annual tenpin bowling tournament. It consists of a single lane surrounded by banked seating on both sides to give the event the kind of high-pressure atmosphere that makes the Masters the world’s leading televised bowling tournament.

The event is televised by Matchroom Sport Television and will be subsequently broadcast as 15 x 1 hour programmes both at home on Sky Sports and around the world.

== History ==
It is second to and starts where the Weber Cup left off. It features 16 of the world’s best bowlers, representing twelve countries, going head-to-head in a straight knockout format. Each match is played over two games with the bowler with the highest aggregate (highest total pinfall) over the two games determining the winner and proceeding. It stands next to the Weber Cup and AMF World Cup as one of the world’s largest annual international sports Ten-pin bowling championships in terms of number of participating nations. In 2009/10 18-year-old Daniel Spencer & 19-year-old Matt Chamberlain of England became the youngest ever qualifiers of the event after winning the PTBC 2008/09 Tournaments.

All tournament officials are supplied by the British Tenpin Bowling Association.

== 2008 Tournament ==
The 2008 World Tenpin Masters was held at the Barnsley Metrodome from April 18 to April 20 and featured 16 of the top male and female bowlers from around the world.

=== Tournament Format ===
Round of 16
18 April, 7pm
(Australia) Jason Belmonte	406
(England) James Tidd	469
18 April, 8pm
(Netherlands) Ghislaine van der Tol	370
(South Africa) Guy Caminsky	444
18 April, 9pm
(England) Paul Moor	453
(Malaysia) Alex Liew	401
19 April, 2pm
(England) Dominic Barrett	492
(Philippines) Biboy Rivera	458
19 April, 3pm
(Canada) Michael Schmidt	461
(Finland) Osku Palermaa	516
19 April, 4pm
(England) Stuart Williams	398
(United States) Diandra Asbaty	393
19 April, 7pm
(England) Kirsten Penny	504
(Indonesia) Ryan Lalisang	480
19 April, 8pm
(Israel) Or Aviram	405
(United States) Chris Barnes	449

Quarter-finals
19 April, 9pm
(England) James Tidd	428
(South Africa) Guy Caminsky	449
20 April, 1pm
(England) Paul Moor	516
(England) Dominic Barrett	473
20 April, 2pm
(Finland) Osku Palermaa	467
(England) Stuart Williams	445
20 April, 3pm
(England) Kirsten Penny	546
(United States) Chris Barnes	569

Semi-finals
20 April, 6pm
(South Africa) Guy Caminsky	507
(England) Paul Moor	480
20 April, 7pm
(Finland) Osku Palermaa	462
(United States) Chris Barnes	521

Final
20 April, 8pm
(South Africa) Guy Caminsky	526
(United States) Chris Barnes	517

=== Prize Fund ===
- Winner US$30,000
- Runner–Up US$10,000
- Losing Semi-Finalists US$5,000
- Losing Quarter Finalists US$2,000
- First Round Losers US$1,500
- TOTAL US$70,000

== Past Tournaments ==
Previous Finals

Year	Location	Winner	Score	Runner-up
1998	Goresbrook Leisure Centre, Dagenham	(Norway) Tore Torgersen	432 - 395	(Sweden) Tomas Leandersson
1999	Milton Keynes Shopping Centre	(Philippines) Paeng Nepomuceno	422 - 402	(England) Steve Thornton
2000	Milton Keynes Shopping Centre	(United States) Tim Mack	438 - 436	(Norway) Tore Torgersen
2001	Goresbrook Leisure Centre, Dagenham	(Malaysia) Shalin Zulkifli	455 - 450	(Norway) Tore Torgersen
2002	Goresbrook Leisure Centre, Dagenham	(Norway) Tore Torgersen	465 - 449	(United States) Tim Mack
2003	Goresbrook Leisure Centre, Dagenham	(England) Nikki Harvey	431 - 402	(Australia) Andrew Frawley
2004	Goresbrook Leisure Centre, Dagenham	(Norway) Tore Torgersen	436 - 415	(Sweden) Tomas Leandersson
2005	Adwick Leisure Centre, Doncaster	(Germany) Jens Nickel	485 - 389	(England) Paul Moor
2006	Barnsley Metrodome	(United States) Chris Barnes	458 - 437	(England) Paul Moor
2007	Barnsley Metrodome	(Australia) Jason Belmonte	566 - 524	(England) Paul Moor
2008	Barnsley Metrodome	(South Africa) Guy Caminsky	526 - 517	(United States) Chris Barnes
2009	Barnsley Metrodome	(England) Dominic Barrett	503 - 424	(Australia) Jason Belmonte
