= Thomas Larsen (bowler) =

Danish professional ten-pin bowler

Thomas Larsen (born 18 November 1989) is a Danish professional ten-pin bowler competing on the PBA Tour, World Bowling Tour and European Bowling Tour. He has won three titles on the PBA Tour (including one major championship) and five titles on the EBT, having been the EBT rankings winner in 2014. He represented Europe at the 2020 and 2021 Weber Cup events.

Larsen's first two PBA Tour titles came in international events, at the 2013 Abu Dhabi World Bowling Tour championship and the 2014 Kuwait International Open. On 4 April 2021, Larsen won his first PBA major title at the USBC Masters in Reno, Nevada. Qualifying as the #2 seed, he defeated American Spencer Robarge in the semifinal match, then defeated top seed Jesper Svensson of Sweden in an all-Scandinavia final match, 197–176. Based on points earned through the first nine events of the 2021 PBA season, Larsen qualified as the #9 seed for the PBA Tour Playoffs. He advanced to the Round of 8 before being eliminated by top seed Kyle Troup.

He was a member of the Las Vegas High Rollers PBA Elite League team, which won the Elias Cup championship in 2024.

Larsen is a member of the 900 Global pro staff as of 2026.

Larsen has a BA in marketing and is from in da:Skanderup, He's recently married and has two children. Outside of professional bowling competition, he is a bowling coach and works in a local pro shop in Odense.

== PBA Tour titles ==
Major championships are in bold type.

- 2013 Abu Dhabi World Bowling Tour (defeated Mika Koivuniemi in the final, 247–204)
- 2014 Kuwait International Open (defeated Dominic Barrett in the final, 208–205)
- **2021 USBC Masters** (defeated Jesper Svensson in the final, 197–176)
- 2024 — PBA Elite League Elias Cup, Portland, Maine
