= World Bowling Singles Championships =

International Bowling Competition

The World Bowling Singles Championships is a Ten-pin bowling event open to members of World Bowling. This gives World Bowling a World Championship event every year, filling a void left from previous years. Each member federation can send up to two men and two women to compete. The event is split up into two separate tournaments, one for men and one for women.

== Event details and history ==
The first WB Singles Championships was held on September 18–26, 2012 in Limassol, Cyprus at the Galactica Bowling Center and subsequently will be held every four years. The second edition was held December 2–9, 2016 at Qatar Bowling Center in Doha. The third edition was to be held at South Point Tournament Bowling Plaza in Las Vegas, United States in 2020. On March 9, 2020, World Bowling and QubicaAMF announced a merger of the World Singles Championships and the QubicaAMF Bowling World Cup into one annual event, to be continued to be called the QubicaAMF Bowling World Cup from 2020 onwards

=== Format ===
In the 2012 WB Singles Championships, each bowler (men and women) bowled 12 games of qualifying split into two six game blocks. The top 24 men and women, by total pinfall, advanced to single-elimination match play. The first round of match play consisted of bowlers who qualified 9th to 24th. The second round of match play consisted of the first round winners and bowlers who qualified 1st to 8th who received a first round bye. Quarterfinals consisted of second round winners. First round, second round, and quarterfinals were best of five game matches. Quarterfinal winners advanced to the semi-finals, which were one game matches. Semi-final winners advanced to the finals, while semifinal losers receive a bronze medal. The finals is a one-game match to determine the gold medalist and the silver medalist for both the men and women.

For the 2016 WB Singles Championships, WB announced changes to the qualifying round and the final rounds. The qualifying rounds are still 12 games, but now split into three four game blocks. The top 32 men and women, by total pinfall, advanced to the next round. Instead of single-elimination match play, the next round has 32 bowlers (men and women) divided into four groups of eight bowlers bowling eight games starting from scratch. Each of the eight games is a match between all the bowlers in the group, with the bowler who had the highest score receiving seven points, second highest score receiving six points all the way to zero points for the lowest score in the game. The two bowlers with the highest number of points after eight games from each of the four groups will advance to play in one group of eight bowlers with a similar format from the previous round. After eight games in the final group, the top 4 point scorers will advance to the semi-finals. The semi-finals are one-game matches, no. 1 point scorer vs no. 4 point scorer and no. 2 point scorer vs no. 3 point scorer. The semi-final winners advance to the final, while the semi-final losers receive a bronze medal. The finals, also one-game matches, determines the gold and silver medalists.

=== Lane Pattern ===
All games in WB Singles Championships are played on one lane condition. In 2012, a medium pattern of 41 feet was used. In 2016, a medium pattern of 40 feet was chosen.

== Championships ==
| Number | Year | City | Country | Men | Women | Total | Events |
|---|---|---|---|---|---|---|---|
| 1 | 2012 | Limassol | Cyprus | 71 | 57 | 128 | 2 |
| 2 | 2016 | Doha | Qatar | 81 | 53 | 134 | 2 |

== Medal History ==
=== Men's Medal table ===
| Rank | Nation | Gold | Silver | Bronze | Total |
|---|---|---|---|---|---|
| 1 | United States (USA) | 1 | 1 | 0 | 2 |
| 2 | Denmark (DEN) | 1 | 0 | 0 | 1 |
| 3 | Malaysia (MAS) | 0 | 1 | 0 | 1 |
| 4 | Finland (FIN) | 0 | 0 | 2 | 2 |
| 5 | Colombia (COL) | 0 | 0 | 1 | 1 |
| 5 | Hong Kong (HKG) | 0 | 0 | 1 | 1 |
| Totals (6 entries) | | 2 | 2 | 4 | 8 |

=== Women's medal table ===
| Rank | Nation | Gold | Silver | Bronze | Total |
|---|---|---|---|---|---|
| 1 | United States (USA) | 2 | 0 | 1 | 3 |
| 2 | Singapore (SIN) | 0 | 1 | 1 | 2 |
| 3 | Latvia (LAT) | 0 | 1 | 0 | 1 |
| 4 | Malaysia (MAS) | 0 | 0 | 1 | 1 |
| 4 | Mexico (MEX) | 0 | 0 | 1 | 1 |
| Totals (5 entries) | | 2 | 2 | 4 | 8 |

== Medal Winners ==
=== Men ===
| Games | Gold | Silver | Bronze |
|---|---|---|---|
| 2012 Limassol | (United States) Chris Barnes | (United States) Tommy Jones | (Colombia) Andrés Gómez |
| 2012 Limassol | (United States) Chris Barnes | (United States) Tommy Jones | (Finland) Osku Palermaa |
| 2016 Doha | (Denmark) Jesper Agerbo | (Malaysia) Rafiq Ismail | (Finland) Joonas Jähi |
| 2016 Doha | (Denmark) Jesper Agerbo | (Malaysia) Rafiq Ismail | (Hong Kong) Michael Mak |

=== Women ===
| Games | Gold | Silver | Bronze |
|---|---|---|---|
| 2012 Limassol | (United States) Kelly Kulick | (Latvia) Diana Zavjalova | (Malaysia) Esther Cheah |
| 2012 Limassol | (United States) Kelly Kulick | (Latvia) Diana Zavjalova | (Mexico) Aseret Zetter |
| 2016 Doha | (United States) Kelly Kulick | (Singapore) New Hui Fen | (Singapore) Shayna Ng |
| 2016 Doha | (United States) Kelly Kulick | (Singapore) New Hui Fen | (United States) Shannon Pluhowsky |

== See also ==
- WTBA World Tenpin Bowling Championships
