= Tim Mack =

Tim Mack may refer to:

- Timothy Mack, American pole vaulter
- Tim Mack (bowler), American ten-pin bowler
