= Weber Cup =

Men's bowling competition between Europe and the United States

The Weber Cup Logo

The Weber Cup is an annual men's ten-pin bowling competition between Team Europe and Team USA, named after professional ten-pin bowler Dick Weber. It is often referred to as "bowling's equivalent of golf's Ryder Cup". Teams of five from the United States and from Europe compete over three days. The tournament includes a series of single, double, and team (baker) matches.

== History and background ==
The Weber Cup championship begins every year in October. The inaugural event was held in 2000 in Warsaw, Poland. All matches are played in a single lane arena, constructed for the event, with banked spectators on both sides. The Weber Cup is shown live on Sky Sports in the UK and on many other international channels around the world.

During the first seven events, from 2000 to 2006, 35 matches were played. Each match is worth one point, and the first team to obtain 18 points wins the tournament. From 2007 onward, the competition has included 33 matches, and the first team to receive 17 points wins the tournament.

=== 2003 ===
The United States had won the first three competitions from 2000 to 2002. In 2003, missing their captain Tim Mack, the United States lost the lead to the Europeans early on day one and never recovered it. Team Europe, led by captain Tomas Leandersson, won the Weber Cup for the first time in November 2003.

=== 2004 ===
Following Europe's recent success in the Ryder Cup earlier in the year, the European ten-pin bowling team went on to a second victory in the Weber Cup at the Altrincham Leisure Centre. Team USA maintained a one-point lead at 11–10 after the first two days of play, but Team Europe pulled away on the third day to secure a final score of 18-11.

=== 2005 ===
In 2005, the Europeans fell behind 14–16, but during the final session of play they won the first 4 singles games. Europe took the title for the third successive year, with a final score of 18–16. As in the previous year, Team Europe captain, Tomas Leandersson won the final point over Team USA's Tony Manna Jr.

=== 2006 ===
In the closest tournament to date; Team USA won on the final evening of the contest, by 18–17.

Team Europe's Paul Moor bowled the first perfect game in the Weber Cup to start the competition against Jason Couch, but by the end of the first day, Team USA led 4–2. The other European win in the first session came from Tomas Leandersson against Chris Barnes. Tommy Jones defeated Mika Koivuniemi, Tim Mack beat Tore Torgersen, Bill Hoffman triumphed over Jens Nickel and the Baker-system game was won by Team USA.

After day two Team USA led with a significant 12–6 lead. Europe won the final day's first session to get back into contention at 11–12, before leading 14–13 going into the final evening session.

Both teams were tied 17–17 going into the final, decisive Baker-system game. At one point in the game, Team Europe led by over 30 pins, with Mack and Hoffman failing to strike. In the ninth frame, Europe's Torgersen missed a difficult split, allowing Tommy Jones to narrowly win the competition for Team USA.

=== 2007 ===
The 2007 Weber Cup competition was a close match again, with Team USA eventual winning 17–15.

On Day One, in the fifth match, Tommy Jones rolled the second-ever perfect game in the tournament's history, and at close of play, the scores were tied at 4 matches apiece.

On Day Two, Team USA took a 7–5 lead, although Team Europe won the final Baker match and brought the scores back to a 9–9 tie in the evening's final match.

Team Europe won five of the six matches on Day Three, but Team USA won seven of the eight games in the final session, narrowly winning the 2007 Weber Cup. This win extended Team USA's overall lead to 5–3 in the series.

=== 2008 ===
The 2008 Weber Cup took place at the Barnsley Metrodome from 3 to 5 October 2008.

Both teams had familiar line-ups, which featured several Weber Cup veterans, including Tore Torgersen (Norway) for Team Europe, and Tim Mack for Team USA, who again captained his side. Torgersen was joined by Paul Moor (England), who was playing in his fourth Weber Cup. Finland's Mika Koivuniemi and Osku Palermaa also returned, and making his debut in the competition was Dominic Barrett from England. Palermaa was given the captaincy for Team Europe for the first time, taking over from Sweden's Tomas Leandersson. Team USA featured four stars of the PBA tour, with Chris Barnes, Tommy Jones and Jason Couch returning for more Weber Cup action. They were joined by Pete Weber, who made his first appearance in the tournament named after his late father, PBA star Dick Weber.

Team Europe 2008

Team Europe (as pictured, left to right)

- Dominic Barrett – Cambridge, England
- Tore Torgersen – Stavanger, Norway
- Paul Moor – Beverley, England
- Osku Palermaa – Espoo, Finland (Captain)
- Mika Koivuniemi – Tampere, Finland

Team USA 2008

Team USA (as pictured, left to right)

- Tommy Jones – Simpsonville, South Carolina
- Chris Barnes – Flower Mound, Texas
- Jason Couch – Clermont, Florida
- Tim Mack – Garfield, New Jersey (Captain)
- Pete Weber – St. Ann, Missouri

Team USA ultimately won the 2008 competition 17–13, the largest margin of victory for since 2003, for another set of three consecutive wins. The winning point was won on the final baker team game.

=== 2009 ===
During the 2009 Weber Cup, Martin Laarsen debuted on the European team. Tommy Jones completed his hat-trick of 300 games, with three in three years at the Weber Cup. However, Team Europe ultimately won the tournament 17-11, ending Team USA's three-year streak.

=== 2010 ===
The 2010 contest included a baker-system game consisting of a European victory 156–154, one of the lowest scores in Weber Cup history. The tournament was ultimately won by Team Europe, captained once again by Osku Palermaa.

== Results table ==
Year	Venue	Winner		Loser		Series
2000	Warsaw, Poland	USA	18	Europe	11	USA 1−0
2001	Dagenham, UK	USA	18	Europe	12	USA 2−0
2002	Sheffield, UK	USA	18	Europe	13	USA 3−0
2003	Greater Manchester, UK	Europe	18	USA	14	USA 3−1
2004	Greater Manchester, UK	Europe	18	USA	11	USA 3−2
2005	Barnsley, UK	Europe	18	USA	16	Tied 3−3
2006	Barnsley, UK	USA	18	Europe	17	USA 4−3
2007	Barnsley, UK	USA	17	Europe	15	USA 5−3
2008	Barnsley, UK	USA	17	Europe	13	USA 6−3
2009	Barnsley, UK	Europe	17	USA	11	USA 6−4
2010	Barnsley, UK	Europe	17	USA	13	USA 6−5
2011	Barnsley, UK	USA	17	Europe	15	USA 7−5
2012	Barnsley, UK	USA	17	Europe	7	USA 8−5
2013	Barnsley, UK	Europe	17	USA	14	USA 8−6
2014	Barnsley, UK	Europe	17	USA	16	USA 8−7
2015	Barnsley, UK	Europe	17	USA	8	Tied 8−8
2016	Greater Manchester, UK	Europe	19	USA	11	EUR 9−8
2017	Barnsley, UK	Europe	19	USA	12	EUR 10−8
2018	Milton Keynes, UK	USA	19	Europe	10	EUR 10−9
2019	Las Vegas, USA	USA	18	Europe	14	Tied 10−10
2020	Coventry, UK	USA	23	Europe	18	USA 11−10
2021	Leicester, UK	Europe	18	USA	17	Tied 11−11

== Past events ==
- 2008 Weber Cup – Team USA Win, Barnsley Metrodome.
- 2007 Weber Cup – Team USA Win, Barnsley Metrodome.
- 2006 Weber Cup – Team USA Win, Barnsley Metrodome.
- 2005 Weber Cup – Team Europe win, Barnsley Metrodome.
- 2004 Weber Cup – Team Europe win, Altrincham Leisure Centre, Greater Manchester, England.
- 2003 Weber Cup – Team Europe win, Altrincham Leisure Centre, Greater Manchester, England.
- 2002 Weber Cup – Team USA win, Ponds Forge International Center, Sheffield, England.
- 2001 Weber Cup – Team USA win, Goresbrook Leisure Centre, Dagenham, England
- 2000 Weber Cup – Team USA win, Inaugural event in Warsaw, Poland.
