= Mitch Hupé =

Canadian ten-pin bowler

Personal information
- Born: February 20, 1995 (age 31) Manitoba, Canada

Bowling Information
- Affiliation: PBA
- Rookie year: 2018
- Dominant hand: Right
- Wins: 1 PBA Tour
- Sponsors: 900 Global; VISE
Medal record
Representing Canada
Bowling
World Championships
Gold medal – first place	2018 Hong Kong	Master's
Gold medal – first place	2023 Kuwait City	Men's team
Pan American Games
Silver medal – second place	2023 Santiago	Men's individual
Silver medal – second place	2023 Santiago	Men's doubles

Mitch Hupé (born February 20, 1995) is a right-handed Canadian ten-pin bowler from Winnipeg, Manitoba, Canada. He is a two-time bowling world champion, winning the Master's division in 2018 in Hong Kong and a men's team championship in 2023 in Kuwait. Hupé won two silver medals at the 2023 Pan American Games in Santiago, winning silver in the individual competition and in the doubles with François Lavoie. He bowled collegiately for Wichita State University in the USA and now bowls professionally on the PBA Tour, where he has earned one title.

Hupé is a pro staff member for 900 Global bowling balls and VISE grip inserts.

== Career ==
=== National team ===
Hupé won a gold medal individually in the world championship in 2018 and added a team gold in the men's division in 2023 in Kuwait City. He won two silver medals at the 2023 Pan American Games, both in the individual and doubles event with François Lavoie. After his first Pan American Games experience and silver medal Hupé said that "It's bittersweet for sure. To lead the event up until the end and then to have it come down to basically one game — it's unfortunate but it's the way it was… He didn't give me much room to breathe. So a couple of errors on my part and that's all she wrote. Despite that, I'm still proud of my performance. I'm happy to bring back two silver medals for Canada. It's a first Pan Am Games experience and I'd say it's a successful one, despite the ending."

=== PBA Tour ===
Hupé has been a member of the Professional Bowlers Association since 2018. His first taste of victory on the PBA Tour was as a member of the Portland Lumberjacks PBA League team in 2019. He won his first PBA Tour title in the 2023 Roth-Holman Doubles Championship, with fellow Wichita State alumnus Packy Hanrahan.

== Career statistics ==
=== PBA ===
Season	Events	Cashes	Match Play	CRA+	PBA Tour Titles	Regional Titles	Average	Earnings (US$)
2018	17	8	4	0	0	0	209.60	11,035
2019	23	7	3	1	0	0	211.45	33,075
2020	6	4	3	0	0	0	212.64	13,630
2021	8	2	0	0	0	0	200.73	5,900
2022	8	6	2	0	0	0	212.19	25,100
2023	12	5	1	1	1	0	214.57	26,800

+CRA = Championship Round Appearances (PBA Tour only)

== Personal ==
Hupé lives in Winnipeg, Manitoba and as of 2023 works as an IT specialist in a department of the Government of Manitoba.
