= Petter Hansen =

Norwegian ten-pin bowler

Petter Hansen is a Norwegian Ten-pin bowler.

== Bowling career ==
He was runner up at the 2004 AMF Bowling World Cup, losing the final match to Finland's Kai Virtanen, 2 games to 1.

He was runner up at the 2006 AMF World Cup, losing the final match to Finland's Osku Palermaa 2 games to 1.

Hansen has 2 EBT titles to his name.
