= 2021 WTBA World Tenpin Bowling Championships =

Tenpin bowling competition

29th ten-pin bowling World Championships
- Host city: Dubai
- Country: United Arab Emirates
- Athletes: 115 (133 men + 92 women)
- Sport: 10-pins
- Events: 9
- Opening: November 6, 2021
- Closing: November 15, 2021

The 2021 WTBA World Tenpin Bowling Championships was the 29th edition of the championships and held in Dubai, UAE, in November 2021.

== Format ==
All doubles, trios and team competition at the World Championships featured variations of the Baker format from start to finish. Each event at the 2021 Super World Championships included 10 qualifying games, all at the Dubai International Bowling Centre, before a cut was made to the top 32 for singles and doubles and the top 16 for trios and the team events.

The advancing bowlers or teams were divided into four equal groups for round-robin match play within that group. Points were awarded for each win in match play, and the top two in each group, based on points, advanced to the single-elimination bracket-style quarterfinals.

Quarterfinal winners advanced to the semifinals and got to experience the custom venue at Expo 2020 Dubai.

== Medal summary ==
Event	Gold	Silver	Bronze
Men's singles	James Blomgren (SWE)	Tomas Kayhko (FIN)	Geun Ji (KOR); Nicola Pongolini (ITA)
Men's doubles	Lithuania; Laurynas Narušis; Aidas Daniūnas	Sweden; Jesper Svensson; Pontus Andersson	Sweden; James Blomgren; William Svensson; United States; Andrew Anderson; Kris Prather
Men's trios	United States	South Korea	Czech Republic; Sweden
Men's teams	South Korea	Singapore	Malaysia; Philippines
Women's singles	Shayna Ng (SGP)	Cherie Tan (SGP)	Sofia Rodriguez (GUA); Sarah Klassen (CAN)
Women's doubles	Germany; Janin Ribguth; Martina Shutz	Sweden; Sandra Andersson; Joline Planetors	Finland; Konsteri Peppi; Juntunen Ani; Denmark; Cecilie Dam; Mika Guldbaek
Women's trios	South Korea	Guatemala	Colombia; Singapore
Women's teams	United States	Malaysia	Finland; Philippines
Mixed teams	Sweden	United States	Singapore; Sweden

=== Medal table ===
* Host nation (United Arab Emirates)

Rank	Nation	Gold	Silver	Bronze	Total
1	Sweden (SWE)	2	2	3	7
2	South Korea (KOR)	2	1	1	4
2	United States (USA)	2	1	1	4
4	Singapore (SGP)	1	2	2	5
5	Germany (GER)	1	0	0	1
5	Lithuania (LTU)	1	0	0	1
7	Finland (FIN)	0	1	2	3
8	Guatemala (GUA)	0	1	1	2
8	Malaysia (MAS)	0	1	1	2
10	Philippines (PHI)	0	0	2	2
11	Canada (CAN)	0	0	1	1
11	Colombia (COL)	0	0	1	1
11	Czech Republic (CZE)	0	0	1	1
11	Denmark (DEN)	0	0	1	1
11	Italy (ITA)	0	0	1	1
Totals (15 entries)		9	9	18	36
