= Jens Nickel =

German ten-pin bowler (born 1965)

Jens Nickel (born 28 January 1965 in Bad Gandersheim) is one of Germany's leading Ten-pin bowlers. He plays for the bowling team Strikees, Germany and any world championship events.

Jens Nickel became the world champion in 2005 during the world-famous bowling World Tenpin Masters, beating England's Paul Moor in the final and was subsequently crowned World Tenpin Masters champion. Earlier in the year he won the Brunswick Euro Challenge, one of the most prestigious World Ranking Tournaments in Europe.

Jens Nickel is sponsored by the Bowltech Germany bowling company.

Other titles that he has won are 2003 World Championships - Silver Medal - Doubles Event - Bronze Medal and the 2003 and 2005 German Bowler of the Year awards.

His biggest achievements in bowling championships are Gold, European Trios in 1997, Silver in the European Cup Team in 1994, Silver in the World Doubles in 2003, Bronze in European Five-Team in 1989, Bronze in European Trios in 1989, Bronze in the World All Event in 2003 and Bronze in European Trios in 2005.
