= Tanya Petty =

German ten-pin bowler

Tanya Petty is a German ten-pin bowler. She finished in 11th position of the combined rankings at the 2006 AMF World Cup.
