= Wesley Low =

American bowler

Personal information
- Born: Palmdale, California

Sport
- Country: USA
- Sport: Bowling

Achievements and titles
- World finals: World Youth Bowling Championships 5 time Gold medal winner
- National finals: 5 time member of Team USA; US Amateur Champion; 9 PBA Regional Tour titles 2 Time Junior Gold Champion
Medal record
World Youth Tenpin Bowling Championships
Gold medal – first place	2014 Hong Kong	All Events
Gold medal – first place	2014 Hong Kong	Team
Gold medal – first place	2016 Lincoln	Singles
Gold medal – first place	2016 Lincoln	Doubles
Gold medal – first place	2016 Lincoln	Team

Wesley Low Jr. is an American bowler from Palmdale, California. He uses the two-handed shovel-style delivery with a dominant left hand. He is the 36th bowler in tournament history to record a 900 series or three consecutive perfect games. Low is the youngest bowler to win a Professional Bowlers Association (PBA) Regional Tour event, which he did at the age of 15 as a non-member. He has been a member of the PBA since 2019.

He was a member of Team USA in 2014, when he won the all-events gold medal at the World Bowling Youth Championships with a record 18-game total of 4,224, a 234.6 average.

At the Team USA Trials in 2019, he finished second to longtime Team USA member John Janawicz, earning him a spot on the adult version of Team USA for the first time. He won the men's title at the 2019 United States National Amateur Bowling Championships, which were held alongside the Team Trials.

As a youth bowler, he had success in PBA Regional Tour competition, winning four Regional titles as a non-member. He is now a PBA competitor, and has won 9 PBA Regional titles to date, following his win in the first-ever "PBA Elite Regional Tour" stop for the West Region in September of 2026.

Low is a member of the MOTIV Bowling pro staff.
