= Osku Palermaa =

Finnish professional ten-pin bowler (born 1983)

Personal information
- Born: Osku Palermaa; 18 November 1983 (age 42) Espoo, Finland
- Years active: 2004–present
- Height: 183 cm (6 ft 0 in)

Bowling Information
- Affiliation: PBA
- Rookie year: 2004
- Dominant hand: Right (two-handed delivery)
- Wins: 5 PBA Tour (1 major)
- Sponsors: Brunswick

Osku Palermaa
Achievements and titles
National finals
5 PBA Tour titles (1 major)
Osku Palermaa
Medal record
Men's bowling
Representing Finland
World Games
Gold medal – first place	2013 Cali	Singles

Osku Palermaa (born 18 November 1983 in Espoo, Finland) is a Finnish ten-pin bowler now living in Partille, Sweden. He is a competitor on the European Bowling Tour, World Bowling Tour, and PBA Tour.

== Today ==
Palermaa has 18 professional bowling titles to his name. He has won 13 EBT titles, and 5 PBA Tour titles.

He was the EBT ranking champion for three consecutive years from 2007 to 2009, he also won the rankings 2011. Palermaa was also joint runner up in the 2005 EBT rankings, and runner up in the 2006 EBT rankings.

Osku made his television debut at the 2004 U.S Open, making him the first two-handed bowler to compete in a televised PBA Tour event. He won his first U.S. PBA Tour title at the 2010 Geico Shark Championship, which was part of the PBA World Series of Bowling in Las Vegas, Nevada. Palermaa has since won four more PBA Tour titles, including the 2011 PBA World Championship which made him the first two-handed bowler to win a major.

Palermaa has to date bowled 78 perfect games, including five in PBA Tour events.

Palermaa was captain of the European team for the Weber Cup from 2008 to 2012.

== Achievements ==
=== 2006 ===
Palermaa won the bronze medal at the World Ranking Masters tournament.

Palermaa won the 2006 AMF World Cup, defeating Norway's Petter Hansen 2 games to 1 in the final. Palermaa averaged over 250 in the qualifying rounds (24 games), bowling 2 perfect games in the process.

Palermaa was voted the 'Bowler Of The Year' by the industry writers, and was also voted 'Bowler Of The Year' in his native Finland, and 'Athlete Of The Year' in his home town, Espoo

=== 2007 ===
In April, Palermaa was invited for the first time to participate in the World Tenpin Masters tournament, held at the Barnsley Metrodome. Palermaa beat South Africa's Guy Caminsky in the first round (464-438), before losing to the 2006 champion, American PBA bowler Chris Barnes in the quarter-final (490-467).

Following this, Palermaa travelled to Turkey for the 4th Istanbul open, and was victorious, defeating fellow two-handed bowler Jason Belmonte from Australia in the single-game final (258-195). This win, his 5th on the European Bowling Tour and his 2nd in 2007, put him on top of the 2007 EBT rankings, narrowly ahead of 3-time EBT ranking champion, Paul Moor from England.

Palermaa participated in the 2007 World Ranking Masters at the Kegel Training Centre, Lake Wales, Florida, U.S., and finished the 24 game qualifier as the number 1 seed, with an average of 241.58. He was then defeated in the quarter-finals by Thomas Gross of Austria 2-0 (196-265, 203-207). Palermaa finished in 5th position.

Palermaa has been voted Finnish 'Bowler of the Year' 2008 - 2009.

=== International tournament titles ===
2005

Super Series Tour Championships Champion

2008

European Ranking Masters

Super Six Gothenburg

2009

World Ranking Masters

Super Six Super Star

2010

Dubai International

=== European Bowling Tour titles ===
2005

III Catalonia Open - Trofeu Galasa

Columbia 300 Vienna Open

2006

Kungsbacka International Tournament

2007

Brunswick Euro Challenge

4th Istanbul Bowling Open

2008

Brunswick Aalborg International

Ebonite Lahti Open

2009

Hammer Bronzen Schietspoel Tournament

=== PBA Tour titles ===
2010

Won the Geico Shark Championship at the PBA World Series of Bowling in Las Vegas, Nevada (USA) on November 6, 2010.

2011

Won the PBA World Championship in Las Vegas, NV on November 18, 2011. This was his second PBA Tour title and first PBA major.

2013

Won the WBT Bahrain Open on March 10, 2013 for his third PBA Tour title.

2014

Won the WBT Thailand Open on August 28, 2014; his fourth PBA Tour title.

2015

Won the WBT Bowling World Open in Tokyo on July 12, 2015; his fifth PBA Tour title.

== Miscellaneous ==
- Palermaa is one of few bowlers at the professional level to use two different styles in regular play. Although he primarily uses the two handed "shovel" style, which gives him a high RPM (revolutions per minute) rate, he also employs a conventional one-handed style for certain situations. Palermaa is oftentimes regarded as the "world's strongest bowler" given that his ball speed exceeds most pros by nearly 10 miles per hour at times.
