= Pauliina Aalto =

Finnish ten-pin bowling player

- Born: 25 November 1967 (age 58); Helsinki

Pauliina Aalto (born 25 November 1967) is a Finnish former Ten-pin bowling player at international level. She was the women's Masters Level European Champion.

== Biography ==
Aalto was born in Helsinki in 1967 and her father and her brother competed at bowling. Aalto took up Ten-pin bowling in 1979. She took part World contest in 1993 where she won a gold medal for the doubles. Between 1993 and 1997 she won numerous medals including 11 gold medals. In 1995 she gave up her job in order to concentrate on her bowling full time. She became the women's Masters Level European Champion. She was in America the following year to compete against other professionals. Aalto and her partner organised a contest in 2008 in Lahti in Finland where they owned a bowls shop.

Aalto has been recognised for her contribution to bowling in Finland joining the Hall of Fame of the Finnish Bowling Association.
