= Nikki Harvey =

English ten-pin bowler

Nikki Harvey is an English Ten-pin bowler, from Southampton.

Nikki won the 2003 World Tenpin Masters defeating Andrew Frawley from Australia at the Goresbrook Leisure Centre in Dagenham.
