= Paul Moor =

English bowler (born 1978)

Paul Moor (born 3 September 1978), of Kingston-upon-Hull, East Riding of Yorkshire, England is one of the world's leading ten-pin bowlers. He bowls on the European Bowling Tour (EBT) and has been a member of the Professional Bowlers Association (PBA) for several years.

== Early years ==
Moor first started bowling at the age of 10 when he joined the Saturday morning Junior League at the AMF Bowling Centre in Hull. His parents were league bowlers at the centre which was the main influence for him taking up the sport. He enjoyed plenty of success in his latter years as a junior, winning many national titles. He also teamed up with fellow Hull Bowler, Robert Batty and won a multitude of Doubles Titles including victories at the BTBA Junior Nationals at both Senior and Graduate level. He represented the Junior England Team in 1997 at the "European Youth Team Cup" in Annecy, France where he won a silver medal despite the team having the highest team average in the Championship.

After finishing his time in junior bowling Moor started to bowl more regularly on the Adult circuit in England and won his first English ranking event in 1999 at the AMF World Cup Qualifier, held in Nottingham. Moor went on to represent England, making his first appearance at the AMF World Cup in Las Vegas but his lack of international experience did not help and he failed to qualify for the top 24.

== Today ==
Moor is one of the top English bowlers on the European bowling scene along with Stuart Williams and Dominic Barrett.

Moor is currently ranked No.6 in Europe (2014 EBT rankings), is a 3-time winner, of the European Bowling Tour. (EBT) and is a Commonwealth Championships double gold medallist.

Moor has 28 Perfect Games, a High 3 Games series of 857 and a high 6 Game Series of 1588.

In September 2014 Moor became the all-time leader on the EBT with 14 titles when he won the Chandra Open in The Netherlands, averaging 250 over 10 games in the final. Two weeks later he won his 15th title with victory over Tommy Jones in the Columbia 300 Vienna Open.

On 11 January 2015, Moor won his record 16th EBT title in the Brunswick Ballmaster Open in Helsinki, Finland, defeating Finnish native Joonas Jehkinen in the final match, 225–204. Because Moor is now a PBA member, he also earned his first PBA title in this event and qualified to bowl in the PBA Tournament of Champions in February, 2015.

== Achievements ==
=== World ===
QubicaAMF World Cup: 5 appearances (1999, 2001, 2004, 2007, 2013). Best finish:- 5th (2007)
World Ranking Masters: 4 appearances (2005-2007, 2009). Best finish:- 3rd (2007)
World Tenpin Masters: 4 appearances (2005-2008). Runner-up 3 times (2005-2007) Semi-Finalist (2008)
Weber Cup: 5 appearances for Team Europe (2005-2009)
World Bowling Writer's Bowler of the Year: 2005

=== Commonwealth ===
2008 Commonwealth Championships:-

- Men's Doubles:- Silver
- Team:- Gold
- Men's Master's:- Gold

=== European ===
Moor has 17 EBT titles to his name, since 2004. This puts him top of the all-time list of EBT titles.

EBT titles:-
2004 Malta Open Championships
2004 26 Trofeo Internacional Ciutat de Barcelona
2005 Irish Open Championships
2005 Championship Golden Bowl - Trofeo Brunswick
2005 Norwegian Open
2006 3rd Istanbul Bowling Open
2006 28 Trofeo Internacional Ciutat de Barcelona
2006 3rd Oltremare Ebonite Championships
2007 Hammer Bronzen Schietspoel Tournament
2007 Ebonite International Luxembourg Open
2009 5th Storm San Marino Open
2013 Brunswick Madrid Challenge
2013 Brunswick Etna Open
2014 Chandra Open
2014 Columbia 300 Vienna Open
2015 Brunswick Ballmaster Open
2016 Storm Irish Open

Moor was won the EBT Masters on three occasions, in 2009, 2015 and 2017.

Other Titles:-
2002 British Open
2003 London International
2004 Championship Golden Bowl, Italy
2006 English Open
2008 Malta Open Championships
2008 4th Cockatoos Pafos Open, Cyprus
2009 Irish Open Championships
2009 Welsh Open Championships
2009 2nd EBT Masters
2010 London International
2010 2nd Galactica Open, Cyprus
2012 Welsh Open Championships
2014 English Open
2016 Welsh Open Championships
2017 Sofia Open
2019 Welsh Open Championships
2019 English Open

=== Domestic ===
Moor has over 30 English National Titles to his name, spanning several years.
Moor has been voted "English Bowler of the Year" 6 times. (2002-2006, 2015) Moor has been elected to the 2015 UK Tenpin Hall of Fame.

=== PBA Tour ===
2015: Won the Brunswick Ballmaster Open in January for his first PBA title; finished runner-up to Parker Bohn III at the PBA Cheetah Championship in December.

== Weber Cup ==
Moor has played for Team Europe in the annual Weber Cup tournament on 7 occasions (2005-2011)
Moor's record from 48 matches played (singles and doubles) is won 31, lost 17, with a winning percentage of 64.5%. Moor has finished on the winning side three times (2005, 2009 and 2010).

== Miscellaneous ==
- Moor is nicknamed 'Rodge' due to his surname being close to James Bond '007' Actor, Roger Moore.
- Moor was the first bowler to roll a Perfect Game on Live TV in the UK, achieving the historic feat in the first game of the 2006 Weber Cup tournament, against Jason Couch.
- Moor has been the unfortunate runner-up in three consecutive World Tenpin Masters tournaments (2005, 2006 and 2007).
- Moor's brother, Ian Moor, won the hit TV talent show "Stars in Their Eyes."
