= Tore Torgersen =

Norwegian ten-pin bowling player

Personal information
- Born: September 10, 1968 (age 57) Stavanger, Norway

Sport
- Country: Sweden
- Sport: Bowling

Achievements and titles
- World finals: 1994 AMF Bowling World Cup: Champion; 1998 World Tenpin Masters: Champion; 2002 World Tenpin Masters: Champion; 2004 World Tenpin Masters: Champion
Medal record
Representing Sweden
Men's Bowling
World Tenpin Bowling Championships
Silver medal – second place	1995 Reno	All Events
Gold medal – first place	1999 Abu Dhabi	All Events
Silver medal – second place	1999 Abu Dhabi	Trios
Bronze medal – third place	2008 Bangkok	All Events
Bronze medal – third place	2008 Bangkok	Doubles

Tore Torgersen (born 10 September 1968) was one of the world's leading ten-pin bowlers. He is born in Stavanger, Norway but lives in Sweden.

Tore started to bowl in 1980.

Tore has bowled in the prestigious Weber Cup on three occasions and won two of those events.

Tore is a member of the bowling team BK Skrufscha / Sweden and Trondheim BK / Norway.

Torgersen has stated that the highlight of his career was becoming world champion in UAE. He also won the Bowling World Cup in Hermosillo, Mexico in 1994.

In 2002 Torgersen thrilled a capacity crowd to become the first double champion of the Hasseröder World Tenpin Masters. In 2006, he became a three time World Tenpin Masters champion.

He was a member of the PBA (Professional Bowlers Association) earlier but he now runs a proshop and rarely plays outside of Scandinavia unless there's a major championship.

As a 50-year old, Torgersen won the 2019 Suncoast PBA Senior U.S. Open, a major event on the PBA50 Tour, defeating top qualifier Mika Koivuniemi of Finland in an all-Scandinavia final. No longer a PBA member, Torgerson was not credited with a PBA50 title.
