= Britt Brøndsted =

Danish ten-pin bowler

Britt Brøndsted (born 1 June 1981) is a Danish ten-pin bowler who is one of Denmark's top right-handed female ten-pin bowlers.

In 2003 she was the World Ranking World Tenpin Masters Champion. In 2004 she was the European Ranking Champion; also in 2004 she was the Greece Brunswick Euro Challenge Champion and the Qatar International Champion.

In 2006 she competed in the World Tenpin Masters tournament.
