= Mai Ginge Jensen =

Danish ten-pin bowler (born 1984)

Mai Ginge Jensen (born 1984) is a Danish ten-pin bowler. She finished in 2nd position of the combined rankings at the 2006 AMF World Cup. During the final round she finished in 7th position.

Her sister Anja Ginge Jensen is also an elite bowler.
