= Dominic Barrett =

British ten-pin bowler (born 1985)

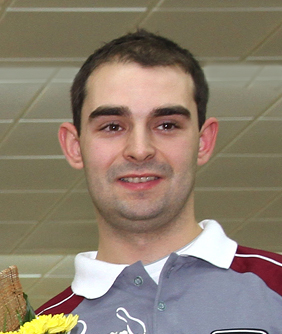
- Barrett in 2011

Personal information
- Born: July 30, 1985 (age 41)

Bowling Information
- Affiliation: PBA, EBT
- Dominant hand: Right (power stroker delivery)
- Wins: 10 PBA Tour (3 majors); 14 EBT
- 300-games: 65
- Sponsors: Storm Products, Turbo 2n1 Grips, Dexter shoes

Dominic “Dom” Simon Barrett (born 30 July 1985 in Cambridge, England) is one of England's leading ten-pin bowlers. He competes in world events and on the PBA Tour, where he has won ten titles. This total includes three PBA major titles: the PBA World Championship (2013), the U.S. Open (2018) and the Tournament of Champions (2022), which makes him one of nine triple crown winners in PBA history and the first European player to accomplish the feat. He has been the ranking winner on the European Bowling Tour (EBT) in three seasons (2010, 2012 and 2013) and is also the only player to have been named as ‘World Bowling Writers’ bowler of the year three consecutive times. He is nicknamed "The Dominator".

For much of his PBA career, Barrett was sponsored by the Track division of Ebonite International. He became a member of the Brunswick pro staff after Brunswick purchased Ebonite in late 2019. In 2026, he signed a new sponsorship deal with Storm. He is also sponsored by Turbo 2n1 grips and Dexter shoes.

== Perfect Games ==
To date, Barrett has bowled 65 perfect 300 games in professional competition, including 18 on the PBA Tour.

== Achievements ==
Barrett has 13 European Bowling Tour (EBT) titles to his name as of the end of the 2019 season, plus ten PBA titles as of 2024.

=== 2008 ===
Barrett was the EBT ranking runner-up in 2008.

=== 2009 ===
In the first stage of the World Tenpin Masters, Barrett won 2–0 against Guy Caminsky from South Africa. In the second stage of the tournament, Barrett won 2–0 against Paeng Nepomuceno from the Philippines. In the third stage, he defeated Finnish bowler Osku Palermaa 2–0. He then beat Chris Barnes in the semifinals with a two-game score of 490. In the end, Barrett won the World Tenpin Masters at the Barnsley Metrodome with a 505 over two games, beating his opponent Jason Belmonte of Australia. Barrett would also win the Weber Cup with Team Europe this year.

=== 2010 ===
Barrett was Ranking Winner on the EBT for the 2010 season.

=== 2011 ===
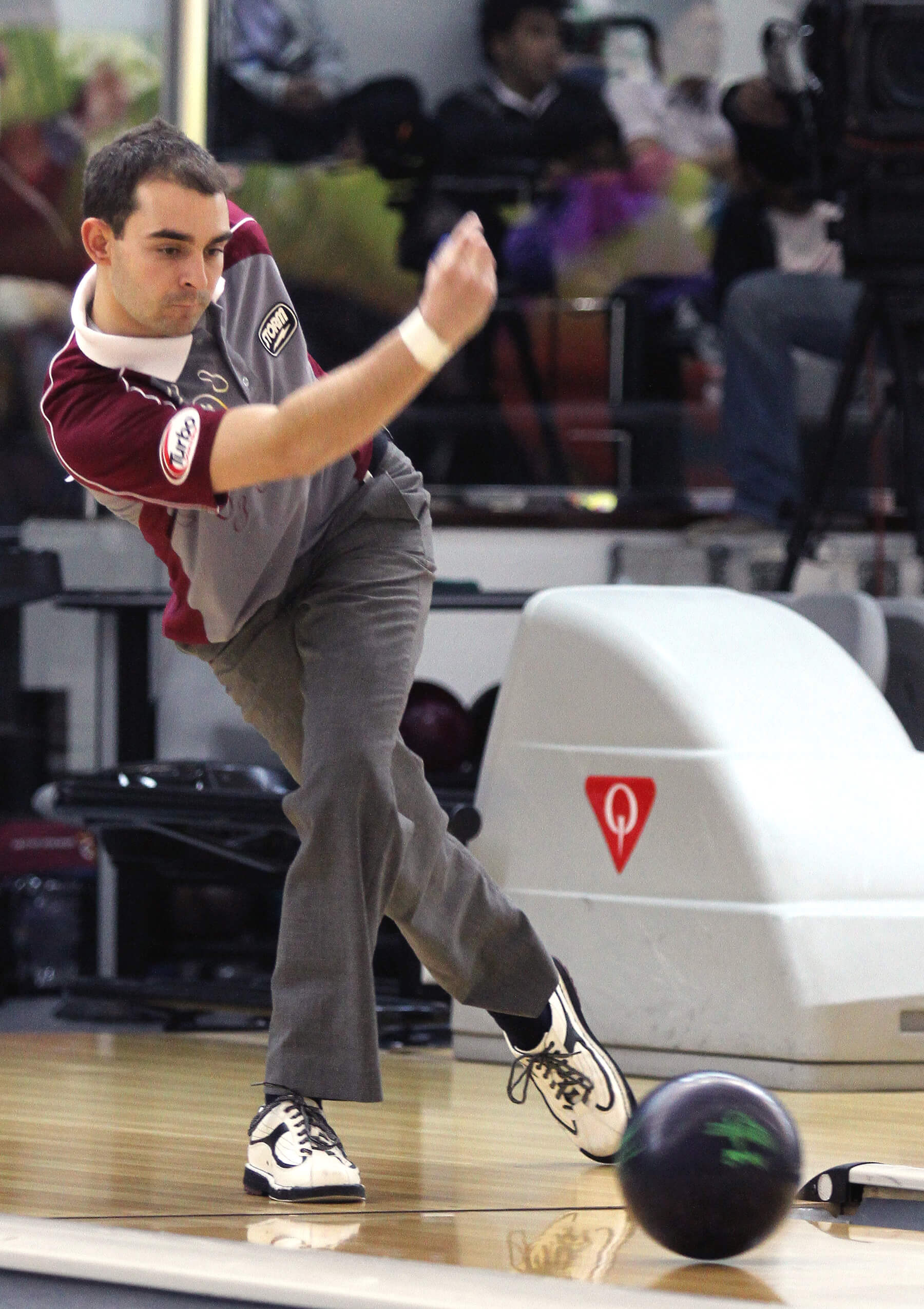
Barrett competing in 2011

On November 19, 2011, in his American television debut (broadcast February 19, 2012), Barrett defeated American Sean Rash of Montgomery, IL, 247–204, to win the Professional Bowlers Association Scorpion Open at the South Point Casino and Hotel in Las Vegas. This was his first PBA Tour title.

=== 2012 ===
While unable to win a PBA title, Barrett was Ranking Winner on the EBT for the 2012 season.

=== 2013 ===
Barrett won the Weber Cup XIV with Team Europe teammates Mika Koivuniemi, Martin Larsen and Stuart Williams. He captured the 2013 PBA World Championship for his second PBA Tour title and first PBA major. He then won the 2013 Qatar Open in Doha, Qatar, which qualified as his third PBA title in addition to a World Bowling Tour title.

On the EBT, Barrett was Ranking Winner for the third time in his career in 2013.

=== 2014 ===
Barrett successfully defended his 2013 Qatar Open championship by winning the event again on 27 November 2014. He defeated Stuart Williams 395–388 over the two-game final in an all-England title match. This was his fourth PBA title.

=== 2015 ===
Barrett finished runner-up at the 2015 Bowlmor AMF U.S. Open, defeating three opponents in the stepladder final before losing to Ryan Ciminelli in the final match, 236–223. In December, 2015, Barrett was the #1 seed for the PBA World Bowling Tour Men's Finals, held in Reno, NV, and defeated Mike Fagan in the final match. The three finalists for this non-title event were chosen and seeded based on a rolling points list of PBA International-World Bowling Tour tournaments held over the previous two years. Barrett made a career-high nine championship round appearances during the 2015 PBA season.

=== 2016 ===
Despite not winning a PBA Tour event in 2016, Barrett still had PBA earnings of almost US$117,000, thanks to a third-place finish in the PBA World Championship and a second-place finish in DHC PBA Japan Invitational.

=== 2017 ===
Barrett topped a 345-player field at the Brunswick Euro Challenge on 26 March 2017, defeating Thailand's Jojoe Yannaphon in the final match to win the €12,500 first prize and his fifth PBA title. As one of the top eight PBA Tour money leaders from the start of the 2015 season through the 2017 USBC Masters, Barrett was invited to participate in the inaugural Main Event PBA Tour Finals in May, 2017. He placed seventh in the event.

=== 2018 ===
On January 28, 2018, Barrett won his sixth PBA title at the DHC PBA Japan Invitational in Tokyo, topping American Kyle Troup in the final match. On October 31, Barrett won his seventh PBA title and second PBA major at the U.S. Open, defeating top seed Jakob Butturff in the final match by a single pin, 207–206. Following this win, Barrett is now title-eligible for the PBA Hall of Fame (having two major championships with at least five total titles). Barrett was announced as a finalist for the 2018 PBA Player of the Year award, but the award was given to Andrew Anderson.

=== 2019 ===
Barrett qualified as the #14 seed for the inaugural PBA Tour Playoffs in 2019. He made it to the Round of 8 before being defeated by #6 seed Sean Rash. Barrett won his eighth PBA Tour title at the PBA-WBT Kuwait Open on November 8, 2019. Per tournament rules, Barrett had to beat the #1 qualifier, Iceland's Arnar Jonsson, twice to earn the title, which he did by scores of 289–235 and 278–277. Barrett also won the non-title World Bowling Tour Men's Finals during this same stop.

=== 2022 ===
After going through the COVID-shortened 2020 PBA Tour season and the 2021 season without winning, Barrett returned to the winner's circle on February 27, 2022, winning the PBA Tournament of Champions. After a convincing 279–201 semifinal match win over Shawn Maldonado, Barrett defeated top seed Kristopher Prather 210–189 in the final match. Barrett's ninth PBA title gave him a win in all three of the PBA Tour's original major championships, making him the eighth triple crown winner in PBA history. Barrett won his tenth PBA Tour title at the Storm Cup: Colorado Springs Open on March 24, 2022. As the No. 1 seed, he defeated Finland's Santtu Tahvanainen 244–234 in the final match. Barrett also earned a US$5,000 bonus for finishing second in points over the four-event Storm Cup series.

On July 3, Barrett won the Brunswick Euro Challenge in Munich, Germany for his 14th EBT title. (The event was not counted a PBA Tour stop this season.) He defeated Sweden's Kim Bolleby in the final stepladder match, 236–235, to earn the title and €11,000 top prize.

Barrett cashed a career-high US$201,595 in PBA earnings during the 2022 season.

=== 2023 ===
Barrett won the non-title PBA Skill Ball Challenge on July 23, 2023. This was a tournament featuring the eight highest point earners from the five Classic Series events held earlier in the season. All players were required to use identical low-technology Skill 3.02 bowling balls on two differently oiled lanes. After losing to Matt Ogle 193–150 in the first match of the race-to-two-points final, Barrett made a drastic move and won the second game 213–172. He then won the ninth/tenth frame roll-off, 37–24, to earn the victory and $16,000 top prize.

=== 2025 ===
Barrett ranked #17 on the PBA's 2025 "Best 25 PBA Players of the Last 25 Seasons" list. The ranking was based on a points system that took into account standard titles, major titles, top-five finishes and Player of the Year awards.

=== 2026 ===
On February 15, 2026, Barrett was named a captain's selection by Jason Belmonte for the USA vs. The World team match on April 4. The World team went on to defeat the USA.

== PBA career statistics ==
Statistics are through the last complete PBA season.

Season	Events	Cashes	Match Play	CRA+	PBA Titles	Average	Earnings ($US)
2010-11	6	2	1	0	0	217.20	4,080
2011-12	12	9	3	3	1	219.63	34,255
2012-13	26	21	7	2	2	222.70	155,302
2014	19	17	5	2	1	222.47	132,454
2015	21	15	12	9	0	222.62	94,602
2016	24	16	9	3	0	222.80	116,890
2017	21	16	10	2	1	222.39	84,300
2018	15	12	7	3	2	218.36	108,970
2019	26	18	10	4	1	217.32	119,268
2020	12	7	5	0	0	217.24	42,250
2021	14	9	6	0	0	212.34	23,650
2022	16	12	12	4	2	222.85	201,595
2023	19	13	9	3	0	217.07	98,975
2024	17	7	2	1	0	220.39	49,957
2025	15	6	5	1	0	215.91	47,825

+CRA = Championship Round Appearances

=== PBA titles ===
Major championships in bold type.

1. 2011 WSOB III Scorpion Open (Las Vegas, Nevada)
2. **2013 PBA World Championship** (Las Vegas, Nevada)
3. 2013 PBA-WBT Qatar Open (Doha, Qatar)
4. 2014 PBA-WBT Qatar Open (Doha, Qatar)
5. 2017 PBA-WBT Brunswick Euro Challenge (Munich, Germany)
6. 2018 DHC PBA Japan Invitational (Tokyo, Japan)
7. **2018 U.S. Open** (Wichita, Kansas)
8. 2019 PBA-WBT Kuwait Open (Kuwait City)
9. **2022 PBA Tournament of Champions** (Fairlawn, Ohio)
10. 2022 Storm Cup: Colorado Springs Open (Colorado Springs, CO)

=== PBA non-title wins ===
1. 2015 PBA World Bowling Tour Men's Finals
2. 2023 PBA Skill Ball Challenge
3. 2026 USA vs. The World (part of winning World team)

== Personal ==
Barrett now resides in Great Bentley, England. His wife Cassie gave birth to the couple's first child, a son named Colby Henry Barrett, on August 18, 2018.
