= Nina Flack =

Swedish bowler

Nina Flack is a Swedish bowler who was part of a gold medal-winning trio at the World Women's Championship of 2007. In 2013 she was among the fifty top-ranked female bowlers in Europe.
