= Barnsley Metrodome =

Sports and leisure facility in Barnsley, South Yorkshire, England

Coordinates: 53.5544°N 1.4707°W

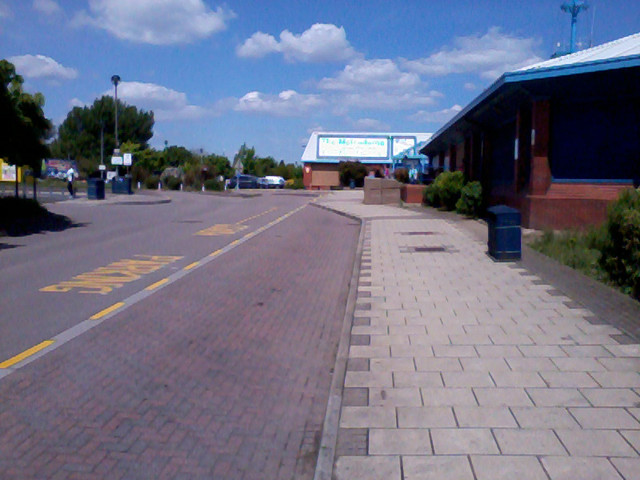
Barnsley Metrodome

The Barnsley Metrodome (Metrodome Leisure Complex) is a sports and leisure facility in South Yorkshire.

The facility is five minutes from the Barnsley Interchange and close to Junction 37 off the M1. It is located along Queens Road, Barnsley, South Yorkshire, in England. The metrodome has a water park called the Calypso Cove Waterpark and an arena and conference facilities. It also hosts concerts, sports events and is regularly home to major worldwide ten-pin bowling events, such as the Weber Cup and World Tenpin Masters.

== History ==
The venue was opened in 1989 by Neil Kinnock.

In 1999 the facility operated by BPL, a not-for-profit leisure trust was established. Also in 1999 the Arena hosted the prestigious Amateur Boxing Association Championships.

The Metrodome played host to the 2006, 2007, and 2008 World Tenpin Masters and the Weber Cup.

The facility previously hosted events on the Professional Darts Corporation's Pro Tour. The final event held was in 2024.
