= Tomas Leandersson =

Swedish ten-pin bowler (1966–2021)

Personal information
- Born: 11 April 1966
- Died: 2 November 2021 (aged 55)

Sport
- Country: Sweden
- Sport: Ten-pin bowling

Achievements and titles
- World finals: 1999 FIQ/World Tenpin Bowling Championships; 1994 World Tenpin Team Cup; 1993 World Games: Men's Singles title
- Regional finals: 1990 Nordic Bowling Championships; : gold; 1999 European Championships: men's singles title
Medal record
Representing Australia
Bowling
Event	1st	2nd	3rd
World Tenpin Bowling Championships	2	1	3
World Games	1	–	–
World Tenpin Team Cup	1	–	–
Total	4	1	3
World Tenpin Bowling Championships
Gold medal – first place	1991 Singapore	Masters
Gold medal – first place	1995 Reno	Doubles
Bronze medal – third place	1995 Reno	Trios
Bronze medal – third place	1999 Abu Dhabi	All-Events
Gold medal – first place	2003 Kuala Lumpur	Doubles
Silver medal – second place	2008 Bangkok	Doubles

Tomas Leandersson (11 April 1966 – 2 November 2021) was a Swedish ten-pin bowler.

== Biography ==
Leandersson was from Degerfors, Sweden.

Leandersson was a member of Team Sweden for over ten years, and was a member of the team that won the gold medal in the 1990 Nordic Bowling Championships. His team also won the 1994 World Tenpin Team Cup and the 1999 International Bowling Federation WTBA World Tenpin Bowling Championships.

Individual records and awards include the following:

- Winner of men's singles at the 1993 World Games and the 1999 European Championships
- Bronze medal, 1991 FIQ/WTBA World Championships Masters and 1999 All Events
- World Bowling Writers World Bowler of the Year in 1993
- Won the Bowling World Cup in 2000
- Elected to the World Bowling Writers International Bowling Hall of Fame in 2000
