= Bill Hoffman (bowling) =

American ten-pin bowler

Personal information
- Born: 1971 (age 54–55) Cleveland, Ohio, United States

Sport
- Sport: Ten-pin bowling
Medal record
Representing United States
Pan American Games
Gold medal – first place	2003 Santo Domingo	Doubles
Bronze medal – third place	2003 Santo Domingo	Individual

Bill Hoffman (born 1971), also widely referred to as The Joker, of Cleveland, Ohio, United States, is a Ten-pin bowler.

Hoffman, 29, finished 17th in his Bowling World Cup debut in Lisbon, Portugal, in 2000 . Hoffman qualified for his second Bowling World Cup in 2003 in Tegucigalpa, Honduras, where he rolled the only 300 in the tournament on his way to earning the top seed for the knockout elimination rounds. He eventually was eliminated in the semifinals . Hoffman won the 2007 Bowling World Cup on his third try. Held in St. Petersburg, Russia, Hoffman never was out of the top 5 throughout qualifying, eventually qualifying as the second seed for the stepladder finals. He went on to defeat Andres Gomez (2-0) and Jason Belmonte (2-1) to win the title. With his victory, he ended a 12-year winless streak of U.S. men in the Bowling World Cup . He is a graduate of Ohio State University, where he majored in international relations and political science. He has rolled several 300 games and has a personal-best mark of 857 for three games. Hoffman is averaging 225 in league and tournament play.

Bill Hoffman is a five time World-Champion, and has been inducted into the International Bowling Hall of Fame.
