= Tim Mack (bowler) =

American professional ten-pin bowler

Tim Mack, (born June 20, 1971) of New Jersey, USA, is a leading ten-pin bowler and bowling coach. He is right handed.

== Bowling career ==
Before he became a professional bowler, Mack was considered to be one of the best amateur bowlers in the world. He has won 70 titles in 30 countries on five continents, and is a five-time Amateur Bowler of the Year. In 2002, he won seven international championships, and was named the 2002 World Bowling Writers International Bowler of the Year as well as the BowlingDigital.com Player of the Year. He was a member of Team USA for 2003, winning a gold medal in trios and silver medals in singles, team and all-events during the World Championships in Kuala Lumpur, Malaysia.

He joined the Professional Bowlers Association (PBA) in 2003, making his debut in the Miller High Life Open at Hawthorn Lanes in Vernon Hills, Illinois. On May 31, 2009, he earned his first full-time PBA Tour exemption by finishing 8th at the PBA Tour Trials in Allen Park, Michigan.

Mack was the captain of Team USA in the Weber Cup, a famous USA vs. Europe annual bowling event, for several years. He has also managed the Portland Lumberjacks of the PBA League for multiple seasons, leading them to the Elias Cup team title in 2019, 2020 and 2022.

Mack won the BPAA's Dick Weber Bowling Ambassador Award in 2020 for his longtime work in promoting the sport of bowling. In 2021, he was invited to participate in the PBA's King of the Lanes event, mainly due to his connection to the host location, Bayside Bowl in Portland, Maine. At age 50, this was Mack's first television appearance as a bowler in over ten years. It was mentioned on-air that he has undergone seven knee surgeries since that time. Mack lost his only match to eventual King Jason Sterner, 267–204.

== Personal ==
Tim is married to Brenda (Norman) Mack, who was an exempt bowler in the PBA Women's Series. They currently reside in Greenwood, Indiana with their daughter. Tim is a member of the Storm Bowling professional staff, and is frequently seen laneside on PBA telecasts as a "ball rep" coaching Storm-sponsored players. He is also the European Sales Manager for Storm Products, and owns Tim Mack's Victory Lane Pro Shop which has locations at all three Royal Pin bowling centers in the Indianapolis area.
