= Guy Caminsky =

South African ten-pin bowler

Guy Caminsky (born July 4, 1977, of Durban, South Africa) is a South African ten-pin bowler. He finished in 13th position at the 2006 AMF World Cup and was crowned the 2008 World Tenpin Masters Champion as he defeated PBA Bowler of the Year Chris Barnes in a nail-biting finale. He has represented South Africa on numerous occasions which include the 2006 World Championships and the 1998 Commonwealth Games.

Guy Caminsky also owns a chain of bowling centres together with his father Stan Caminsky. The bowling centres are located in locations across South Africa, including Gateway Shopping Centre, Greenstone Shopping Centre, Pavilion Shopping Centre, and Windmill Casino. The chain is named The Fun Company.
