= Kirsten Penny =

English ten-pin bowler

Kirsten Penny is a professional English female ten-pin bowler. She has won numerous international events and regularly plays for Team England.

== Career highlights ==
Wins

- 2000 - Scott Banks Memorial Event
- 2001 - 2001 World Games mixed doubles gold medal
- 2001 - 10th Vodafone Malta Open
- 2002 - Scott Banks Memorial Event (2)
- 2003 - 15th Irish Open
- 2003 - 1st Indonesian Open
- 2003 - 29th Thailand Open Masters
- 2004 - Scott Banks Memorial Event (3)
- 2004 - 16th Irish Open
