= Tenpin bowling =

Type of bowling

- Ball contacts the 1, 3, 5, and 9 pins (sequentially tinted red) to achieve a strike.
- Highest governing body: International Bowling Federation
- First played: c. 1810 England (outdoors) c. 1820, United States

Characteristics
- Contact: No
- Mixed-sex: Yes
- Type: Ball sport, Target sport
- Equipment: Bowling ball, pins, lanes, bowling shoes
- Venue: Bowling lanes
- Glossary: Glossary of bowling

Presence
- Olympic: Demonstration sport in 1988
- World Games: 1981–2022

Tenpin bowling is a type of bowling in which a bowler rolls a bowling ball down a wood or synthetic lane toward ten pins positioned evenly in four rows in an equilateral triangle. The goal is to knock down all ten pins on the first delivery (a strike), or failing that, on the second delivery (a spare). While many people approach modern tenpin bowling simply as a recreational pastime, competitive bowlers consider it a demanding sport requiring precision and skill.

The 41.5-inch-wide (105 cm), 60-foot-long (18 m) lane is bordered along its length by gutters (channels) that collect errant balls. The lane's long and narrow shape limits straight-line ball paths to angles that are shallower than the ideal entry angle(s) for achieving strikes. Accordingly, bowlers impart side rotation to hook (curve) the ball into the pins to increase the likelihood of striking. A 15-foot (5 m) long approach area is used by the bowler to impart speed and apply side rotation to the bowling ball, and is separated from the lane by a foul line. Crossing this foul line is detectable via sensors and results in a score of zero for the delivery in league or tournament play.

Oil is applied to approximately the first two-thirds of the lane's length to allow a "skid" area for the ball before it encounters friction and hooks. The oil is applied in different lengths and layout patterns, especially in professional and tournament play, to add complexity and regulate challenge in the sport. When coupled with technological developments in bowling ball designs dating back to the early 1990s, easier oil patterns commonly used for league play have enabled many league bowlers to achieve scores rivaling those of professional bowlers who compete on more difficult patterns—a development that has caused substantial controversy.

Tenpin bowling arose in the early 1800s as an alternative to nine-pin bowling, with truly standardized regulations not being agreed on until nearly the end of that century. After the development of automated mechanical pinsetters, the sport enjoyed a "golden age" in the mid twentieth century. Following substantial declines since the 1980s in both professional tournament television ratings and amateur league participation, bowling centers have increasingly expanded to become diverse entertainment centers. In the 2020s, pinsetter cost and maintenance motivated some bowling centers to adopt string pinsetters.

When people use the bare term, bowling, they usually mean tenpin bowling. Tenpin, or less commonly, big-ball, are prepended in the English-speaking world to distinguish it from other bowling types such as bowls, candlepin, duckpin and five-pin.

== Facilities and equipment ==
=== Lanes ===
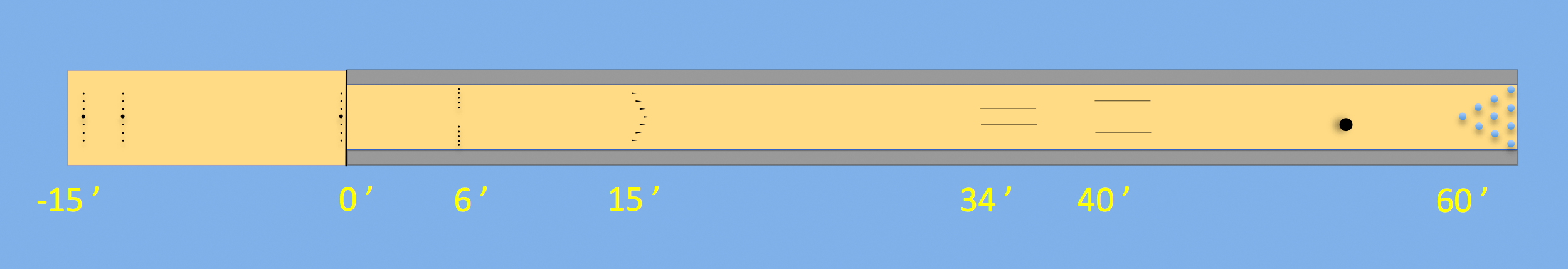
True scale diagram: In tenpin bowling lanes, the nearest pin is 60 feet from the foul line—more than 17 times the lane's 41.5-inch width. The optical illusion of foreshortening that a bowler experiences when standing on the approach causes pins to appear closer together and bowling ball angles of entry to appear more dramatic than they are in fact.

Tenpin bowling lanes are 60 feet (18.29 m) from the foul line to the center of the head pin (1-pin), with guide arrows (aiming targets) about 15 feet (4.57 m) from the foul line. The lane is 41.5 inches (1.05 m) wide and has 39 wooden boards, or is made of a synthetic material with the 39 "boards" simulated using marking lines. The approach has two sets of dots, respectively 12 feet (3.66 m) and 15 feet (4.57 m) behind the foul line, to help with foot placement.

Oil patterns, with greater oil concentrations represented by darker blues
(Horizontal scale is compressed.)

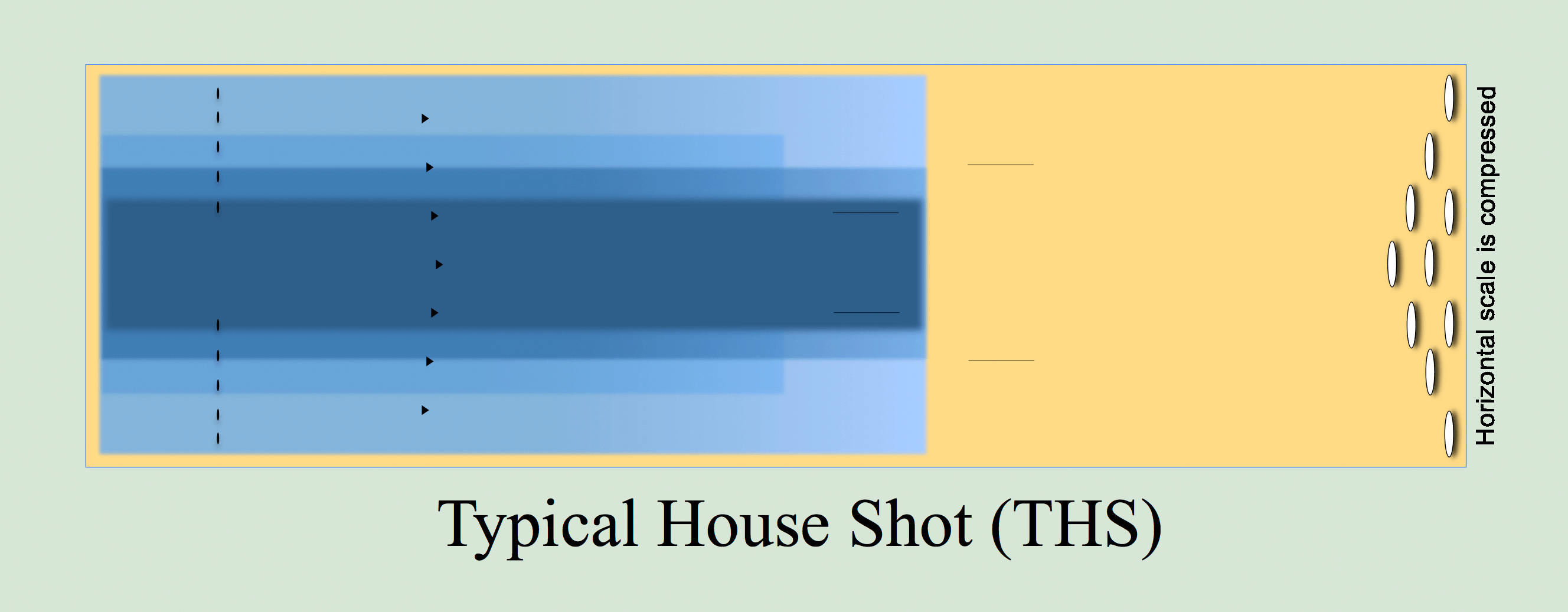
Simplified THS (typical house shot): relatively dry areas on the sides, and more heavily lubricated areas surrounding the centerline, help to guide the ball toward the pocket.

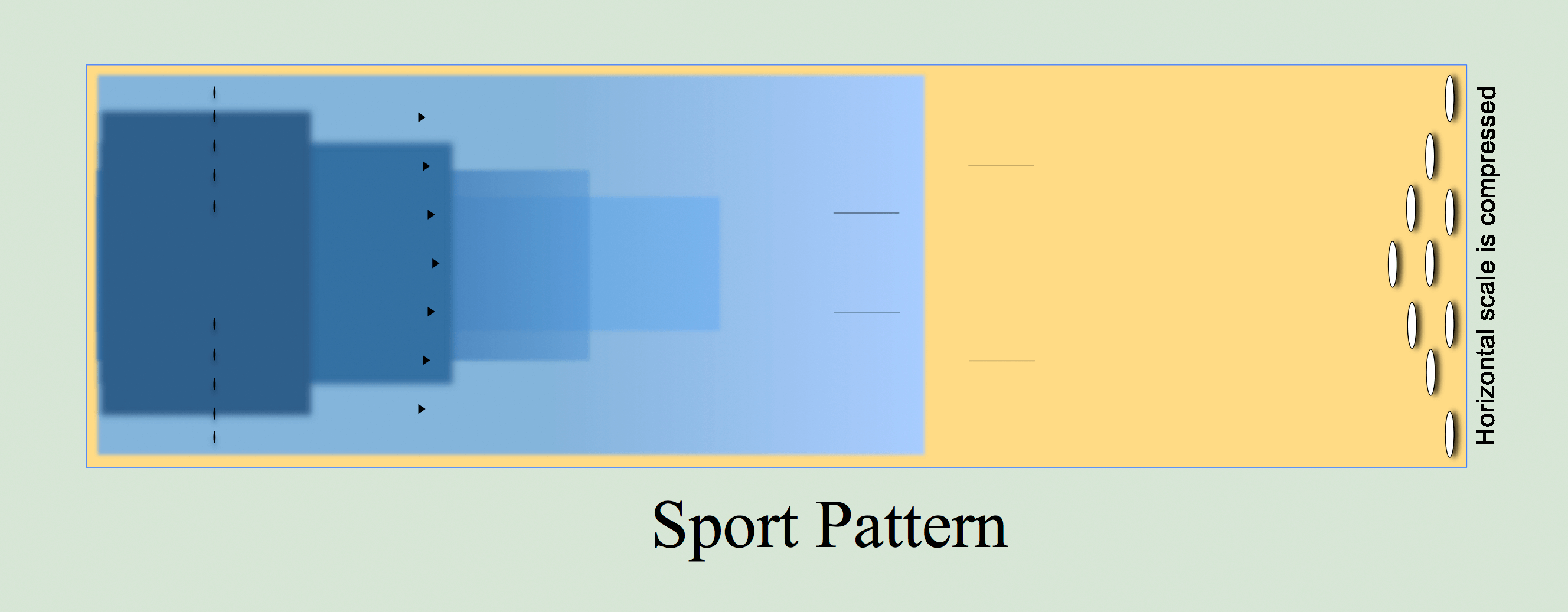
Simplified sport pattern: a "flatter" (more even) distribution of oil across the lane presents a greater challenge to hit the pocket.

Modern bowling lanes have oil patterns designed not only to shield the lanes from damage from bowling ball impacts, but to provide bowlers with different levels of challenge in achieving strikes. As illustrated, a typical house pattern (or THS, typical house shot) has drier outside portions that give bowling balls more friction to hook (curve) into the pocket, but heavier oil concentrations surrounding the centerline so that balls slide directly toward the pocket with less hooking. In the more challenging sport patterns used in tournaments and professional-level matches, a "flat" oil pattern—one with oil distributed more evenly from side to side—provides little assistance in guiding the ball toward the pocket, and is less forgiving with regard to off-target shots. The ratio of centerline oil concentration to side oil concentration (the oil ratio) can exceed 10-to-1 for THSs but is restricted to 3-to-1 or less for sport shots.

Lane oils, also called lane conditioners, are composed of about 98% mineral oil that, with numerous additives, are designed to minimize breakdown and carry-down that would change ball reaction after repeated ball rolls. Lane oils are characterized by different levels of viscosity, with oils of higher viscosity (thicker consistency) being more durable but causing balls to slow and hook earlier than lower-viscosity oils.

=== Balls ===
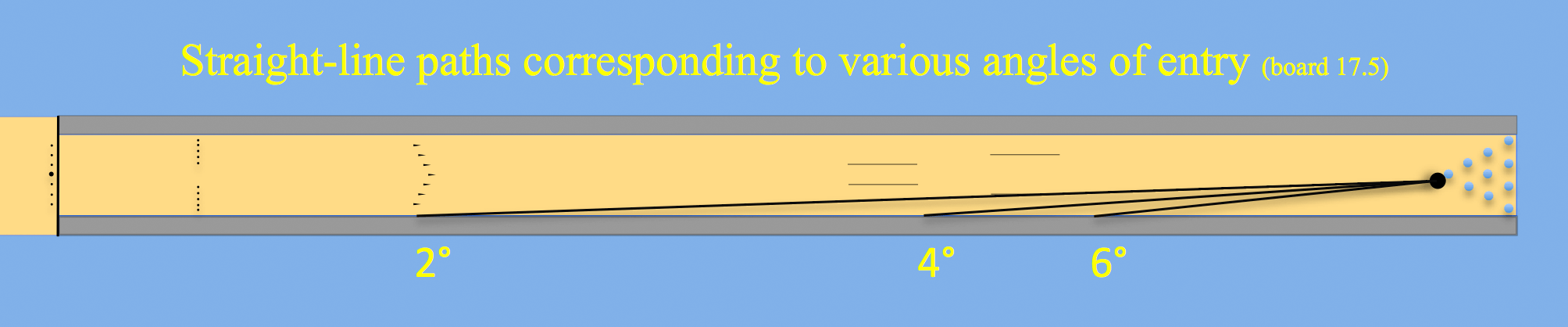
True scale diagram: A straight path, even one starting from the extreme outside corner of the lane, results in an angle of entry of at most 1.45°. Larger entry angles (shown in diagram) are achievable when hooking (curving) the ball. Larger entry angles have been shown to be generally more favorable for achieving strikes.

Rubber balls (introduced in 1905) were eventually supplanted by polyester ("plastic") balls (1959) and polyurethane ("urethane") balls (1980s). Coverstocks (surfaces) of bowling balls then evolved to increase the hook-enhancing friction between ball and lane: reactive resin balls arrived in the early 1990s, and particle-enhanced resin balls in the late 1990s. Meanwhile, the increasingly sophisticated technology of internal cores (also called weight blocks) has increased balls' dynamic imbalance, which, in conjunction with the coverstocks' increased friction, enhances hook (curving) potential to achieve the higher entry angles that have enabled dramatic increases in strike percentage and game scores.

Hook potential has increased so much that dry lane conditions or spare shooting scenarios sometimes compel use of plastic or urethane balls, to purposely avoid the larger hook provided by reactive technology.

The United States Bowling Congress (USBC) regulates ball parameters including diameter (between 8.500 and 8.595 inches or 21.59 and 21.83 centimetres), circumference (between 26.704 and 27.002 inches or 67.83 and 68.59 centimetres), and weight (maximum of 16 pounds or 7.26 kilograms, no minimum).

==== Ball motion ====
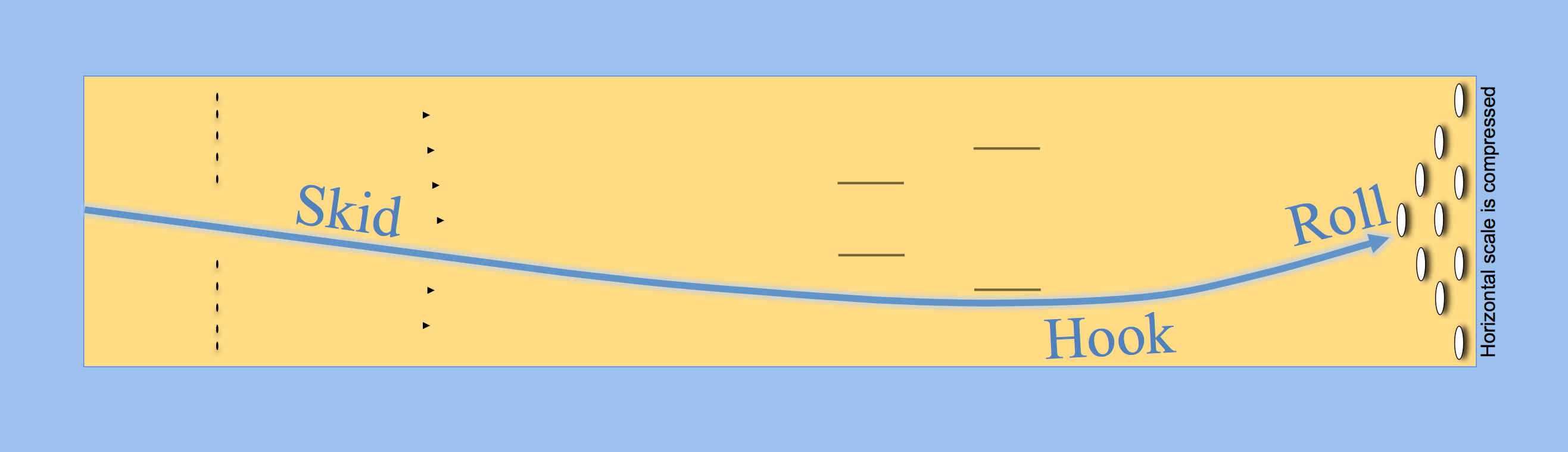
Simplified representation of the skid, hook, and roll phases of bowling ball motion. Technological advances since the early 1990s in ball design have allowed dramatically increased hook potential and strike frequency, without requiring additional skill on the part of bowlers. (Horizontal scale is compressed.)

Because pin spacing is much larger than ball size, it is impossible for the ball to contact all pins. Therefore, a tactical shot is required, which would result in a chain reaction of pins hitting other pins (called pin scatter). In what is considered an ideal strike shot, the ball contacts only the 1, 3, 5 and 9 pins (right-handed deliveries).

Most new players roll the ball straight, while more experienced bowlers may roll a hook that involves making the ball start out straight but then curve toward a target, to increase the likelihood of striking: USBC research has shown that shots most likely to strike enter the pocket at an angle of entry that is achievable only with a hook.

A complex interaction of a variety of factors influences ball motion and its effect on scoring results. Such factors may be categorized as:

- The bowler's delivery (see Effect of delivery characteristics on ball motion) Characteristics of the ball's delivery that affect ball motion include the ball's speed going down the lane, its rotational speed (rev rate), the angle of the ball's axis of rotation in horizontal and vertical planes (axis rotation and axis tilt, respectively), and how far beyond the foul line that the ball first contacts the lane (loft).
- Bowling ball design (see Effect of coverstock, core and layout on ball motion). A 2005-2008 USBC Ball Motion Study found that the ball design factors that most contributed to ball motion were the microscopic spikes and pores on the ball's surface (present in balls with reactive resin coverstock), the respective coefficients of friction between ball and lane in the oiled and dry parts of the lane, and the ball's oil absorption rate, followed in dominance by certain characteristics of the ball's core (mainly radius of gyration and total differential). Friction-related factors may be categorized as chemical friction (degree of "stickiness" designed by manufacturers into the resin coverstock) and physical friction (which can be modified by sanding or polishing, or by including additives that physically increase lubrication). "Weak" (pin down) versus "strong" (pin up) layouts of the finger and thumb holes with respect to core orientation affect skid lengths and hook angularity.
- Lane conditions (see Effect of lane characteristics on ball motion). Lane conditions that affect ball motion include lane transition (including breakdown and carry-down), the oil absorption characteristics of previously thrown balls and the paths they followed, wood versus synthetic composition of the lane (more generally: soft vs. hard lanes), imperfections in lane surface (topography), and oil viscosity (thick or thin consistency; innate viscosity being affected by temperature and humidity).

=== Pins and pin carry ===
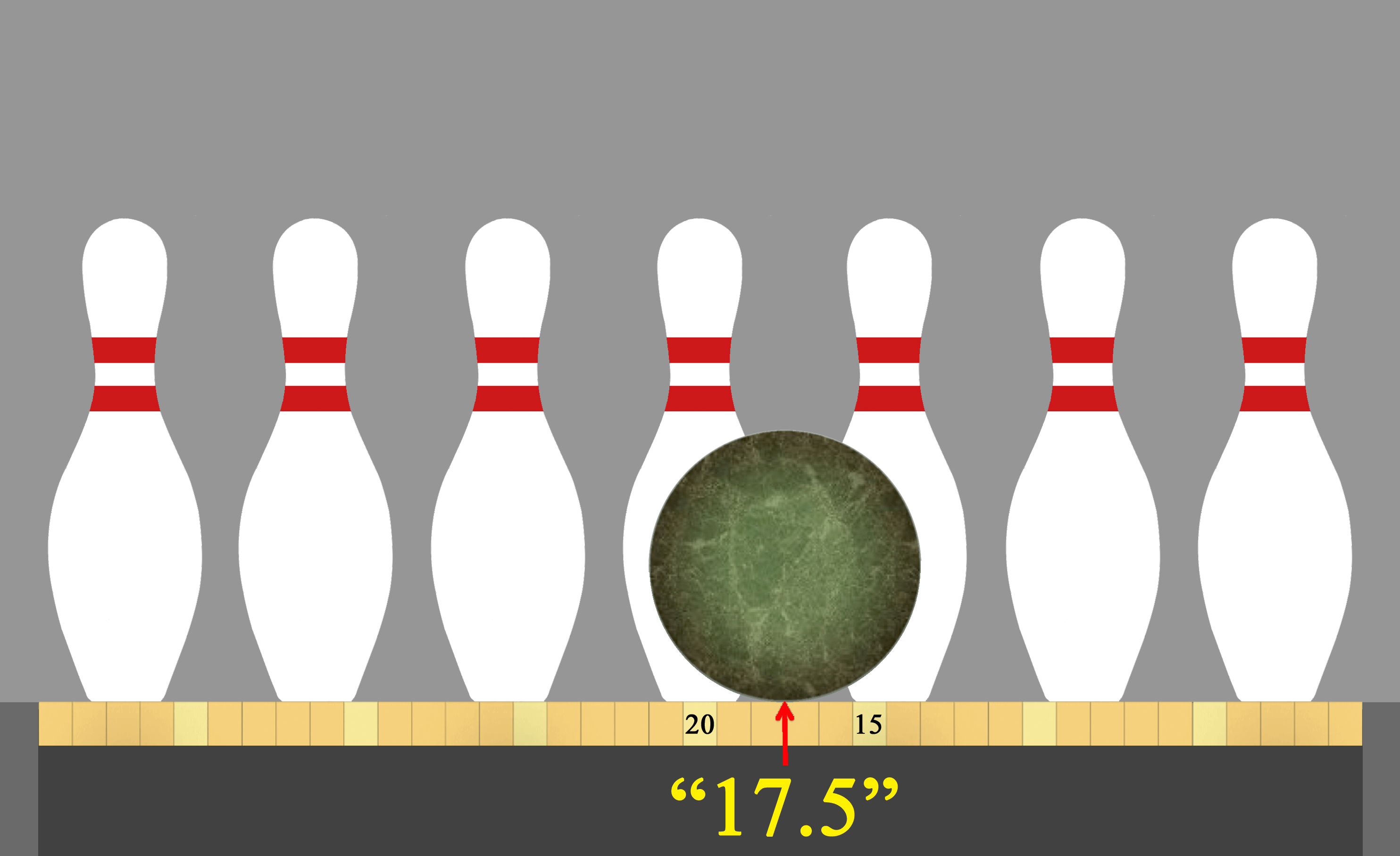
Front view: the ball impacts center pocket at "board 17.5"—found by a USBC pin-carry study to maximize strike probability. The ideal impact point is closer to the center of the head pin than many believe.

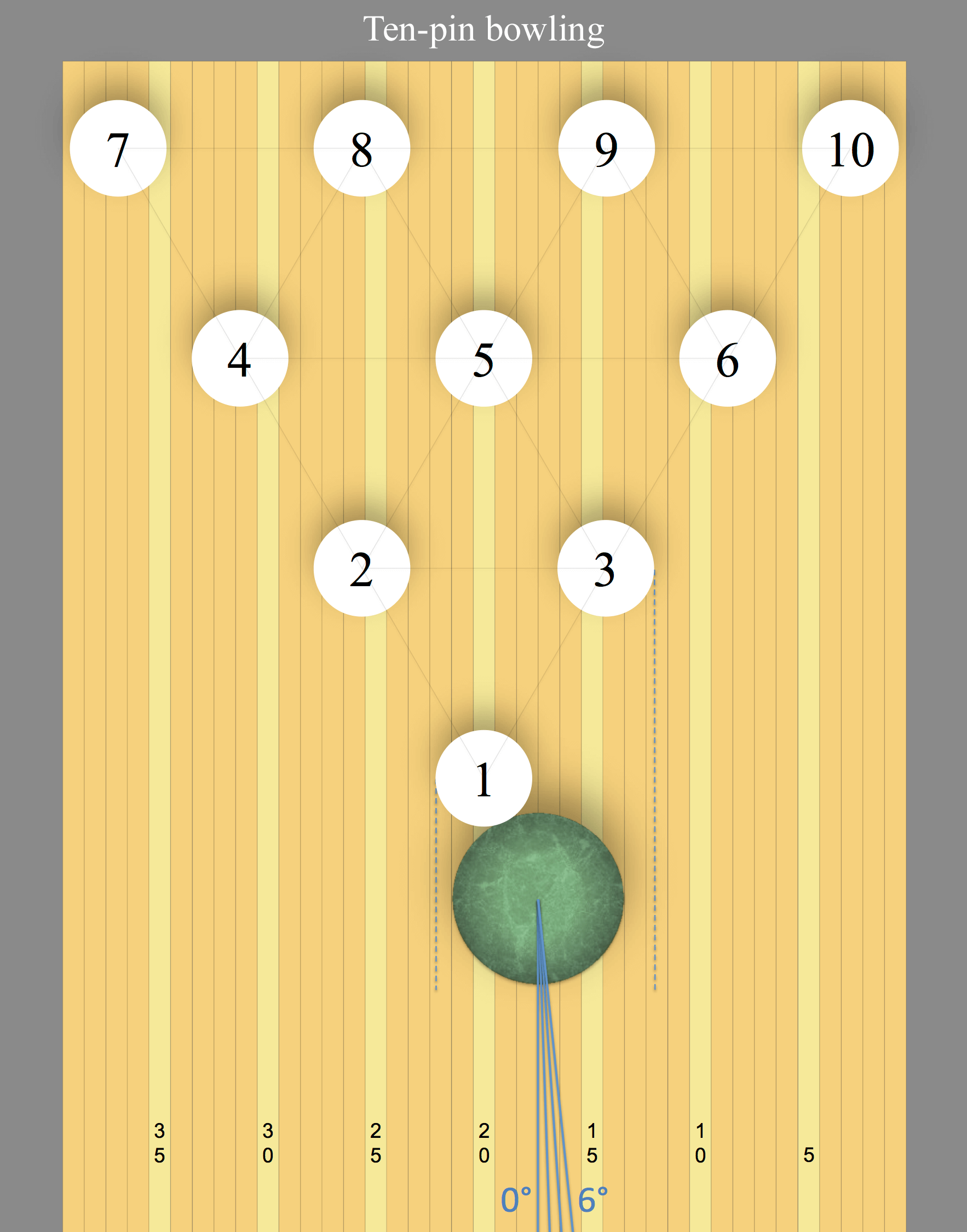
Top view: Ideal impact for strike

USBC study results indicating "board 17.5" to be the ideal ball location to achieve strikes, with higher entry angles (shown) and heavier balls (not shown) generally improving chances of striking

Bowling pins (with a maximum thickness of 4.766 inches (12 cm) at the waist) are "spotted" (placed) in four rows, forming an equilateral triangle with four pins on a side to form a tetractys. Neighboring pins are centered 12 inches (30 cm) apart, leaving a space of 7.234 inches (18 cm) between pins that can be bridged by a bowling ball of regulation diameter (8.5 inches or 22 centimetres).

Pin carry—essentially determining the probability of achieving a strike if the ball impacts in or near the pocket—varies with several factors. Even before a 2008 USBC pin carry study, it was known that entry angle and ball weight affect strike percentages. The 2008 study concluded that an impact with the ball centered at "board 17.5" causes pin scatter that maximizes likelihood of striking. The material of the pin deck and "kickback" (side) plates was also found to materially affect pin carry.

== Ball delivery ==
=== Delivery style categories ===
Three widely recognized categories are stroker, cranker and tweener.

- Strokers—using the most "classic" bowling form—tend to keep the shoulders square to the foul line and develop only a moderately high backswing, achieving modest ball rotation ("rev") rates and ball speeds, which thus limit hook potential and kinetic energy delivered to the pins. Strokers rely on accuracy and repeatability, and benefit from the high entry angles that reactive resin balls enable.
- Crankers tend to open (rotate) the shoulders and use strong wrist and arm action in concert with a high backswing, achieving higher rev rates and ball speeds, thus maximizing hook potential and kinetic energy. Crankers rely on speed and power, but may leave splits rarely left by strokers.
- Tweeners (derived from "in-between") have styles that fall between those of strokers and crankers; the term is considered by some to include power strokers who combine the high rev rates of crankers with the smooth delivery of strokers.

==== Alternative deliveries ====
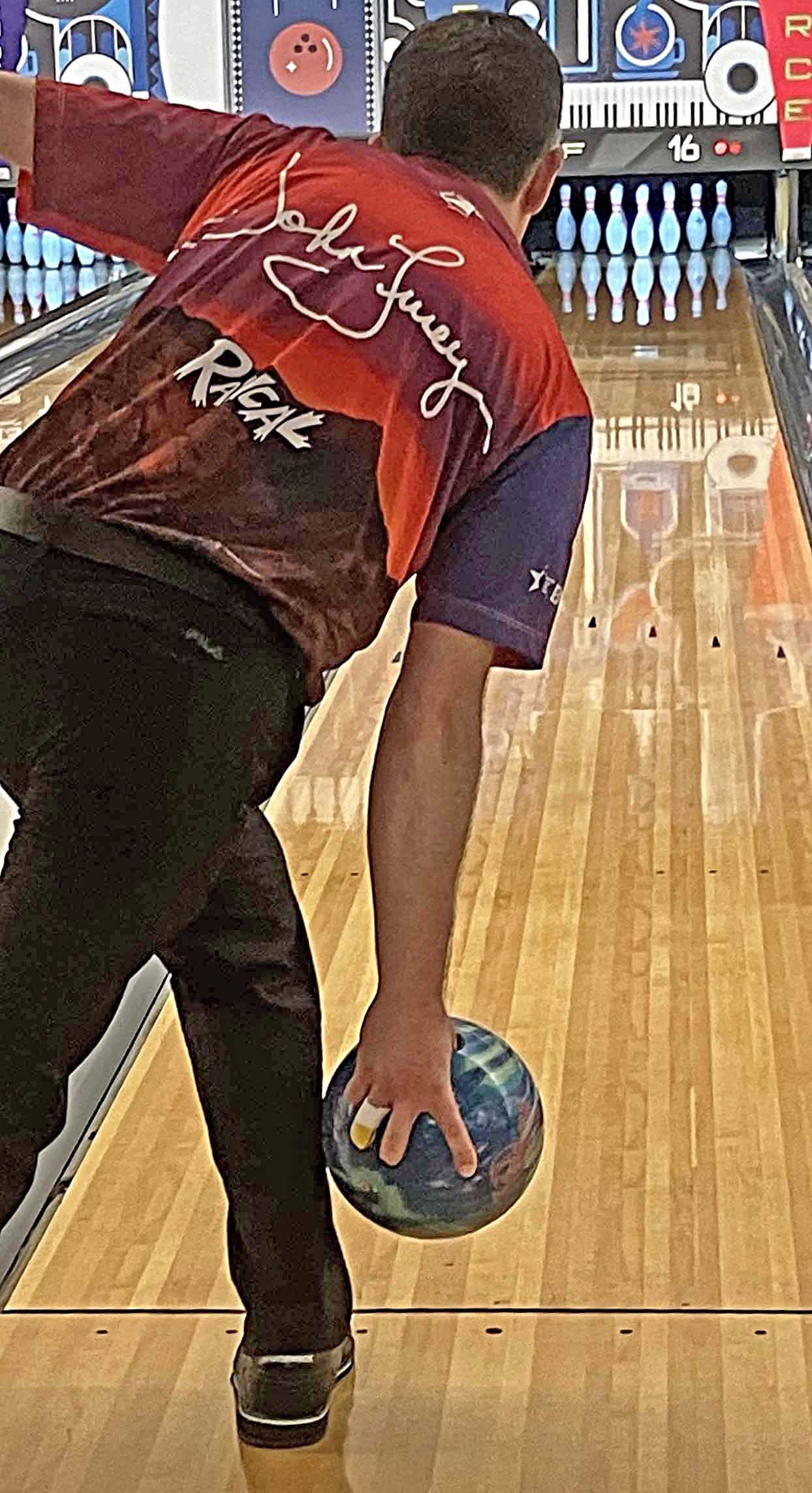
PBA bowler John Furey uses a conventional (one-handed) delivery. Finger rotation can induce axis rotation, causing the ball to hook (curve).

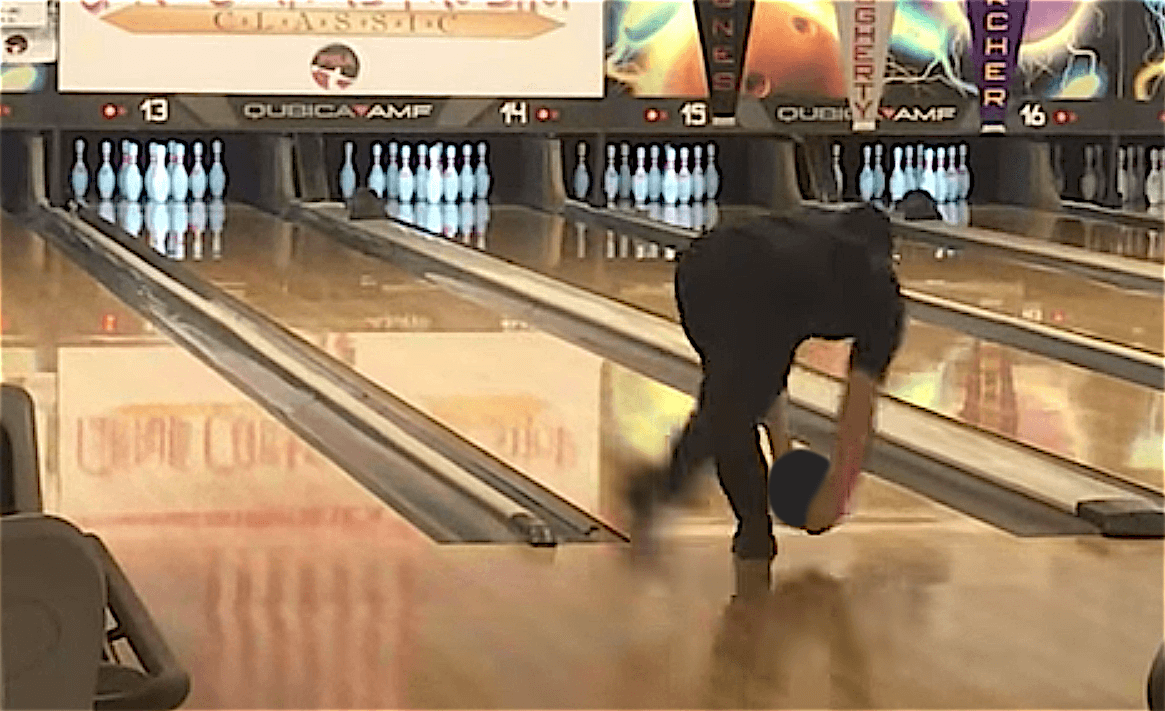
Two-handed delivery: Both hands retain contact with the ball until just before the release.
Though it is often incorrectly called a two-handed release, the actual release involves a single dominant hand for most bowlers.
For most two-handed deliveries, the thumb is never inserted into the ball in the first place, allowing a high rev rate and resultant hook.
(shown: Zach Wilkins)

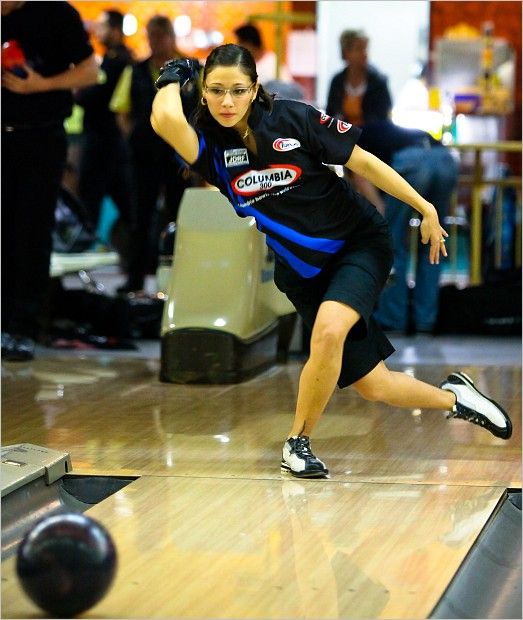
Delivery styles often involve a long follow-through and widely extended balance arm and leg. (shown: Clara Guerrero)

Video: The two-handed delivery, widely popularized by Jason Belmonte, increases potential rev rate and hook.
(shown: Zach Wilkins)

- So-called two-handed bowling, first popularized late in the 2000s by Australian Jason Belmonte, involves not inserting the thumb into any thumbhole, with the opposite hand supporting and guiding the ball throughout almost the entire forward swing. This delivery style, involving more athletic ability, is increasingly popular with younger bowlers and technically still involves a one-handed release. It allows the inserted fingers to generate higher revolution rates and thus attain greater hook potential than with a thumb-in-hole approach. In contrast, in what is literally a two-handed delivery and release, children or physically challenged players use both hands to deliver the ball forward from between the legs or from the chest.
- No-thumb bowling involves only a single hand during the forward swing, without the thumb inserted. The ball is often balanced on the wrist and forearm of the delivery hand for this technique. A successful professional who uses the one-handed no-thumb delivery is Tom Daugherty.

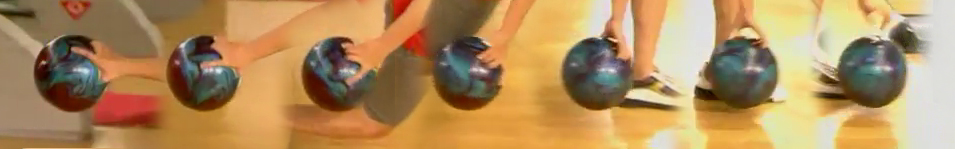
The "UFO" or "helicopter" release: the thumb faces the body, while the middle and ring fingers face the pins.

- The spinner style, which is mainly popular in parts of Asia, has a "helicopter" or "UFO" release that involves rotating the wrist to impart a high (vertical) axis of rotation that causes the bowling ball to spin like a top while traveling straight down the lane. Usually involving a lighter (10–12 pound) ball, the spinner style takes advantage of the ball deflection from the head pin to then "walk down" the other visible pins and cause domino effects diagonally through the pins.
- In the backup (or reverse hook) release, the wrist rotates clockwise (for right hand releases) or counter-clockwise (for left hand releases), causing the ball to hook in a direction opposite to that of conventional releases.

=== Grips ===
A conventional grip, used on non-customized house balls and some custom-drilled balls, involves insertion of fingers to the second knuckle. A fingertip grip, involving insertion of fingers only to the first knuckle, enables greater revolution rates and resultant hook potential. A thumbless grip, often used by so-called "two-handed" bowlers, maximizes ball rotational speed ("rev rate").

== Pins and scoring ==
=== String pinsetters ===
In 2023, the USBC certified string pinsetters (SPs) without any score adjustment compared to mechanical freefall pinsetters (FFPs), while acknowledging that bowlers have slightly lower averages when using SPs. String pinsetters are less expensive and easier to maintain, motivating bowling centers to phase them in.

=== Traditional scoring ===
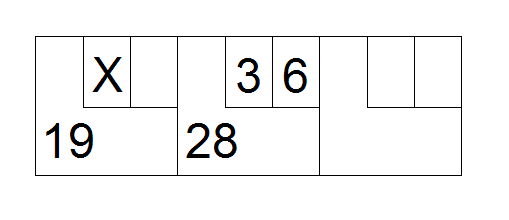
Traditional scoring of a strike:

Frame one: 10 + (3 + 6) = 19

Frame two: 3 + 6 = 9 → Total = 28

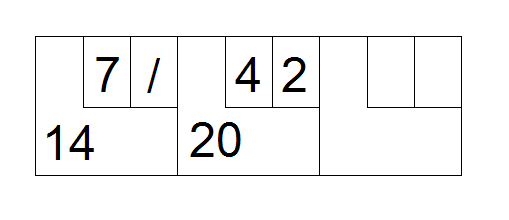
Traditional scoring of a spare:

Frame one: (7 + 3) + 4 = 14

Frame two: 4 + 2 = 6 → Total = 20

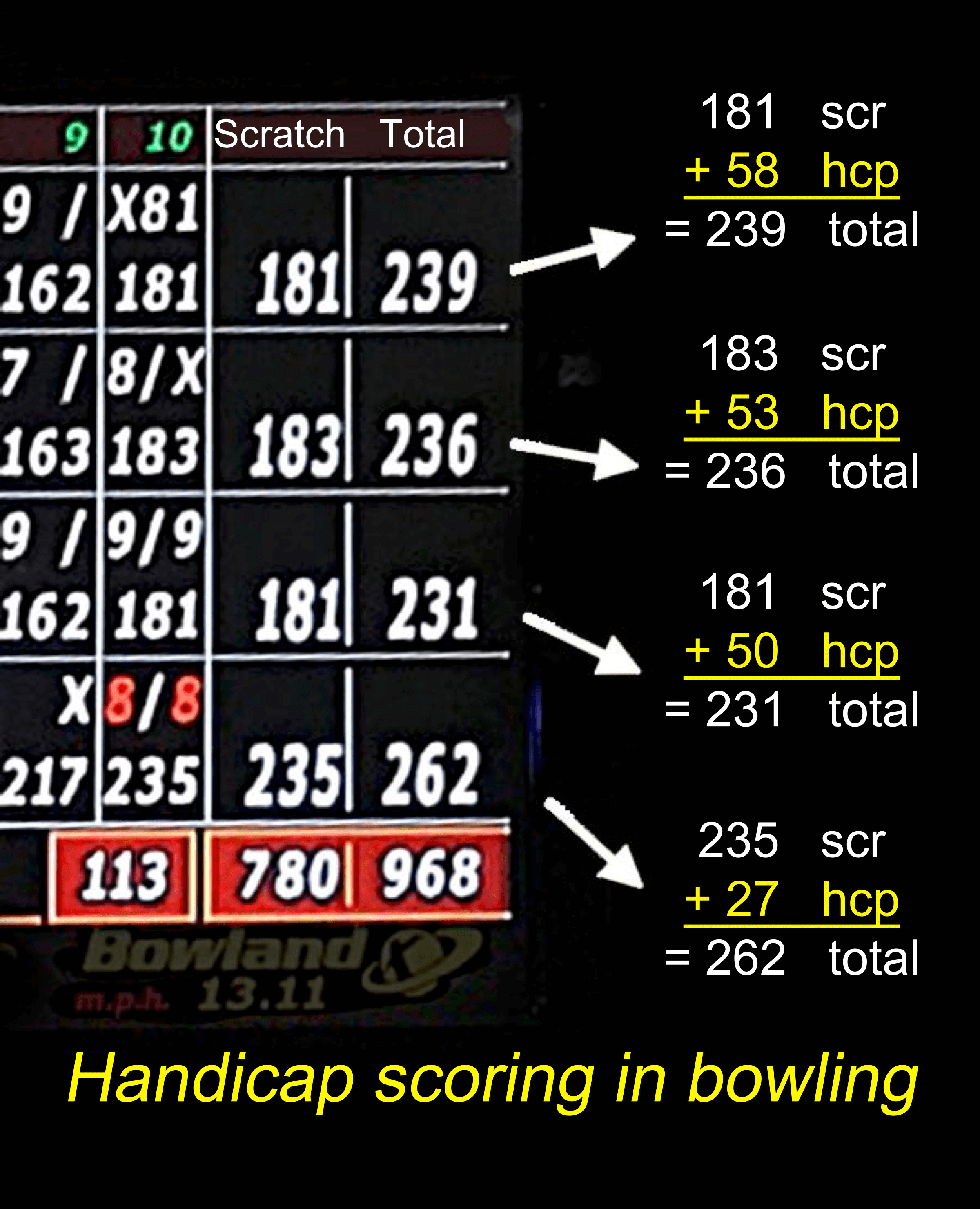
Though the second bowler's scratch score 183 is higher than the first bowler's scratch score 181, the first bowler's higher handicap (58 vs. 53) causes his total 239 to exceed the second bowler's total 236.

In traditional scoring, one point is scored for each pin that is knocked over, and when fewer than all ten pins are knocked down in two rolls in a frame (an open frame), the frame is scored with the total number of pins knocked down. However, when all ten pins are knocked down with either the first or second rolls of a frame (a mark), bonus pins are awarded as follows:

- Strike: When all ten pins are knocked down on the first roll (marked "X" on the scorescreen), the frame receives ten pins plus a bonus of pinfall on the next two rolls (not necessarily the next two frames). A strike in the tenth (final) frame receives two extra rolls for bonus pins.
- Spare: When a second roll of a frame is needed to knock down all ten pins (marked "/" on the scorescreen), the frame receives ten pins plus a bonus of pinfall in the next roll (not necessarily the next frame). A spare in the first two rolls in the tenth (final) frame receives a third roll for bonus pins.
- Split: When pins that have not yet been knocked down form a gap that is at least one pin apart, therefore making it very difficult to get a spare (marked by highlighting the number of the roll in red on the scorescreen).
- Gutter: When no pins are hit on a roll (marked "-" on the scorescreen).

The maximum score is 300, achieved by getting twelve strikes in a row within the same game (known as a perfect game).

=== World Bowling scoring ===
The World Bowling scoring system—described as "current frame scoring"—awards pins as follows:

- A strike is 30 pins, regardless of ensuing rolls' results.
- A spare is 10 pins, plus the pinfall on first roll of the current frame.
- An open frame is the total pinfall of the current frame.

The maximum score is 300, achieved with ten consecutive strikes (as opposed to twelve in traditional scoring), but with no bonus pins received in the tenth frame.

World Bowling scoring is thought to make bowling easier to follow than with traditional scoring, increase television viewership, and help bowling to become an Olympic sport.

==== Variant of World Bowling scoring ====
Another variant of scoring, a 12-frame system introduced at the November 2014 World Bowling Tour (WBT) finals, resembles golf's match play scoring in counting the greater number of frames won rather than measuring accumulated pinfall score. A frame may be won immediately by a higher pincount on the first roll of the frame, and a match may be won when one player is ahead by more frames than remain of the possible 12 frames. This variant reduces match length and scoring complexity for two-player matches.

== History ==
=== Early history ===
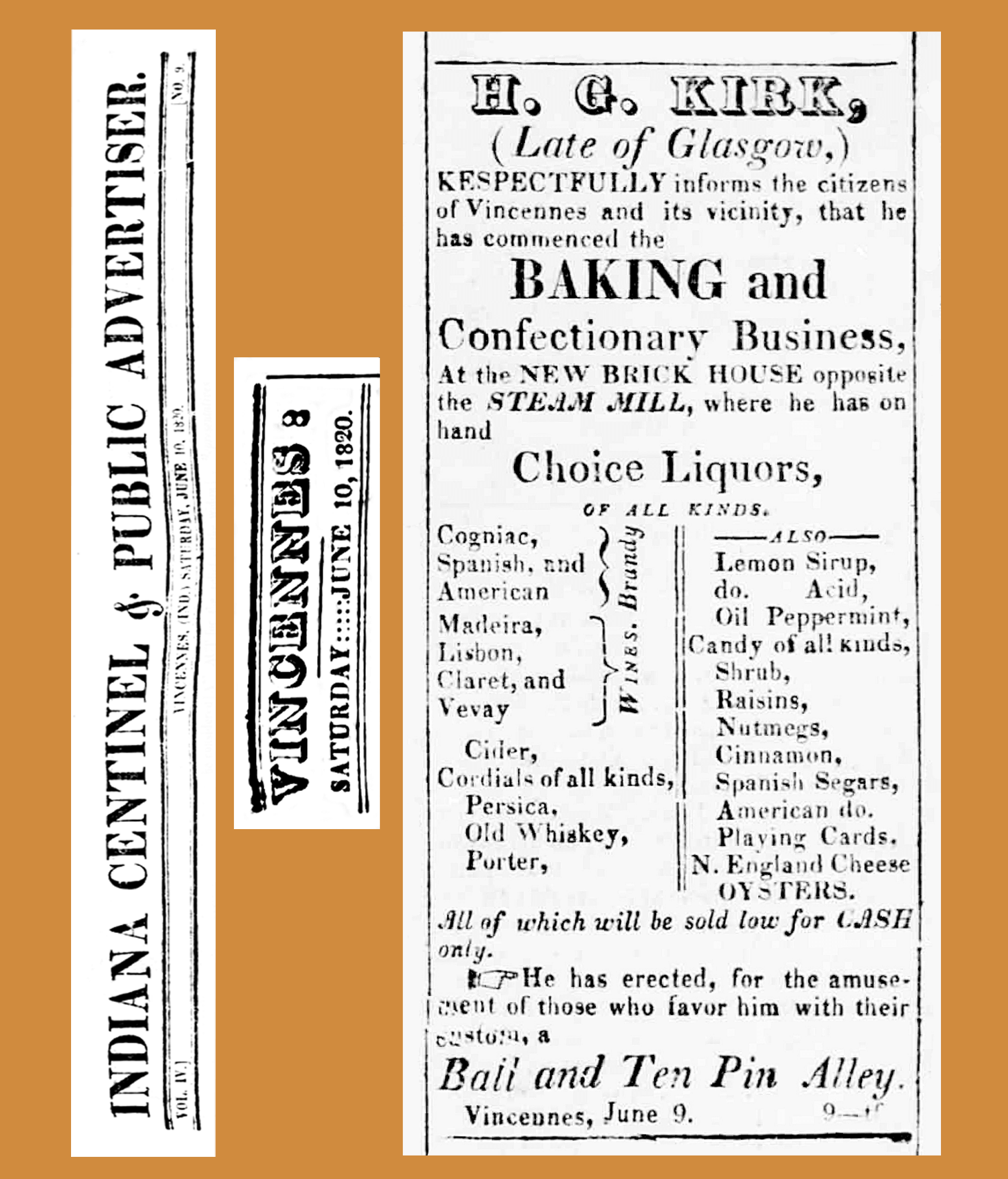
An early (1820) newspaper ad features a "Ball and Ten Pin Alley" to attract customers to a "Baking and Confectionary Business".

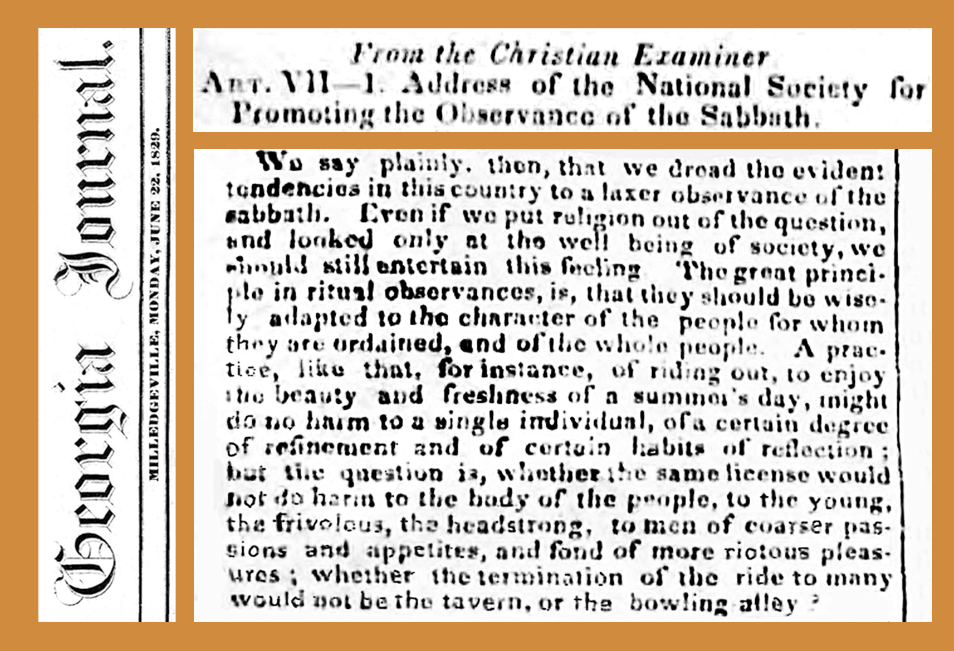
An 1829 newspaper editorial describes those who frequent bowling alleys and taverns: "the young, the frivolous, the headstrong, ... men of coarser passions and appetites, and fond of more riotous pleasures"—reflecting the often negative image bowling had.

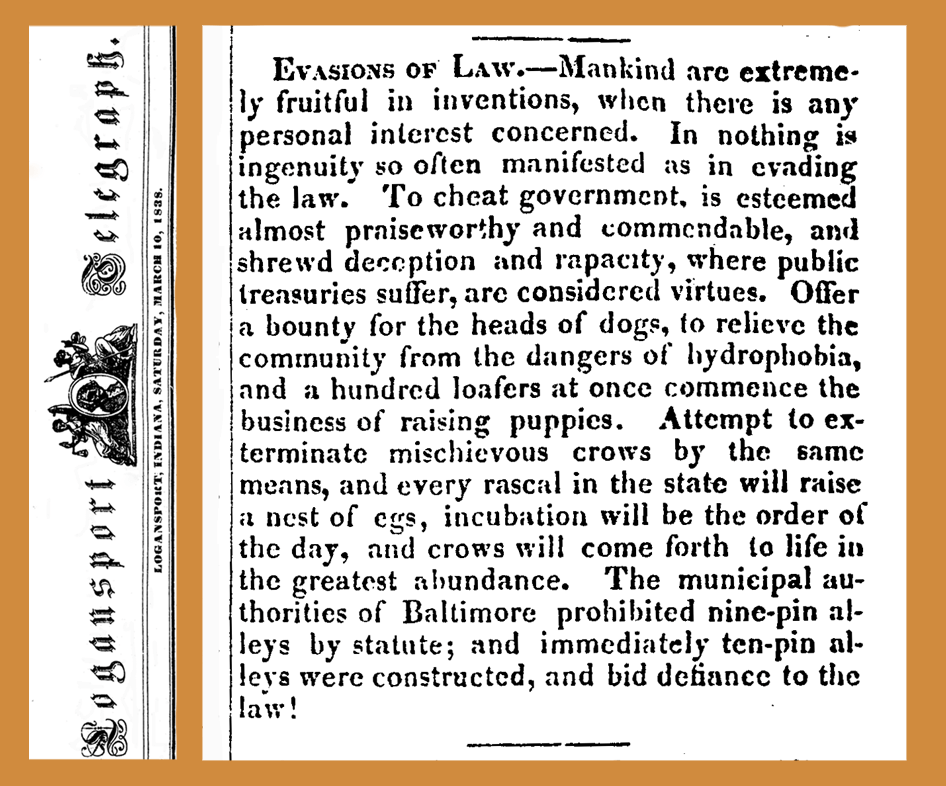
An 1838 Indiana newspaper describes how tenpin bowling was devised to evade a Baltimore statute prohibiting nine-pin bowling.

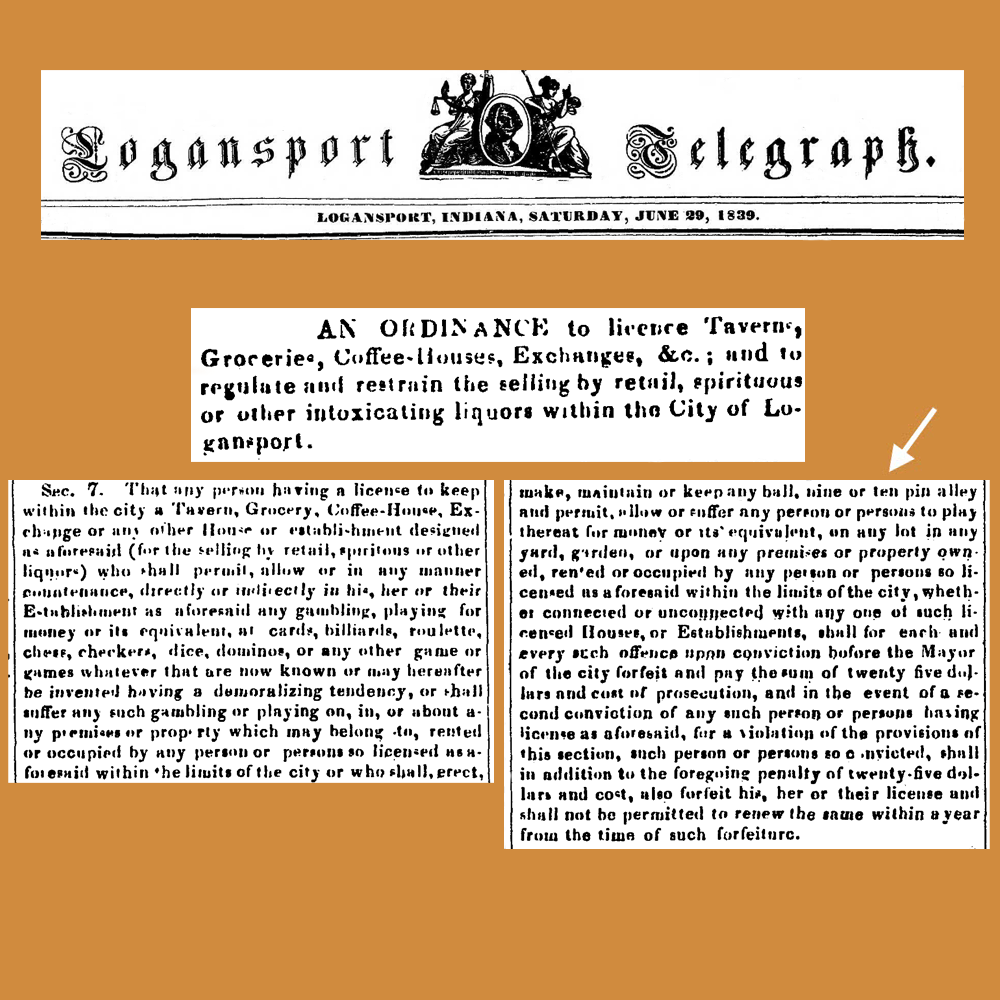
An 1839 liquor license ordinance prohibited gambling in "any ball, nine or ten pin alley"—associating bowling with gambling and games having a "demoralizing tendency".

Modern tenpin bowling derives mainly from the German Kegelspiel, or kegeling, which used nine pins set in a diamond formation. The enjoyment of kegeling by German peasants contrasted with (lawn) bowls that was reserved for the upper classes, consistent with tenpin bowling's enduring reputation as a common man's sport.

A circa 1810 painting of Ipswich, England, shows a man bowling outdoors with a triangular formation of ten pins. An outdoor version of tenpin bowling was advertised, also in Ipswich, at least as early as 1828.

An 1841 Connecticut law banned ninepin bowling because of its perceived association with gambling and crime, and people were said to circumvent the prohibition by adding a tenth pin. Other locations (e.g., 1838, re Baltimore and 1842, Charles Dickens re New York) also recount that strategy. Even earlier, an 1834 Washington, D.C. ordinance had limited the time (before 8 p.m. and not on Sundays) and place (more than 100 yards from inhabited houses) of "nine pin and ten pins" or "any game in the likeness or imitation thereof ... played with any number of pins whatsoever". U.S. newspapers referred to "ten pin alleys" at least as early as 1820 (also later in the 1820s and in the 1830s).

In the mid-1800s, various alternatives to free-standing pins received U.S. patents to solve perceived problems in pinsetting and ball return, aiming to avoid the need for human pinsetters to perform these functions. One scheme (1851) involved pins with spherical bases that when hit by a ball merely fell over, in place, to be rotated back to a vertical position. A second arrangement (1853) involved resetting the pins via cords descending from respective pin bottoms to weights beneath the pin deck. Another design (1869) involved suspending the pins with overhead cords.

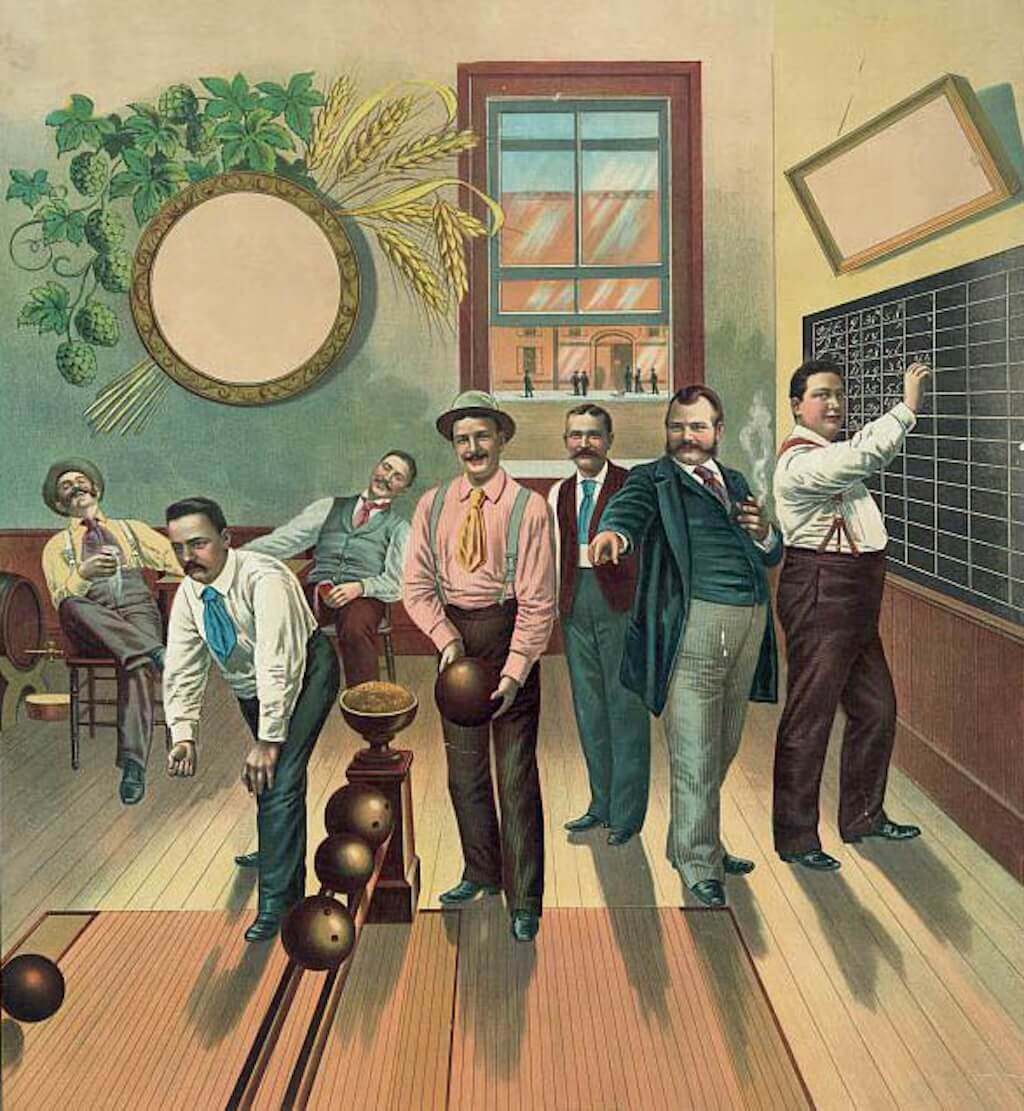
This 1894 depiction emphasizes the social nature of the sport. Balls of different sizes are used for games other than tenpin.

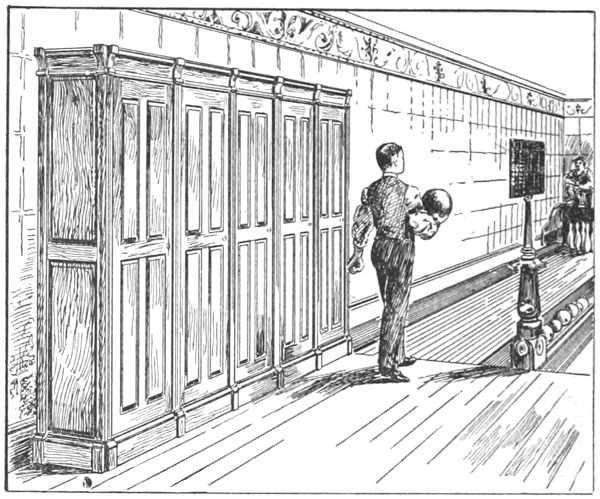
An 1895 advertisement for bowling lockers (price: $6.00 each section) suggests the attire and facilities used by bowlers of the era.

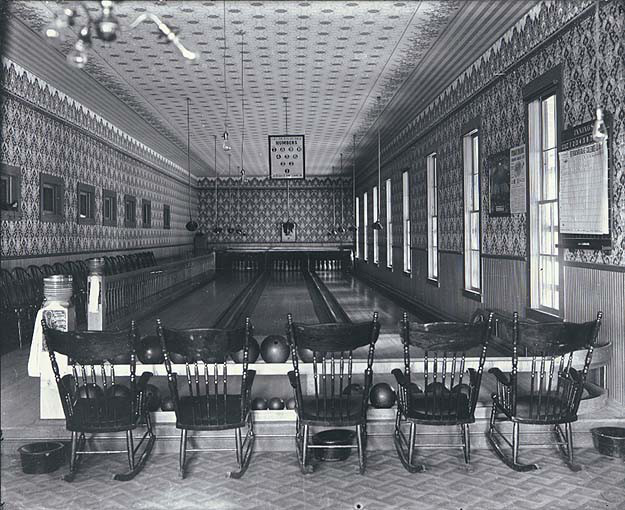
Bowling alley at the Pleasant Beach Hotel, Bainbridge Island, Washington (c. 1898)

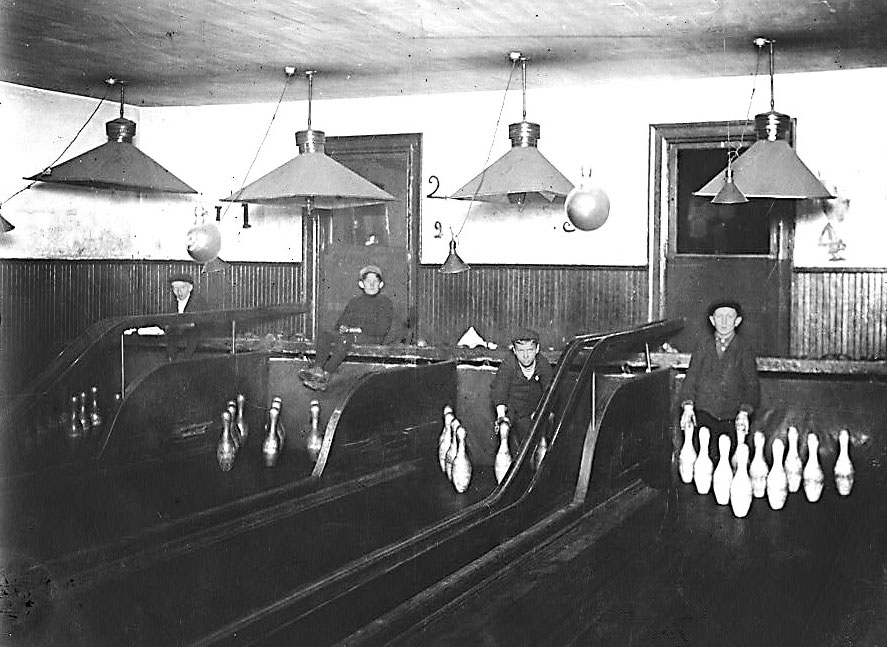
Human pinsetters (Pittsburgh, c. 1908) preceded automated mechanical pinsetters.

In 1884, the Brunswick Corporation became the first American bowling ball manufacturer, and by 1905 introduced the Mineralite (hard rubber) ball that was considered so revolutionary over wooden balls that it was displayed at the Century of Progress Exposition in 1934. In 1886, Joe Thum—who would become known as the "father of bowling"—began opening bowling alleys including at 401 Greenwich Street in the Tribeca West Historic District and over decades strove to elevate the sport's image to compete with upper-class diversions such as theaters and opera houses.

In 1875, delegates from New York City and Brooklyn bowling clubs formed the National Bowling Association (NBA) to standardize rules, but disagreements prevailed. In 1887 Albert G. Spalding wrote Standard Rules for Bowling in the United States, and in the mid-1890s the United Bowling Clubs (UBC) was organized with 120 members. The American Bowling Congress (ABC) was established in 1895, followed by the Women's International Bowling Congress (WIBC) in the 1910s, such organizations promoting standardized rules and striving to improve the sport's image.

From 1920 to 1929, the number of ABC-sanctioned alleys grew from 450 to about 2,000, with Prohibition leading to the growth of family-appropriate "dry" alleys. The 1933 repeal of Prohibition allowed breweries to sponsor teams and bowlers, adding to bowling's reputation as a working-class sport. Though at the turn of the twentieth century most bowling alleys were small establishments, post-Prohibition bowling lanes shifted from side entertainment at fancy Victorian venues or seedier saloons to independent establishments that embraced the Art Deco style and fit the era's perceived "need for speed".

=== 1940s to early 1960s ===
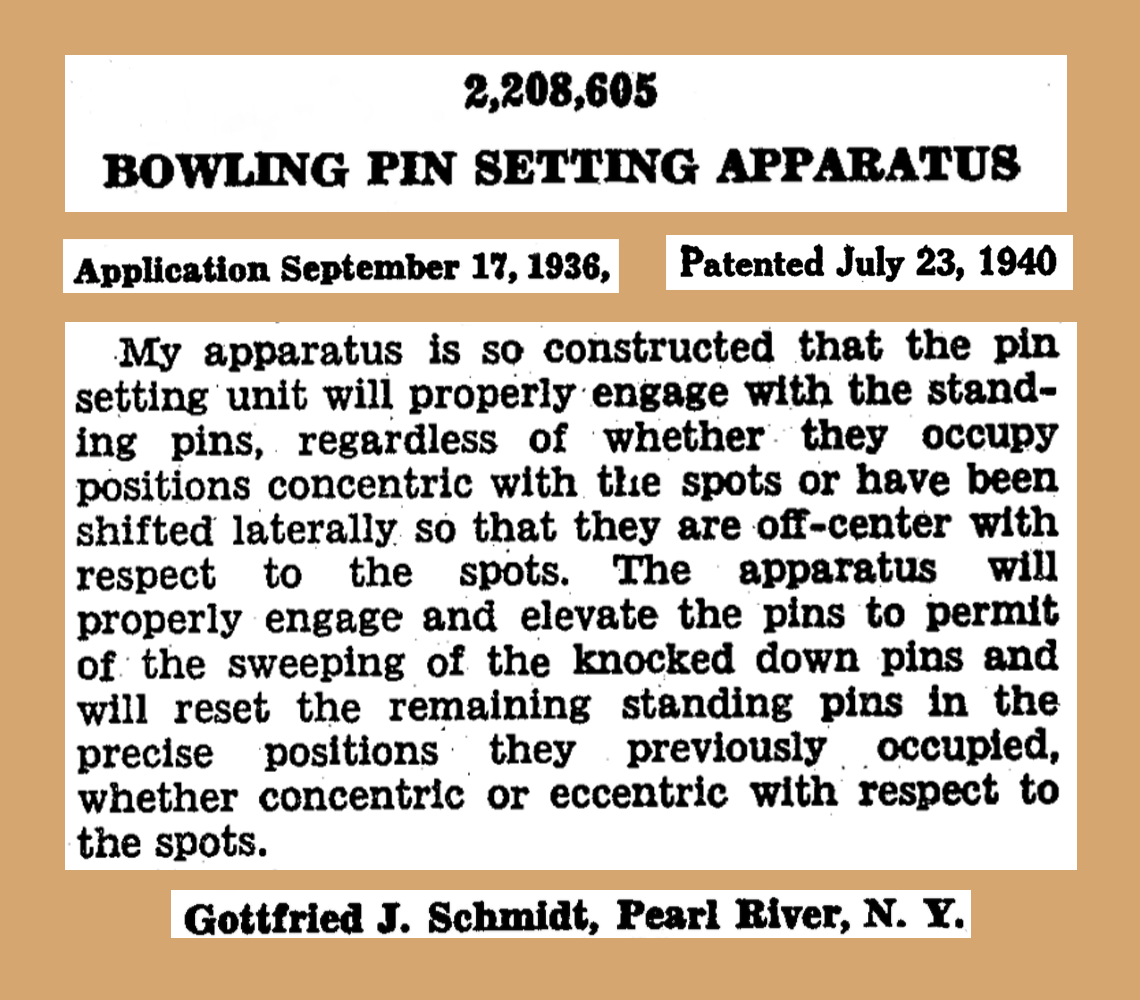
Actual text from one of Gottfried Schmidt's patents, this one from an application filed in 1936 and describing how his "bowling pin setting apparatus" can pick up and replace pins even if they were off their proper spots

Gottfried Schmidt invented the first mechanical pinsetter in his garage in 1936, one implementation of which was publicly exhibited in 1946 before AMF placed a production model into service in 1952.

Bowling in the U.S. flourished during World War II, when employers sponsored teams in industrial leagues to boost worker morale. The U.S. government's "Bowling for Health" campaigns promoted bowling for its health benefits, and the military made bowling centers a regular feature on military bases.

Initially, ABC and WIBC constitutions had banned non-Caucasians from membership. ABC bylaws had included a "white-males-only" clause since its inception in the 1890s, but numerous lobbying efforts and legal actions after World War II by civil rights and labor organizations led to a reversal of this policy in 1950. The National Negro Bowling Association, formed in 1939 and renamed The National Bowling Association (TNBA) five years later, had served minority bowlers before ABC and WIBC membership restrictions were removed in 1950. TNBA remains today, open to men and women without regard to race, creed or color.

The 1940s through the 1970s became known as the "golden age of bowling", with ABC membership growing from 700,000 (1940), to 1.1 million (1947), to 2.3 million (1958), to 4.5 million (1963), Women's International Bowling Congress membership growing from 82,000 (1940) to 866,000 (1958), American Junior Bowling Congress membership growing from 8,000 (1940) to 175,000 (1958), and sanctioned individual lanes growing from 44,500 (1947) to 159,000 (1963).

Bowling's growth was fueled by the deployment of automatic mechanical pinsetters by AMF (1952) and Brunswick (1955), television broadcasts (said to be "ubiquitous" in the 1950s), modernization and stylization of establishments with amenities to attract broader clientele, and formation of bowling leagues. Though President Truman had installed a bowling alley in the White House in 1947, a report of the American Society of Planning Officials in 1958 characterized bowling alleys as the "poor man's country club".

Sports agent Eddie Elias founded the Professional Bowlers Association (PBA) in 1958 with 33 members, and the first PBA tournaments began in 1959. The Pro Bowlers Tour TV program aired from 1962 through 1997.

In the 1930s and 1940s, professional bowling was dominated by "beer leagues" with many of the best bowlers sponsored by beer companies, but by 1965 the PBA tour was televised nationally on ABC Sports with sponsors such as Coca-Cola and Ford.

In parallel with professional bowling was "action bowling" or "pot bowling"—bowling matches based on monetary bets—historically associated with the New York underworld from the 1940s to the 1970s.

=== Late 1960s to 1980 ===
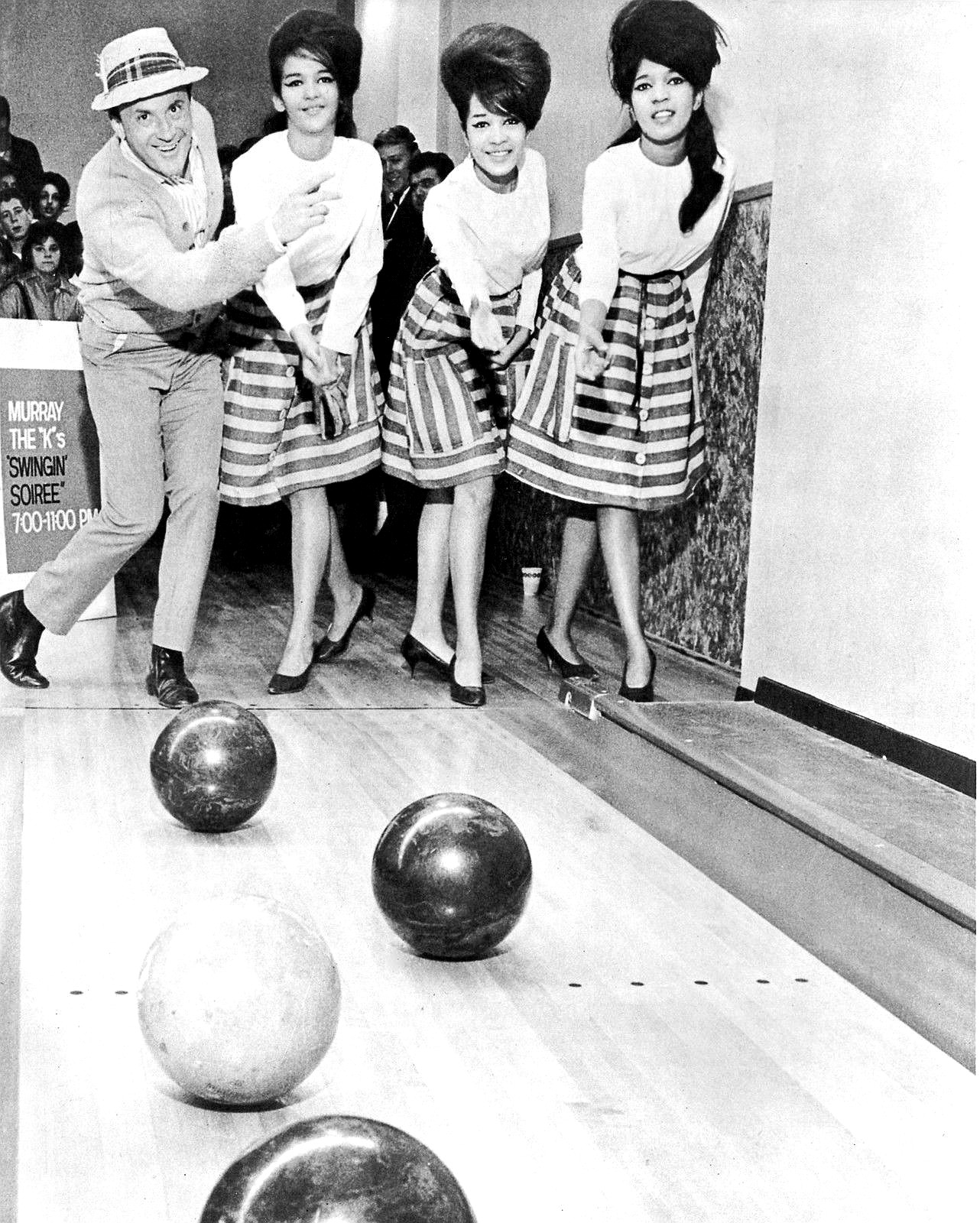
The Ronettes and New York disc jockey Murray the K using bowling as a promotional device in 1962, during the "golden age of bowling"

The first ten-pin lanes in Europe had been installed in Sweden in 1909, but attempts to popularize the sport in Europe were unsuccessful over the next several decades, though hundreds of lanes were installed on U.S. military bases in the U.K. during World War II. Various countries developed the sport to some extent, and the Fédération Internationale des Quilleurs (FIQ; now World Bowling) was formed in 1952 to coordinate international amateur competition.

A firmer establishment of the sport began in the U.K. in 1960 in London (Stamford Hill) in January 1960, and the British Tenpin Bowling Association (BTBA) was formed the following year. The first British made tenpin was by H Massil and sons who received the permit no.1 from the BTBA. Various other countries, including Australia, Mexico and Japan, adopted the trend over the ensuing decade. After initial faddish growth in the U.K., however, the sport did not thrive as it did in the U.S., and by the 1970s many British bowling alleys were converted to serve competing pastimes, such as bingo.

The "Lane Master" automatic lane cleaning and conditioning machine was first deployed in the 1960s.

In the 1960s and early 1970s, top bowling professionals made twice as much money as NFL football stars, received million-dollar endorsement contracts, and were treated as international celebrities. The PBA's $100,000 Firestone Tournament of Champions launched in 1965, paying out a then-record $25,000 first prize (about $265,000 in 2026 dollars), in a decade that saw ABC membership peak at almost 4.6 million male bowlers. The number of sanctioned bowling alleys peaked at about 12,000 in the mid-1960s, mostly in blue-collar urban areas, and Women's International Bowling Congress (WIBC) membership peaked at 4.2 million members in 1979.

In the late 1960s, the participation sport of bowling found itself competing with spectator sports and outdoor recreational activities. The number of certified bowling centers was to eventually decline from its 1960s high of 12,000 to 6,542 in 1998 and 3,976 in 2013. The decline was noted acutely in waning league participation over the intervening decades.

=== 1980 to 2000 ===
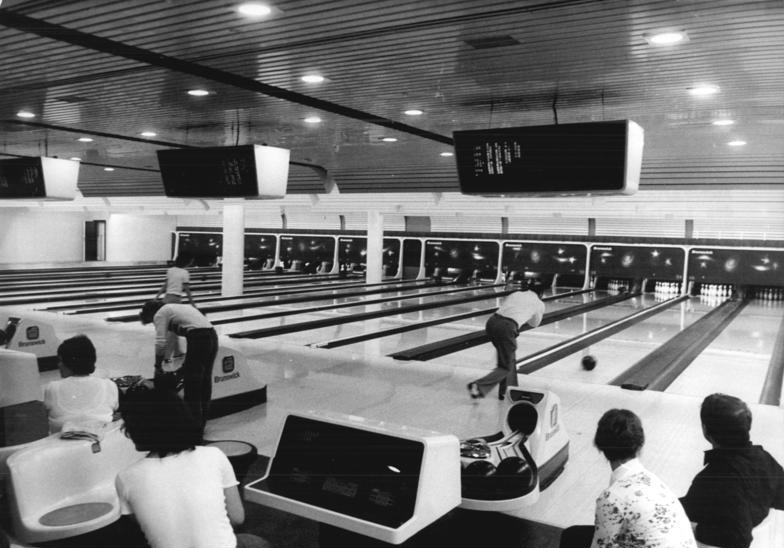
A bowling alley in Berlin (1981) with early electronic displays

League participation peaked in the 1960s and 1970s. League bowling was used as a barometer of social engagement in political scientist Robert D. Putnam's book, Bowling Alone (2000).

Tournament prize funds in the 1980s included the PBA National Championship ($135,000, its largest) and the Firestone Tournament of Champions ($150,000), and PBA membership approached 2,500. Ten-pin bowling became an exhibition sport at the 1988 Summer Olympics (Seoul), has been a medal sport since its debut at the 1991 Pan American Games (Havana), and was included in the 1998 Commonwealth Games (Kuala Lumpur).

Outside elite and professional bowling, participation in leagues—traditionally the more profitable end of the business—declined from a 1980 peak (8 million), compelling alleys to further diversify into entertainment amenities. As busier, two-earner households became more common in the 1980s to make league participation more difficult, the number of spectator sports and competing leisure time opportunities (jogging, tennis, skiing) grew. While league bowling decreased by 40 percent between 1980 and 1993, the total number of bowlers actually increased by 10 percent during that period, with nearly 80 million Americans going bowling at least once during 1993. In 1995, the National Bowling Stadium (Reno, Nevada) was constructed at a cost of $47.5 million, but the PBA Pro Bowlers Tour TV program was canceled in 1997 after a 35-year run.

In 1991, equipment manufacturer DBA Products released "The Lane Walker"—the first computer-driven lane cleaning and oiling machine, programmable to clean up to 50 lanes.

The early 1990s brought the development of reactive resin ("reactive") balls with chemically "tacky" surfaces that enhance traction to dramatically enhance hook and substantially increase the likelihood of striking, raising average scores even for less experienced bowlers.

In 1998, the Sporting Goods Manufacturers Association (SGMA) president attributed an increase in popularity to bowling alley remodeling, technological innovations in balls and lanes, computerized scoring, and promotion by bowling organizations.

=== 2000 to present ===
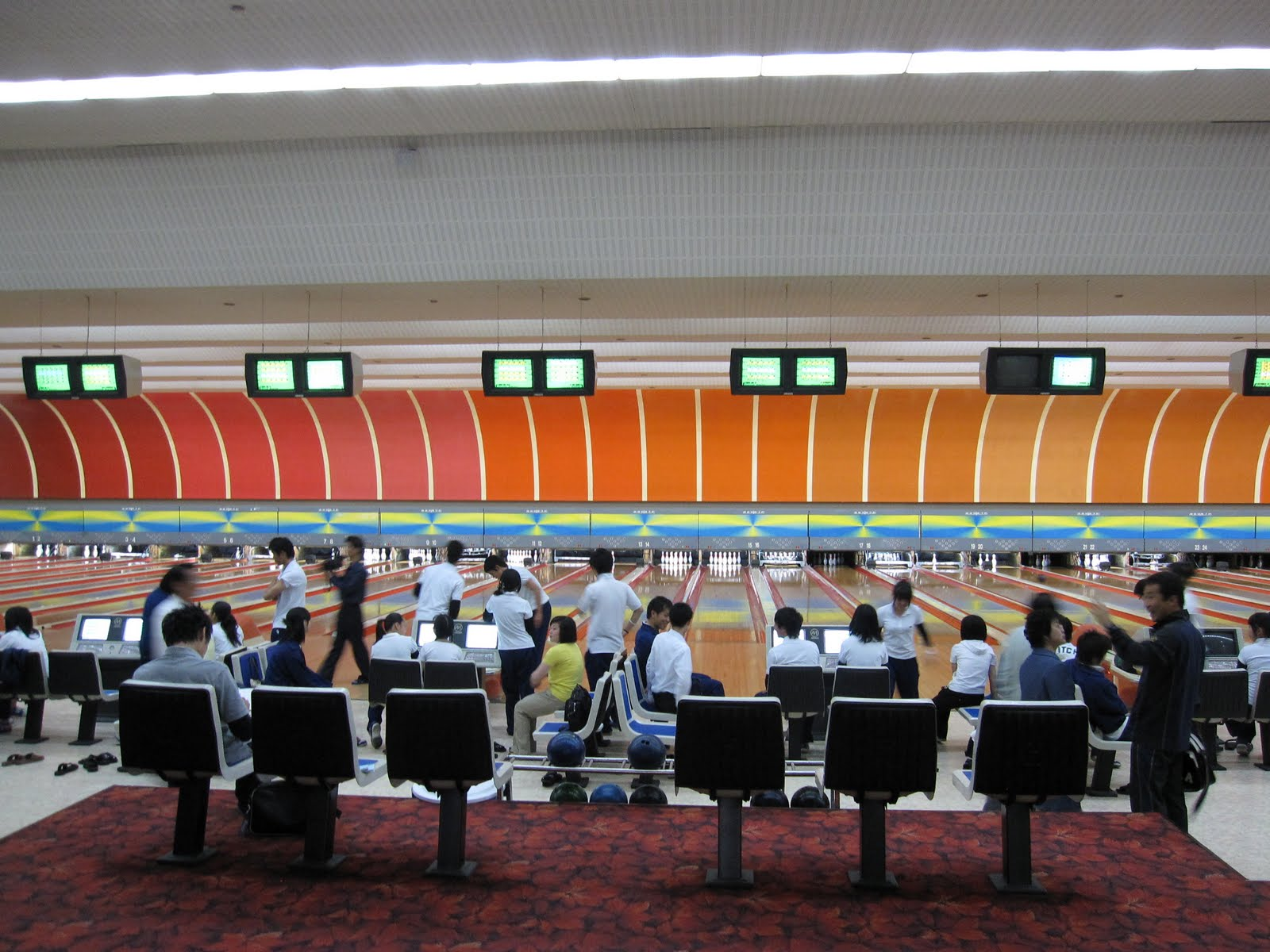
Example of a modern bowling alley in Pyongyang (2010)

In 2023, the USBC began certifying string pinsetters, which are being installed in a growing number of bowling centers because of their reduced cost and maintenance requirements.

- External video
- YouTube short: String pinsetter operation

From 1998 to 2013, the number of American bowling centers fell by one quarter. Similarly, in the two decades following 1997, the number of USBC-certified lanes—also indicative of business viability—declined by one-third. This business decline is often attributed to waning league participation: USBC membership—indicative of league participation that was the main source of revenue—declined by two-thirds in those two decades, and the portion of alley revenue attributable to leagues is estimated to have dropped from 70% to 40%. Political scientist Robert D. Putnam's book Bowling Alone (2000) asserts, with some controversy, that the retreat from league bowling epitomizes a broader societal decline in social, civic and community engagement in the U.S.

As an indication of the decline, AMF Bowling, the largest operator of bowling centers in the world at the time, filed for Chapter 11 bankruptcy in 2001, and again in 2012. By 2013, AMF Bowling had merged with New York–based Bowlmor (no relation to the defunct, 1940s-founded Bowl-Mor firm that invented the automatic pinsetter for candlepin bowling), the company becoming known as Bowlmor AMF.

In 2000, three former tech industry executives bought a debt-laden PBA—which saw its 36-year television contract with ABC Sports end in 1997—and turned it from a non-profit league into a for-profit organization, and invested heavily in marketing. The January 2005 merger of four U.S. bowling organizations to form the USBC formed a "central brand" aiming to grow the sport. Beginning late in the decade of the 2000s, the two-handed approach became popularized, first by Australian Jason Belmonte, with some hoping that the controversial delivery style would boost popularity of the sport. In January 2013, the eight-team PBA League began competition, the strategy being that basing teams in specific geographic localities would generate viewer enthusiasm and corporate sponsorship in the same manner as teams in other professional sports. Still, continuing the reversal of bowling's peak popularity in the 1960s, in the 2012–2013 season the average yearly winnings of the ten highest-earning PBA competitors was less than US$155,000, and the average for the remaining 250 competitors was $6,500—all much less than a rookie NFL football player's minimum base salary of $375,000.

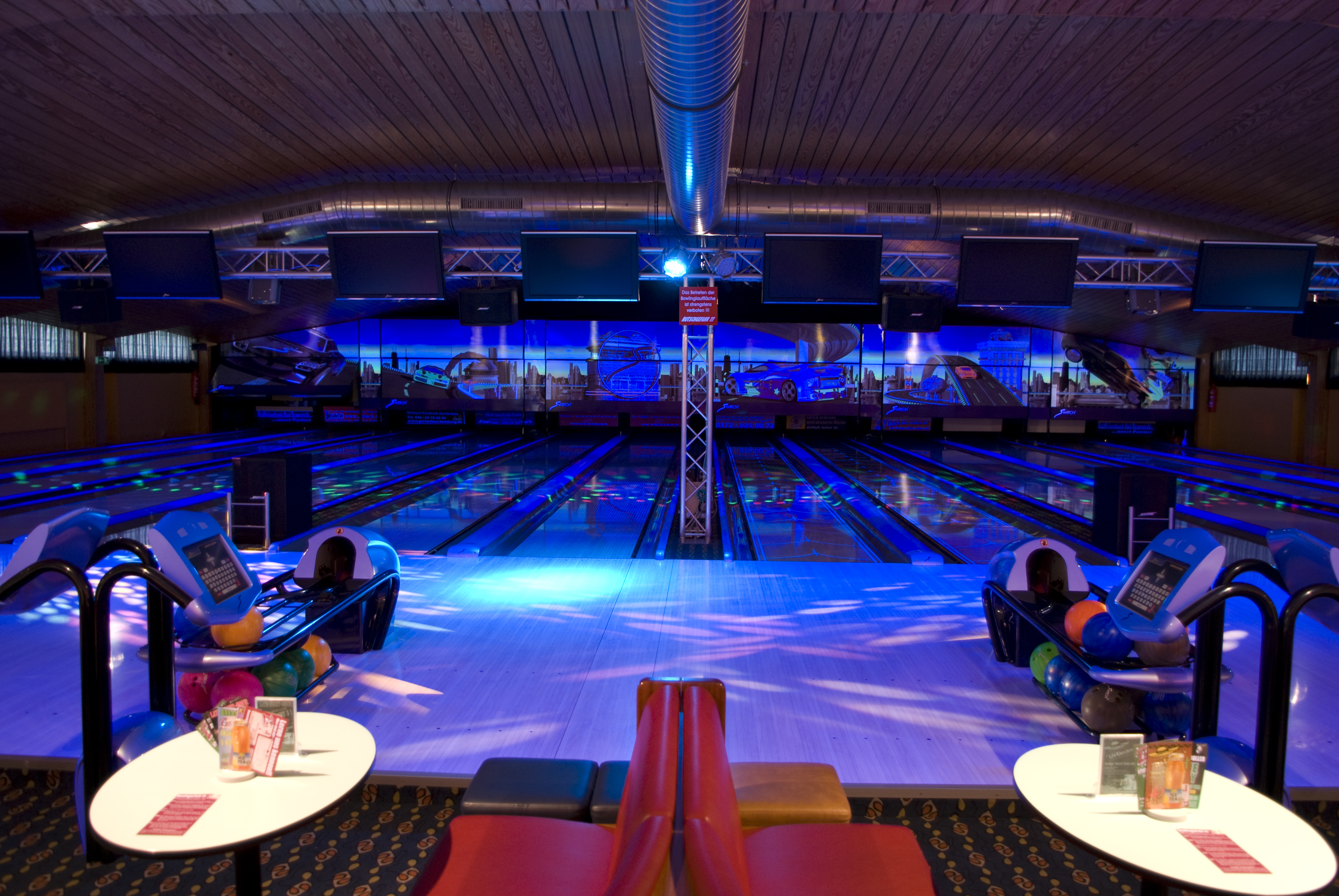
To attract a broader range of patrons, many bowling centers offer "cosmic bowling" (shown) and host other special events.

Estimates of the number of total (league and non-league) bowlers in the U.S. have varied, from 82 million (1997, International Bowling Museum) to 51.6 million (2007, research firm White Hutchinson) to 71 million (2009, USBC), the USBC stating in 2019 that bowling is still the #1 participation sport in the U.S. More broadly, the International Bowling Museum stated in 2016 that bowling is played by 95 million people in more than 90 countries. In an era of continual decline in league participation, bowling centers promoted "party bowling" and black-light-and-disco-ball "cosmic bowling" and experienced a shift from blue-collar participants to open-play (non-league) family-oriented clientele in combined bowling and entertainment centers. Some offered laser tag, indoor playgrounds, go-karting, climbing walls, arcade games, skating rinks, gourmet restaurants, and nightclub-style bowling lounges. School sport programs expanded, the USBC stating that more than 5,000 high schools offered bowling as a competitive sport, with 50,000 student bowlers participating in 2009–2010. In 2011, the Bowling Proprietor's Association of America stated that more than 60% of U.S. bowlers were under age 34, that 46% were girls and women, and that children participated in bowling at a higher rate than any other population group.

Since 1997, Bowlero Corporation (later called Lucky Strike Entertainment Corporation) acquired competitors AMF Bowling, Brunswick and Lucky Strike Lanes, and purchased the Professional Bowlers Association (PBA). In the early 2020s, U.S. bowlers experienced a surge in fees attributed by experts to consolidation of big chains, facilities upgrades, and effects of the COVID-19 pandemic when bowling alleys were deemed "non-essential businesses".

In contrast to the U.S., the 2000s and 2010s brought a bowling renaissance in the U.K., achieved by accommodating sophisticated modern tastes by providing (for example) retro-style bowling alleys outfitted with 1950s Americana, "boutique bowling", "VIP lanes", and cameras for instant replays, and by rejuvenating bowling "alleys" into diverse-entertainment bowling "centres". The population of ten-pin bowling centres grew from a low of barely 50 (in the 1980s) to over 200 (2006), with almost a third of Britons going bowling in 2016 and league participation growing over 20% over two years (2015–2017).

Though ten-pin bowling was a demonstration sport in the 1988 Summer Olympics (Seoul) and has been included in the Pan American Games since 1991, after making the shortlist for inclusion in the 2020 Summer Olympics (Tokyo), it was cut. One commentator noted that the sport's limited geographic popularity (the U.S., Australia and a few European and South American countries), and aging demographic of those who follow the sport, make it difficult to convince an Olympic Committee that wants to appeal to youth.

== Bowling organizations ==
In bowling, we are trying to deliver a heavy 14 or 15 pound bowling ball over the foul line at about an average speed of 16 or 17 miles per hour, apply a rotational force to the ball in order to gain an effective hook motion, hit a one inch sighting target on the lane, and accurately impact the pocket 60 feet away while smashing down about 36 pounds of lumber. There are certainly easier things to do.

— Rich Carrubba, 2013

=== International ===
World Bowling (WB) was formed in 2014 from component organizations of the Fédération Internationale des Quilleurs (FIQ, International Federation of Bowlers), which in 1952 developed from the International Bowling Association (IBA) which began operations in 1926. Since 1979 the International Olympic Committee has recognized the FIQ, and later, WB, as the sport's world governing body. WB establishes rules for the uniform practice of bowling throughout the world, and promotes bowling as an Olympic sport. The World Tenpin Bowling Association "membership discipline" (component organization) of WB serves the amateur sport of ten-pin bowling worldwide, adopting uniform playing rules and equipment specifications.

=== United Kingdom ===
The British Tenpin Bowling Association (BTBA, formed in 1961) is the official governing body recognized by World Bowling as the official sanctioning body in England, and as such "is responsible for the protection, integrity and development of the sport". Its stated vision is "to ensure that all people, irrespective of their age, disability, ethnic origin, marital status, sexual orientation or social status have a genuine and equal opportunity to participate in the sport at all levels and in all roles".

The National Association of Youth Bowling Clubs (NAYBC) is a BTBA subcommittee serving youth bowlers and youth bowling clubs.

The British Universities Tenpin Bowling Association (BUTBA, formed in 2008) organizes bowling events for present and former university and college students.

The Tenpin Bowling Proprietors Association (TBPA, formed in 1961 as an umbrella organization) is a trade association for the British ten-pin bowling industry.

=== United States ===
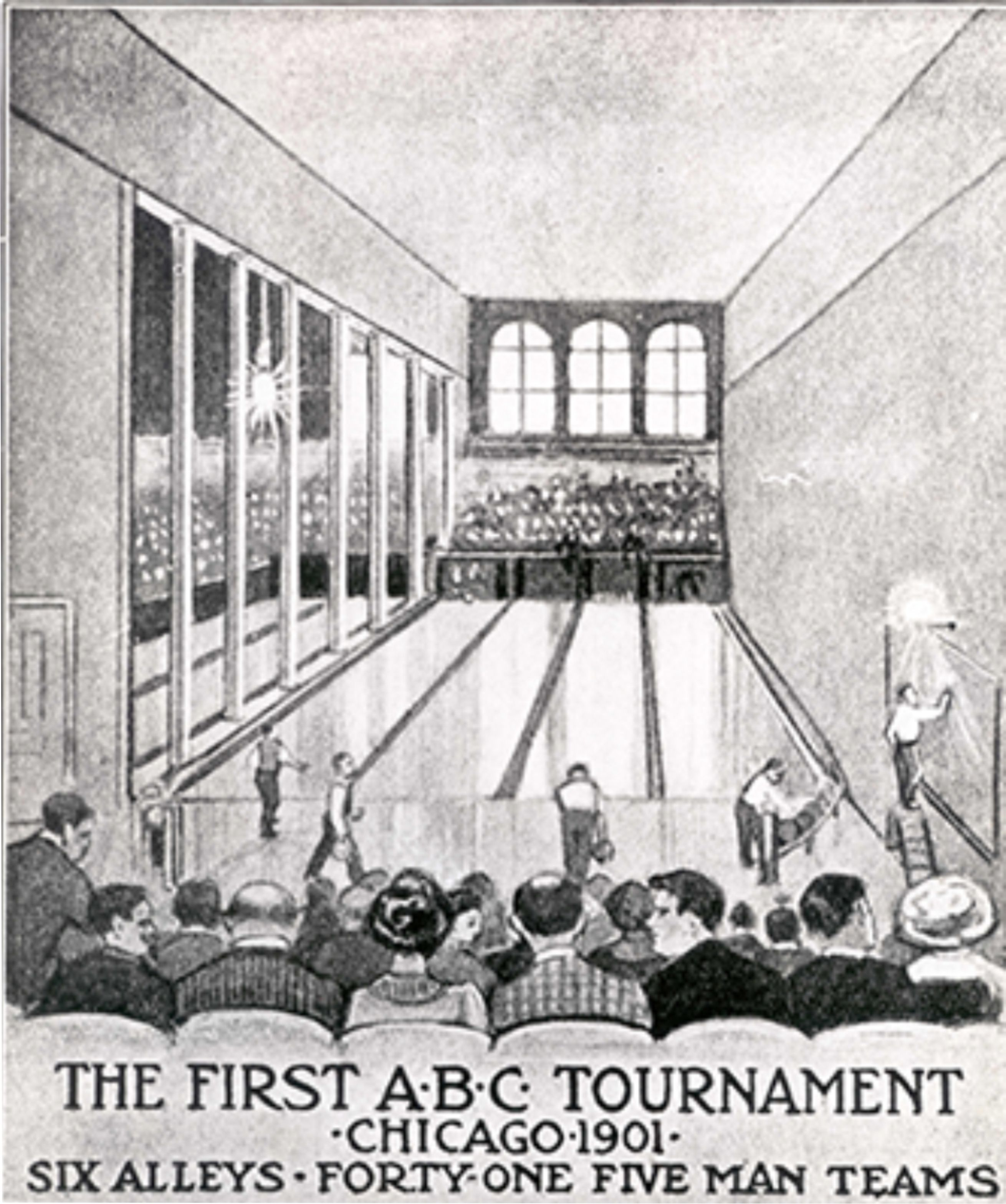
Poster for the first national bowling competition sanctioned by the American Bowling Congress. Highest per-game average scores: individual competition (216), doubles (200), five-man teams (181). A protest was filed against the highest-scoring doubles team, alleging use of a ball that was a quarter-inch larger in circumference than permitted.

The United States Bowling Congress (USBC) was formed as the governing body for the U.S. on January 1, 2005, by the merger of:

- the American Bowling Congress (ABC, an originally male-only organization founded in 1895),
- the Women's International Bowling Congress (WIBC, 1916),
- the Young American Bowling Alliance (YABA, 1982), which itself was formed from combining the American Junior Bowling Congress (AJBC, 1946), Youth Bowling Association (YBA, 1963–64), and ABC/WIBC Collegiate division (mid-1970s), and
- (Team) USA Bowling (1989).

As the national governing body for bowling, its stated mission is to provide services, resources and the standards for the sport, its stated goals including growing the sport and promoting values of "credibility, dedication, excellence, heritage, inclusiveness, integrity, philanthropy and sportsmanship".

The National Bowling Association (TNBA), formed in 1939 as the National Negro Bowling Association, served minority bowlers before the ABC and WIBC in 1950 removed restrictions limiting membership to Caucasians. Today's TNBA membership remains open to men and women without regard to race, creed or color.

=== Museums ===
The International Bowling Museum and Hall of Fame is located on the International Bowling Campus in Arlington, Texas, U.S.

== Tournaments ==
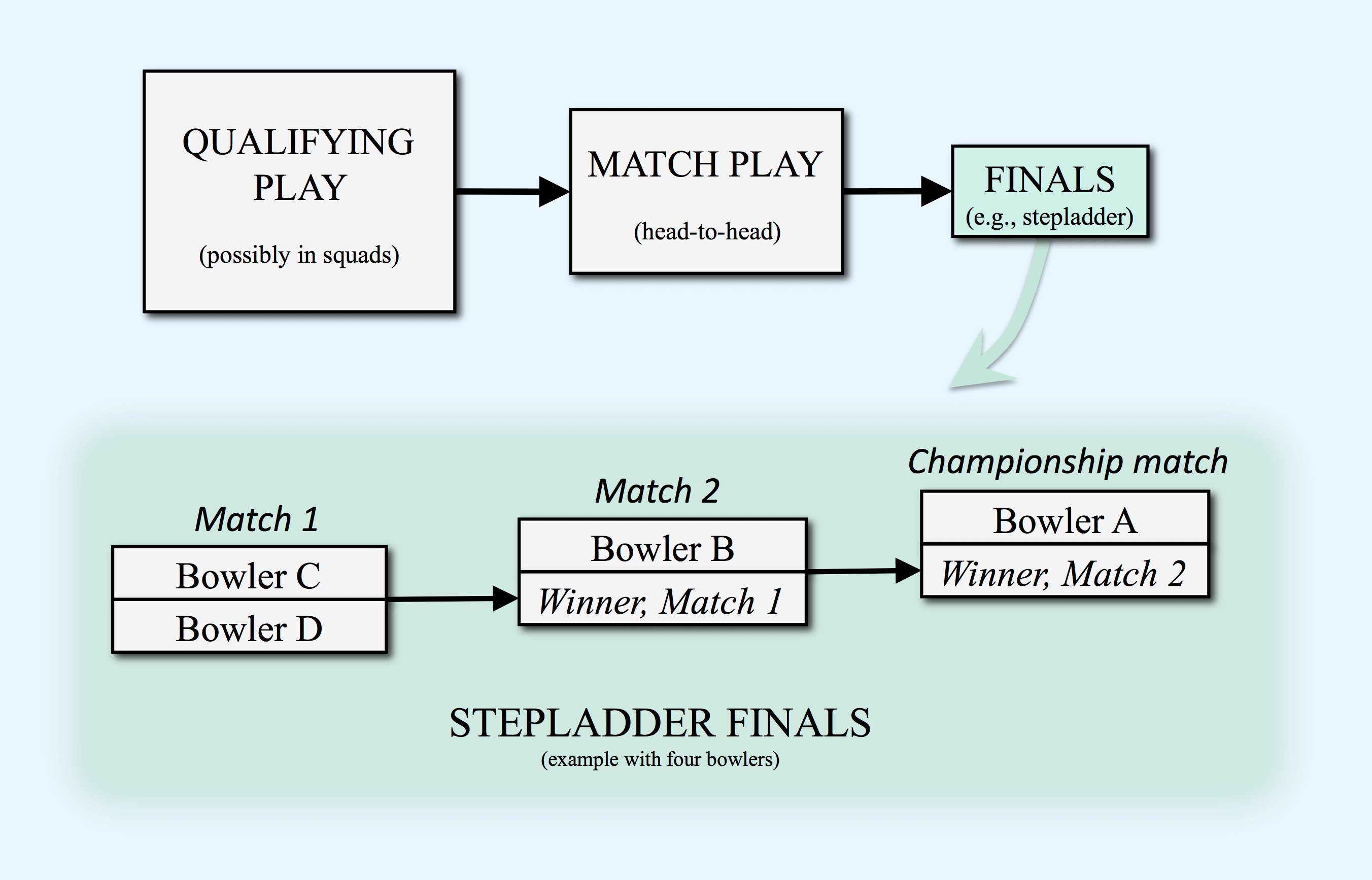
Conceptual diagram of a large bowling tournament. Entrants not eliminated in qualifying rounds go on to compete in match play, which determines seeding (initial ranking) for the final matches.

World Bowling oversees quadrennial World Championship tournaments, and international championships for various sectors, including for women, seniors, youth and junior bowlers.

The QubicaAMF Bowling World Cup (begun in 1965) is recognized as bowling's largest event in terms of number of countries competing, according to the USBC in 2018.

The Professional Bowlers Association (PBA) Tour has held anywhere from 15 to 25 events annually in recent years, mainly at U.S. locations. The PBA Tour includes "major" championship events: the U.S. Open, the USBC Masters, the PBA Tournament of Champions, the PBA World Championship, and the PBA Players Championship. Dozens more PBA tournaments are held in various U.S. geographical segments as part of the PBA Regional Tour.

The United States Bowling Congress (USBC) has various tournaments for the PBA tour, PWBA, youth and seniors, including the USBC Masters and U.S. Open (both major tournaments on the PBA tour), and USBC Queens and U.S. Women's Open (both major tournaments on the PWBA tour), plus the USBC Team USA Trials/U.S. National Amateur Bowling Championships. Additionally, the USBC has regional tournaments and certifies local tournaments.

The European Tenpin Bowling Federation (ETBF) owns the European Bowling Tour (organized in 2000), including its final tournament, the European Bowling Tour Masters (first edition: 2008).

The Commonwealth Tenpin Bowling Federation (CTBF), made up of World Bowling member federations within the Commonwealth of Nations, owns the Commonwealth Tenpin Bowling Championships, which has held tournaments at irregular intervals since 2002.

The Weber Cup is an annual, three-day US vs. Europe tournament, named after Dick Weber, that began in 2000 and has been held almost exclusively in the U.K.

In the decade of the 2000s, the World Ranking Masters, owned by World Bowling, ranked standings in the Pan American Bowling Confederation (PABCON), Asian Bowling Federation (ABF), and European Tenpin Bowling Federation (ETBF).

Though ten-pin bowling has not progressed beyond a demonstration sport at the Olympic Games, international games modeled after the Olympics (awarding medals) do include the sport, including the World Games (governed by the International World Games Association), the Asian Games (governed by the Olympic Council of Asia, OCA) and the Pan American Games (governed by the Pan American Sports Organization, PASO). The Maccabiah Games (governed by the Israeli Bowling Federation, IBF, with events played according to WTBA-ETBF rules) host ten-pin tournaments as medal events.

== Leagues ==
USBC membership has declined, indicating waning league participation in the U.S. At the sport's peak, there were 7 million league bowlers and 11,500 bowling centers.

Same data, normalized to 1997 values to show relative change in lanes, centers and membership

The average number of lanes per bowling center has trended upward slightly during this time period.

In about 2015, U.S. bowling center employment reversed a long decline, which some attribute to their diversification into more broad-based entertainment centers.

Bowling leagues vary in format, including demographic specialization (male, female, mixed, senior, youth), number of bowlers per team (usually 3–5), number of games per series (usually 3), day and time of scheduled sessions, starting dates and duration of league seasons, scoring (scratch versus handicap), and systems for bestowing awards and prizes. Usually, each team is scheduled to oppose each of the other teams over the course of a season. Position rounds—in which the first place team opposes the second place team, third place opposes fourth place, and so on—are often inserted into the season schedule.

Customarily, team position standings are computed after each series, awarding a first number of points for each game won and a second number of points for achieving the higher team score for that series, the particular numbers being specified in each league's rules. Further, in leagues having "match point" scoring, individual bowlers on one team are matched against respective members of the opposing team, the winners receiving points that supplement their team's game and series points.

The number of league bowlers in the U.S. peaked at 8 million in 1980, declining to approximately 1 million by the early 2020s.

== Notable professional achievements ==
=== Titles and scores ===
- First perfect game on live national television: Jack Biondolillo (1967, Firestone Tournament of Champions)
- First female to bowl a perfect game on national television: Ritsuko Nakayama (1970, Japan)
- Most titles in a single PBA Tour season: Mark Roth (8 titles in 1978)
- Most titles in a single PWBA Tour season: Carolyn Dorin-Ballard (7 titles in 2001)
- First woman to win a PBA Tour event: Kelly Kulick (2010, PBA Tournament of Champions)
- Most PBA Tour titles (career): Walter Ray Williams Jr. (47 titles, reached in 2010)
- Most PWBA Tour titles (career): Lisa Wagner (32 titles, reached in 1999)
- First to earn 100 combined titles in PBA Tour, PBA50 Tour and regional competition: Walter Ray Williams Jr. (2016)
- Most PBA Tour major titles (career): Jason Belmonte (15, reached in 2023)
- Most PWBA Tour major titles (career): Liz Johnson (10, reached in 2017)
- Only winners of a career "Super Slam" (all five PBA majors): Mike Aulby (1996) and Jason Belmonte (2020)

=== Earnings and contracts ===
- First (in any sport) to receive $1,000,000 endorsement contract: Don Carter (1964, with Ebonite International)
- First to earn more than US$100,000 in a single season: Earl Anthony (1975)
- First female to earn more than US$100,000 in a single season: Lisa Wagner (1988)
- First to earn US$1 million in career earnings: Earl Anthony (1982)
- First female to earn US$1 million in career earnings: Aleta Sill (1996)
- First to earn US$2 million in career earnings: Walter Ray Williams Jr. (1997).
- Most earnings in a single PBA season: Kyle Troup ($496,900 in 2021)
- First to earn US$3 million in career earnings: Walter Ray Williams Jr. (2002–03)
- Highest first-place prize awarded in a single professional bowling tournament: $250,000 in the 2011 PBA Tournament of Champions (won by Mika Koivuniemi) and 2021 PBA Players Championship (won by Kyle Troup)

=== Youngest ===
- Youngest to win a standard PBA Tour title: Norm Duke (1983, at age 18 years, 345 days)
- Youngest to earn cash in a PBA Tour event: Kamron Doyle (age 14, 2012 U.S. Open)
- Youngest to win a PBA Tour major tournament: Anthony Simonsen (2016 USBC Masters at age 19 years, 39 days)
- Youngest to win a standard PWBA Tour event: Jillian Martin (2021 PWBA BowlTV Classic at age 17 years, 16 days)
- Youngest to win a PWBA Tour major event: Wendy Macpherson (1986 U.S. Women's Open at age 18 years, 69 days)

=== Oldest ===
- Oldest to win a standard PBA Tour title: John Handegard (1995, at age 57 years, 139 days)
- Oldest to win a PBA Tour major tournament (that was classified as a major when it took place): Pete Weber (2013 Barbasol Tournament of Champions at age 50 years, 222 days) (NOTE: Ernie Schlegel won the 1996 USBC Masters at age 53 before it was considered a PBA event; he was retroactively credited with a major due to a 2008 rule change. Parker Bohn III was retroactively credited with a major win in 2016 after winning the 2015 PBA Players Championship at age 51.)

== Perfect (300) game history ==
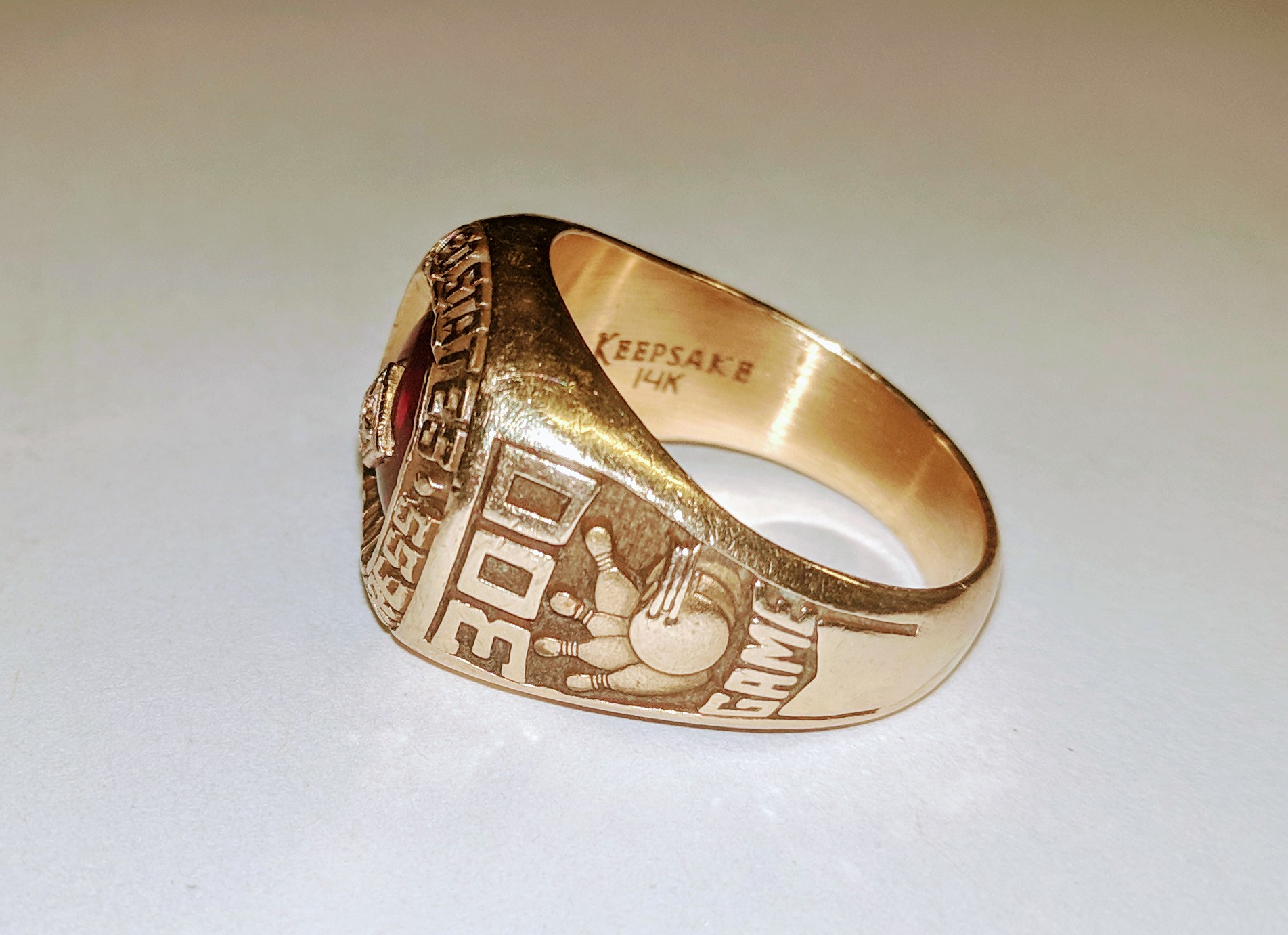
A USBC "300 game" gold ring

Ernest Fosberg (East Rockford, Illinois) bowled the first recognized 300 in 1902, before awards were given out. In 1908, A.C. Jellison and Homer Sanders (both of St. Louis) each bowled 300 games in the same season, the ABC awarding the gold medal for the highest score of the year to Jellison after a three-game tie-breaker match, without regard to the chronological order of their accomplishments.

On January 7, 2006, Elliot John Crosby became the youngest British bowler to bowl a BTBA-sanctioned 300 game at the age of 12 years, 2 months and 10 days, breaking the 1994 record of Rhys Parfitt (age 13 years, 4 months).

On November 17, 2013, Hannah Diem (Seminole, Florida) became the youngest American bowler to bowl a USBC-certified 300 game at the age of 9 years, 6 months and 19 days, breaking the 2006 record of Chaz Dennis (age 10) and the 2006 female record of Brandie Reamy (age 12).

Jeremy Sonnenfeld (Sioux Falls, South Dakota) rolled the first certified 900 series in 1997. A well-publicized court-contested 900 series by Glenn Allison in 1982, considered by many to be the first-ever 900 series, was denied certification due to non-conforming lane conditions.

== "Score inflation" controversy ==
The number of sanctioned perfect (300) games per league bowler has increased substantially since the 1990s. Freeman and Hatfield posit that the increase in perfect games is due to factors such as the introduction of reactive resin coverstocks, asymmetric ball cores, synthetic lane surfaces, and precision lane oiling machines.

The 905 perfect games that were rolled during the 1968–69 season increased 38-fold to 34,470 in the 1998–99 season. Likewise, the number of perfect-game league bowlers increased from about one of 3150 (1900–1980) to about one of 27 (2007), a greater-than-hundredfold increase that many thought threatened to jeopardize the integrity of the sport. Though median averages for male league bowlers remained at about 168 from the 1980s through the mid-2010s, the number of top average scores over 190 soared, suggesting that more skilled bowlers are making use of technological advancements. The USBC Technical Director wrote that the "USBC is concerned that technology has overtaken player skill in determining success in the sport of bowling," announcing in 2007 the completion of a ball motion study undertaken "to strike a better balance between player skill and technology".

Automatic lane oiling machines can be programmed to lay down oil patterns of different levels of difficulty. "Typical house shots" enable higher scores than the more challenging "sport shots".

Separately, a USBC pin carry study completed in about 2008 found that dramatically increased entry angles improve pin carry to result in higher scores—regardless of whether the bowlers supplied additional effort or improved their skill. Among the factors allowing higher scores were technological advances in coverstock and core design combined with improved lane surfaces and accommodative oil patterns.

Specifically, the reactive resin balls and particle balls that came out in the 1990s increased frictional engagement with the lane to provide greater hook potential that made high entry angles easier to achieve. Moreover, changes in lane surface technology, as well as the introduction of voids into pins to make them lighter and more top-heavy, helped to raise average scores as early as the 1970s. Expanded choices in oil viscosity and electronically controlled lane oiling machines permitted alley owners to customize house oil patterns to optimize the advantages of the new ball technologies. Technological progress allowed some 1990s league scores to surpass those of professionals in the 1950s.

Responding to such concerns, the USBC initiated "sport bowling" leagues and tournaments that provide "sport", "challenge" and "PBA Experience" oil patterns that are more challenging than the accommodative patterns of typical house shots. Still, the USBC has encountered enduring issues concerning how to maintain "average integrity" (fair handicapping) across leagues using oil patterns of differing difficulty.

As a result of various USBC studies, including a bowling technology study published in February 2018, the USBC Equipment and Specifications Committee established new specifications focusing mainly on balls. The overall result of the new specifications was said to slightly limit hook potential, more specifically eliminating balance holes (as of the 2020–21 season) and setting a new specification for oil absorption. The USBC stated that the new specifications will slow oil pattern transition, cause bowlers to move less, and keep the same scoring pace with lower oil volume.

== In media ==
=== Coverage of events ===
Beginning in 1962, ABC's Pro Bowlers Tour was broadcast on Saturday afternoons to be viewed by millions, and—with various entertainment-oriented programs including Make That Spare, Celebrity Bowling and Bowling for Dollars—confirmed the sport's popularity. The Pro Bowlers Tour garnered excellent ratings in the 1960s and early 1970s, as a lead-in to ABC's Wide World of Sports. However, television ratings fell substantially, from 9.1 in the mid-1970s to 2.0 in 1997, the year in which Pro Bowlers Tour was canceled.

The decline in bowling event coverage has been attributed to a variety of factors, including time demands burdening the schedules of two-income households, small purses (winnings) for professional tournaments, declining participation in league bowling, the perceived demographic of bowlers (old, or of low social class), waning popularity with the public, competing sports programming on cable television, lack of corporate sponsorship, lack of an inspiring bowling star (2004), and an aging audience for TV bowling. A 2006 PBA article describing the PBA bowlers in the documentary A League of Ordinary Gentlemen called bowling athletes "the Rodney Dangerfields of professional sports".

The decline in coverage has also been attributed to the perception that bowling is less an athletic sport (not being in the Olympic Games) and more of a recreational pastime (such as for children's birthday parties). This perception is reinforced by the easy lane conditions provided to bowling leagues that enable seasoned league bowlers to achieve scores rivaling those of professionals who must bowl under more challenging lane conditions.

Former PBA Commissioner Mark Gerberich said that ABC paid the PBA $200,000 per broadcast in 1991, but by 1997 "we were paying $150,000 to stay on TV." Said to be "near bankruptcy" in 2000, the PBA changed ownership to one that emphasized marketing with the goal of running the organization as a for-profit business. ESPN featured bowling from 2000 to 2018 on Sunday afternoons, with CBS Sports Network also airing a smaller number of bowling tournaments.

In 2019, the PBA entered an agreement, expected to last four years, in which Fox Sports would sell advertising and sponsorships for the sport to establish the sport's presence on broadcast television, also providing cable, streaming, and social media programming. In September 2019, Bowlero Corporation purchased the PBA.

=== Portrayal on television ===
Particular television broadcasts include:

- 1950s: The Honeymooners (1952); Championship Bowling (1952).
- 1960s: Make That Spare; premiere episode of The Flintstones (1960-1966); Jackpot Bowling (1959-1961).
- 1970s: Celebrity Bowling (beginning in 1971); All In the Family; Bowling for Dollars (through 1980); Laverne and Shirley (1976 debut); ESPN broadcasts five of six fall PBA Tour events in its debut year (1979).
- 1980s: The New Celebrity Bowling (beginning in 1987); Married With Children; Grim Reaper AIDS awareness campaign (1987)
- 1990s: The Simpsons; The Drew Carey Show (annual contest); Nubeluz ("Los Palitroques Gigantes", one of the Peruvian show's signature games)
- 2000s: According to Jim; Let's Bowl! (on Comedy Central: bowling to settle court disputes); Malcolm in the Middle.
- 2020s: How We Roll (2022)

=== In print ===
- In J. K. Rowling's Harry Potter and the Philosopher's Stone, Professor Albus Dumbledore is a fan of ten-pin bowling.

=== Non-fiction films ===
- Strikes and Spares (1934) was nominated for an Academy Award for Best Novelty Short.
- Pin Gods (1996) presents the early challenges of three young bowlers breaking into professional bowling.
- The PBS Independent Lens documentary A League of Ordinary Gentlemen (2006) chronicles the stories of four PBA Tour bowlers at different stages of their careers, following the purchase of the PBA and appointment of former Nike executive Steve Miller as Director.

=== Fiction films ===
- In the animated short cartoon The Bowling Alley-Cat (1942), cat and mouse Tom and Jerry do battle inside a bowling center.
- In Dreamer (1979), Tim Matheson plays a man aspiring to be a professional bowler who faces a challenger played by Dick Weber.
- In Greedy (1994), Michael J. Fox plays an "honest but luckless pro bowler with a bad wrist and a good woman."
- The Farrelly brothers' comedy Kingpin (1996) is a bowling comedy about which Randy Quaid said in an interview, "If we can't laugh at bowling, what can we laugh at?"
- In the Coen Brothers' The Big Lebowski (1998), "the Dude" (Jeff Bridges), a "slacker's slacker", hangs out with his buddies at a bowling alley, in which John Goodman's character pulls out a gun to threaten a competitor who stepped over the foul line and refused to accept the mandatory zero score for the shot.
- In the Disney Channel's Alley Cats Strike (2000), high school students engage in a bowling rivalry.

=== Games ===
See also Bowling video games.

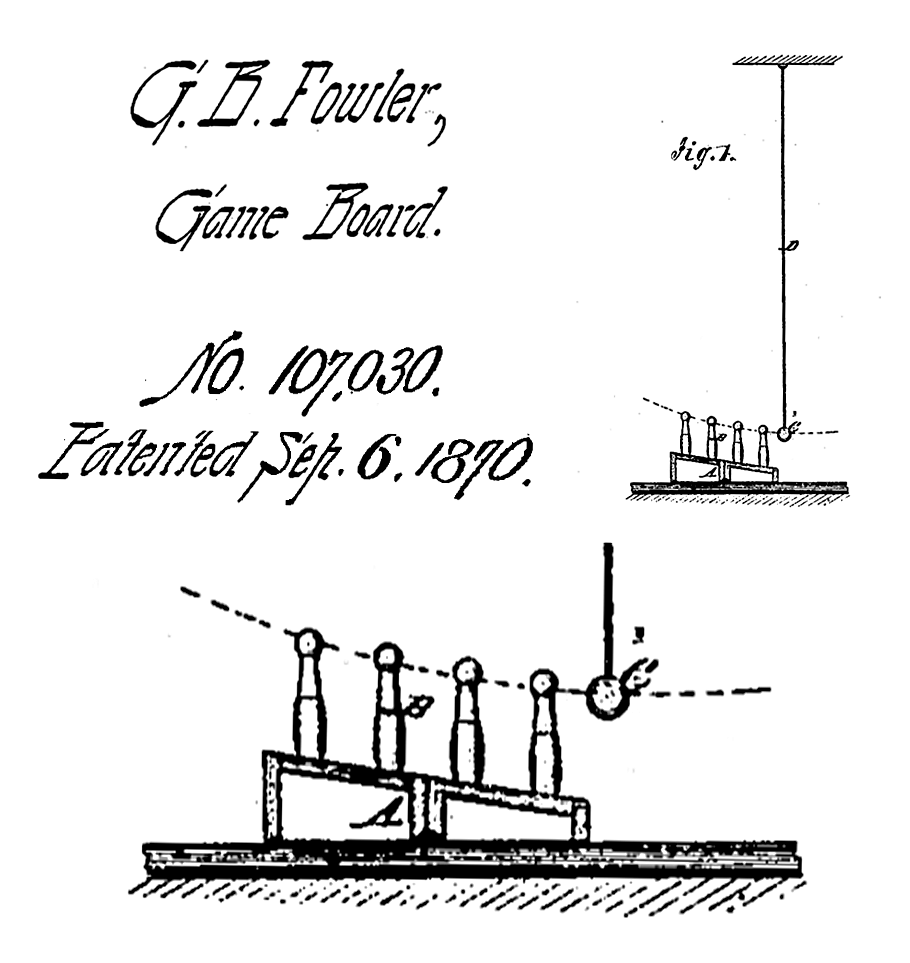
The inventor of this 1870 patent claims to have "invented a new and useful adaptation of the old and favorite Game of Ten-Pins ... rendered available for parlor or indoor use".

What is believed to be the first bowling video game was released in the 1977, a built-in provided with the RCA Studio II console. A pseudo-3D game was released in 1982 for the Emerson Arcadia 2001 console, and a multi-player game was released by SNK in 1991, almost a decade before convincing 3D graphics arrived. Wii Sports, which was released in 2006, includes a bowling game for the 3D-motion-controlled console, and mobile-device bowling games have since become increasingly popular. Several organizations—including the PBA and entertainment franchises such as Animaniacs, The Simpsons, Monsters, Inc., and The Flintstones—have granted licenses to use their names for video games.

== See also ==
- Glossary of bowling
- List of ten-pin bowlers
- List of world bowling champions
- Bowls

== Publications ==
- Benner, Donald; Mours, Nicole; Ridenour, Paul (2009). "Pin Carry Study: Bowl Expo 2009" (Slide show presentation). bowl.com. Archived (PDF) from the original on December 7, 2010. USBC, Equipment Specifications and Certifications Division.
- Freeman, James; Hatfield, Ron (July 15, 2018). Bowling Beyond the Basics: What's Really Happening on the Lanes, and What You Can Do about It. BowlSmart. ISBN 978-1 73 241000 8.
- Stremmel, Neil; Ridenour, Paul; Stervenz, Scott (2008). "Identifying the Critical Factors That Contribute to Bowling Ball Motion on a Bowling Lane" (PDF). United States Bowling Congress. Archived (PDF) from the original on June 3, 2012. Study began in 2005. Publication date is estimated based on article content.
- USBC Equipment Specifications and Certification Team (2008). "Ball Motion Study: Phase I and II Final Report" (PDF). Archived (PDF) from the original on March 27, 2023.
- United States Bowling Congress (USBC) (2025). "USBC Equipment Specifications and Certifications Manual" (PDF). bowl.com. Archived (PDF) from the original on December 20, 2025. (date is estimated)
- United States Bowling Congress (USBC) (February 2018). "Bowling Technology Study: An Examination and Discussion on Technology's Impact in the Sport of Bowling" (PDF). bowl.com. Archived (PDF) from the original on December 31, 2018.
- United States Bowling Congress (USBC) (2024). "Playing Rules 2025-2026" (PDF). bowl.com. Archived (PDF) from the original on December 20, 2025.
- Vogel, A. F. (December 1892). "Bowling" (PDF). Spalding's Athletic Library. Vol. 1, no. 3. New York: American Sports Publishing Company. Archived from the original (PDF) on March 27, 2020.
