= Wild Turkey =

A wild turkey is a heavy North American gamebird.

Wild Turkey may also refer to:

- Wild Turkey (bourbon), a brand of whiskey
- Wild Turkey (band), a 1970s rock band formed by former Jethro Tull bassist Glenn Cornick and Gentle Giant drummer John Weathers
- The act of rolling six consecutive strikes (bowling)
