= Hook (bowling) =

Curved path followed by a bowling ball

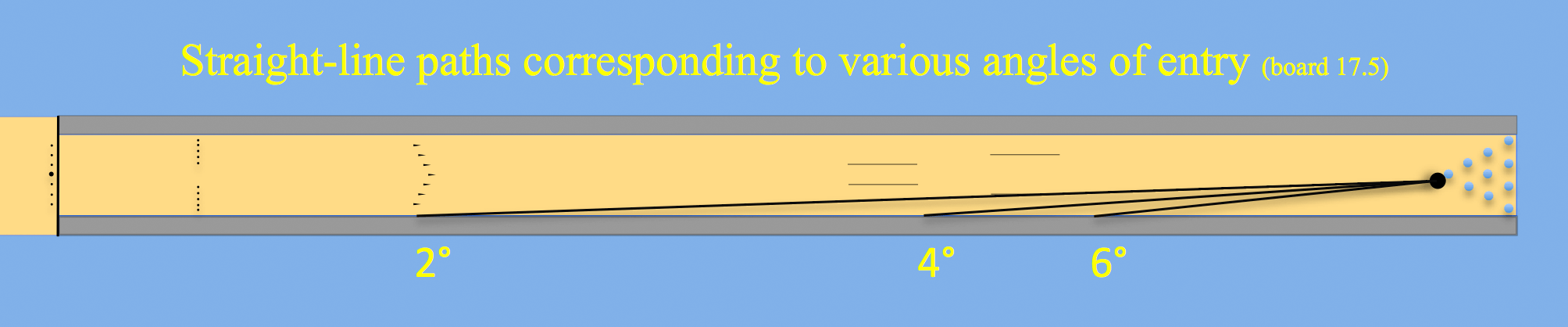
True scale diagram: A straight path, even one starting from the extreme outside corner of the lane, results in an angle of entry of at most 1.45°. Larger entry angles (shown in diagram) are achievable when hooking (curving) the ball. Larger entry angles have been shown to be generally more favorable for achieving strikes.

• Top: Simplified representation of the skid, hook, and roll phases of bowling ball motion. • Middle: Hook is enabled by side rotation as the ball frictionally engages dry lane surface as it nears the pins. • Bottom: Though the ball's translational speed down the lane (brown arrows) decreases, its rotational speed (yellow arrowheads) increases. Technological advances since the early 1990s in ball design have allowed dramatically increased hook potential and strike frequency, without requiring additional skill on the part of bowlers.

A hook in ten-pin bowling is a ball that rolls in a curving pattern (as opposed to straight). The purpose of the hook is to give the ball a better angle at the 1-3 pocket (right-handers) or 1-2 pocket (left-handers.) to achieve a strike. When a ball is rolled straight, hitting the pocket must be precise. By hooking the ball, the ball will hit the pins with more force, producing better carry - especially on the 5-pin during a strike ball. Straight roll - even when it hits the pocket, will tend to leave a tap such as the 5-pin on a light hit, or the 10-pin if the ball was just slightly right of center pocket or with inadequate entry angle. A hook ball can achieve strikes with less precise hits.

A hook ball can also help the bowler shape the shot on challenging oil patterns.

In duckpin bowling, candlepin bowling, and nine-pin bowling, hook potential is greatly reduced since the balls are generally rolled much faster and thus have less time for a hook to develop.

== Techniques ==
The texture of ball surfaces—measured in "grit" of abrasives used—affects ball path (skid distance and hook). Regardless of the ball's surface grit, the skid phase in the oil pattern occurs before the hook phase, which precedes the roll phase before reaching the pins.

Balls skid through the oil pattern but hook more after exiting the pattern. The so-called "Rule of 31"—actually an informal guideline—calculates the approximate board on which a ball should exit a particular oil pattern based on the length of the pattern, in order to achieve a strike.

There are two ways to produce a hook. The first method involves bowling technique. At the moment of throwing the bowling ball, the hand should be behind the ball and where the thumb (for a right-hander) is anywhere between 10-o'clock and 12-o'clock, and the two fingers are between 4-o'clock and 6-o'clock. Just before releasing the ball, the entire hand starts rotating in a counter-clockwise motion. The thumb must fall out of the ball first, then the middle and ring finger release almost simultaneously, again in a counter-clockwise direction (called "lift"). A lift release gives the roll more torque (and therefore more power), along with the spin needed for the hook. When the two fingers lift the ball correctly, it will cause the thumb to naturally fall out of the ball first, so one does not have to make a conscious effort to remove the thumb before the fingers.

There are innumerable variations in style and technique and the position of the thumb can vary from person to person. Some bowlers, including professionals, will actually roll the bowling ball with just the two fingers, allowing the hand to give the ball even more torque without having to worry about the thumb restricting the spin.

The second way to produce a hook is by modifying the bowling ball. Illegally, one can play with the weighting of the bowling ball, such as drilling the ball so that there is more side weight on the right side of the ball (for a right-hander,) which would cause the ball to pull from right to left, causing a hook. Bowling balls ship with the weighting specifications on the container. A bowling shop professional can drill a bowling ball by first knowing the type of roll the bowler wants, and then can pick out the bowling ball with the weighting specifications in mind that match the bowler's needs. For a beginning bowler, the professional will usually drill the ball with the label directly in the middle, and between the fingers and thumb holes, causing the weighting to be balanced on both sides, causing the ball to roll straight.

Under USBC regulations, one can drill up to five holes on the bowling ball. Most bowlers use three holes (thumb and two fingers,). In the past, one could drill additional holes on other parts of the bowling ball, to take additional weight off of a portion of the bowling ball, such as an axis hole that allows the bowling ball's hook to stabilize during its roll to the pins. Doctoring the bowling ball by adding additional holes was recommended for experienced bowlers enough to know where to place these holes, such as studying the track area of the ball and knowing where to place the axis hole. Starting August 1, 2020, there is elimination of balance holes. With the elimination of balance holes, bowlers may have up to five holes for gripping purposes and all gripping holes must be used on every delivery.

== Backup ball ==
A left-handed release with a backup ball (shown) causes a hook in the same direction as that of a right-handed release using conventional hook. (Shown: Eric Jones)

A backup ball or back-up ball produces the opposite result of a hook. When a ball is rolled by a right-hander, the ball will hook from left to right. The bowling ball can be drilled for a left-handed bowler. The exact same principles of hooking a ball are applied on a backup ball, except the hand rotates clockwise for a right-handed bowler and counterclockwise for a left-handed bowler.

Backup balls are rarely thrown intentionally by serious bowlers, as the hand motion is much more difficult to accomplish than a standard hook, with no benefit in most cases. However, certain spares, such as the 2-8-10 for a right-hander, are easier to accomplish with one (as the rules of bowling prevent a bowler from switching hands). Bowlers may also use a backup ball due to lane conditions and a very small number of bowlers throw a backup ball regularly.

== See also ==
- Bowling
- Bowling ball
- Glossary of bowling
- Ten-pin bowling
- Massé shot, an equivalent technique employed in billiards to impart spin on the cue ball and produce a curving pattern.

== Publications ==
- Benner, Donald; Mours, Nicole; Ridenour, Paul (2009). "Pin Carry Study: Bowl Expo 2009" (Slide show presentation). bowl.com. USBC, Equipment Specifications and Certifications Division. Archived (PDF) from the original on December 7, 2010.
- Freeman, James; Hatfield, Ron (July 15, 2018). Bowling Beyond the Basics: What's Really Happening on the Lanes, and What You Can Do about It. BowlSmart. ISBN 978-1 73 241000 8.
- Stremmel, Neil; Ridenour, Paul; Stervenz, Scott (2008). "Identifying the Critical Factors That Contribute to Bowling Ball Motion on a Bowling Lane" (PDF). United States Bowling Congress. Archived (PDF) from the original on June 3, 2012. Study began in 2005. Publication date is estimated based on article content.
