= Strike (bowling) =

Knocking down all pins on the first try

With a proper hook, the ball only contacts the 1, 3, 5 and 9 pins (sequentially tinted red) to achieve a strike. All the other pins are knocked down in a chain reaction called pin scatter. This is commonly known as a perfect strike, an essential technique to achieve consecutive strikes.

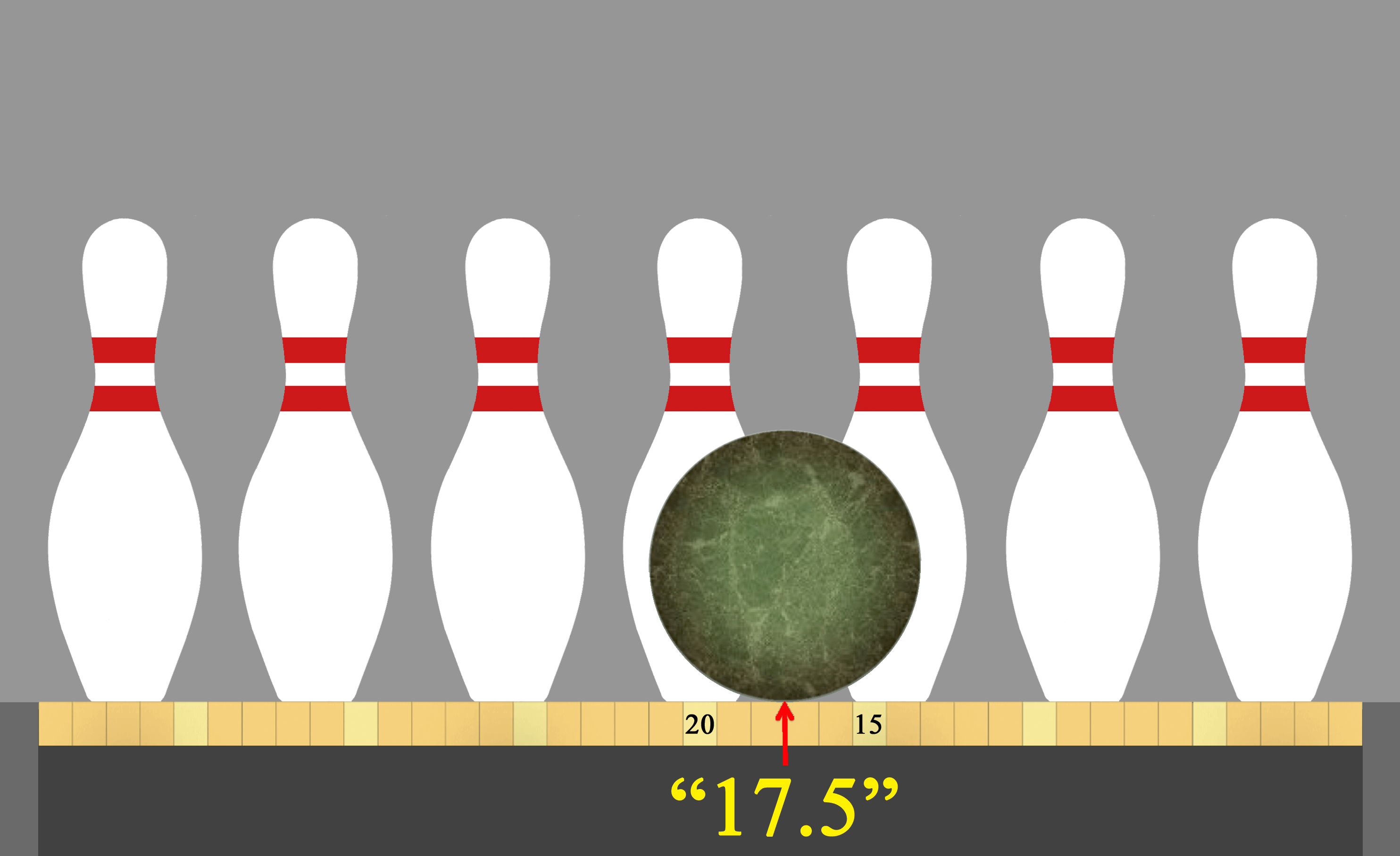
Front view: ball impacts center pocket at "board 17.5"—found by a USBC pin-carry study to maximize strike probability. The ideal impact point is closer to the center of the head pin than most people think.

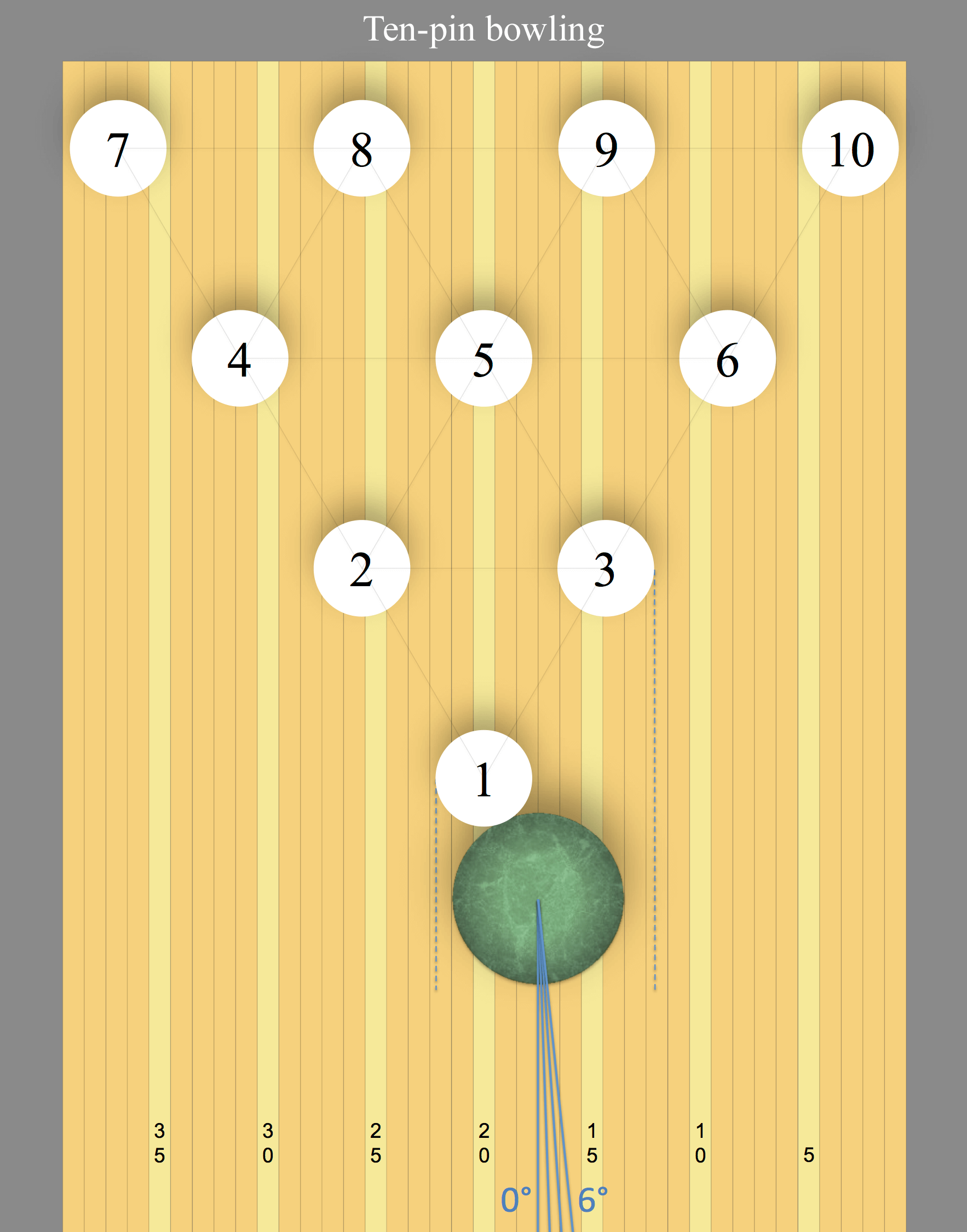
Top view: impacting the head pin at a point found to be optimum to strike.

A USBC pin carry study found "Board 17.5" to be the ideal ball location to achieve a strike, with higher entry angles (shown) and heavier balls (not graphed) generally providing greater chances of striking.

The so-called "Rule of 31"—actually an informal guideline—calculates the approximate board on which a ball should exit a particular oil pattern based on the length of the pattern, in order to achieve a strike.

In bowling, a strike means that all of the pins have been knocked down on the first ball roll of a frame. On a bowling scoresheet, a strike is marked by an "X".

In American nine-pin bowling, a ringer is an equivalent term for knocking down all pins on the first ball of the frame (known as a full house).

== Scoring ==
A ten-pin bowling score sheet showing how a strike is scored

The number of sanctioned perfect (300) games per league bowler has increased substantially since the 1990s. Freeman and Hatfield posit that the increase in perfect games is due to factors such as the introduction of reactive resin coverstocks, asymmetric ball cores, synthetic lane surfaces, and precision lane oiling machines.

Bowling scores are generally linearly proportional to strike frequency, with substantial variance based on whether the strikes are consecutive, and based on the number of open frames versus spares.

When all ten pins are knocked down with the first ball roll (called a strike and typically rendered as an "X" on a score sheet), a player is awarded ten points, plus a bonus of whatever is scored with the next two rolls (not necessarily the next two frames). In this way, the points scored for the two rolls after the strike are counted twice.

Frame 1, ball 1: 10 pins (strike)
Frame 2, ball 1: 3 pins
Frame 2, ball 2: 6 pins
The total score from these throws is:

- Frame one: 10 + (3 + 6) = 19
- Frame two: 3 + 6 = 9

TOTAL = 28

An easier non-standard method of scoring a strike is to score the strike with a flat 10 points and then add 1 to the multiplier of the next two rolls. Thus, the scoring of the above example would play out as below:

- Frame one: 10
- Frame two: (3 x 2) + (6 x 2) = 18

TOTAL = 28

Strike scoring works similarly for five-pin bowling, except strikes are worth 15 points rather than 10 (as the pins are scored with the values of 2, 3, 5, 3, and 2).

== Consecutive strikes ==
A series of two strikes is known as a "double" (or a "Barney Rubble" to rhyme), and a series of three is known as a "turkey" (sometimes a "sizzling turkey" on the first three frames). Any longer string of strikes is referred to by a number affixed to the word "bagger" or "pack", as in "four-bagger" or "six-pack". A string of four straight strikes is also known as a "hambone," a term invented by sports commentator Rob Stone. A string of five strikes in a row is a "brat", referring to bratwurst, but "nickel", has become far more common in recent years.

When a player is "on the strikes", a string is often referenced by affixing "in a row" to the number of consecutive strikes. A string of six strikes is sometimes called a "six pack" or a "sixer". A string of six and nine strikes are also known as a "wild turkey" and a "golden turkey" respectively. Any string of strikes starting in the first frame or ending "off the sheet" (where all of a bowler's shots from a certain frame to the end of the game strike) are often called the "front" or "back" strikes, respectively (e.g. the "front nine" for strikes in frames 1-9, or the "back six" for strikes in frames 7, 8, and 9 with a turkey in the tenth). Twelve strikes in a row is a perfect game; 36 straight strikes constitutes a 900 series. Due to the difficulty of achieving a game of 300 or a series of 900, many bowling alleys maintain 300 and 900 club plaques.

Multiple strikes would be scored like so:

Frame 1, ball 1: 10 pins (strike)
Frame 2, ball 1: 10 pins (strike)
Frame 3, ball 1: 4 pins
Frame 3, ball 2: 2 pins
The score from these throws is:

- Frame one: 10 + (10 + 4)= 24
- Frame two: 10 + (4 + 2) = 16
- Frame three: 4 + 2 = 6

TOTAL = 46

With the simpler non-standard system of scoring, the above example would be scored as below:

- Frame one: 10
- Frame two: 10 x 2 = 20
- Frame three: (4 x 3) + (2 x 2) = 16

TOTAL = 46

The most points that can be scored in one frame is 30 points (10 for the original strike, plus strikes in the two following frames)
The most points that can be scored in one game is 300 points which is a perfect game.

A player who bowls a strike in the tenth (final) frame is awarded two extra balls so as to allow the awarding of bonus points. If both these balls also result in ten pins knocked down each, a total of 30 points (10 + 10 + 10) is awarded for the frame. These bonus points only count as the bonus for the strike and not on their own.

== Publications ==
- Benner, Donald; Mours, Nicole; Ridenour, Paul (2009). "Pin Carry Study: Bowl Expo 2009" (Slide show presentation). bowl.com. USBC, Equipment Specifications and Certifications Division. Archived (PDF) from the original on December 7, 2010.
- Freeman, James; Hatfield, Ron (July 15, 2018). Bowling Beyond the Basics: What's Really Happening on the Lanes, and What You Can Do about It. BowlSmart. ISBN 978-1 73 241000 8.
