= Boxing at the 1978 Asian Games =

Boxing competitions

- Venue: Bangkok Recreation Center
- Dates: 10–18 December 1978
- Competitors: 94 from 17 nations

The Boxing Tournament at the 1978 Asian Games was held in Bangkok Recreation Center, Bangkok, Thailand from 10 to 18 December 1978.

South Korea finished first in medal table, winning five gold medals.

== Medalists ==
Event	Gold	Silver	Bronze
Light flyweight (48 kg)	Siri Supanya; Thailand	Ri Byong-uk; North Korea	Koki Suzuki; Japan
Light flyweight (48 kg)	Siri Supanya; Thailand	Ri Byong-uk; North Korea	Ali Bux; Pakistan
Flyweight (51 kg)	Koki Ishii; Japan	Johny Riberu; Indonesia	Wijaya Nimal Perera; Sri Lanka
Flyweight (51 kg)	Koki Ishii; Japan	Johny Riberu; Indonesia	Muhammad Sadiq; Pakistan
Bantamweight (54 kg)	Hwang Chul-soon; South Korea	Nyo Win; Burma	Sumanasiri Caldera; Sri Lanka
Bantamweight (54 kg)	Hwang Chul-soon; South Korea	Nyo Win; Burma	Pradit Srisathit; Thailand
Featherweight (57 kg)	Ku Yong-jo; North Korea	Khan Muhammad; Pakistan	Jung Taek-dong; South Korea
Featherweight (57 kg)	Ku Yong-jo; North Korea	Khan Muhammad; Pakistan	Ravsalyn Otgonbayar; Mongolia
Lightweight (60 kg)	Choi Chung-il; South Korea	Ruben Mares; Philippines	Yukio Odagiri; Japan
Lightweight (60 kg)	Choi Chung-il; South Korea	Ruben Mares; Philippines	Haram Khan; Burma
Light welterweight (63.5 kg)	Kim In-chang; South Korea	Vichit Praianan; Thailand	Khastyn Jamgan; Mongolia
Light welterweight (63.5 kg)	Kim In-chang; South Korea	Vichit Praianan; Thailand	C. C. Machaiah; India
Welterweight (67 kg)	Hwang Choong-jai; South Korea	Wallop Totassa; Thailand	Yusoff Hashim; Malaysia
Welterweight (67 kg)	Hwang Choong-jai; South Korea	Wallop Totassa; Thailand	Intisar Jabbar; Iraq
Light middleweight (71 kg)	Park Il-chun; South Korea	Rabieb Sangnual; Thailand	Muluk Singh; India
Light middleweight (71 kg)	Park Il-chun; South Korea	Rabieb Sangnual; Thailand	Muhammad Saeed; Pakistan
Middleweight (75 kg)	Wiem Gommies; Indonesia	Jang Bong-mun; North Korea	D. Erdenee; Mongolia
Middleweight (75 kg)	Wiem Gommies; Indonesia	Jang Bong-mun; North Korea	Park Young-kyu; South Korea
Light heavyweight (81 kg)	Iqbal Muhammad; Pakistan	Kim Nam-hee; South Korea	Sangob Wichensan; Thailand
Light heavyweight (81 kg)	Iqbal Muhammad; Pakistan	Kim Nam-hee; South Korea	Benny Maniani; Indonesia
Heavyweight (+81 kg)	Imtiaz Mahmood; Pakistan	Brij Mohan Sharma; India	Krismanto; Indonesia
Heavyweight (+81 kg)	Imtiaz Mahmood; Pakistan	Brij Mohan Sharma; India	Kim Ki-choon; South Korea

== Medal table ==
Rank	Nation	Gold	Silver	Bronze	Total
1	South Korea (KOR)	5	1	3	9
2	Pakistan (PAK)	2	1	3	6
3	Thailand (THA)	1	3	2	6
4	North Korea (PRK)	1	2	0	3
5	Indonesia (INA)	1	1	2	4
6	Japan (JPN)	1	0	2	3
7	India (IND)	0	1	2	3
8	Burma (BIR)	0	1	1	2
9	Philippines (PHI)	0	1	0	1
10	Mongolia (MGL)	0	0	3	3
11	Sri Lanka (SRI)	0	0	2	2
12	Iraq (IRQ)	0	0	1	1
12	Malaysia (MAL)	0	0	1	1
Totals (13 entries)		11	11	22	44

== Participating nations ==
A total of 94 athletes from 17 nations competed in boxing at the 1978 Asian Games:

- Burma (3)
- Hong Kong (5)
- India (8)
- Indonesia (7)
- Iraq (2)
- Japan (7)
- Malaysia (3)
- Mongolia (5)
- Nepal (2)
- North Korea (7)
- Pakistan (11)
- Philippines (6)
- Singapore (1)
- South Korea (11)
- Sri Lanka (4)
- Syria (2)
- Thailand (10)
