= Wrestling at the 1978 Asian Games =

- Dates: 11–14 December 1978

Wrestling was one of the sports which was held at the 1978 Asian Games in Bangkok, Thailand between 11 and 14 December 1978. The competition included only men's freestyle events.

== Medalists ==
Event	Gold	Silver	Bronze
48 kg	Takashi Irie; Japan	Jang Se-hong; North Korea	Kim Hwa-kyung; South Korea
52 kg	Yuji Takada; Japan	Kim Jong-kyu; South Korea	Dorjzovdyn Ganbat; Mongolia
57 kg	Hideaki Tomiyama; Japan	Muhammad Azeem; Pakistan	Kim Eui-kon; South Korea
62 kg	Yang Jung-mo; South Korea	Norio Yamazaki; Japan	Abdul Waheed; Pakistan
68 kg	Zevegiin Oidov; Mongolia	Akira Miyahara; Japan	Go Jin-won; South Korea
74 kg	Rajinder Singh; India	Katsuya Kawada; Japan	Jamtsyn Davaajav; Mongolia
82 kg	Masaru Motegi; Japan	Aduuchiin Baatarkhüü; Mongolia	Abdul-Rahman Breesam; Iraq
90 kg	Kartar Singh; India	Chimidiin Gochoosüren; Mongolia	Gao Jing; China
100 kg	Hiroshi Yamamoto; Japan	Jamtsyn Bor; Mongolia	Muhammad Salahuddin; Pakistan
+100 kg	Yoshiaki Yatsu; Japan	Satpal Singh; India	Javed Iqbal; Pakistan

== Medal table ==
Rank	Nation	Gold	Silver	Bronze	Total
1	Japan (JPN)	6	3	0	9
2	India (IND)	2	1	0	3
3	Mongolia (MGL)	1	3	2	6
4	South Korea (KOR)	1	1	3	5
5	Pakistan (PAK)	0	1	3	4
6	North Korea (PRK)	0	1	0	1
7	China (CHN)	0	0	1	1
7	Iraq (IRQ)	0	0	1	1
Totals (8 entries)		10	10	10	30
