= Sailing at the 1978 Asian Games =

- Venue: Pattaya Bay
- Dates: 12–16 December 1978

Sailing (as Yachting) was contested at the 1978 Asian Games in Pattaya Bay, Pattaya, Thailand in December 1978. There were four events in the competition.

Japan topped the medal table with two gold medals.

== Medalists ==
| Event | Gold | Silver | Bronze |
|---|---|---|---|
| OK | Naoki Nagatsu; Japan | Santi Thamasucharit; Thailand | Tan Swee Hung; Singapore |
| Super Moth | Damrong Sirisakorn; Thailand | Khin Thein; Burma | Masaaki Ogura; Japan |
| Enterprise | Pakistan; Byram D. Avari; Munir Sadiq | India; Surinder Mongia; Dharmendra Kumar | Thailand; Vinai Vongtim; Boonrawd Maneenoparat |
| Fireball | Japan; Shinichi Menjo; Shigeru Muto | Thailand; Chamnong Sampanyoo; Panasarn Hasdin | Singapore; Tan Kok Wah; Lewis Liem |

== Medal table ==
| Rank | Nation | Gold | Silver | Bronze | Total |
|---|---|---|---|---|---|
| 1 | Japan (JPN) | 2 | 0 | 1 | 3 |
| 2 | Thailand (THA) | 1 | 2 | 1 | 4 |
| 3 | Pakistan (PAK) | 1 | 0 | 0 | 1 |
| 4 | Burma (BIR) | 0 | 1 | 0 | 1 |
| 4 | India (IND) | 0 | 1 | 0 | 1 |
| 6 | Singapore (SIN) | 0 | 0 | 2 | 2 |
| Totals (6 entries) | | 4 | 4 | 4 | 12 |
