= Mongolia at the 1978 Asian Games =

- IOC code: MGL
- NOC: Mongolian National Olympic Committee

in Bangkok
- Medals Ranked 13th: Gold 1 Silver 3 Bronze 5 Total 9

Asian Games appearances (overview)
- 1974; 1978; 1982; 1986; 1990; 1994; 1998; 2002; 2006; 2010; 2014; 2018; 2022; 2026

Mongolia participated in the 1978 Asian Games held in from December 9, 1978 to December 20, 1978 in Bangkok, Thailand. It won 1 gold, 3 silver and 5 bronze medals.

== Medal summary ==
=== Medals by sport ===
Sport	Gold	Silver	Bronze	Total
Wrestling	1	3	2	6
Boxing			3	3
Total	1	3	5	9

=== Medalists ===
Medal	Name	Sport	Event
Gold	Zevegiin Oidov	Wrestling	Men's freestyle 68 kg
Silver	Aduuchiin Baatarkhüü	Wrestling	Men's freestyle 82 kg
Silver	Chimidiin Gochoosüren	Wrestling	Men's freestyle 90 kg
Silver	Jamtsyn Bor	Wrestling	Men's freestyle 100 kg
Bronze	Dorjzovdyn Ganbat	Wrestling	Men's freestyle 52 kg
Bronze	Jamtsyn Davaajav	Wrestling	Men's freestyle 74 kg
Bronze	Ravsalyn Otgonbayar	Boxing	Men's 57 kg
Bronze	Khastyn Jamgan	Boxing	Men's 63.5 kg
Bronze	D.Erdenee	Boxing	Men's 75 kg
