= Shooting at the 1978 Asian Games =

- Venue: Huamark Sport Complex
- Dates: 11–16 December 1978

Shooting sports at the 1978 Asian Games was held in Huamark Sports Complex Shooting Range, Bangkok, Thailand from 11 December 1978 to 16 December 1978.

Shooting comprised eleven individual and eleven team events, all open to both men and women. Each team could enter four shooters per event but only one score from each country counts in the individual competitions.

== Medalists ==
Event	Gold	Silver	Bronze
10 m air pistol	Fumihisa Semizuki; Japan	Ratana Krajangphot; Thailand	Zhang Hong; China
10 m air pistol team	Japan; Takayasu Eto; Makoto Ichimura; Masaaki Kamimura; Fumihisa Semizuki	Thailand; Vichit Chiewvej; Ratana Krajangphot; Boriboon Vutiphagdee; Rangsit Yanothai	China; Jin Chunba; Wang Jia; Zhang Hong; Zheng Qingshan
25 m center fire pistol	Hiroyuki Akatsuka; Japan	Su Xiaoan; China	Park Jong-kil; South Korea
25 m center fire pistol team	North Korea; Kim Chi-man; Kim Su-il; Nam Son-u; So Gil-san	South Korea; Cha Byeong-guk; Lim Tae-ho; Nam Ho-won; Park Jong-kil	China; Deng Zening; Liang Zhangyi; Su Xiaoan; Wang Xusheng
25 m rapid fire pistol	Park Jong-kil; South Korea	So Gil-san; North Korea	Takeo Kamachi; Japan
25 m rapid fire pistol team	North Korea; Kim Su-il; Nam Son-u; So Gil-san; Yun Chang-ho	Japan; Hiroyuki Akatsuka; Satoshi Fujita; Takeo Kamachi; Makoto Shiraishi	China; Chang Fuguang; Li Zhongqi; Liu Mingjun; Lu Zongjian
25 m standard pistol	Deng Zening; China	Park Jong-kil; South Korea	Hiroyuki Akatsuka; Japan
25 m standard pistol team	China; Deng Zening; Liang Zhangyi; Su Xiaoan; Wang Xusheng	Japan; Hiroyuki Akatsuka; Satoshi Fujita; Takeo Kamachi; Makoto Shiraishi	Thailand; Vit Chaikittikorn; Boriboon Vutiphagdee; Sirin Wangspa; Rangsit Yanothai
50 m pistol	Su Zhibo; China	Kim Gi-jong; North Korea	Masaaki Kamimura; Japan
50 m pistol team	China; Jin Chunba; Su Zhibo; Zhang Hong; Zheng Qingshan	Thailand; Samak Chainares; Vichit Chiewvej; Mongkol Promsit; Veera Uppapong	Japan; Takayasu Eto; Chikafumi Hirai; Makoto Ichimura; Masaaki Kamimura
10 m air rifle	Pang Liqin; China	Paisarn Chamornmarn; Thailand	Kim Gyong-ho; North Korea
10 m air rifle team	China; Mou Luhui; Pang Liqin; Qi Feng; Zhou Guining	North Korea; Kim Dong-gil; Kim Gyong-ho; Ri Ho-jun; Sin Jae-myung	South Korea; Myung Jae-hwan; Park Nam-soon; Seo Jang-woon; Yoon Deok-ha
50 m rifle prone	Kim Gyong-ho; North Korea	Lin Bo; China	Kwon Jeong-keon; South Korea
50 m rifle prone team	North Korea; Chei Yung-sam; Kim Gyong-ho; Kim Yun-sob; Pae Kyung-son	South Korea; Kwon Jeong-keon; Seo Jang-woon; Seo Man-ho; Yoon Deok-ha	China; Cheng Wensong; Jin Dongxiang; Lin Bo; Mou Luhui
50 m rifle 3 positions	Ri Ho-jun; North Korea	Mou Luhui; China	Yoon Deok-ha; South Korea
50 m rifle 3 positions team	China; Jin Dongxiang; Leng Guiying; Lin Bo; Mou Luhui	North Korea; Kim Dong-gil; Kim Gyong-ho; Kim Yun-sob; Ri Ho-jun	South Korea; Kwon Jeong-keon; Min Kyung-il; Seo Jang-woon; Yoon Deok-ha
50 m standard rifle 3 positions	Kim Dong-gil; North Korea	Leng Guiying; China	Ko Young-hee; South Korea
50 m standard rifle 3 positions team	China; Jin Dongxiang; Leng Guiying; Lin Bo; Mou Luhui	North Korea; Kim Dong-gil; Kim Gyong-ho; Kim Yun-sob; Ri Ho-jun	South Korea; Chang Kyung-il; Ko Young-hee; Seo Jang-woon; Yoon Deok-ha
Trap	Randhir Singh; India	Mitsuyoshi Kodaira; Japan	Noh Jeong-sik; South Korea
Trap team	Japan; Mitsuyoshi Kodaira; Kan Numajiri; Masao Obara; Kazumi Watanabe	South Korea; Choi Jeong-yong; Lee Moon-ho; Lee Suk-woo; Noh Jeong-sik	Thailand; Vichien Chaveewong; Pavitr Gajaseni; Damrong Pachonyut; Phairoj Rodjaroen
Skeet	Sakae Aoyagi; Japan	Lee Seung-kyun; South Korea	Guo Li; China
Skeet team	Japan; Sakae Aoyagi; Tsugio Hata; Hitoshi Hiraoka; Toshitsugu Takafuji	South Korea; Choi Hyun-joo; Kim Young-il; Kim Young-jin; Lee Seung-kyun	China; Guo Li; Jin Yaokang; Wu Lanying; Yue Ming

== Medal table ==
Rank	Nation	Gold	Silver	Bronze	Total
1	China (CHN)	8	4	7	19
2	North Korea (PRK)	6	5	1	12
3	Japan (JPN)	6	3	4	13
4	South Korea (KOR)	1	6	8	15
5	India (IND)	1	0	0	1
6	Thailand (THA)	0	4	2	6
Totals (6 entries)		22	22	22	66
