= Bowling at the 1978 Asian Games =

- Venue: Bangkok Bowl
- Dates: 12–16 December 1978

Ten-pin bowling took place for the men's and women's individual, doubles, trios, and team events at the 1978 Asian Games in Bangkok, Thailand.

== Medalists ==
=== Men ===
Event	Gold	Silver	Bronze
Singles	Masami Hirai; Japan	Lee Sung-jin; South Korea	Wong Chin Wah; Singapore
Doubles	Japan; Masami Hirai; Kiyoshi Taneda	Hong Kong; Abdoul Akber; Francis Kam	Thailand; Tave Vacharakasemsin; Pooh Nakeesatit
Trios	Thailand; Samran Banyen; Kasem Minalai; Montri Setvipisinee	Japan; Masami Hirai; Toshihiro Takahashi; Kiyoshi Taneda	Philippines; Tito Sotto; Manny Sugatan; Jose Santos
Team of 5	Malaysia; Alan Hooi; Khoo Boo Jin; Edward Lim; Holloway Cheah; P. S. Nathan; Lee Kok Hong	Thailand; Samran Banyen; Kasem Minalai; Tawal Srisarakam; Montri Setvipisinee; Pooh Nakeesatit; Tave Vacharakasemsin	South Korea; Lee Sung-jin; Byun Chul; Kim Bum-joon; Kim Jung-sam; Ahn Byung-ku
Masters	Ahn Byung-ku; South Korea	Masami Hirai; Japan	Samran Banyen; Thailand

=== Women ===
Event	Gold	Silver	Bronze
Singles	Bong Coo; Philippines	Rosario de Leon; Philippines	Catherine Che; Hong Kong
Doubles	Thailand; Tooh Daroonprasith; Anantita Hongsophon	Japan; Miyuki Motoi; Satomi Kiyofuji	Philippines; Lita dela Rosa; Nellie Castillo
Trios	Thailand; Porntip Singha; Orawan Nithinawakorn; Anantita Hongsophon	Philippines; Bong Coo; Lolita Reformado; Lita dela Rosa	Hong Kong; Vivien Lau; Maria Chong; Catherine Che
Team of 5	Philippines; Lita dela Rosa; Rosario de Leon; Lolita Reformado; Nellie Castillo; Bong Coo	Thailand; Benjaporn Thongsunsra; Porntip Singha; Orawan Nithinawakorn; Pranee Kitipongpithya; Anantita Hongsophon; Tooh Daroonprasith	South Korea; Chun Kyong-ok; Hong Bong-ok; Kim Byung-soon; Kim Chung-ja; Choi Jung-ja
Masters	Bong Coo; Philippines	Rosario de Leon; Philippines	Anantita Hongsophon; Thailand

== Medal table ==
Rank	Nation	Gold	Silver	Bronze	Total
1	Philippines (PHI)	3	3	2	8
2	Thailand (THA)	3	2	3	8
3	Japan (JPN)	2	3	0	5
4	South Korea (KOR)	1	1	2	4
5	Malaysia (MAL)	1	0	0	1
6	Hong Kong (HKG)	0	1	2	3
7	Singapore (SIN)	0	0	1	1
Totals (7 entries)		10	10	10	30
