= Arianne Cerdeña =

Filipino ten-pin bowling player

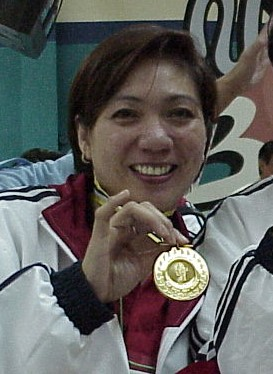
- Cerdeña at the 1999 SEA Games

Personal information
- Full name: Arianne Cerdeña-Valdez
- Born: March 11, 1962 (age 64)
- Years active: 1981–2001

Sport
- Country: Philippines
- Sport: Bowling
- Event: Ten-pin
- Coached by: Ernesto Lopa (1988)
- Retired: 2001

Achievements and titles
- Olympic finals: 1988 Summer Olympics: Demonstration sport – Gold
Medal record
Women's Bowling
Representing Philippines
Event	1st	2nd	3rd
Demonstration sport at the Olympic Games	1	–	–
World Bowling Championships	–	1	–
World Games	–	2	–
Asian Games	1	–	1
Asian Championships	1	2	1
Southeast Asian Games	5	5	2
Total	8	10	4
Demonstration sport at the Olympic Games
Gold medal – first place	1988 Seoul	Women Finals
World Tenpin Bowling Championships
Silver medal – second place	1983 Caracas	Trios
World Games
Silver medal – second place	Karlsruhe 1989	Singles
Silver medal – second place	Karlsruhe 1989	Doubles
Asian Games
Gold medal – first place	Seoul 1986	Team of 5
Bronze medal – third place	Seoul 1986	Doubles
Asian Championships
Silver medal – second place	Perth 1992	Masters
Gold medal – first place	Kuala Lumpur 1986	Doubles
Bronze medal – third place	Kuala Lumpur 1986	Trios
Silver medal – second place	Singapore 1984	Doubles
Southeast Asian Games
Gold medal – first place	Kuala Lumpur 2001	Doubles
Gold medal – first place	Bandar Seri Begawan 1999	Singles
Silver medal – second place	Manila 1991	Doubles
Silver medal – second place	Manila 1991	Team
Silver medal – second place	Manila 1991	All Events
Bronze medal – third place	Manila 1991	Masters
Gold medal – first place	Kuala Lumpur 1989	Masters
Gold medal – first place	Bangkok 1985	Trios
Silver medal – second place	Singapore 1983	Trios
Gold medal – first place	Singapore 1983	Team
Bronze medal – third place	Singapore 1983	Masters
Silver medal – second place	Manila 1981	Team

Arianne Cerdeña (born March 11, 1962) is a Filipino ten-pin bowling player. She is best known for winning the first gold medal for the Philippines in the Summer Olympics; albeit in a demonstration event hence the medal won was not counted in the official medal tally. She won the medal at the 1988 Summer Olympics in Seoul, South Korea. She is elected to the Philippine Sports Hall of Fame in March 2021.

== Career ==
Arianne Cerdeña debuted for the Philippine national team at the 1981 Southeast Asian Games. She won six gold medals overall in the regional games, including the single gold medal won by the Philippine bowling delegation in the 1999 edition in Brunei.

Cerdeña won a silver medal in Trios with Bong Coo and Lita de la Rosa in the quadrennial Fédération Internationale des Quilleurs FIQ World Championship now WTBA World Tenpin Bowling Championships in 1983 held in Caracas, Venezuela.

Cerdeña is an Asian Games Gold Medalist. She was a member of the gold medal Team of 5 event with Bong Coo, Catalina Solis, Cecilia Gaffud and Rebecca Watanabe and shared the doubles bronze medal with Bong Coo in the 1986 Asian Games in Seoul, South Korea.

Cerdeña returned to South Korea two years later to participate in the 1988 Summer Olympics where the bowling tournament is a demonstration event. Coached by Ernesto Lopa, she won the first Olympic gold medal for the Philippines outbesting Atsuko Asai of Japan. Although as a demonstration event, the medal was not counted in the official medal tally for the Games.

Cerdeña also captured two silver medals at the quadrennial World Games held at Karlsruhe, West Germany 1989, in singles and mixed doubles with Jorge Fernandez.

At the 1993 Bowling World Cup in Johannesburg, South Africa, Arianne Cerdeña won the Brent Peterson Country Award with Paeng Nepomuceno. She placed third in the singles event.

She retired from competitive bowling, last participating in the 2001 Southeast Asian Games where she clinched her last gold medal in the doubles event with Liza del Rosario, to focus more on her family.

== Personal life and post-retirement ==
Cerdeña is married to Raymond Valdez, a former dentistry student at the Centro Escolar University like herself with whom she has a daughter. After retiring, she settled in the United States in 2002 to join her husband who has been living in the US since 1988. Unable to find employment in the US she decided to study nursing along with her husband in Los Angeles. In 2004, she had a brief bout with ovarian cancer but she eventually recovered and became a registered nurse. As of 2021, she is working at the California Hospital Medical Center for at least five years already.

In 2021, Cerdeña was inducted to the Philippine Sports Hall of Fame.
