= Michael Schmidt (bowling) =

Canadian Ten-pin bowler (born 1980)

Michael Schmidt (born 26 October 1980 in Winnipeg) is a Canadian ten-pin bowler, best known for his performances in the QubicaAMF World Cup.

In 2005 he won the 7th Bowling World Cup title for Canada defeating Or Aviram of Israel in the men's final of the 41st QubicaAMF World Cup to give Canada its seventh Bowling World Cup title and a tie with the Philippines for the second most wins. He finished third in the 2006 QubicaAMF World Cup at Caracas, Venezuela. In the 2007 QubicaAMF World Cup in St. Petersburg, Russia, he finished fourth. In the 2009 QubicaAMF World Cup in Melaka, Malaysia, he lost in the men's final to Choi Yong-Kyu. In 2010, he won the QubicaAMF World Cup again defeating England's Matt Miller. With this victory, Schmidt became one of three men to win the QubicaAMF World Cup at least twice. In the 2011 QubicaAMF World Cup in Johannesburg, South Africa, Schmidt finished in 13th place. In the 2012 QubicaAMF World Cup in Wrocław, Poland, Schmidt finished 10th.

Schmidt has won the Bowling World Cup Canadian 10 pin National Championships eight times (2005-2007, 2009–2012, 2014). The winners of the Bowling World Cup Canadian ten-pin National Championships represents Canada in the QubicaAMF World Cup.

He is also a Pro Shop Operator currently at LaVerendrye Lanes in Winnipeg, MB, Canada.
