= Philippines at the 1986 Asian Games =

- IOC code: PHI
- NOC: Philippine Olympic Committee
- Website: www.olympic.ph (in English)

in Seoul
- Medals Ranked 6th: Gold 4 Silver 5 Bronze 9 Total 18

Asian Games appearances (overview)
- 1951; 1954; 1958; 1962; 1966; 1970; 1974; 1978; 1982; 1986; 1990; 1994; 1998; 2002; 2006; 2010; 2014; 2018; 2022; 2026

The Philippines participated in the 1986 Asian Games held in Seoul, South Korea from September 20 to October 5, 1986. and ranked 6th with 4 gold medals, 5 silver medals and 9 bronze medals for a total of 18 over-all medals.

== Asian Games Performance ==
Bong Coo emerged as the most successful Filipino campaigner with 2 gold medals in the (1) Individual ALL Events where she broke her own record in 24 games. She was also a member of the (2) Team of Five where the Philippines successfully defended their title in 1978 (bowling was not a part of the 1982 games). Other team members were Catalina Solis, Cecilia Gaffud, Rebecca Watanabe and Arianne Cerdeña.

Sprinter Lydia de Vega won the gold in the 100 meter and Ramon Brobio won the gold in individual men's golf.

Isidro del Prado, one of the country's greatest middle-distance runners of all time, won a silver in the 400 meter run, while boxer Leopoldo Cantancio lost in the lightweight class final to complete a five silver finish.

Basketball tasted a medal for the first time since 1962, winning the bronze medal with a gallant stand against powerhouses China and South Korea.

== Medalists ==
The following Philippine competitors won medals at the Games.

=== Gold ===
No.	Medal	Name	Sport	Event
1	Gold	Lydia de Vega	Athletics	Women's 100m
2	Gold	Bong Coo	Bowling	Women's All-Events
3	Gold	Bong Coo; Catalina Solis; Rebecca Watanabe; Arianne Cerdeña; Cecilia Gaffud	Bowling	Women's Team
4	Gold	Ramon Brobio	Golf	Men's Individual

=== Silver ===
No.	Medal	Name	Sport	Event
1	Silver	Isidro del Prado	Athletics	Men's 400m
2	Silver	Lydia de Vega	Athletics	Women's 200m
3	Silver	Rene Reyes	Bowling	Men's Singles
4	Silver	Delfin Garcia; Jorge Fernandez	Bowling	Men's Doubles
5	Silver	Leopoldo Cantancio	Boxing	Lightweight 60kg

=== Bronze ===
No.	Medal	Name	Sport	Event
1	Bronze	Romeo Gido; Honesto Larce; Leopoldo Arnillo; Isidro del Prado	Athletics	Men's 4 × 400 m Relay
2	Bronze	Eric Altamirano; Allan Caidic; Glenn Capacio; Harmon Codiñera; Jerry Codiñera; Jojo Lastimosa; Samboy Lim; Ronnie Magsanoc; Alvin Patrimonio; Dindo Pumaren; Elmer Reyes; Jack Tanuan	Basketball	Men's Team
3	Bronze	Bong Coo; Arianne Cerdeña	Bowling	Women's Doubles
4	Bronze	Catalina Solis	Bowling	Women's Masters
5	Bronze	Brix Flores	Boxing	Bantamweight 54kg
6	Bronze	Ernesto Coronel	Boxing	Light middleweight 71kg
7	Bronze	Bernardo Rimarim	Cycling	Track Men's Points Race
8	Bronze	Ramon Brobio; Robert Pactolerin; Wilfredo Victoria; Carito Villaroman	Golf	Men's Team
9	Bronze	Monsour del Rosario	Taekwondo	Lightweight -70kg

=== Multiple ===
Name	Sport	Gold	Silver	Bronze	Total
Bong Coo	Bowling	2	0	1	3
Lydia de Vega	Athletics	1	1	0	2
Arianne Cerdeña	Bowling	1	0	1	2
Catalina Solis	Bowling	1	0	1	2
Ramon Brobio	Golf	1	0	1	2
Isidro del Prado	Athletics	0	1	1	2

== Medal summary ==
=== Medal by sports ===
Sport	Gold	Silver	Bronze	Total
Bowling	2	2	2	6
Athletics	1	2	1	4
Golf	1	0	1	2
Boxing	0	1	2	3
Basketball	0	0	1	1
Cycling	0	0	1	1
Taekwondo	0	0	1	1
Totals (7 entries)	4	5	9	18

== Basketball ==
1986 Philippines Asian Games basketball team
- 1986 Asian Games: Bronze
Uniform
Uniform

The 1986 Philippines men's national basketball team, competed in the 1986 Asian Games. The team placed third, behind South Korea, and PR China.

Pos	No.	Player	College
PF	4	Alvin Patrimonio	Mapua
PG	5	Ronnie Magsanoc	UP Diliman
SG	6	Jojo Lastimosa	San Jose Recolletos
SF	7	Elmer Reyes	San Beda
SG	8	Allan Caidic	UE
SG	9	Samboy Lim	Letran
PG	10	Dindo Pumaren	La Salle
PG	11	Eric Altamirano	UP Diliman
SF/SG	12	Glenn Capacio	FEU
C/PF	13	Harmon Codinera	FEU
C	14	Jerry Codinera	UE
C	15	Jack Tanuan	FEU
