= Takeo Kamachi =

Japanese sports shooter (1936–2014)

Takeo Kamachi 蒲池猛夫
Personal information
- Native name: 蒲池猛夫
- Nationality: Japanese
- Born: 20 March 1936 Manchukuo (now northeast China)
- Died: 4 December 2014 (aged 78)

Sport
- Sport: Sports shooting
Medal record
Men's shooting
Representing Japan
Olympic Games
Gold medal – first place	1984 Los Angeles	25 metre pistol
Asian Games
Gold medal – first place	1966 Bangkok	Rapid fire pistol
Gold medal – first place	1970 Bangkok	Pistol team
Gold medal – first place	1970 Bangkok	Rapid fire pistol team
Gold medal – first place	1974 Tehran	Pistol team
Silver medal – second place	1978 Bangkok	Pistol team
Silver medal – second place	1978 Bangkok	Rapid fire pistol team
Bronze medal – third place	1974 Tehran	Rapid fire pistol team
Bronze medal – third place	1978 Bangkok	Rapid fire pistol

Takeo Kamachi (Japanese: 蒲池 猛夫; 20 March 1936 – 4 December 2014) was a Japanese sports shooter and Olympic champion, born in Manchukuo. He won a gold medal in the 25 metre rapid fire pistol at the 1984 Summer Olympics in Los Angeles.
