= Lee Seung-kyun =

South Korean sports shooter

Personal information
- Nationality: South Korean
- Born: 5 August 1932 (age 93)

Sport
- Sport: Sports shooting
Medal record
Men's shooting
Representing South Korea
Asian Games
Gold medal – first place	1974 Tehran	Skeet team
Silver medal – second place	1974 Tehran	Skeet
Silver medal – second place	1978 Bangkok	Skeet
Silver medal – second place	1978 Bangkok	Skeet team
Silver medal – second place	1986 Seoul	Skeet team

Lee Seung-kyun (born 5 August 1932) is a South Korean sports shooter. He competed in the mixed skeet event at the 1976 Summer Olympics.
