= Philippines at the 1978 Asian Games =

- IOC code: PHI
- NOC: Philippine Olympic Committee
- Website: www.olympic.ph (in English)

in Bangkok
- Medals Ranked 9th: Gold 4 Silver 4 Bronze 6 Total 14

Asian Games appearances (overview)
- 1951; 1954; 1958; 1962; 1966; 1970; 1974; 1978; 1982; 1986; 1990; 1994; 1998; 2002; 2006; 2010; 2014; 2018; 2022; 2026

The Philippines participated in the 1978 Asian Games held in Bangkok, Thailand from December 9 to December 20, 1978. Ranked ninth with four gold medals, four silver medals and six bronze medals with a total of 14 medals.

== Asian Games performance ==
Bowling was played for the first time, and the women's team led by Bong Coo won three of the country's total output of four gold medals. Bong Coo of bowling was the most successful Filipino campaigner. She won the masters, where she set a 15-game finals record with a 210 average, semi finals and grand finals records; in the singles event she set the Asian Games record and was a member of the champion team of five with Rosario de Leon, Lolita Reformado, Lita de la Rosa, and Nellie Castillo. Bong Coo also topped the individual all events where she set an Asian Games record.

The other gold medalist was Ral Rosario, who ruled the 200-meter freestyle in a national record of 1:56.68

== Medalists ==
The following Philippine competitors won medals at the Games.

=== Gold ===
No.	Medal	Name	Sport	Event
1	Gold	Bong Coo	Bowling	Women's Single
2	Gold	Bong Coo	Bowling	Women's Masters
3	Gold	Lita dela Rosa; Rosario de Leon; Lolita Reformado; Nellie Castillo; Bong Coo	Bowling	Women's Team
4	Gold	Gerardo Rosario	Swimming	Men's 200m Freestyle

=== Silver ===
No.	Medal	Name	Sport	Event
1	Silver	Rosario de Leon	Bowling	Women's Single
2	Silver	Lita dela Rosa; Lolita Reformado; Bong Coo	Bowling	Women's Trios
3	Silver	Rosario de Leon	Bowling	Women's Masters
4	Silver	Ruben Mares	Boxing	Lightweight 60kg

=== Bronze ===
No.	Medal	Name	Sport	Event
1	Bronze	Amelita Saberon; Lucila Tolentino; Lorena Morcilla; Lydia Silva-Netto	Athletics	Women's 4x100m Relay
2	Bronze	Lita dela Rosa; Nellie Castillo	Bowling	Women's Doubles
3	Bronze	Tito Sotto; Manny Sugatan; Jose Santos	Bowling	Men's Trios
4	Bronze	Gerardo Rosario	Swimming	Men's 100m Freestyle
5	Bronze	Mark Joseph	Swimming	Men's 1500m Freestyle
6	Bronze	Vicente Cheng; Mark Joseph; Jairulla Jaitulla; Gerardo Rosario	Swimming	Men's 4x200m Freestyle

=== Multiple ===
Name	Sport	Gold	Silver	Bronze	Total
Bong Coo	Bowling	3	1	0	4
Rosario de Leon	Bowling	1	2	0	3
Lita dela Rosa	Bowling	1	1	1	3
Lolita Reformado	Bowling	1	1	0	2
Gerardo Rosario	Swimming	1	0	2	3
Nellie Castillo	Bowling	1	0	1	2
Mark Joseph	Swimming	0	0	2	2

== Medal summary ==
=== Medal by sports ===
Sport	Gold	Silver	Bronze	Total
Bowling	3	3	2	8
Swimming	1	0	3	4
Boxing	0	1	0	1
Athletics	0	0	1	1
Totals (4 entries)	4	4	6	14
