= India at the 1978 Asian Games =

- IOC code: IND
- NOC: Indian Olympic Association

in Bangkok
- Medals Ranked 6th: Gold 11 Silver 11 Bronze 6 Total 28

Asian Games appearances (overview)
- 1951; 1954; 1958; 1962; 1966; 1970; 1974; 1978; 1982; 1986; 1990; 1994; 1998; 2002; 2006; 2010; 2014; 2018; 2022; 2026

India competed at the 1978 Asian Games held in Bangkok, Thailand. India ranked 6th with 11 gold medals.

== Medals by sport ==
Sport	Gold	Silver	Bronze	Total
Athletics	8	7	3	18
Boxing	0	1	2	3
Hockey	0	1	0	1
Sailing	0	1	0	1
Wrestling	2	1	0	3
Shooting	1	0	0	1
Tennis	0	0	1	1
Total	11	11	6	28

== Football ==
Head coach: (India) Arun Ghosh

No.	Pos.	Player	Date of birth (age)	Caps	Goals	Club
	GK	Bhaskar Ganguly				(All India Football Federation) East Bengal
	GK	Bhaskar Maity				(All India Football Federation) Bengal
	GK	Surjit Singh				
	DF	Gurdev Singh Gill (c)	20 April 1950 (aged 24)			(All India Football Federation) East Bengal
	DF	Chinmoy Chatterjee				(All India Football Federation) East Bengal
	DF	Shyamal Banerjee				(All India Football Federation) Bengal
	DF	Compton Dutta				(All India Football Federation) Bengal
	DF	Subrata Bhattacharya	3 March 1953 (aged 21)			(All India Football Federation) Mohun Bagan
	DF	Nicholas Pereira				
	DF	D. Sekaran				
	DF	Gurcharan Singh Parmar				
	MF	Prasun Banerjee	6 April 1955 (aged 19)			(All India Football Federation) East Bengal
	MF	Pushparaj Kumar				(All India Football Federation) Karnataka
	MF	A. Devraj Doraiswamy				(All India Football Federation) Karnataka
	MF	M.M. Jacob				
	MF	Thomas Fernandes				
	FW	Xavier Pius				(All India Football Federation) Mohun Bagan
	FW	Francis D'Souza				
	FW	Mohammed Akbar				
	FW	Harjinder Singh				(All India Football Federation) JCT Mills
	FW	Surajit Sengupta	30 August 1951 (aged 23)			(All India Football Federation) East Bengal
	FW	Bidesh Ranjan Bose	15 November 1953 (aged 21)			(All India Football Federation) Bengal

=== Preliminary round ===
Team	Pld	W	D	L	GF	GA	GD	Pts
Malaysia	2	2	0	0	2	0	+2	4
India	2	1	0	1	3	1	+2	2
Bangladesh	2	0	0	2	0	4	−4	0

10 December

India	0–1	Malaysia

Bangkok

14 December

Bangladesh	0–3	India

Bangkok

=== Semifinals ===
Team	Pld	W	D	L	GF	GA	GD	Pts
North Korea	3	2	1	0	6	3	+3	5
Iraq	3	2	0	1	6	1	+5	4
Kuwait	3	1	1	1	8	6	+2	3
India	3	0	0	3	2	12	−10	0

17 December

India	1–6	Kuwait

Bangkok

18 December

India	1–3	North Korea

Bangkok

19 December

India	0–3	Iraq
		Mahmoud 20'; Shaker 25'; Saeed 63'

Bangkok

== Field hockey ==
=== Team ===
Salim Abbasi
Vasudevan Baskaran
Pramod Batlaw
Sylvanus Dung Dung
Merwyn Fernandes
Olympio Fernandes
B. P. Govinda
Sukhbir Singh Grewal
Zafar Iqbal
Ashok Kumar
Victor Philips
Surjit Singh Randhawa
Allan Schofield
Ranbir Singh
Varinder Singh
Surinder Singh Sodhi

=== Preliminary round ===
Team	Pld	W	D	L	GF	GA	GD	Pts
India	3	3	0	0	16	4	+12	6
Malaysia	3	2	0	1	11	5	+6	4
Sri Lanka	3	1	0	2	4	8	−4	2
Hong Kong	3	0	0	3	2	16	−14	0

11 December

India	5–3	Malaysia

National Stadium, Bangkok

13 December

India	7–0	Hong Kong

National Stadium, Bangkok

15 December

India	4–1	Sri Lanka

National Stadium, Bangkok

=== Semifinals ===
17 December

India	2–0	Japan

National Stadium, Bangkok

=== Gold medal match ===
19 December

Pakistan	1–0	India

National Stadium, Bangkok
