= Mor Aviram =

Israeli ten-pin bowler

Mor Aviram (Hebrew: מור אבירם) is an Israeli ten-pin bowler. She finished in 18th position of the combined rankings at the 2006 AMF World Cup. She represented Israel in the 2004 and 2008 AMF World Cups as well.

Her brother, Or Aviram, is also a professional bowler, as was their mother, Sara Aviram.
