= Basketball at the 1986 Asian Games – Men's tournament =

Men at the 1986 Asian Games
- Venue: Jamsil Gymnasium
- Date: 22 September – 3 October 1986
- Nations: 8

Medalists
| gold medal | China |
| silver medal | South Korea |
| bronze medal | Philippines |

The 1986 Men's Asian Games Basketball Tournament was held in South Korea from September 22, 1986 to October 3, 1986.

== Results ==
| Pos | Team | Pld | W | L | PF | PA | PD | Pts |
|---|---|---|---|---|---|---|---|---|
| 1 | China | 7 | 7 | 0 | 674 | 458 | +216 | 14 |
| 2 | South Korea | 7 | 6 | 1 | 696 | 552 | +144 | 13 |
| 3 | Philippines | 7 | 5 | 2 | 633 | 591 | +42 | 12 |
| 4 | Jordan | 7 | 3 | 4 | 547 | 561 | −14 | 10 (Note: Head-to-head result: JOR 81–79 MAS.) |
| 5 | Malaysia | 7 | 3 | 4 | 544 | 589 | −45 | 10 |
| 6 | Japan | 7 | 2 | 5 | 531 | 540 | −9 | 9 (Note: Head-to-head result: JPN 62–53 KUW.) |
| 7 | Kuwait | 7 | 2 | 5 | 498 | 530 | −32 | 9 |
| 8 | Hong Kong | 7 | 0 | 7 | 403 | 705 | −302 | 7 |

Source: Results
Notes:

22 September

| South Korea | 98–94 | Jordan |

Jamsil Gymnasium, Seoul

22 September

| Hong Kong | 62–94 | Malaysia |

Jamsil Gymnasium, Seoul

22 September

| Japan | 78–81 | Philippines |

Jamsil Gymnasium, Seoul

22 September

| Kuwait | 75–99 | China |

Jamsil Gymnasium, Seoul

23 September

| Jordan | 73–70 | Japan |

Jamsil Gymnasium, Seoul

23 September

| Hong Kong | 75–109 | Philippines |

Jamsil Gymnasium, Seoul

24 September

| Kuwait | 89–45 | Hong Kong |

Jamsil Gymnasium, Seoul

24 September

| Jordan | 81–79 | Malaysia |

Jamsil Gymnasium, Seoul

24 September

| South Korea | 106–81 | Japan |

Jamsil Gymnasium, Seoul

24 September

| Philippines | 84–112 | China |

Jamsil Gymnasium, Seoul

26 September

| Hong Kong | 49–108 | China |

Jamsil Gymnasium, Seoul

26 September

| South Korea | 95–68 | Kuwait |

Jamsil Gymnasium, Seoul

27 September

| China | 94–54 | Jordan |

Jamsil Gymnasium, Seoul

27 September

| South Korea | 110–52 | Hong Kong |

Jamsil Gymnasium, Seoul

27 September

| Philippines | 90–74 | Kuwait |

Jamsil Gymnasium, Seoul

27 September

| Japan | 80–93 | Malaysia |

Jamsil Gymnasium, Seoul

28 September

| Jordan | 97–62 | Hong Kong |

Jamsil Gymnasium, Seoul

28 September

| Kuwait | 53–62 | Japan |

Jamsil Gymnasium, Seoul

28 September

| Malaysia | 60–108 | China |

Jamsil Gymnasium, Seoul

28 September

| South Korea | 103–102 | Philippines |

Jamsil Gymnasium, Seoul

30 September

| Jordan | 67–75 | Kuwait |

Jamsil Gymnasium, Seoul

30 September

| South Korea | 110–78 | Malaysia |

Jamsil Gymnasium, Seoul

1 October

| Malaysia | 68–84 | Philippines |

Jamsil Gymnasium, Seoul

1 October

| Japan | 62–76 | China |

Jamsil Gymnasium, Seoul

2 October

| Japan | 98–58 | Hong Kong |

Jamsil Gymnasium, Seoul

2 October

| Philippines | 83–81 | Jordan |

Jamsil Gymnasium, Seoul

3 October

| Malaysia | 72–64 | Kuwait |

Jamsil Gymnasium, Seoul

3 October

| South Korea | 74–77 | China |

Jamsil Gymnasium, Seoul

== Final standing ==
| Rank | Team | Pld | W | L |
|---|---|---|---|---|
| 1st place, gold medalist(s) | China | 7 | 7 | 0 |
| 2nd place, silver medalist(s) | South Korea | 7 | 6 | 1 |
| 3rd place, bronze medalist(s) | Philippines | 7 | 5 | 2 |
| 4 | Jordan | 7 | 3 | 4 |
| 5 | Malaysia | 7 | 3 | 4 |
| 6 | Japan | 7 | 2 | 5 |
| 7 | Kuwait | 7 | 2 | 5 |
| 8 | Hong Kong | 7 | 0 | 7 |
