= Jeanette Baker =

Australian ten-pin bowler

Medal record

Women's bowling

Representing Australia

World Senior Championships
| Bronze medal – third place | 2013 Las Vegas | Fours |

Jeanette Louise Baker (born 22 April 1955) is an Australian ten-pin bowler. She is the first Australian to win a World Tenpin Championship. She Won the AMF World Cup in 1982 in Scheveningen in the Netherlands and for a second time in 1983 in Mexico City, making her the only athlete to win back-to-back AMF World Cup titles ever. She won both titles from top seed.

Following her victory in Scheveningen, Baker took an office job with AMF in Australia. The Australian Tenpin Bowling Congress took notice, saying that the paid employment with a bowling company made Baker a "professional". This complaint was lodged in the days of "pure" amateurism, but an appeal to the Federation Internationale des Quilleurs, bowling's international governing body, restored Baker's amateur status but not before she had missed out on the 1983 FIQ World Championships.

Baker was named the World Bowling Writers Female Bowler of the Year in 1982 and elected to the (WBW) International Bowling Hall of Fame in 1994.
