= Bong Coo =

Filipino bowler

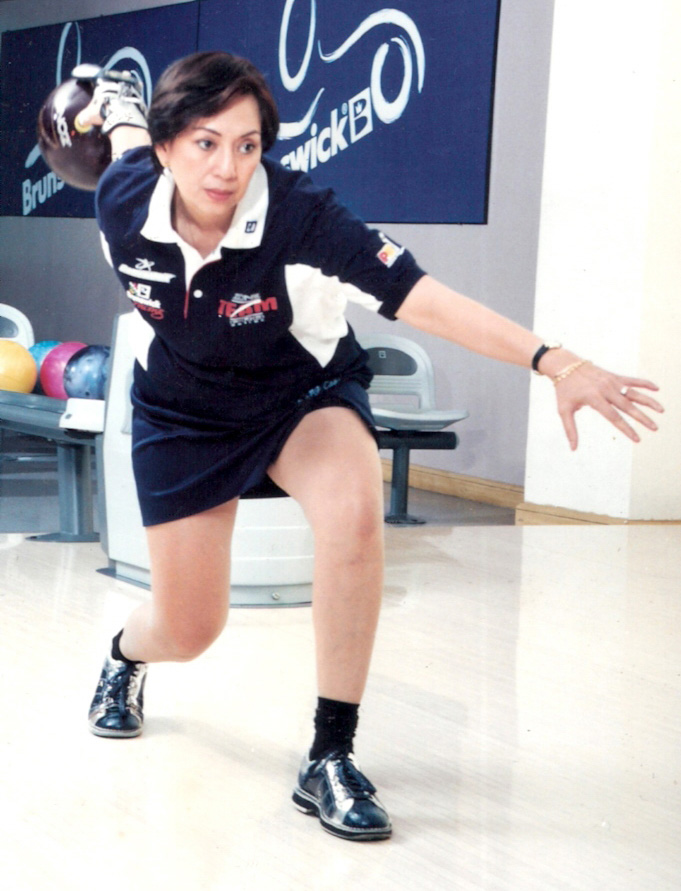
- Bong Coo in 1998

Commissioner of the Philippine Sports Commission
- Incumbent
- Assumed office 2022

Personal details
- Party: Aksyon Demokratiko
- Sports career
- Full name: Olivia G. Coo
- Nickname: Bong
- Born: June 3, 1948 (age 78) Manila, Philippines
- Education: St Scholastica's College; Philippine Women's University
- Occupations: Athlete (formerly), Coach, sports administrator, sporting apparel design consultant
- Years active: 1973–2000 as athlete
- Spouse: Eduardo Coo
- Website: www.thebowler.ph
- Country: Philippines
- Sport: Bowling

Sports achievements and titles
- World finals: 1979 & 1983 World Championships: Back-to-back All-Events Champion; 1979 AMF Bowling World Cup: Champion; 1979 World Championships: Doubles Champion
- Regional finals: 1978 Asian Games: Singles Champion; 1978 Asian Games: Masters Champion; 1986 Asian Games: All-Events Champion
Medal record
Representing Philippines
Women's Bowling
Event	1st	2nd	3rd
World Bowling Championships	3	2	–
World Games	–	–	1
Asian Games	5	1	3
Asian Championships	14	6	5
Asian Invitational Championships	7	6	5
Southeast Asian Games	8	8	4
Total	37	23	18
World Tenpin Bowling Championships
Gold medal – first place	1979 Manila	Doubles
Gold medal – first place	1979 Manila	All Events
Silver medal – second place	1979 Manila	Trios
Gold medal – first place	1983 Caracas	All Events
Silver medal – second place	1983 Caracas	Trios
World Games
Bronze medal – third place	London 1985	Doubles
Asian Games
Gold medal – first place	1978 Bangkok	Singles
Gold medal – first place	1978 Bangkok	Masters
Gold medal – first place	1978 Bangkok	Team
Silver medal – second place	1978 Bangkok	Trios
Bronze medal – third place	1978 Bangkok	Doubles
Gold medal – first place	1986 Seoul	All Events
Gold medal – first place	1986 Seoul	Team
Bronze medal – third place	1986 Seoul	Singles
Bronze medal – third place	1986 Seoul	Masters
Asian Championships
Gold medal – first place	1970 Singapore	Team
Silver medal – second place	1970 Singapore	Individual
Gold medal – first place	1972 Malaysia	Team
Gold medal – first place	1972 Malaysia	Trios
Gold medal – first place	1972 Malaysia	Doubles
Gold medal – first place	1972 Malaysia	All Events
Gold medal – first place	1972 Malaysia	Masters
Gold medal – first place	1974 Japan	Team
Bronze medal – third place	1974 Japan	Doubles
Gold medal – first place	1976 Indonesia	Team
Silver medal – second place	1976 Indonesia	Individual Event
Gold medal – first place	1978 Thailand	Singles
Silver medal – second place	1978 Thailand	Team
Silver medal – second place	1978 Thailand	Individual Event
Gold medal – first place	1984 Singapore	Singles
Silver medal – second place	1984 Singapore	Doubles
Bronze medal – third place	1984 Singapore	All Events
Gold medal – first place	1986 Malaysia	Doubles
Gold medal – first place	1986 Malaysia	All Events
Silver medal – second place	1986 Malaysia	Singles
Bronze medal – third place	1986 Malaysia	Trios
Gold medal – first place	1992 Australia	Doubles
Gold medal – first place	1992 Australia	Masters
Southeast Asian Games
Gold medal – first place	Manila 1981	Masters
Gold medal – first place	Manila 1981	All Events
Gold medal – first place	Manila 1981	Doubles
Gold medal – first place	Manila 1981	Trios
Silver medal – second place	Manila 1981	Singles
Silver medal – second place	Manila 1981	Team
Gold medal – first place	Singapore 1983	Team
Gold medal – first place	Singapore 1983	All Events
Silver medal – second place	Singapore 1983	Singles
Silver medal – second place	Singapore 1983	Trios
Silver medal – second place	Singapore 1983	Masters
Bronze medal – third place	Singapore 1983	Doubles
Gold medal – first place	Bangkok 1985	Team
Bronze medal – third place	Bangkok 1985	Grand Finals
Gold medal – first place	Indonesia 1987	Trios
Silver medal – second place	Indonesia 1987	Masters
Bronze medal – third place	Indonesia 1987	Team
Silver medal – second place	Manila 1991	Doubles
Silver medal – second place	Manila 1991	Team

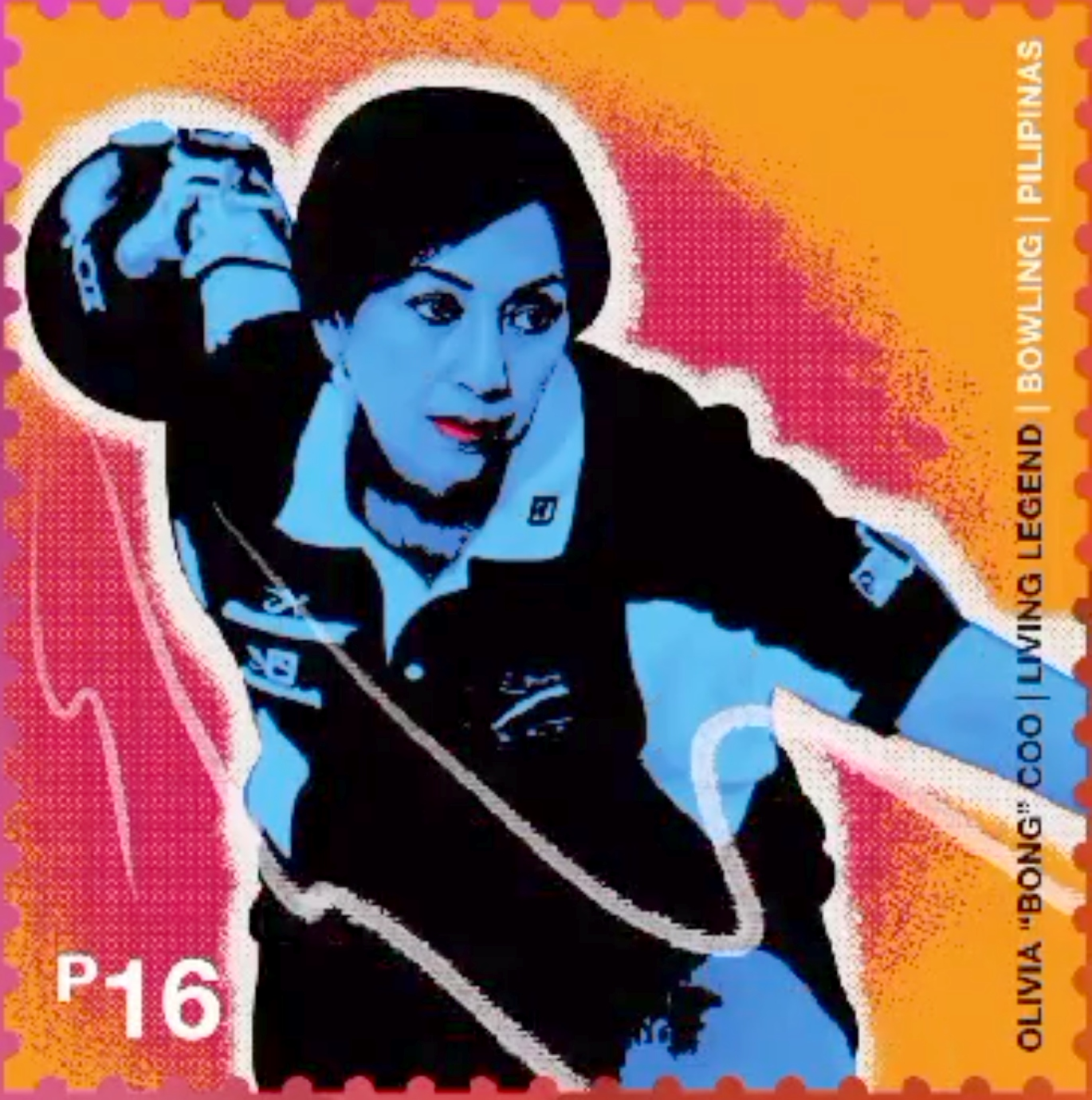
Bong Coo on a 2022 stamp of the Philippines

Olivia "Bong" Coo (born June 3, 1948) is a retired Filipino national athlete and sports administrator. Since July 2022, she has been serving as a Commissioner of the Philippine Sports Commission (PSC). She is regarded as the most decorated Filipino athlete. As a member of the Philippine national team, she has amassed a total of 78 medals won in regional and world competitions, 37 of which were gold medals. She is a 4-time world champion and a World Bowling Hall of Fame and Philippine Sports Hall of Fame member.

She is also the first Filipino athlete to make it to the Guinness Book of World Records twice. She has won a total of 137 championship titles with at least one Masters title for 28 consecutive years.

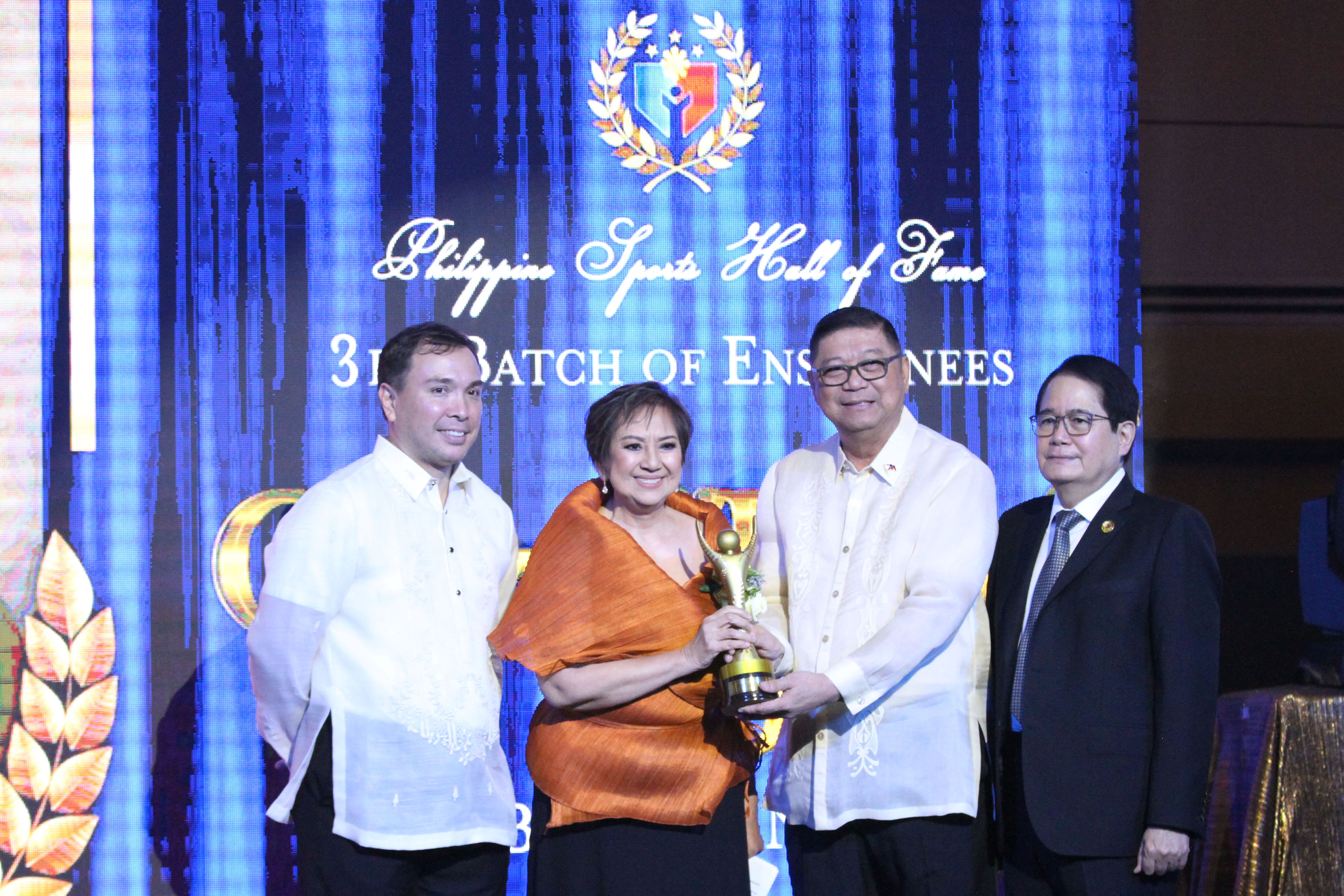
Bong Coo's induction to the Philippine Sports Hall of Fame in 2019.

In February 2022, the Philippine Postal Corporation honored her on a stamp as part of the Outstanding Filipinos Living Legends series in honor of the agency's 75th anniversary of its inaugural stamp.

She was named one of the "Greatest International Bowlers of All-Time" by the prestigious Bowlers Journal International in its November 2013 100-year anniversary issue and "Top 24 International Bowlers of All-Time" by the Bowlers Journal International edition in September 2004.

On July 20, 2022, President Bongbong Marcos appointed Coo to serve as a commissioner of the Philippine Sports Commission (PSC). She then previously served as the Officer-in-Charge of PSC.

== Early life ==
Coo married at 17 in 1965 and separated four years later with two sons. Coo was a talented athlete in high school, playing volleyball and softball at St. Scholastica College, but she had never bowled before. She began bowling casually at the age of 21 as a therapeutic sport following her separation. In 1969, she was encouraged to try out for the team and was accepted, winning her first gold medal at the 1970 Asian Zone Championships in Singapore. Two years later she won five gold medals out of six at the 1972 Asian Zone Championships in Malaysia.

Coo visited Canada in the mid-1970s to see some relatives and stayed in Toronto for six months. She would travel to New York to play match-play pot games against American male bowlers. During this period, her match play skills were sharpened and inspired her to take up the sport more seriously and increased her zeal. When she returned to the Philippines, she hired Madoka Amano, a Japanese coach, to help her train more effectively.

Coo's ascent to the top continued at the Asian Games in 1978, where she won every gold medal but one. Assemblyman Jose Puyat, who owns numerous bowling alleys, offered her $10,000 and a lifetime of free bowling. Pablo Carlos, the team's manager and Toyota dealer, gave her a Corona as a gift. President Ferdinand Marcos stated she could fly for free on Philippine Airlines for the rest of her life.

== Sports administration ==
From 1981 to 1985, Bong Coo worked as the associate sports director for the Philippine National Bank, a government-owned bank at the time, when she began her career in sport administration. This came after she received her 1981 civil service eligibility for professionals. She took time off of work to train for the 1986 Asian Games From 1988 through 1999, she worked as a sports consultant for SM Prime Holdings Inc. and SM Bowling Centers, as well as a number of private companies and government agencies, including the office of the vice mayor Vicente Sotto III of Quezon City in 1987. Since 1980, she has also had her own line of Bowling-themed clothing.

Coo served as secretary general for the Philippine Bowling Congress Inc. from 2004 to 2011 and the Philippine Bowling Federation Inc. from 2016 to 2022. She has been president of the Philippine Bowling Federation since June 17, 2022. Additionally, she has served as the Women in Sports Commission's chairperson for the Philippine Olympic Committee from February 2021. Coo is currently a commissioner of the Philippine Sports Commission since July 2022 and Officer-in-Charge from August 15–31, 2022. Coo is the first appointment of President Marcos in sports.

She joined the bowling capital equipment and consumer goods markets in the 1990s. She was the first to offer full-service interior design, architecture, and equipment supply. She helped build facilities in Cebu, Cabanatuan, Nueva Ecija, Quezon City, San Juan, Alabang, Batangas, and Manila, among other cities. The cover article of the June 2001 issue of International Bowling Industry Magazine featured her entitled "Lady of All Trades" .

== Retirement ==
She ran a bowling center after retiring from active competition, continued her apparel business, and has been a bowling instructor at the University of the Philippines under the Department of Human Kinetics at the University of the Philippines Diliman since 2001. Her syllabus was approved by the Philippine Department of Education in 2001.

She briefly participated in seniors competitions where she won two Seniors Master Titles in 2008 at age 60 and in 2012 at 64.

== Athletic career ==
=== Philippine Republic Act No. 9064 ===
Bong Coo is the most decorated Filipino athlete, regardless of gender, in any sport based on Republic Act No. 9064 known as Sports Benefits and Incentives Act of 2001. The law provides cash incentives and retirement benefits for National Athletes who win gold, silver and bronze medals in specific international competitions such as the Olympic Games, Quadrennial World Championships and Asian Games, all three played every fourth year and the Southeast Asian Games (SEA Games).

=== Guinness Book of Records and other records ===
Bong Coo is the first Filipino athlete to be inscribed in the Guinness Book of Records for her two-peat record-breaking efforts at the World Championships for All Events The first for her world record scores at the IX Fédération Internationale des Quilleurs (FIQ) World Championships in Manila in 1979, and the second at the (FIQ) World Championships in Caracas, Venezuela in 1983, where she successfully defended her All Events title. She is still the only athlete to win it twice. She also set the highest six-game record of the tournament in 1979 during the doubles gold medal event with Lita dela Rosa.

She has 137 tournament victories to her credit, including masters titles in each of twenty-eight (28) consecutive years from 1971 through 1998. She holds the Philippine record in the Asian Games for most gold medals won and the Asian record for most gold medals won in tenpin bowling with five. She also holds the record for most Asian Championship gold medals won, with 14 in 12 straight tournament appearances spanning 28 years.

=== All Events titles ===
All Events is the combined scores in 4 events: Singles, Doubles, Trios and 5-Team Event. Events are held over consecutive days and played in varying lane conditions and pace totaling 24 games, and the winners are determined by the combined performance in all. This category is regarded as the most prestigious medal in world bowling and named Most Valuable Athlete by the International Bowling Federation in its later editions.

An All-Events specialist, she is the only bowling athlete to have won titles and set records in this category in major biennial and quadrennial bowling tournaments at the same time in 1986. Bong Coo was named World Bowling Writers Female "World Bowler of the Year" that year.

==== Summary of her All-Events titles ====
- quadrennial World Championships Fédération Internationale des Quilleurs FIQ World Championship now called Bowling World Championships, consecutive in 1979 and 1983
- quadrennial Asian Games, consecutive in 1978 and 1986
- biennial Zone Championships (Fédération Internationale des Quilleurs now Asian Bowling Federation Championship now called Asian Championships), 14 years apart 1972 and 1986
- biennial South East Asian Games, consecutive in 1981 and 1983

=== Major individual and masters titles ===
In addition to her world All-Events titles, Bong Coo also won the QubicaAMF Bowling World Cup (1979), quadrennial Asian Games Singles and Masters (1978), the biennial Asian Championships Masters (twice, 20 years apart 1972 and 1992), the biennial FIQ Zone Championships Singles (twice 1978 and 1984) and the biennial South East Asian Games Masters (1981).

=== World Championships ===
At the 1979 World Championships in Manila and the 1983 World Championships in Caracas, Venezuela, Bong Coo won back-to-back All-Events titles. She is remains the only athlete to have won it twice in a row.

She and Lita dela Rosa won the doubles gold and the trios silver with Nellie Castillo at the 1979 World Championships in Manila. Bong and Lita won silver with Arianne Cerdeña at the 1983 World Championships in Caracas, Venezuela.

=== Asian Games ===
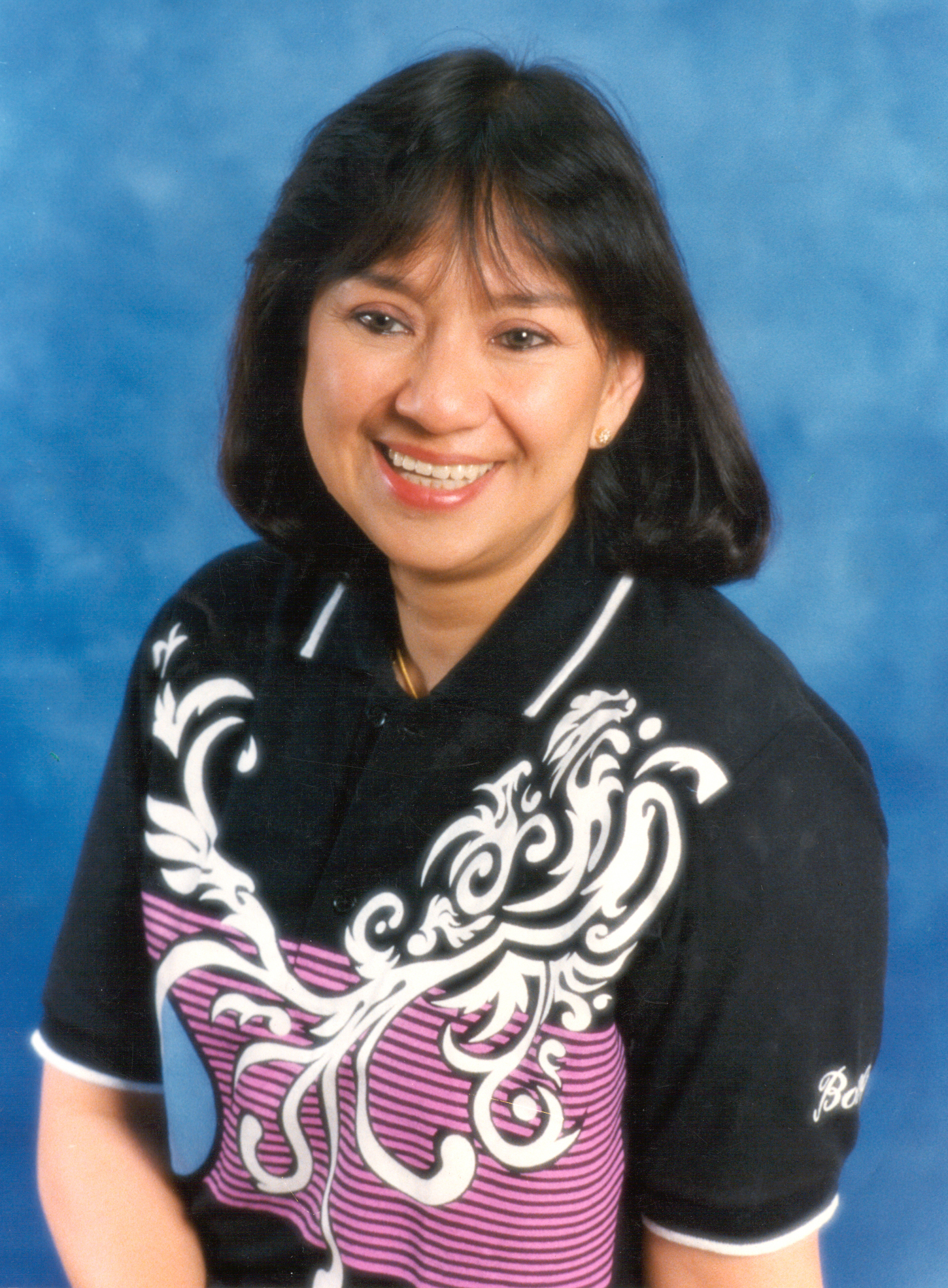
Bong Coo in 1994

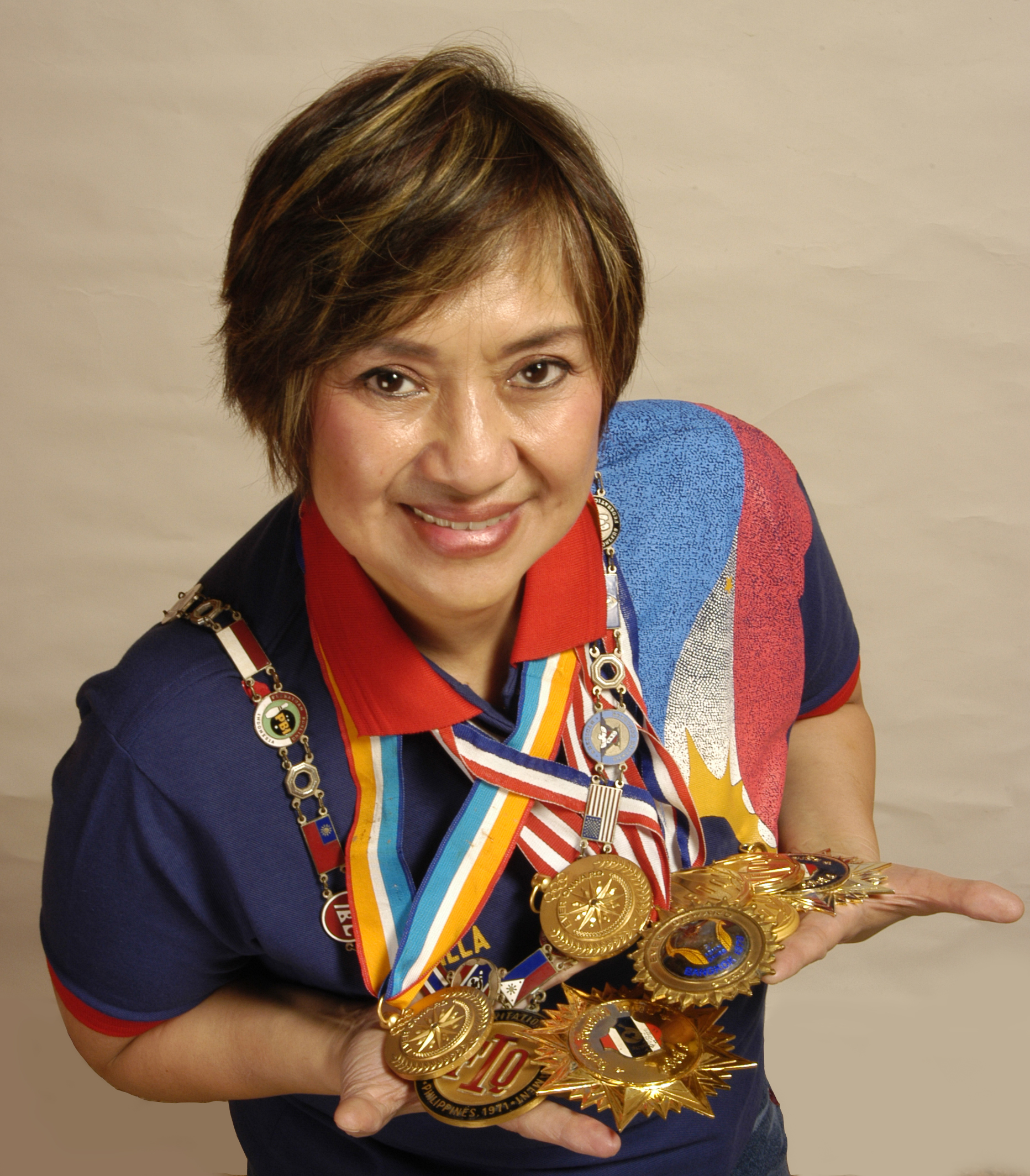
Bong Coo with some of her medals taken in 2004

Apart from the Olympic Games, the quadrennial Asian Games is the most prestigious games among Asian governments.

Bong Coo owns the most number of Asian Games gold medals among all Filipino and Asian bowling athletes, winning five gold medals in consecutive participations in 1979 and 1986, minus New Delhi in 1983 where bowling was excluded. In addition to her five gold medals, she won two silver and one bronze medals.

Bong Coo achieved what experts believe to be a historic record by winning all the individual events at the 1978 Asian Games in Bangkok Thailand, she won the Singles, topped the All-Events, and won the Masters.

After three decades, her total five gold medal record haul was equaled by Lee Na-young when she was part of the Korean 6-women Team Gold medal winner at Palembang, Jakarta in 2018. Lee Na—young won the gold medals in Doubles, Trios, Masters and All Events at the 2014 Games. Bong Coo also won the All-Events title at the 1978 Asian Games, despite the fact that no medals were awarded, she successfully defended her All-Events title in 1986.

=== Asian championships ===
Bong Coo won the most gold medals in the biennial Asian Bowling Championships which includes athletes from Australia, New Zealand and the Western Pacific, with 14 gold medals in 12 consecutive tournament participation. Her Zone Masters titles were acknowledged by the World Bowling Writers Hall of Fame Committee equivalent to world medals. To this day she still holds the most gold medals won in the FIQ Zone Championships in one celebration with 5 gold medals in 6 events. She also earned eight gold medals from Asian invitational championships in the 5th Asian Bowling Federation championships in Bangkok, 1971 and 1973 FIQ Asian Invitational in San Juan and Singapore respectively.

=== Southeast Asian Games ===
The Southeast Asian Games also known as the SEA Games, is a biennial multi-sport event involving participants from the current 11 countries of Southeast Asia.

During opening ceremonies of 30th edition of South East Asian Games held in Manila in 2019, she was honored as one of the "Greatest of All Time" athlete flag bearers of the South East Asian Games Federation flag, with legendary sprinter Lydia de Vega, Swimmers Akiko Thompson and Eric Buhain, Basketball star Alvin Patrimonio, fellow champion bowler Paeng Nepomuceno, billiards great Efren "Bata"Reyes and Olympic silver medalist Onyok Velasco.

The Philippines hosted the Southeast Asian Games for the first time in 1981. Bong Coo emerged as its most successful Filipino campaigner. She won six medals in six events, four of which were gold medals where she set six individual game records. Bong won the gold in Ladies Doubles with Lita de la Rosa and averaged 221 in Trios en route to an Individual All Events gold medal and became the South East Asian Games Masters champion.

== Awards and tributes ==
=== International and National Hall of Fame ===
She became one of the first ever inductees when the International Bowling Hall of Fame was inaugurated in 1993. The other inductees were compatriot Paeng Nepomuceno and Sweden's Annete Hagre. The International Bowling Hall of Fame and Museum is located in Arlington, Texas.

She was among the third batch of inductees to the Philippine Sports Hall of Fame with fellow bowlers Paeng Nepomuceno and Lita Dela Rosa on November 22, 2018.

=== Commemorative stamp ===
Coo was honored by the Philippine Postal Corporation with a commemorative stamp bearing her image on February 22, 2022. It marks the 75th anniversary of the first postal stamp and part of the “Salamat-Pagpupugay sa mga Alamat series” (tribute to legend series).

=== Bong Coo MVP Bowling Ball ===
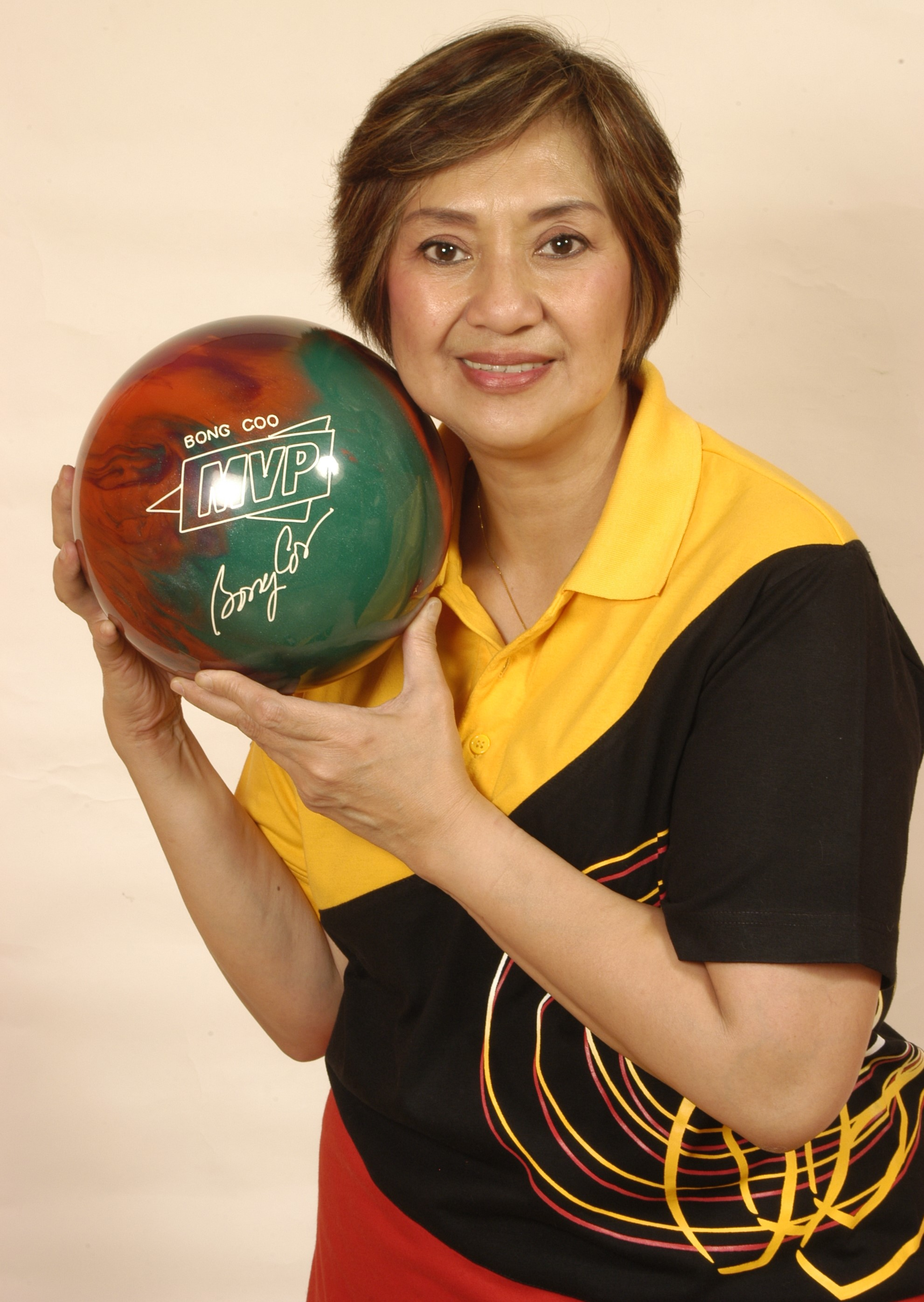
Bong Coo in 2004 with Brunswick MVP Pearl Bowling Ball

Brunswick released the Bong Coo MVP Solid reactive ball in 2001 and the Bong Coo MVP Pearl in 2003. Both bowling balls are approved by the USBC (United States Bowling Congress) and International Bowling Federation for use in international competitions. In 2003, the Overseas Filipino Workers (OFW) bowlers honored her through the Filipino bowlers of UAE in the "Bong Coo MVP Cup" participated in by OFW's from Brunei, Malaysia, Guam, California, Saudi Arabia, Qatar, Kuwait, United Arab Emirates, Hong Kong and Singapore. She provides free bowling training to youth bowlers from OFW families.

=== IOC and POC Awards ===
She was awarded an Achievement Diploma by the International Olympic Committee president Juan Antonio Samaranch in recognition of her outstanding contribution in promoting the development and participation of women and girls in sports, she was 17-years earlier awarded the Philippine Olympic Medal of Honor.

=== PSA Lifetime Achievement Award and Athlete of the Year ===
She was honored by the Philippine Sports Association (PSA) a Lifetime Achievement award on February 26, 2019, where she was a four time Athlete of the Year awardee and a member of its Hall of Fame.

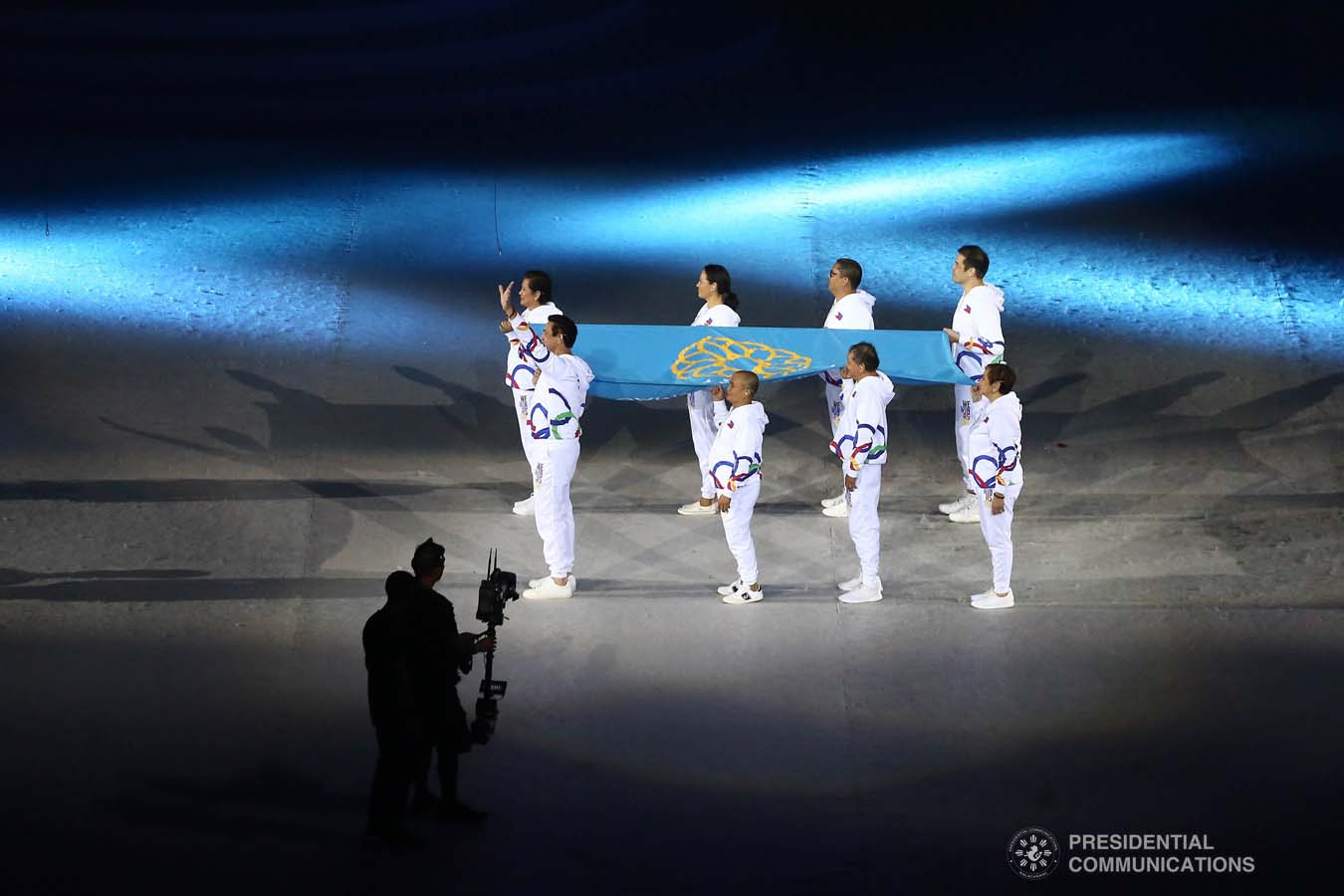
Bong Coo carries the Southeast Asian (SEA) Games Federation flag with other Filipino sports greats during the opening ceremony of the 30th SEA Games at the Philippine Arena in Bocaue, Bulacan on November 30, 2019

=== Athlete of the Millennium ===
In 2000, Bong Coo was voted one of the Philippines Athlete of the Millennium with Paeng Nepomuceno, boxing legends Gabriel “Flash” Elorde and Pancho Villa, amateur boxers and Olympic silver medal winners Anthony Villanueva at the 1964 Tokyo games and Mansueto “Onyok” Velasco at the 1996 Atlanta Games; Asia's first chess Grandmaster Eugene Torre, basketball phenom Carlos Loyzaga, swimmer Teofilo Yldefonso, tennis’ Ampon and sprinter De Vega.

=== Civic Award ===
She was also named one of the Ten Outstanding Women for the Nations Service (TOWNS) in 1986. The TOWNS award is conferred every three years by the TOWNS Foundation on Filipino women who have rendered outstanding service to the nation.

== Honors ==
- First Filipino Athlete listed in the Guinness Book of World Records
- Inaugural member to the World Bowling Writers International Bowling Hall of Fame (1993) at the International Bowling Hall of Fame and Museum, in St. Louis, Missouri, USA with compatriot Paeng Nepomuceno (in 2010 the Hall of Fame Museum moved to Arlington, Texas)
- One of the "Greatest International Bowlers of All-Time" by the Bowlers Journal International Bowling Lists 100 Year Celebration, Nov. 2013
- Selected to the "Top 24 International Bowlers of All-Time" by the Bowlers Journal International edition, Sept. 2004
- Most bemedalled Filipino athlete per Republic Act 9064 "Athletes Incentives Act of 2001"
- Most gold medals won by a Filipino athlete in the quadrennial Asian Games with five
- Most bemedalled Filipino athlete in the Asian Games in one celebration 1978 held in Bangkok, Thailand
- Most Gold Medal in the biennial FIQ Zone Championships with 14 in 12 consecutive participation in 28 years
- Most Gold Medal won in FIQ Zone Championships in one celebration 5 gold medals in 6 events
- Most successful Filipino campaigner in the 1981 South East Asian Games Held in Manila with 4 gold and 2 silver medals in 6 events
- Total of 137 bowling tournament titles
- Named "Athlete of the Millennium" by the Philippine Sportswriters Association in 2000
- Awarded an Achievement Diploma by the International Olympic Committee (IOC) president Juan Antonio Samaranch in 2000 in recognition of her outstanding contribution in promoting the development and participation of women and girls in sports
- World Bowling Writers World Bowler of the year in 1986, the WBW has a membership of over 300 bowling writers worldwide
- Fédération Internationale des Quilleurs Woman Bowler of Year for 1992–1993
- Voted Asia's Most Durable Bowler in 1992
- Voted World Bowler of the Year in 1986
- Held the All Events games records in the national, regional level, and world level championships in biennial and quadrennial games simultaneously in 1986
- Named " Athlete of the Year" Philippine Sportswriters Association in 1982, 1983, 1984 and 1986
- 13-time Philippine Sportswriters Association Bowler of the Year
- Awarded the Philippine Olympic Medal of Honor in 1983 and Bowler of the Decade
- Named Asia's Bowling Queen in 1972
- Set three world records in consecutive World Championships in 1979 and 1983, one world record in the 1979 World Cup, seven Asian records in the Zone Championships in 1986 and 1992, five Asian records in consecutive Asian Games in 1978 and 1986 and six South East Asian Games records at the SEAG in 1981
- One of the 100 Filipinas featured in Filipina Firsts: A Salute to 100 Women Pioneers 1898–1998
- Only athlete included in the Philippines 100 Women of the Century in 2000
- Chosen one the country's "Inspiring Mothers" by the Family Today Magazine in 2000
- Awarded "Kababaihang Makasaysayan" by the National Centennial Commission- Women Sector – ensured women's visibility in history and nation building through Global Movement for Herstories, 1999
- Honored in the first ICHPER-SD Asia Conference Sport Covenant for Women - for uplifting the status of women in sports, 1998
- All Filipino Sports Awards Athlete of the Year for Bowling, 1973 and 1975
- Named one of the Ten Outstanding Women for the Nations Service (TOWNS) in 1986. The TOWNS Award is conferred every three years by the TOWNS Foundation on Filipino women who have rendered outstanding service to the nation; The TOWNS Foundation is dynamic group of empowered Filipino women leaders who have contributed positively to shaping the nation's future and serving as a catalyst for economic and social development by providing their time, talent and resources to government organizations
- Received citations from both houses of Congress in 1993
- Philippine Sportswriters Association Hall of Fame member
- 50 Greatest Filipino Athletes of All-Time

== Politics ==
Coo ran for senate in 2004 under Aksyon Demokratiko, but lost.
