= Malaysia at the 1978 Asian Games =

- IOC code: MAS
- NOC: Olympic Council of Malaysia
- Website: www.olympic.org.my (in English)

in Bangkok
- Competitors: 158 in 13 sports
- Medals Ranked 12th: Gold 2 Silver 1 Bronze 3 Total 6

Asian Games appearances (overview)
- 1954; 1958; 1962; 1966; 1970; 1974; 1978; 1982; 1986; 1990; 1994; 1998; 2002; 2006; 2010; 2014; 2018; 2022; 2026

Other related appearances
- North Borneo (1954, 1958, 1962); Sarawak (1962)

Malaysia competed in the 1978 Asian Games held in Bangkok, Thailand from 9 to 20 September 1978. Athletes from Malaysia won overall six medal and finished 12th in a medal table.

== Medal summary ==
=== Medals by sport ===
Sport	Gold	Silver	Bronze	Total	Rank
Athletics	1	1	1	3	7
Bowling	1	0	0	1	5
Boxing	0	0	1	1	12
Field hockey	0	0	1	1	3
Total	2	1	3	6	12

=== Medallists ===
Medal	Name	Sport	Event
Gold	Saik Oik Cum	Athletics	Women's 400 metres
Gold	Alan Hooi; Khoo Boo Jin; Edward Lim; Holloway Cheah; P. S. Nathan; Lee Kok Hong	Bowling	Men's team of 5
Silver	Vellasamy Subramaniam	Athletics	Men's 20 kilometres road walk
Bronze	Khoo Chong Beng	Athletics	Men's 20 kilometres road walk
Bronze	Yusoff Hashim	Boxing	Men's 67 kg
Bronze	Malaysia national field hockey team	Field hockey	Men's tournament

== Athletics ==
Key

- Note–Ranks given for track events are within the athlete's heat only
- Q = Qualified for the next round
- q = Qualified for the next round as a fastest loser or, in field events, by position without achieving the qualifying target
- NR = National record
- N/A = Round not applicable for the event
- Bye = Athlete not required to compete in round

Men
Road event

Athlete	Event	Final	
Athlete	Event	Time	Rank
Vellasamy Subramaniam	20 km road walk	1:31:59	2nd place, silver medalist(s)
Khoo Chong Beng	20 km road walk	1:33:57	3rd place, bronze medalist(s)

Women
Track event

Athlete	Event	Final	
Athlete	Event	Time	Rank
Saik Oik Cum	400 m	55.09	1st place, gold medalist(s)

== Basketball ==
=== Men's tournament ===
Group B

Team	Pld	W	L
North Korea	4	4	0
Japan	4	3	1
Malaysia	4	2	2
Hong Kong	4	1	3
Qatar	4	0	4

Qualified for the finals

9 December

Japan	88–73	Malaysia

Nimibutr Indoor Stadium, National Sports Complex, Bangkok

10 December

North Korea	74–63	Malaysia

Nimibutr Indoor Stadium, National Sports Complex, Bangkok

12 December

Malaysia	114–76	Hong Kong

Nimibutr Indoor Stadium, National Sports Complex, Bangkok

13 December

Malaysia	163–37	Qatar

Nimibutr Indoor Stadium, National Sports Complex, Bangkok

Seventh to fourteenth place classification

Team	Pld	W	L
Malaysia	7	6	1
Pakistan	7	6	1
Iraq	7	5	2
Kuwait	7	4	3
Hong Kong	7	3	4
Saudi Arabia	7	3	4
Bahrain	7	1	6
Qatar	7	0	7

14 December

Malaysia	101–88	Pakistan

Nimibutr Indoor Stadium, National Sports Complex, Bangkok

15 December

Malaysia	vs.	Bahrain

Nimibutr Indoor Stadium, National Sports Complex, Bangkok

16 December

Malaysia	vs.	Qatar

Nimibutr Indoor Stadium, National Sports Complex, Bangkok

17 December

Malaysia	94–88	Saudi Arabia

Nimibutr Indoor Stadium, National Sports Complex, Bangkok

18 December

Malaysia	vs.	Iraq

Nimibutr Indoor Stadium, National Sports Complex, Bangkok

19 December

Kuwait	66–65	Malaysia

Nimibutr Indoor Stadium, National Sports Complex, Bangkok

20 December

Malaysia	vs.	Hong Kong

Nimibutr Indoor Stadium, National Sports Complex, Bangkok

Ranked 7th in final standings

=== Women's tournament ===
Final round

Team	Pld	W	L
South Korea	4	4	0
China	4	3	1
Japan	4	2	2
Thailand	4	1	3
Malaysia	4	0	4

10 December

Thailand	61–53	Malaysia

Nimibutr Indoor Stadium, National Sports Complex, Bangkok

12 December

South Korea	108–20	Malaysia

Nimibutr Indoor Stadium, National Sports Complex, Bangkok

15 December

China	vs.	Malaysia

Nimibutr Indoor Stadium, National Sports Complex, Bangkok

17 December

Japan	85–29	Malaysia

Nimibutr Indoor Stadium, National Sports Complex, Bangkok

Ranked 5th in final standings

== Boxing ==
Athlete	Event	Final	Rank
Athlete	Event	Opposition Score	Rank
Yusoff Hashim	Men's 67 kg		3rd place, bronze medalist(s)

== Field hockey ==
=== Men's tournament ===
Bronze medal match

Malaysia	2–1	Japan

Bangkok

Ranked 3rd in final standings

== Football ==
=== Men's tournament ===
Preliminary round; Group C

Team	Pts	Pld	W	D	L	GF	GA	GD
Malaysia	4	2	2	0	0	2	0	+2
India	2	2	1	0	1	3	1	+2
Bangladesh	0	2	0	0	2	0	4	−4

Qualified for the semifinals

Malaysia	1 – 0	India

Bangladesh	0 – 1	Malaysia

Semifinal; Group 2

Team	Pts	Pld	W	D	L	GF	GA	GD
South Korea	6	3	3	0	0	5	1	+4
China	4	3	2	0	1	11	3	+8
Thailand	2	3	1	0	2	4	8	−4
Malaysia	0	3	0	0	3	2	10	−8

Qualified for the gold medal match
Qualified for the bronze medal match

Thailand	2 – 1	Malaysia

Malaysia	1 – 7	China

South Korea	1 – 0	Malaysia

Ranked 7th in final standings
