= Pakistan at the 1978 Asian Games =

- IOC code: PAK
- NOC: Pakistan Olympic Association

in Bangkok
- Medals Ranked 8th: Gold 4 Silver 4 Bronze 9 Total 17

Asian Games appearances (overview)
- 1954; 1958; 1962; 1966; 1970; 1974; 1978; 1982; 1986; 1990; 1994; 1998; 2002; 2006; 2010; 2014; 2018; 2022; 2026

Pakistan participated in the 8th Asian Games in Bangkok, Thailand in 1978. These Games were originally scheduled to be held in its capital, Islamabad. Pakistan's four gold medals at these Games came in boxing, field hockey and sailing.

== Medallists ==
Medal	Name	Sport	Discipline
Gold	Iqbal Muhammad	Boxing	Lt. Heavy Weight (Men)
Gold	Imtiaz Mahmood	Boxing	Heavy Weight (Men)
Gold	Pakistan hockey team	Field hockey	Men
Gold	Byram Avari; Munir Sadiq	Sailing	Enterprise Class
