= Bowling at the 1986 Asian Games =

- Venue: Dong Seoul Grand Bowling Center
- Dates: 26 September – 1 October 1986

Bowling took place for the men's and women's individual, doubles, trios, and team events at the 1986 Asian Games in Dong Seoul Grand Bowling Center, Seoul, South Korea from September 26 to October 1.

== Medalists ==
=== Men ===
Event	Gold	Silver	Bronze
Singles	Masami Hirai; Japan	Rene Reyes; Philippines	Ringo Wang; Malaysia
Doubles	Japan; Kengo Tagata; Hiroshi Ishihara	Philippines; Delfin Garcia; Jorge Fernandez	Thailand; Montri Setvipisinee; Surachai Kasemsiriroj
Trios	Japan; Masami Hirai; Kengo Tagata; Hiroshi Ishihara	Singapore; Mike Wee; Jansen Chan; Ronnie Ng	Malaysia; Allan Lee; Stanley Tai; Edward Lim
Team of 5	Thailand; Montri Setvipisinee; Sinchai Khluabkaew; Saravut Maneerat; Surachai Kasemsiriroj; Supote Peerasophon	Japan; Masami Hirai; Takashi Shino; Sasagu Tokashiki; Kengo Tagata; Hiroshi Ishihara; Kosaku Tatemoto	South Korea; Cho Kwang-myung; Byun Yong-hwan; Baek Hung-kee; Yoo Chung-hee; Suh Bom-sok; Huh Jung-chul
All-events	Hiroshi Ishihara; Japan	Ringo Wang; Malaysia	Takashi Shino; Japan
Masters	Byun Yong-hwan; South Korea	Takashi Shino; Japan	Masami Hirai; Japan

=== Women ===
Event	Gold	Silver	Bronze
Singles	Catherine Che; Hong Kong	Wannasiri Duangdee; Thailand	Pannipa Sangtian; Thailand
Doubles	Japan; Kumiko Inatsu; Yoshiko Ichiba	Japan; Atsuko Asai; Mayumi Hayashi	Philippines; Bong Coo; Arianne Cerdeña
Trios	Japan; Kumiko Inatsu; Kyoko Yamaguchi; Yoshiko Ichiba	Thailand; Sudsomying Sukkasung; Wannasiri Duangdee; Anantita Hongsophon	Indonesia; Sri Mulyani Ruzgar; Fenny Tjahjo; Charlotte Sjamsuddin
Team of 5	Philippines; Bong Coo; Catalina Solis; Rebecca Watanabe; Arianne Cerdeña; Cecilia Gaffud	Japan; Kumiko Inatsu; Kyoko Yamaguchi; Atsuko Asai; Mayumi Hayashi; Yoshiko Ichiba; Yoshiko Sakamaru	South Korea; Lee Ji-yeon; Sun Yeon-suk; Lee Sang-jin; Kim Hee-sook; Yang Ae-suk; Choi Myung-ji
All-events	Bong Coo; Philippines	Mayumi Hayashi; Japan	Poppy Marijke Tambis; Indonesia
Masters	Lee Ji-yeon; South Korea	Catherine Che; Hong Kong	Catalina Solis; Philippines

== Medal table ==
Rank	Nation	Gold	Silver	Bronze	Total
1	Japan (JPN)	6	5	2	13
2	Philippines (PHI)	2	2	2	6
3	South Korea (KOR)	2	0	2	4
4	Thailand (THA)	1	2	2	5
5	Hong Kong (HKG)	1	1	0	2
6	Malaysia (MAL)	0	1	2	3
7	Singapore (SIN)	0	1	0	1
8	Indonesia (INA)	0	0	2	2
Totals (8 entries)		12	12	12	36
