= Cathy Townsend =

Canadian ten-pin bowler (born 1937)

Personal information
- Born: June 8, 1937 (age 89) Campbellton, New Brunswick
Medal record
Ten-pin bowling
Representing Canada
QubicaAMF Bowling World Cup
Gold medal – first place	1975 Makati	Women's

Cathy Townsend (born June 8, 1937) was a Canadian ten-pin bowler. Townsend became one of the first Canadian women to win gold at the World Bowling American Zone Championships in 1974. The following year, she was the first woman of Canada to win the QubicaAMF Bowling World Cup. Townsend was inducted into the Canada's Sports Hall of Fame in 1977 and the Canadian Tenpin Federation Hall of Fame in 1994.

== Early life and education ==
On June 8, 1937, Townsend was born in Campbellton, New Brunswick. She began her bowling career in 1963.

== Career ==
In 1967, Townsend participated in the WTBA World Tenpin Bowling Championships but did not win a medal. From 1969 to 1971, she had won silver at the Tournament of the Americas. In 1974, Townsend also won gold in the doubles event at the Fédération Internationale des Quilleurs American Zone Championships alongside Joanne Walker Keefe. She became one of the first Canadian women to receive a gold medal in this championship. At the same competition, Townsend won silver in the four-woman and bronze in the five-woman events.

The following year, Townsend participated in the 1975 World Tenpin Bowling Championships and became the first woman of Canada to win the QubicaAMF Bowling World Cup. After the World Cup, Townsend withdrew from the competition due to an arm injury. She returned to bowling in the summer of 1976. After returning to bowling, she won gold at the 1976 Tournament of the Americas in the all-events and mixed four competitions. In 1981, Townsend won bronze in the five-woman event at the Pan American Bowling Confederation Championships. Outside of bowling, Townsend was a stenographer.

== Awards and honors ==
Townsend was inducted into the Canada's Sports Hall of Fame in 1977 and the Canadian Tenpin Federation Hall of Fame in 1994.
