= Dorjzovdyn Ganbat =

Mongolian wrestler (born 1950)

Personal information
- Born: 15 August 1950 (age 75)
Medal record
Men's freestyle wrestling
Representing Mongolia
Asian Games
Bronze medal – third place	1978 Bangkok	52 kg

Dorjzovdyn Ganbat (born 15 August 1950) is a Mongolian former wrestler who competed in the 1972 Summer Olympics.
