= 1978 Asian Games medal table =

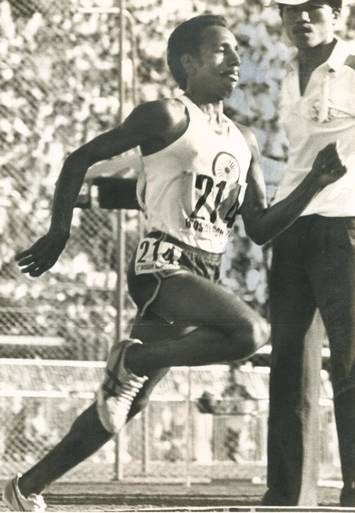
- India's Hari Chand speeds to victory in the 10000 meter run and an Asian gold medal in the opening day of Asian Games track and field events in Bangkok on December 15, 1978.
- Location: Bangkok, Thailand

Highlights
- Most gold medals: Japan 70
- Most total medals: Japan 178
- Medalling NOCs: 19

The 1978 Asian Games (also known as the VIII Asiad), was a multi-sport event held in Bangkok, Thailand from 9 December to 20 December 1978. Originally, the host city was to be Singapore, but it dropped its plan to host the Games due to financial problems. Then the capital of Pakistan, Islamabad, was subsequently chosen to host the games. However Pakistan also dropped its plan to host the games due to conflicts with Bangladesh and India.

A total of 3842 athletes from 25 National Olympic Committees (NOCs) participated in these games, competing in 147 events in 19 sports. Archery and bowling were included for the first time. This medal table ranks the participating NOCs by the number of gold medals won by their athletes.

Athletes from 19 participating NOCs won at least one medal; athletes from 15 of these NOCs secured at least one gold. Athletes from Japan won 70 gold medals, the most of any nation at these Asiad. China finished second in total medals. South Korea finished fourth in total medals. Host nation Thailand finished the games with 42 medals overall (11 gold, 12 silver and 19 bronze), in fifth spot in terms of total medals.

== Medal table ==
The ranking in this table is consistent with International Olympic Committee convention in its published medal tables. By default, the table is ordered by the number of gold medals the athletes from a nation have won (in this context, a nation is an entity represented by a National Olympic Committee). The number of silver medals is taken into consideration next and then the number of bronze medals. If nations are still tied, equal ranking is given; they are listed alphabetically by IOC country code.

* Host nation (Thailand)

Rank	Nation	Gold	Silver	Bronze	Total
1	Japan (JPN)	70	59	49	178
2	China (CHN)	51	54	46	151
3	South Korea (KOR)	18	20	31	69
4	North Korea (PRK)	15	13	15	43
5	Thailand (THA)*	11	12	19	42
6	India (IND)	11	11	6	28
7	Indonesia (INA)	8	7	18	33
8	Pakistan (PAK)	4	4	9	17
9	Philippines (PHI)	4	4	6	14
10	Iraq (IRQ)	2	4	6	12
11	Singapore (SIN)	2	1	4	7
12	Malaysia (MAL)	2	1	3	6
13	Mongolia (MGL)	1	3	5	9
14	Lebanon (LIB)	1	1	0	2
15	Syria (SYR)	1	0	0	1
16	Burma (BIR)	0	3	3	6
17	Hong Kong (HKG)	0	2	3	5
18	Sri Lanka (SRI)	0	0	2	2
19	Kuwait (KUW)	0	0	1	1
Totals (19 entries)		201	199	226	626
