= Aduuchiin Baatarkhüü =

Mongolian wrestler (born 1956)

Personal information
- Native name: Адуучийн Баатархүү
- Nationality: Mongolia
- Born: 27 January 1956 (age 70) Khovd, Mongolia
- Height: 1.85 m (6 ft 1 in) (1980)

Sport
- Country: Mongolia
- Sport: Wrestling
- Weight class: 82–130 kg
- Event: Freestyle
Medal record
Representing Mongolia
Men's freestyle wrestling
Asian Games
Silver medal – second place	1978 Bangkok	82 kg
Silver medal – second place	1990 Beijing	130 kg
Asian Championships
Silver medal – second place	1989 Oarai Ibaraki	130 kg
World Junior Championships
Gold medal – first place	1979 Ulaanbaatar	82 kg

Aduuchiin Baatarkhüü (born 27 January 1956) is a Mongolian wrestler. He competed in the 1980 Summer Olympics.
