= South Korea at the 1978 Asian Games =

- IOC code: KOR
- NOC: Korean Olympic Committee

in Bangkok
- Competitors: 203 in 18 sports
- Officials: 64
- Medals Ranked 3rd: Gold 18 Silver 20 Bronze 31 Total 69

Asian Games appearances (overview)
- 1954; 1958; 1962; 1966; 1970; 1974; 1978; 1982; 1986; 1990; 1994; 1998; 2002; 2006; 2010; 2014; 2018; 2022; 2026

South Korea (IOC designation:Korea) participated in the 1978 Asian Games held in Bangkok, Thailand from December 9, 1978, to December 20, 1978.

== Medal summary ==
=== Medal table ===
Sport	Gold	Silver	Bronze	Total
Boxing	5	1	3	9
Cycling	2	2	1	5
Tennis	2	1	0	3
Shooting	1	6	8	15
Fencing	1	1	3	5
Wrestling	1	1	3	5
Bowling	1	1	2	4
Archery	1	1	0	2
Basketball	1	1	0	2
Weightlifting	1	1	0	2
Volleyball	1	0	1	2
Football	1	0	0	1
Gymnastics	0	2	2	4
Table tennis	0	1	4	5
Athletics	0	1	1	2
Swimming	0	0	3	3
Totals (16 entries)	18	20	31	69
