= Iqbal Muhammad =

Pakistani boxer

Iqbal Muhammad is a former boxer from Pakistan who won the gold medal in the light heavyweight category at the 1978 Asian Games in Bangkok.
