= Or Aviram =

Israeli ten-pin bowler

Or Aviram (Hebrew: אור אבירם) is an Israeli ten-pin bowler. He finished runner-up in the 2005 QubicaAMF Bowling World Cup. Eight years later, he would become the first Israeli to win the QubicaAMF Bowling World Cup. He became the first Israeli to win the European Champions Cup, when he won in 2006. This would be the only medal Israel has won in European Champions Cup history.

His sister, Mor Aviram, is also a professional bowler, as was their mother, Sara Aviram.
