= IBF World Cup (bowling) =

Annual ten-pin bowling championship

- Sport: Tenpin bowling
- Founded: 1965
- Singles entrants: 292 (192 men from 48 countries, 100 women from 25 countries)
- Most recent champions: Singles: (Hong Kong) Jovi Ma (Men); Manon Clément (Women); Teams: France (Men); Denmark (Women)
- Sponsor: QubicaAMF Worldwide
- Website: QubicaAMF Bowling World Cup; IBF (International Bowling Federation)

The IBF World Cup, an amateur bowling tournament, follows the QubicaAMF Bowling World Cup and focuses on amateur bowling competitions. It encompasses both individual and team events for men and women. This event is backed by the International Bowling Federation and its sponsor, QubicaAMF. Participants from around the globe, primarily amateurs, are welcomed to compete in these tournaments. As a result of their participation, winners from all competitions for both genders will be recognized on a global scale.

== History ==
The Bowling World Cup was created by AMF's European Promotions Director at the time, Victor Kalman, and Gordon Caie, AMF's Promotions Manager in the UK at the time. Dublin, Ireland in 1965 hosted the first-ever Bowling World Cup, then called the International Masters. 20 bowlers, all men, participated. Lauri Ajanto became the first-ever winner of the BWC. Women first competed in 1972, the 8th edition of the AMF Bowling World Cup in Hamburg, West Germany where Irma Urrea became the first-ever woman to win the BWC.

13 countries had participated in every Bowling World Cup since its inception until 2019: Australia, Belgium, England (as Great Britain from 1965 to 1995), Finland, France, Germany, Ireland, Italy, Mexico, Netherlands, Norway, Switzerland and United States.

From 1965 to 2019, a total of 55 editions have been conducted, beginning with the International Masters, where Lauri Ajanto from Finland emerged victorious in Dublin, Ireland. This event transitioned to the AMF Bowling World Cup in 1969, which was followed by the first women's competition won by Irma Urrea of Mexico during the 8th Bowling World Cup of 1972. In the years that followed, the QubicaAMF Bowling World Cup was rebranded in 2005 and took place in Ljubljana, Slovenia. Ultimately, in 2019, the 55th QubicaAMF Bowling World Cup was hosted in Palembang, Indonesia, where champions Francois Louw from South Africa and Rebecca Whiting from Australia were crowned.

Throughout the extensive history of the Bowling World Cup, significant changes have occurred, leading to the evolution into the IBF World Cup, which encompasses competitions across various disciplines. Meanwhile, the QubicaAMF World Cup Facebook page continues to showcase a wide array of past editions, featuring posts that highlight historic moments whenever available.

Beginning in 2022, the World Cups presented by QubicaAMF will see the best of the best compete for the most prestigious team award in bowling. The format is designed to showcase individual performance and teamwork with skill, endurance, knowledge and strategy as key ingredients to be able to walk as champions.

In the recent year of 2026, the IBF World Cup was hosted in Brunnthal, Munich, Germany.

Currently, the men's champion is Jovi Ma and the women's champion is Manon Clément. The team's champions are France (men) and Denmark (women).

== Format ==
=== 2019 ===
Qualifying Rounds

- Stage 1: Qualifying Round of 24 Games, total pinfall. Top 24 Men, Top 24 Women advance to Stage 2, total pinfall carries over.
- Stage 2: Top 24 Men, Top 24 women bowls 8 games. Top 8 Men, Top 8 Women based on total pinfall after 32 games advance to Stage 3.
- Stage 3: Top 8 Men, Top 8 women bowls another 8 games in a round robin format, 30 bonus pins for a win, 15 bonus pins for a tie. Top 4 Men, Top 4 Women after 40 games (total pinfall + bonus pins) advance to the knockout finals.

Knockout Finals

- Semifinals: First seeded bowler vs Fourth seeded bowler; Second seeded bowler vs Third seeded bowler, winners (Men and women) advance to the finals.
- Finals: Semifinal winners bowl for the title. (Men and women)

Lane Pattern

- For the 2019 BWC, all games are bowled on one pattern, typically a 41-foot pattern unless lane topography at the host site dictates that the pattern be adjusted one foot less or one foot more.

=== 2022–present ===
Singles Format

- Round 1 (Individual Round-Robin): Bowlers compete individually in groups/pools, earning 3 points for a win and 1 point for a tie to form an overall leaderboard. Ties to advance to Round 2, will be broken by a one game roll off between the tied bowlers.
- Advancement: The top qualifiers from each pool, the top two (Men) and the top four (Women), advance to the knockout bracket (Top 32).
- Knockout Brackets: Singles move through the Top 32, Last 16, quarterfinals, and semi-finals (with bronze matches for losers) to the Final.

Team Format

- Round 1 / Group Stage: Teams compete in group round-robin matches using the Baker format (best of 3), earning 3 points per victory. Ties to advance to Round 2, will be broken by a one game roll off between the teams.
- Advancement: Top teams from each group advance to the elimination bracket (Last 16).
- Knockout Brackets: Last 16 advance through quarterfinals and semi-finals to the final.
- Finals & Tiebreakers: The final matches are best of 5 (Baker format), and any ties utilize 9th/10th frame roll-offs.

Lane Pattern

- For the 2026 IBF World Cup, all games (singles and teams) were bowled on a 44-foot pattern.

== Previous winners ==
=== Singles ===
Year	Location	Men	Women
1965	(Republic of Ireland) Dublin, Ireland	(Finland) Lauri Ajanto	Women did not participate from 1965 to 1971
1966	London, England	(United States) John Wilcox	Women did not participate from 1965 to 1971
1967	Paris, France	(United States) Jack Connaughton	Women did not participate from 1965 to 1971
1968	Guadalajara, Mexico	(West Germany) Fritz Blum	Women did not participate from 1965 to 1971
1969	Tokyo, Japan	(Canada) Graydon Robinson	Women did not participate from 1965 to 1971
1970	Copenhagen, Denmark	(West Germany) Klaus Müller	Women did not participate from 1965 to 1971
1971	Hong Kong	(United States) Roger Dalkin	Women did not participate from 1965 to 1971
1972	Hamburg, West Germany	(Canada) Ray Mitchell	(Mexico) Irma Urrea
1973	Singapore	(United Kingdom) Bernie Caterer	(Thailand) Kesinee Srivises
1974	Caracas, Venezuela	(Colombia) Jairo Ocampo	(Denmark) Birgitte Lund
1975	Makati, Philippines	(Italy) Lorenzo Monti	(Canada) Cathy Townsend
1976	Tehran, Iran	(Philippines) Paeng Nepomuceno	(United States) Lucy Giovinco
1977	Tolworth, England	(Norway) Arne Svein Ström	(Canada) Rea Rennox
1978	Bogotá, Colombia	(Thailand) Samran Banyen	(Philippines) Lita dela Rosa
1979	Bangkok, Thailand	(France) Philippe Dubois	(Philippines) Bong Coo
1980	Jakarta, Indonesia	(Philippines) Paeng Nepomuceno	(Canada) Jean Gordon
1981	New York City, United States	(United States) Bob Worrall	(United Kingdom) Pauline Smith
1982	Scheveningen, Netherlands	(Norway) Arne Svein Ström	(Australia) Jeanette Baker
1983	Mexico City, Mexico	(Chinese Taipei) Chu You-tien	(Australia) Jeanette Baker
1984	Sydney, Australia	(United States) Jack Jurek	(Italy) Eliana Rigato
1985	Seoul, South Korea	(Mexico) Alfonso Rodríguez	(Republic of Ireland) Marjorie McEntee
1986	Copenhagen, Denmark	(Sweden) Peter Ljung	(Sweden) Annette Hagre
1987	Kuala Lumpur, Malaysia	(Italy) Remo Fornasari	(Netherlands) Irene Gronert
1988	Guadalajara, Mexico	(United Arab Emirates) Mohammed Khalifa Al-Qubaisi	(United States) Linda Kelly
1989	(Republic of Ireland) Dublin, Ireland	(Qatar) Salem Al-Monsuri	(United States) Patty Ann
1990	Pattaya, Thailand	(Finland) Tom Hahl	(United States) Linda Graham
1991	Beijing, China	(United States) Jon Juneau	(Sweden) Åsa Larsson
1992	Le Mans, France	(Philippines) Paeng Nepomuceno	(Germany) Martina Beckel
1993	Johannesburg, South Africa	(Germany) Rainer Puisis	(United Kingdom) Pauline Smith
1994	Hermosillo, Mexico	(Norway) Tore Torgersen	(South Africa) Anne Jacobs
1995	São Paulo, Brazil	(United States) Patrick Healey Jr.	(United Kingdom) Gemma Burden
1996	Belfast, Northern Ireland	(Philippines) Paeng Nepomuceno	(Australia) Cara Honeychurch
1997	Cairo, Egypt	(Germany) Christian Nokel	(Chinese Taipei) Tseng Su-fen
1998	Kobe, Japan	(Chinese Taipei) Yang Cheng-ming	(Australia) Maxine Nable
1999	Las Vegas, United States	(Qatar) Ahmed Shaheen	(Australia) Amanda Bradley
2000	Lisbon, Portugal	(Sweden) Tomas Leandersson	(Wales) Mel Isaac
2001	Pattaya, Thailand	(Norway) Kim Haugen	(Japan) Nachimi Itakura
2002	Riga, Latvia	(Finland) Mika Luoto	(United States) Shannon Pluhowsky
2003	Tegucigalpa, Honduras	(Philippines) Christian Jan Suarez	(Canada) Kerrie Ryan-Ciach
2004	Singapore	(Finland) Kai Virtanen	(United States) Shannon Pluhowsky
2005	Ljubljana, Slovenia	(Canada) Michael Schmidt	(United States) Lynda Barnes
2006	Caracas, Venezuela	(Finland) Osku Palermaa	(United States) Diandra Asbaty
2007	Saint Petersburg, Russia	(United States) Bill Hoffman	(Australia) Ann-Maree Putney
2008	Hermosillo, Mexico	(United States) Derek Eoff	(Singapore) Jasmine Yeong-Nathan
2009	Malacca Town, Malaysia	(South Korea) Choi Yong-kyu	(Canada) Caroline Lagrange
2010	Toulon, France	(Canada) Michael Schmidt	(Dominican Republic) Aumi Guerra
2011	Johannesburg, South Africa	(Australia) Jason Belmonte	(Dominican Republic) Aumi Guerra
2012	Wrocław, Poland	(Malaysia) Syafiq Ridhwan	(Singapore) Shayna Ng
2013	Krasnoyarsk, Russia	(Israel) Or Aviram	(Canada) Caroline Lagrange
2014	Wrocław, Poland	(United States) Chris Barnes	(Colombia) Clara Guerrero
2015	Las Vegas, United States	(Hong Kong) Wu Siu Hong	(Colombia) Clara Guerrero
2016	Shanghai, China	(China) Wang Hongbo	(Sweden) Jenny Wegner
2017	Hermosillo, Mexico	(United States) Jakob Butturff	(Philippines) Krizziah Tabora
2018	Las Vegas, United States	(Australia) Sam Cooley	(United States) Shannon O'Keefe
2019	Palembang, Indonesia	(South Africa) Francois Louw	(Australia) Rebecca Whiting
2021	No Tournament Held		
2022	Sunshine Coast, Australia	(Germany) Paul Purps	(United States) Bryanna Coté
2023	No Tournament Held		
2024	No Tournament Held		
2025	Kowloon, Hong Kong	(China) Du Jianchao	(Malaysia) Natasha Roslan
2026	Munich, Germany	(Hong Kong) Jovi Ma	(France) Manon Clément

==== Number of titles by country/territory ====
Men
Country/Territory	Titles	Years
United States	11	1966, 1967, 1971, 1981, 1984, 1991, 1995, 2007, 2008, 2014, 2017
Germany	5	1968, (Note: As West Germany.) 1970, 1993, 1997, 2022
Finland	5	1965, 1990, 2002, 2004, 2006
Philippines	5	1976, 1980, 1992, 1996, 2003
Canada	4	1969, 1972, 2005, 2010
Norway	4	1977, 1982, 1994, 2001
Hong Kong	2	2015, 2026
China	2	2016, 2025
Australia	2	2011, 2018
Sweden	2	1986, 2000
Qatar	2	1989, 1999
Chinese Taipei	2	1983, 1998
Italy	2	1975, 1987
South Africa	1	2019
Israel	1	2013
Malaysia	1	2012
South Korea	1	2009
United Arab Emirates	1	1988
Mexico	1	1985
France	1	1979
Thailand	1	1978
Colombia	1	1974
Great Britain	1	1973

Women
Country/Territory	Titles	Years
United States	10	1976, 1988, 1989, 1990, 2002, 2004, 2005, 2006, 2018, 2022
Australia	7	1982, 1983, 1996, 1998, 1999, 2007, 2019
Canada	6	1975, 1977, 1980, 2003, 2009, 2013
Singapore	4	2008, 2012
Philippines	3	1978, 1979, 2017
Sweden	3	1986, 1991, 2016
Great Britain	3	1981, 1993, 1995
Colombia	2	2014, 2015
Dominican Republic	2	2010, 2011
France	1	2026
Malaysia	1	2025
Japan	1	2001
Wales	1	2000
Chinese Taipei	1	1997
South Africa	1	1994
Germany	1	1992
Netherlands	1	1987
Ireland	1	1985
Italy	1	1984
Denmark	1	1974
Thailand	1	1973
Mexico	1	1972

=== Team ===
Year	Location	Men	Women
2022	Sunshine Coast, Australia	United States	Sweden
2025	Kowloon, Hong Kong	Malaysia	United States
2026	Munich, Germany	France	Denmark

==== Number of titles by country/territory ====
Men
Country/Territory	Titles	Years
United States	1	2022
Malaysia	1	2025
France	1	2026

Women
Country/Territory	Titles	Years
Sweden	1	2022
United States	1	2025
Denmark	1	2026

== Records ==
=== Winners ===
- (Philippines) Paeng Nepomuceno holds two Guinness World Records from his victories in the Bowling World Cup. His four victories (1976, 1980, 1992, 1996) came in a record three different decades. He also holds the record for the youngest men's champion, 19, when he won his first of four titles in 1976. Incidentally, Nepomuceno won his titles in Olympic years.
- The oldest champions are (Italy) Remo Fornasari, 51, when he won in 1987; and (Mexico) Irma Urrea, 45, when she won the very first women's title in 1972.
- (United Kingdom) Gemma Burden holds a Guinness World Record as the youngest Bowling World Cup Champion, 17, when she won in 1995.
- Two other men besides Nepomuceno has won multiple Bowling World Cup titles, (Norway) Arne Svein Ström (1977 and 1982) and (Canada) Michael Schmidt (2005 and 2010).
- Six women have each won two times, (United Kingdom) Pauline Smith (1981 and 1993), (Australia) Jeanette Baker (1982 and 1983), (United States) Shannon Pluhowsky (2002 and 2004), (Dominican Republic) Aumi Guerra (2010 and 2011), (Canada) Caroline Lagrange (2009 and 2013) and (Colombia) Clara Guerrero (2014 and 2015).
- Baker, Guerra, and Guerrero are the only bowlers in Bowling World Cup history to win consecutive titles.
- Only once has a country swept the men's and women's titles in the same year. This occurred in 1986 when Sweden incidentally defeated Philippines in both the men's and women's finals.
- A host representative has won the Bowling World Cup three times. (United States) Bob Worrall won in New York City in 1981, (China) Wang Hongbo won in Shanghai in 2016, and (United States) Shannon O'Keefe won in Las Vegas in 2018.
- Chris Barnes (2014 men's champion) and Lynda Barnes (2005 women's champion) is the only husband-wife duo to win the Bowling World Cup.
- United States is the most successful nation in the Bowling World Cup, winning a combined 21 titles (11 men's titles, 10 women's titles)

=== Scoring ===
Category	Record	Player	Year/Venue
Qualifying Rounds (Note: Qualifying rounds consists of three or four days of qualifying, eight games in the Top 24 round, and round-robin match play.)
Men's Individual Game	300	59 300s have been bowled in the qualifying rounds. (Note: Jason Belmonte and Tore Torgersen has bowled the most 300s, each with three. In 2013, Torgersen became the first in QubicaAMF Bowling World Cup history to bowl consecutive 300s.)	
Women's Individual Game	300	15 300s have been bowled in the qualifying rounds. (Note: No women has bowled multiple 300s as of 2019.)	
Men's 3 Game Series	896	(Australia) Paul Trotter	2002, Riga, Latvia
Women's 3 Game Series	803	(Dominican Republic) Aumi Guerra (Note: Qualifying Day 2: Games 6, 7, 8: 244, 280, 279)	2011, Johannesburg, South Africa
Men's 5 Game Block	1307	(Qatar) Ahmed Shaheen	2002, Riga, Latvia
Women's 5 Game Block	1304	(Dominican Republic) Aumi Guerra	2011, Johannesburg, South Africa
Men's 6 Game Block	1599	(Belgium) Mats Maggi	2013, Krasnoyarsk, Russia
Women's 6 Game Block	1531	(United States) Lynda Barnes	2005, Ljubljana, Slovenia
Men's 8 Game Block	2088	(United States) Tommy Jones	2011, Johannesburg, South Africa
Women's 8 Game Block	1948	(Colombia) Clara Guerrero	2014, Wrocław, Poland
Men's High Average (Note: 32 Games)	246.22	(Finland) Osku Palermaa	2006, Caracas, Venezuela
Women's High Average	244.03	(Canada) Caroline Lagrange	2013, Krasnoyarsk, Russia
Finals – Arena "Knockout" Rounds (2000–2005), (2016–) (Note: From 2000 to 2005, Arena Knockout Rounds was a format of three rounds of single elimination, best-of-three-games. From 2016 till present, Arena Knockout rounds is a format of two rounds of single elimination, one game matches.) and Stepladder
Men's Individual Game	300	(Finland) Kai Virtanen	2004, Singapore
Men's Individual Game	300	(United States) Chris Barnes	2014, Wrocław, Poland
Women's Individual Game	298	(Singapore) Jasmine Yeong-Nathan	2008, Hermosillo, Mexico
Men's 2 Game Series	536	(Norway) Petter Hansen	2004, Singapore
Women's 2 Game Series	561	(Singapore) Jasmine Yeong-Nathan	2008, Hermosillo, Mexico
Men's 3 Game Series	778	(United States) Derek Eoff	2008, Hermosillo, Mexico
Women's 3 Game Series	747	(Colombia) Clara Guerrero	2014, Wrocław, Poland

=== Appearances and Participation ===
- Most Appearances, Men – 16, (Philippines) Paeng Nepomuceno

1976, 1979–1980, 1982, 1985–1989, 1991–1996, 2009

- Most Appearances, Women – 17, (El Salvador) Aida Granillo

1982–1983, 1985, 1988, 1992, 1994–1996, 1998–2000, 2002–2006, 2008

- (Netherlands) Erik Kok has participated in the Bowling World Cup in five different decades.

1979–1980, 1985, 1989, 1995, 2005, 2014

- Most Championship Appearances, Stepladder and Arena, Men – 9, (Philippines) Paeng Nepomuceno

1976, 1980, 1986, 1989, 1991–1993, 1995–1996

- Most Championship Appearances, Stepladder and Arena, Women – 7, (Malaysia) Shalin Zulkifli

1996–1998, 2000–2001, 2003–2004

- Most Countries – 95 in 2004
- Most Bowlers, Men and Women Combined – 167 in 2010
- Most Bowlers, Men – 93 in 2004
- Most Bowlers, Women – 76 in 2010

== Awards ==
- The Bent Petersen Country Award is awarded to the country with the best combined finishes in the men's and women's divisions. It is named after Bent Petersen, who ran AMF's international operations for 36 years before retiring in 1998. Originally known as the Country Champion Award, it has been awarded at the BWC since 1984. The first winner of the award was Thailand. Australia are the most recent winners. In 2000, the award was renamed in honor of Petersen. Petersen died on November 21, 2014.
- Highest Game Award is awarded in both the men's and women's division to the bowlers who had the highest one game score during the tournament. There have been 76 300s bowled at the QubicaAMF Bowling World Cup (61 by men, 15 by women). (Canada) Jack Guay bowled the first-ever 300 game in 1994, the 30th year of the AMF Bowling World Cup; while (Malaysia) Shalin Zulkifli was the first woman to bowl a 300 in 1997. United States has the most 300s by a country, seven.
- The Barry James Sportsman Award and Jacky Felsenstein Sportswoman Award, awarded to one male bowler and one female bowler, is voted for by the participating bowlers. Representatives from Canada and Mexico have each won this award more times than any country, seven times each.
