= Lita dela Rosa =

Filipino ten-pin bowler

Sport
- Country: Philippines
- Sport: Bowling

Achievements and titles
- World finals: 1978 Bowling World Cup: Champion
Medal record
Representing Philippines
Women's Bowling
Event	1st	2nd	3rd
World Bowling Championships	3	2	1
Asian Games	1	1	–
Asian Championships	1	–	–
Southeast Asian Games	4	1	1
Total	9	4	2
World Tenpin Bowling Championships
Gold medal – first place	1979 Manila	Singles
Gold medal – first place	1979 Manila	Doubles
Gold medal – first place	1979 Manila	Masters
Silver medal – second place	1979 Manila	Trios
Bronze medal – third place	1979 Manila	All Events
Silver medal – second place	1983 Caracas	Trios
Asian Games
Gold medal – first place	1978 Bangkok	Team
Silver medal – second place	1978 Bangkok	Trios
Asian Championships
Gold medal – first place	1978 Bangkok	Doubles
Gold medal – first place	1984 Singapore	Doubles
Southeast Asian Games
Gold medal – first place	Manila 1981	Doubles
Gold medal – first place	Manila 1981	Trios
Silver medal – second place	Manila 1981	Team
Gold medal – first place	Singapore 1983	Team
Bronze medal – third place	Singapore 1983	Doubles
Gold medal – first place	Bangkok 1985	Team

Lita dela Rosa (died July 1994) was a Filipino 4-time World champion in Tenpin Bowling from Cebu, Philippines. She was posthumously inducted in the World Bowling Hall of Fame and in the Philippine Sports Hall of Fame in 2018.

== Career ==
=== World tournaments ===
Lita won the AMF Bowling World Cup in Bogota, Colombia, in 1978. In 1979 IX Fédération Internationale des Quilleurs World Championship that was held in Manila, Philippines (at the Celebrity Sports Plaza), she won the gold medal in Women Single, as well as the prestigious Masters title. She won another gold medal in Women Doubles teamed up with country woman Bong Coo, and added another silver medal in Trios with Coo and Nellie Castillo.

Dela Rosa is only one of two women who have won the AMF Bowling World Cup and the FIQ/WTBA Masters in successive years (the other is Annette Hagre Johansson of Sweden (1986 AMF Bowling World Cup, 1987 FIQ/WTBA Masters)).

In the following world championships in 1983 X Fédération Internationale des Quilleurs held in Caracas Venezuela, Lita, Bong Coo and Arianne Cerdeña took another crack at the Trios but tied with the United States team for the silver medal.

Dela Rosa is a recipient of government incentives as a past achiever per R.A. 9064 through the Philippine Sports Commission.

=== Asian tournaments ===
In the 1979 5th FIQ Asian Zone Championships at Ploenshit Bowling Center in Bangkok, Lita combined with Nellie Castillo for the Women Doubles Gold medal.

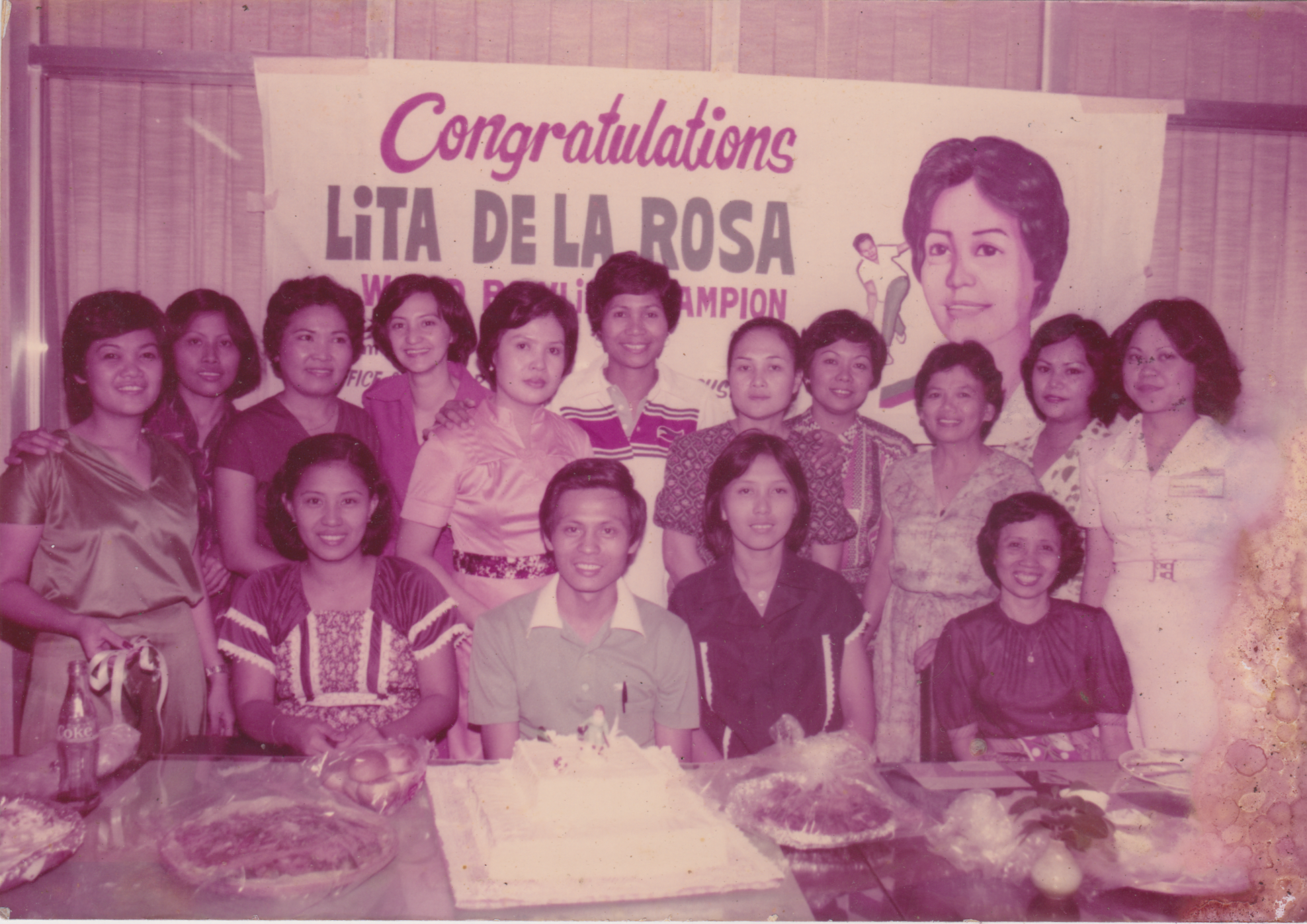
Welcome party to Lita (top center) at the GSIS office

== International and National Hall of Fame ==
She was posthumously elected to the WBW International Bowling Hall of Fame in 2000 and posthumously inducted in the Philippine Sports Hall of Fame with compatriots Rafael "Paeng" Nepomuceno and Olivia "Bong" Coo on October 12, 2019.

== Duckpin ==
Dela Rosa was also one of the best duckpin bowlers in the Philippines, also having won the silver medal at the World Cup of Duckpin.

== Death ==
She died in July 1994, at the age of 57, following a heart bypass operation. She was honored by the Government Service Insurance System (GSIS) for faithfully serving it for 32 years. She retired in April 1994 with the rank of Technical Assistant in the GSIS Manpower Development Division.
