= Khastyn Jamgan =

Mongolian boxer (born 1950)

Personal information
- Nationality: Mongolian
- Born: 15 October 1950 (age 74)

Sport
- Sport: Boxing

Khastyn Jamgan (Mongolian: Хастын Жамган; born 15 October 1950) is a Mongolian boxer. He competed in the men's light welterweight event at the 1980 Summer Olympics.
