= Thailand at the 1978 Asian Games =

- IOC code: THA
- NOC: National Olympic Committee of Thailand
- Website: www.olympicthai.or.th/eng (in English and Thai)

in Bangkok
- Medals Ranked 5th: Gold 11 Silver 11 Bronze 20 Total 42

Asian Games appearances (overview)
- 1951; 1954; 1958; 1962; 1966; 1970; 1974; 1978; 1982; 1986; 1990; 1994; 1998; 2002; 2006; 2010; 2014; 2018; 2022; 2026

Thailand was the host nation for the 1978 Asian Games in Bangkok on 9–20 December 1978. Thailand ended the games at 42 overall medals including 11 gold medals.
