= Japan at the 1978 Asian Games =

- IOC code: JPN
- NOC: Japanese Olympic Committee

in Bangkok
- Competitors: 306 in 19 sports
- Flag bearer: Yuji Takada
- Medals Ranked 1st: Gold 70 Silver 58 Bronze 49 Total 177

Asian Games appearances (overview)
- 1951; 1954; 1958; 1962; 1966; 1970; 1974; 1978; 1982; 1986; 1990; 1994; 1998; 2002; 2006; 2010; 2014; 2018; 2022; 2026

Japan participated in the 1978 Asian Games held in Bangkok, Thailand from December 9, 1978 to December 20, 1978. This country was ranked 1st with 70 gold medals, 58 silver medals and 49 bronze medals with a total of 177 medals to secure its top spot in the medal tally. It was the last time that Japan topped the Asian Games medal table.
