= 1978 Asian Games =

Multi-sport event in Bangkok, Thailand

VIII Asian Games
- Host city: Bangkok, Thailand
- Nations: 25
- Athletes: 3,842
- Events: 199 in 19 sports
- Opening: 9 December 1978
- Closing: 20 December 1978
- Opened by: Bhumibol Adulyadej; King of Thailand
- Athlete's Oath: Preeda Chullamondhol
- Torch lighter: Panomkorn Pladchurnil; Ratchaneewan Bulakul
- Main venue: National Stadium
- Website: ocasia.org (archived)

The 8th Asian Games (Thai: กีฬาเอเชียนเกมส์ครั้งที่ 8), also known as Bangkok 1978 (Thai: กรุงเทพมหานคร 1978), were held from 9 to 20 December 1978, in Bangkok, Thailand. Originally, the host city was Singapore but Singapore dropped its plan to host the Games due to financial problems. Then Islamabad, the capital of Pakistan, was decided to host the 8th Games. But Islamabad also dropped its plan to host the Asian Games due to conflicts with Bangladesh and India. The Imperial State of Iran withdrew because of the Iranian revolution.

Thailand offered to help and the Asiad therefore was held in Bangkok. On the political front, Israel was expelled from the Asian Games. A total number of 3,842 athletes, coming from 25 countries, competed in these Asian Games. Debuting sports were archery and bowling.

== Sports ==
- Archery (4)
- Athletics (39)
- Badminton (7)
- Basketball (2)
- Bowling (10)
- Boxing (11)
- Cycling (6)
- Diving (4)
- Fencing (8)
- Field hockey (1)
- Football (1)
- Gymnastics (14)
- Sailing (4)
- Shooting (22)
- Swimming (29)
- Table tennis (7)
- Tennis (7)
- Volleyball (2)
- Water polo (1)
- Weightlifting (10)
- Wrestling (10)

== Participating nations ==
25 out of 32 Olympic Council of Asia members participated in these games. Iran sent only one official and did not participate in the games due to the political situation in Iran at the time. Democratic Kampuchea also did not send any athletes and were represented by two officials.

- Bahrain (45)
- Bangladesh (39)
- Burma (42)
- China (408)
- Hong Kong (112)
- India (283)
- Indonesia (104)
- Iraq (17)
- Japan (460)
- Kuwait (27)
- Lebanon (3)
- Malaysia (107)
- Mongolia (20)
- Nepal (13)
- North Korea (111)
- Pakistan (82)
- Philippines (316)
- Qatar (23)
- Saudi Arabia (103)
- Singapore (76)
- South Korea (253)
- Sri Lanka (18)
- Syria (40)
- Thailand (948)
- United Arab Emirates (192)

Number of athletes by National Olympic Committees (by highest to lowest)

IOC Letter Code	Country	Athletes
THA	Thailand	948
JPN	Japan	460
CHN	China	408
PHI	Philippines	316
IND	India	283
KOR	South Korea	253
UAE	United Arab Emirates	192
HKG	Hong Kong	112
PRK	North Korea	111
MAL	Malaysia	107
INA	Indonesia	104
KSA	Saudi Arabia	103
PAK	Pakistan	82
SIN	Singapore	76
BRN	Bahrain	45
BIR	Burma	42
SYR	Syria	40
BAN	Bangladesh	39
KUW	Kuwait	27
QAT	Qatar	23
MGL	Mongolia	20
SRI	Sri Lanka	18
IRQ	Iraq	17
NEP	Nepal	13
LIB	Lebanon	3

== Medal table ==
The top ten ranked NOCs at these Games are listed below. The host nation, Thailand, is highlighted.

* Host nation (Thailand)

Rank	Nation	Gold	Silver	Bronze	Total
1	Japan (JPN)	70	59	49	178
2	China (CHN)	51	54	46	151
3	South Korea (KOR)	18	20	31	69
4	North Korea (PRK)	15	13	15	43
5	Thailand (THA)*	11	12	19	42
6	India (IND)	11	11	6	28
7	Indonesia (INA)	8	7	18	33
8	Pakistan (PAK)	4	4	9	17
9	Philippines (PHI)	4	4	6	14
10	Iraq (IRQ)	2	4	6	12
11–19	Remaining	7	11	21	39
Totals (19 entries)		201	199	226	626

Preceded by Tehran	Asian Games; Bangkok; VIII Asiad (1978)	Succeeded by New Delhi
