= Pinsetter =

Machine used to set bowling pins

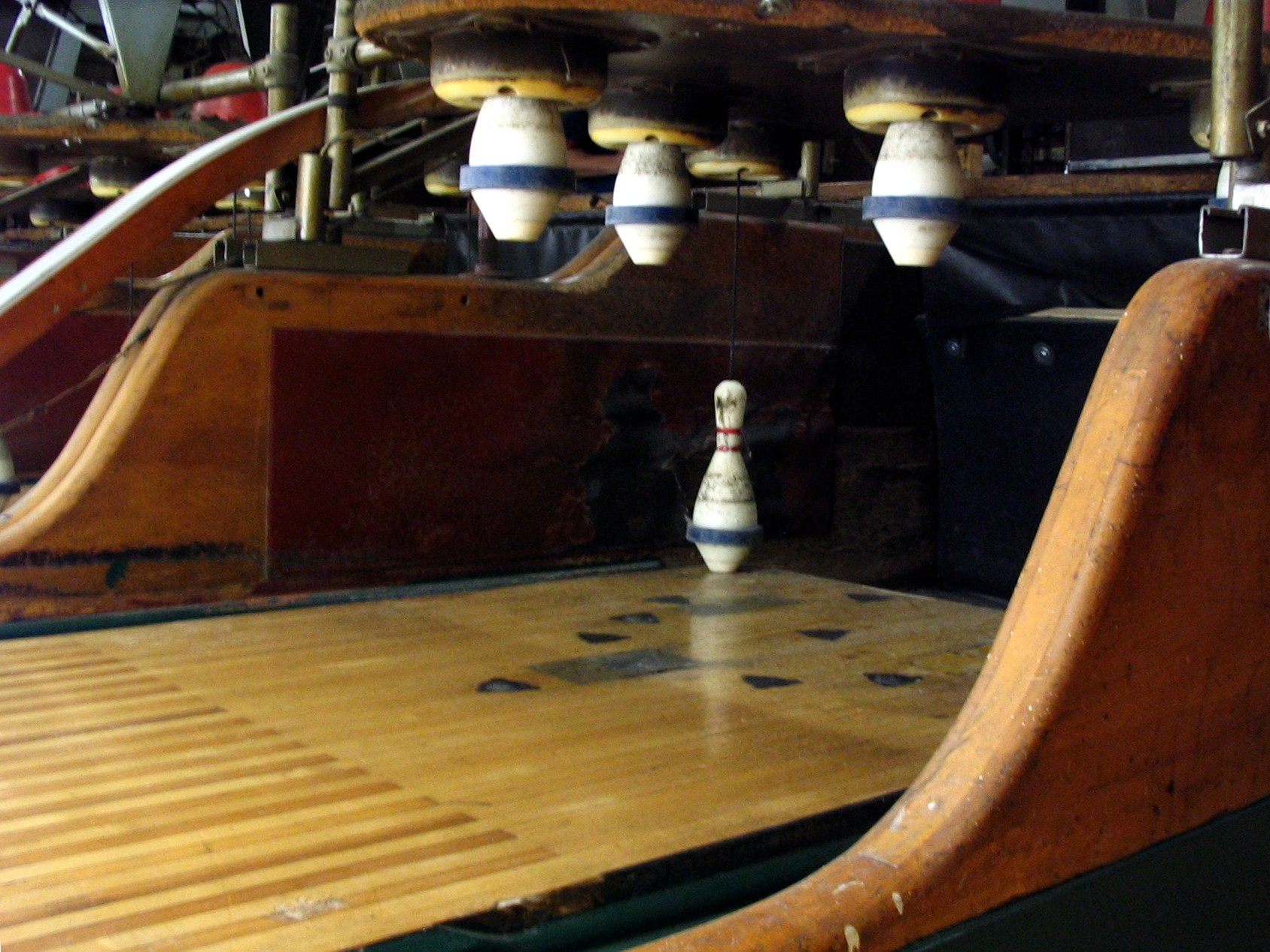
A 5-pin bowling pinsetter in use at a bowling alley in Toronto

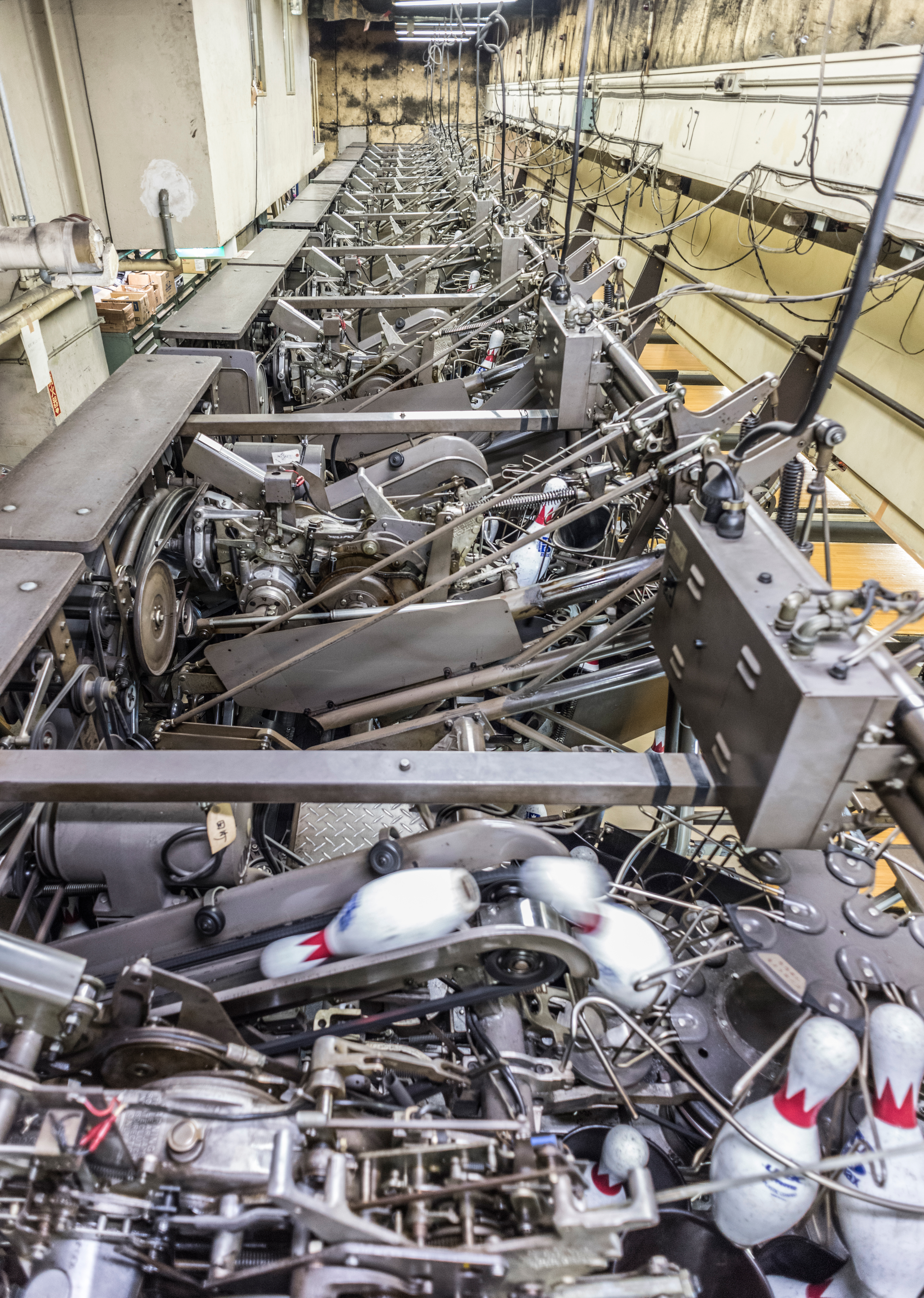
Brunswick A-2 Pinsetters in operation at a bowling alley as seen from behind the lanes

In bowling, a pinsetter (Brunswick) or pinspotter (AMF) is an automated mechanical device that sets bowling pins back in their original positions, returns bowling balls to the front of the alley, and clears fallen pins on the pin deck. Prior to the machine's invention, pinsetters were boys or young men (pin boys) hired at bowling alleys to manually reset pins and return balls to the player. The first mechanical pinsetter was invented by Gottfried (Fred) Schmidt, who sold the patent (U.S. patent 2,208,605) in 1941 to AMF. Pinsetting machines have largely done away with pinsetting as a manual profession, although a small number of bowling alleys still use human pinsetters. While humans usually no longer set the pins, a pinchaser (or "pin monkey") is often stationed near the equipment to ensure it is clean and working properly, and to clear minor jams.

Beginning in the 1970s, modern pinsetters were integrated with electronic scoring systems of varying sophistication. Many pinsetters have a manual reset button in case they do not automatically activate after a ball is rolled. Others have no automatic tracking of the state of the game, especially in candlepin and duckpin bowling sports, which use smaller balls, and in which the machines are manually activated.

== Common terms and design features ==
The designs of automatic pinsetters vary depending on each company's hardware implementations, and on a particular bowling sport's rules and specifications. Bowling-game variants may use different sizes, shapes, and weights of pins and balls, requiring equipment specifically made to handle them.

Part descriptions common to nearly all pinspotting units include:

- Sweep bar – removes fallen and leftover pins from the pin deck. It may also stay lowered throughout the pinsetter operating cycle, to act as the primary physical protective barrier against improperly thrown balls. The sweep bar is activated by ball movement when it enters the pit, usually via an optical sensor.
- Table (also used in pre-automated manual units, often as their sole mechanical device) – places the pins onto the lane for the next frame, then lifts the remaining pins for the sweep bar to remove fallen pins for the bowler's next roll.
- Deck (Brunswick A series only) – a fixed sheet-metal enclosure, usually fastened to the spotting table's framework and diagonal forward frame edges, that provides secondary protection (in addition to the sweep bar) for the spotting table system from improperly thrown balls and flying pins, and covers the pin chutes used to transfer the pins from the characteristic, cage-like Brunswick-design rotating pin storage turret above the table downwards into the deck for transfer onto the pin deck.
- Pit – a collection area behind the lane where balls and struck pins collect for sorting.
- Pin elevator – brings pins upwards out of the lane's pit to the top of the unit for re-setting for subsequent frames to deliver pins upwards from the pit into the pin storage system. In ten-pin units, it is usually in the form of a vertically oriented toroid-shaped system at the extreme rear of the pinspotter.
- A pin storage system that receives fallen pins from the pin elevator system, and stores them to be used as the next full rack of pins. It may be within or part of the table, or above and/or behind the table.
- Ball return – removes the bowler's ball from the lane's pit and returns it to the bowler via the ball return track, located between paired lane beds, back to the ball return unit at the heads of the lanes. The ball lift is designed to separate the ball from the fallen pins in the pit, and does not send pins into the ball return track. The track is normally below the lane, although earlier pinsetters (both mechanical and automatic) have above-lane tracks similar to those of older manual lanes. Above-lane ball returns remain used today as a low-cost alternative for miniature arcade bowling lanes, which use scaled-down balls and pins.
- Pin turret (Brunswick A series only) - a form of pin storage used by Brunswick's Model A-series ten-pin pinspotters (A/A2/JetBack) and emulated in part by some other manufacturers.
- Scoring sensor - Sensors that detect standing pins and sends it as scoring information to the scoring system. A scoring sensor may be integrated into the pinsetter mechanism itself, or using a small camera that captures the image of standing pins.

== Early designs ==
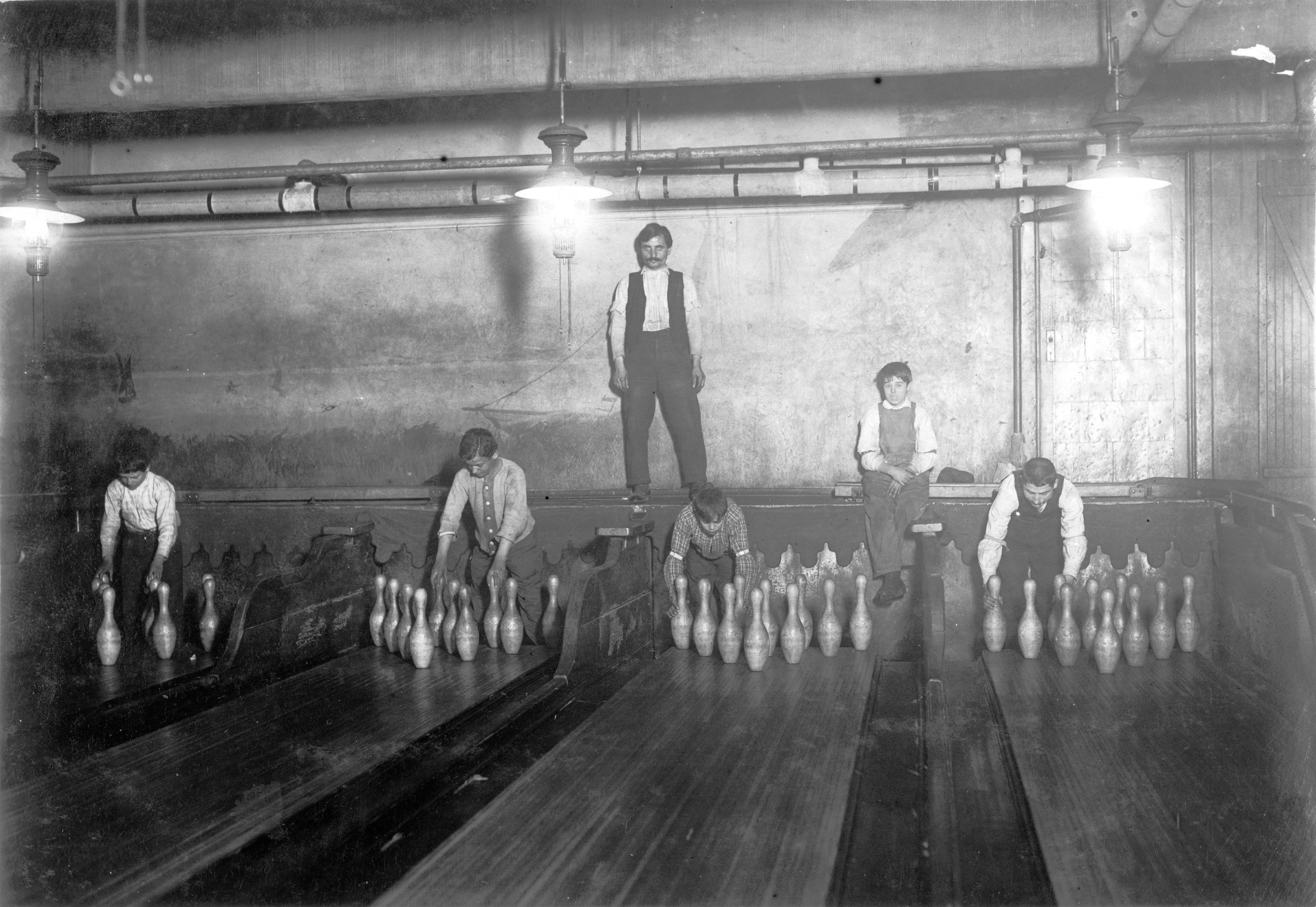
April 1910, 1:00 A.M.: Pin boys working in Subway Bowling Alleys, 65 South St., Brooklyn, New York. Lewis Hine photo.

In the mid-1800s, various alternatives to free-standing pins received U.S. patents to solve perceived problems in pinsetting and ball return, aiming to avoid the need for human pinsetters. One scheme (1851) involved pins with spherical bases that, when hit by a ball, merely fell over in place, then were rotated back to a vertical position. A second arrangement (1853) involved resetting the pins via cords descending from respective pin bottoms to weights beneath the pin deck. Another design (1869) involved suspending the pins with overhead cords.

In the decades preceding the introduction of fully automatic units, semi-automatic pinsetters such as the Brunswick B-1 and B-10, with a manually filled "table" similar to those of fully automatic units and operating much the same as the later units, were used by human pinsetters to speed up manual operation and assure accurate spotting. The oldest operational bowling facility in the United States, Milwaukee, Wisconsin's Holler House, which opened in September 1908, is one of the few remaining all-manually operated alleys that still uses Brunswick "table-style" manual units.

== Ten-pin pinsetters ==
=== AMF pinspotters ===
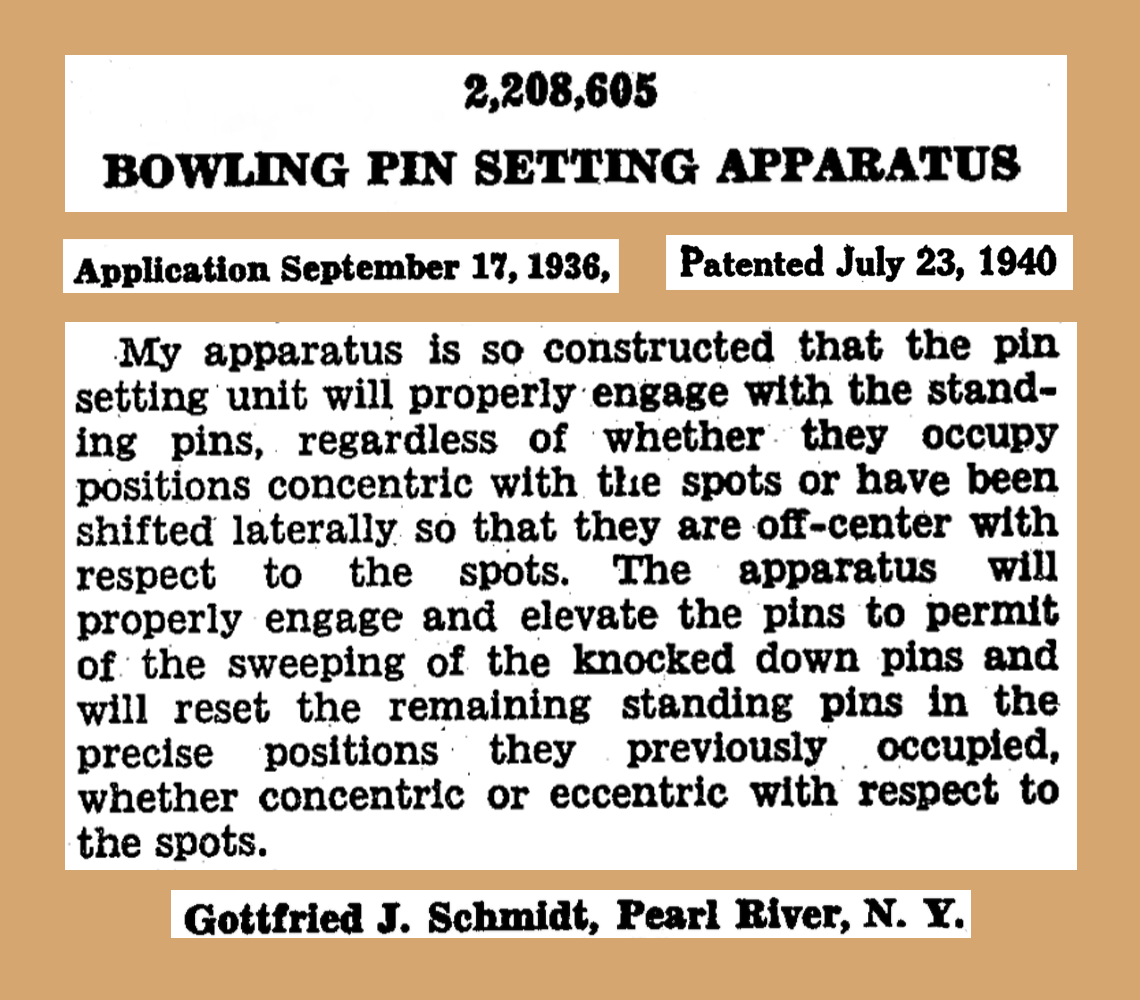
A description from a patent issued to Gottfried J. Schmidt in 1940 from a patent application filed in 1936, focusing on resetting pins that are off-spot

The AMF family of pinspotters, first marketed in 1952 are the first used in quantity in the industry. They have changed little since the mass-produced 82-30 version. There are three main pinspotter models: the aforementioned 82-30 (no longer produced, but still in common use, ever since the 1960s US bowling boom and the early career of Dick Weber); the 82-70 (prototyped in 1962, and still in production, since 1963); and the newest versions, the 82-90 and the 82-90XLI, both of which use the 82-70's general mechanical design. AMF pinspotters were originated by American Machine and Foundry and are now manufactured by QubicaAMF Worldwide. All operate generally the same way, with small improvements.

The 82-30's operation and mechanics, having been significantly developed from AMF's pioneering 82-10 experimental model, which depended much on the use of suction to hold the pins in a double-sided spotting table for both spotting remaining pins and setup of new racks of pins, are quite different from the Model A, A-2 and JetBack units from Brunswick (which the AMF 82-10 pre-dated by almost a decade), with differing sweep and table designs, and especially in how the pins are handled for storage, after they got to the top of the machinery. After the bowler rolls their ball, and knocking down the pins, the ball strikes the pit cushion block. This activates the machine, which lowers the sweep to the guard position. Then the table descends and the respot cells close around each neck of the standing pins. The cells that have pins in them complete electrical circuits that send scoring information to the display, and turned on one or more of ten "pindicator" lights – pioneered by AMF in May 1953 – in an electrically illuminated triangular framed screen on the pinspotter's masking unit in front of the machine, to identify remaining pins.

After the table lifts the remaining pins, the machine runs the sweep, clearing dead pins from the pin deck, then returns to the guard position. Ball and pins travel on a continuously running carpet belt at the bottom of the pit. The ball, being heavier, travels to one of the side kick-backs where it enters the ball return, shared by adjacent lanes. The pins travel under the cushion into the ring-shaped, revolving circular pin elevator, at the rear center of the unit, which brings the pins up to a "distributor arm" that travels laterally as well as forward and back (on the 82-30, an "arrowhead"-planform guide rail atop the spotting table governs the distributor's head piece movements) over the table to deliver the pins to the corresponding bins or "spotting cups" as known in the 82-30's factory manuals, awaiting the next spotting cycle. In the 82-30, its semi-cylindrical "spotting cup" bins are part of the visible spotting table (unique to the design of the 82-30) suspended below the table's frame, each at a roughly a 45° angle with each "cup" inclined, pin-base-forward, in front of each spotting cell, and clearly visible to the bowler whenever the table approaches its lowermost position. After the table returns to its upper position, the sweep also lifts, and the machine shuts down to await the next ball. For spotting the new rack of pins, the 82-30 version tilts the pin-filled spotting cups vertically as the table descends, and tilts the cups slightly rearwards to clear the new rack of pins just as the table starts upwards, leaving the new rack of pins spotted on the lane for the next frame. Should the spotting cups not yet be filled with a full rack of ten pins for the next frame, the sweep bar pauses in its forward "guard" position after its rearwards stroke to clear any fallen pins, until the cups all have pins in them, with the table only descending when the cups have all filled, and are ready to set them onto the pin deck.

Beginning in December 1961, the 82-30 units also became famous for having the "Sparemaker" version of the earlier triangular pindicator screen on their masking units as advertised by AMF and their staff's pro bowler Dick Weber, which added a set of eleven lighted "arrows" to the usual numbered ten lights for standing pins, triangular corner lights that indicated the first or second ball to be rolled, and separate lights to indicate a foul, or a strike. The "arrows" were for the purpose of advising an inexperienced bowler to assist in spare conversion, by indicating where a second ball delivery should hit the remaining pins for a successful conversion, and were triggered by appropriate combinations of standing pins that helped the machine select which one of the eleven arrows to illuminate.

There have been specific upgrades and improvements made to the machines produced after the 82-30, with after-market solid-state/microprocessor-operated controllers available for the 82-30 itself. The 82-70 is the general standard in most AMF-equipped modern bowling centers today. It features a microprocessor-operated chassis that is upgraded to short cycle the machine for strikes, gutter balls, or 7–10 pick-offs. It features solid state motors. The 82-90 and the 82-90XLI are further upgrades, basically using the 82-70's mechanics, which replaced the older, completely electro-mechanical controls with machine status indicator lights, much more sophisticated "pin storage" design, single control centers that handle two machines, and perhaps the most important upgrade is the self shutdown control, which shuts the machine down to prevent damage from continuing to operate with a fault. The 82-90 models feature a deck that is thinner than the 82-70.

QubicaAMF Worldwide has also introduced many different scoring systems that are compatible with all pinsetters and pinspotters.

=== Brunswick A series ===
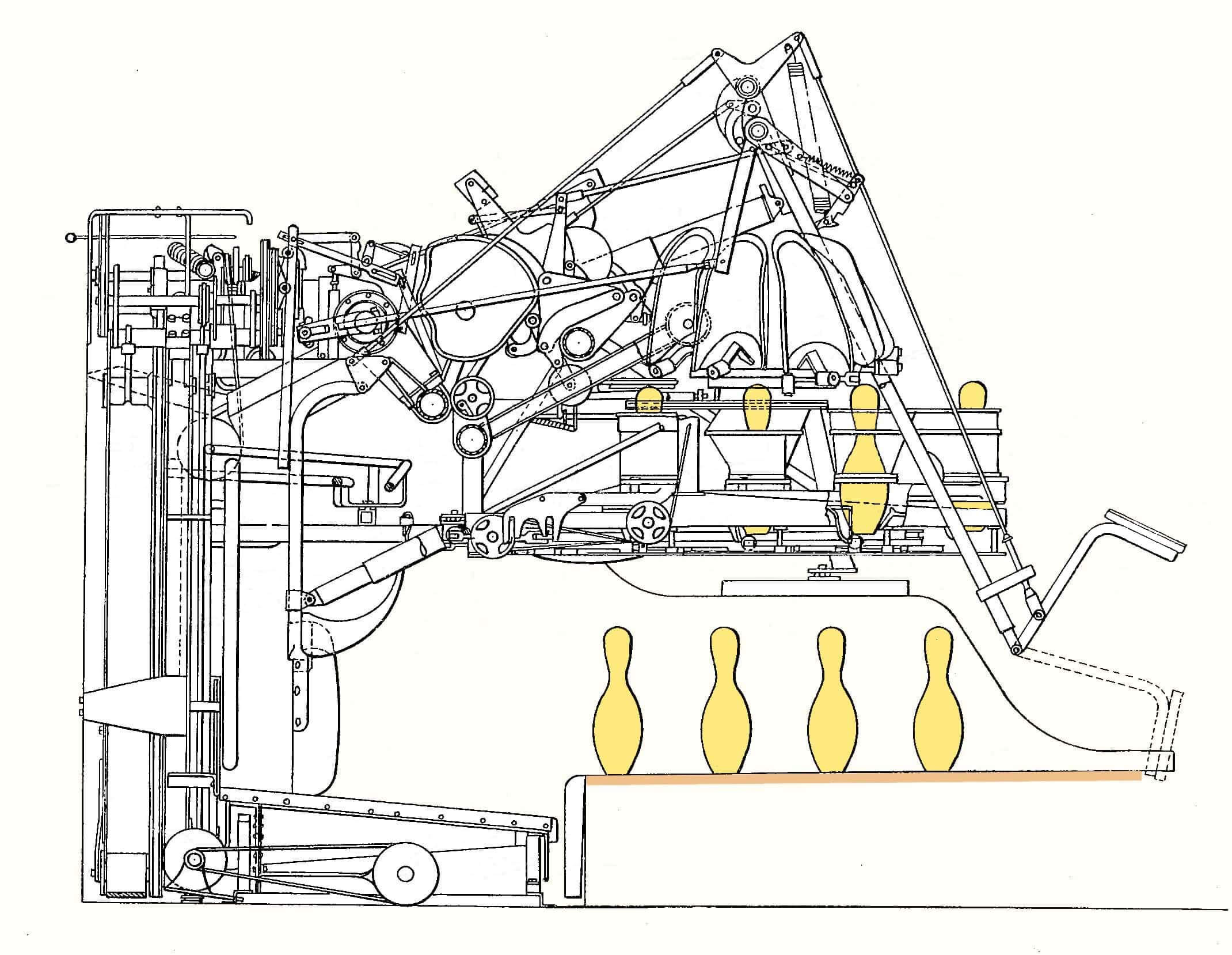
This 1961 Brunswick patent shows a second set of pins is preassembled above the deck to be ready for the next frame.

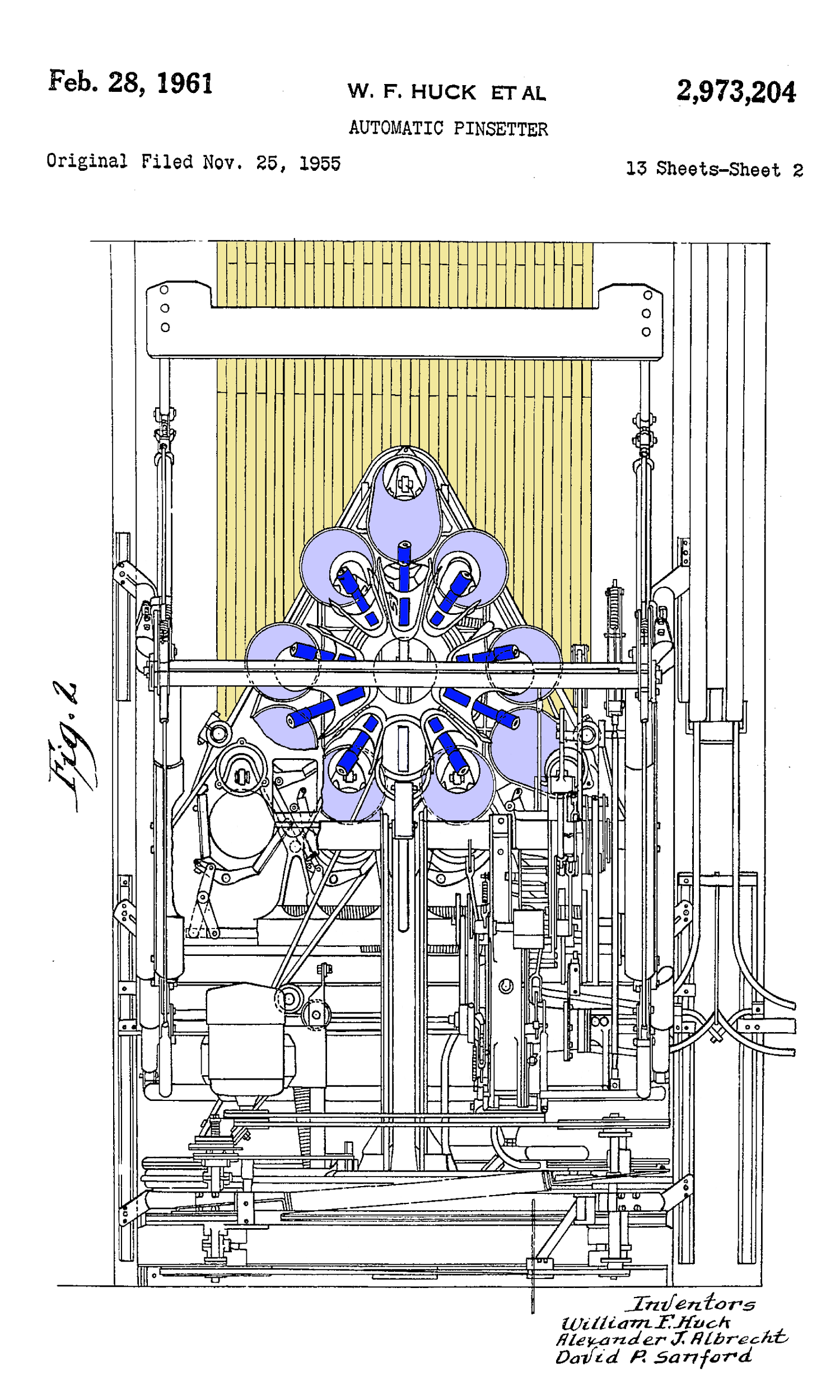
Top view: colored shading shows "buckets" into which the pins are loaded.

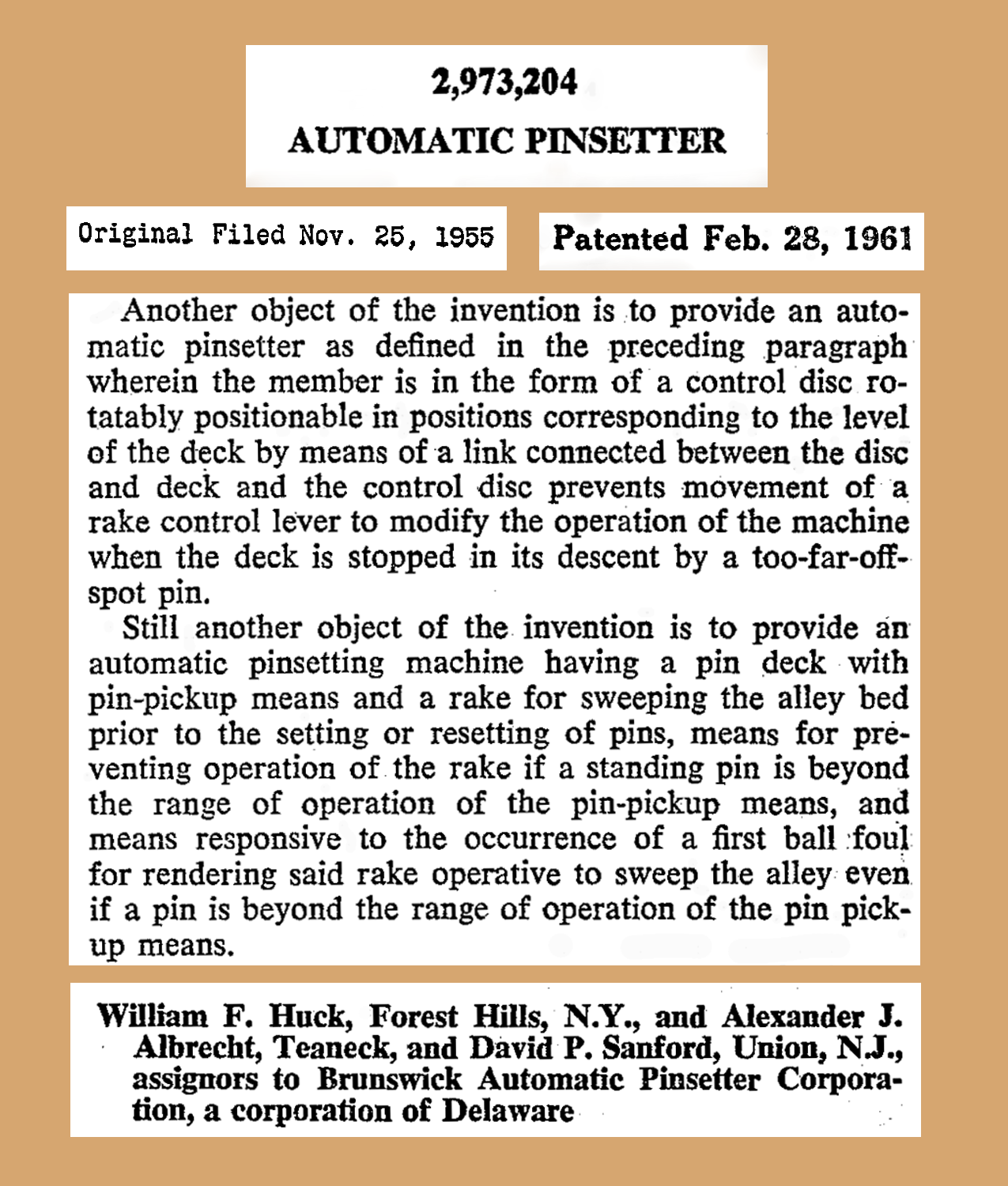
The stated objects of the Brunswick pinsetter included controlling the rake (pin sweeper) when an off-spot pin was encountered—inhibiting sweeping unless a first-ball foul was detected.

The Brunswick Model A, dating from 1956, as well as the developed A2 (1962) and the JetBack (1965) versions of it, work as follows.

When an A series pinsetter starts the reset process, balls and pins are pushed off the end of the lane by the rake or sweep onto a shaker board in place of the AMF-variety carpet belt. This "shaker board" transfers the ball and pins to the back of the pit, behind the lane's pin deck. Two rotating wheels, at the backside of the unit, are situated with their common axis along the bowling lane. The ball-lift wheel is the front most wheel and has a continuous smooth surface with cork strips adhered to grip and push the ball onto the lift rods. Pins fall rearwards through the unit into the pin wheel, which capture the pins and sends them up to the pin elevator, similar to the AMF unit's design.

When a ball rolls onto the ball-lift wheel, friction from the cork strips lifts the ball up onto the two lift rods that are covered with a rubber material. When the ball is between the lift rods and the ball wheel it is rolled upward and is dropped onto a metal track that leads the ball to an acceleration belt. The acceleration belt pushes the ball at a fast speed underneath the lanes until the ball is pushed upward by two wheels located at the head of the ball return track, where it is delivered back to the bowlers.

When a pin rolls back, the smaller diameter of the pin allows it to fall rearwards through the ball wheel. As the pins are moving from the shaker board, they will bounce around until it lands in a pocket in the pinwheel. The wheel brings the pin to the top and drops it into a metal tray, called a "turnpan", similar to the orientation pan that exists on the rear end of the AMF 82-30 unit's pivoting pin distributor arm. It's shaped somewhat like a scoop, with the lip of the scoop facing the front of the machine. From there a pin elevator lifts the pin up towards the top of the pinsetter, to drop into a rotating metal basket called the "pin turret", letting it slide into one of ten spots as the turret rotates – nine around the periphery in groups of three spots each, and one in the center for the number-5 pin. When a pin lands in an empty location in the turret, the turret rotates (or "indexes") so that the next pin will land in the next empty location, with the 5-pin chute in the center of the turret being filled last. Once the turret is full, and the spotting table reaches the top of its travel, all ten pins are simultaneously dropped from the turret into the spotting chutes of the table's upper level, holding them in the table's upper level as the table lowers them through its full downward travel close to the lanebed, to set the new rack of pins on the pin deck. As the table lowers towards the pin deck to set the new rack of pins, it is visibly protected with its attached sheet metal "deck shield", visible to the bowler at any time the spotting table needs to either descend part-way to handle standing pins after the first ball, or to fully descend (once loaded from the pin-turret above it) to set the new rack of pins for the next frame. The Model A, A-2 and JetBack series pinsetters all characteristically halt their operation, should the pin turret not yet be full of pins for the next frame, by pausing the sweep bar at the back of its rearwards travel and holding the table in its fully elevated position, until the pin-turret fills and releases its load into the spotting table's upper level.

This style of machine is typically loaded with 20 pins, though most proprietors normally put in 21 pins to facilitate quicker loading and faster operation of the pinsetter, especially in cases where the bowler(s) make two strikes in quick succession — on all the Model A-based unit designs, the "second ball cycle" used for both a second ball's delivery or a strike won't complete if the turret is not full, with the deck waiting in its elevated position as stated previously. Adding an extra pin does not put undue stress on the machine, but adding more than that is not advisable due to damage that can occur to the machine. Other centers will only load the pinsetter with 19 pins. Having only 19 pins in the machine will cause fewer stops from time to time but it will slow down the progress of the game if multiple strikes are thrown in succession.

The later A2 and JetBack versions, otherwise each virtually identical to the original Model A design, were augmented enough to have much faster ball return action than the original Model A units. the A-2 was also designed to be a faster machine overall to increase the number of frames that could be bowled in a given time frame, thus increasing the revenue of the bowling center.

The visible deck shield, as well as the noticeable sounds of pins entering the pin elevator (sounding like bowling pins rattling in a metal drum) and of the next set of pins dropping from the turret into the deck chutes, are unique to the Brunswick A series. There is a large Brunswick "crowned-B" (their 1950s logo) on the front of the deck shield of the Model A, "A-2" on the A-2 deck shield front, and "JetBack" on the JetBack deck shield front, unless these markings have been removed or covered by the bowling center proprietor.

=== Brunswick GS series ===
Detailed animation of operation
- External video
- How does a Bowling Pinsetter Machine work? (Brunswick GS-X)

The GSX is Brunswick's current pinsetter. It uses a conveyor belt on the pit floor to move the pins to a vertical elevator system similar to those on AMF 82 series pinspotters, while the ball exits the pit at the side through a ball door. Pins are loaded using a combination of belts. The ball-return system uses an under-lane accelerator as opposed to a lift. It lowers the pin table on every cycle to determine scoring.

The original model in the GS series (GS stands for Game Setter) was the GS-10, principally designed by Augusti Schmid in Scherzenbach, Switzerland to promote the sport of bowling in Europe. In 1984, Brunswick Bowling & Billiards Corporation acquired the rights to manufacture and sell the GS-10. The mechanical portion of the pinsetter was originally manufactured in the Brunswick plant in Stockach, Germany; in 1999, it was relocated to Hungary. The electronic control system is manufactured in Michigan, near the Brunswick plant in Muskegon, Michigan. Subsequent models are:

- GS-92 (1991) – Incorporated changes to the pinsetter to make it quicker to install and easier to service.
- GS-96 (1995) – Incorporated changes in the software and hardware to speed up loading time of the pinsetter.
- GS-98 (1997) – Incorporated a new consolidated electronic system that uses a two control box system to reduce the number of printed circuit boards needed to operate the pinsetter. Also, software and hardware improvements to make the pinsetter more efficient and user-friendly.
- GS-X (1999) – Incorporated a setting table and ball accelerator redesign that reduced the number of parts, the number of adjustments, and the amount of preventive maintenance required. In 2000 the GS-X consolidated electronics was replaced with a single box electrical system called the NexGen Controller. This change reduced the overall size, weight, and number of electrical components needed to operate the pinsetters and made the setup for the machine more user-friendly. An additional modification lowered the overall profile of the pinsetter, allowing it to be installed in centers with low ceilings and reducing the number of parts and adjustments and the amount of preventative maintenance required.
- GS-NXT (2022) - Incorporated a sweep bar system virtually identical to a pinspotter of AMF design, as well as refinements to reduce moving parts, number of adjustments, and the amount of preventative maintenance required. Also features a reduced height by 25%.

The GS is characterized by a sweep that rotates downward (as opposed to dropping) as soon as the ball enters the pin deck, with the exception of the GS-NXT, which features a more conventional sweep.

=== String-type ===
String pinsetter operation, from a US patent issued in 2024

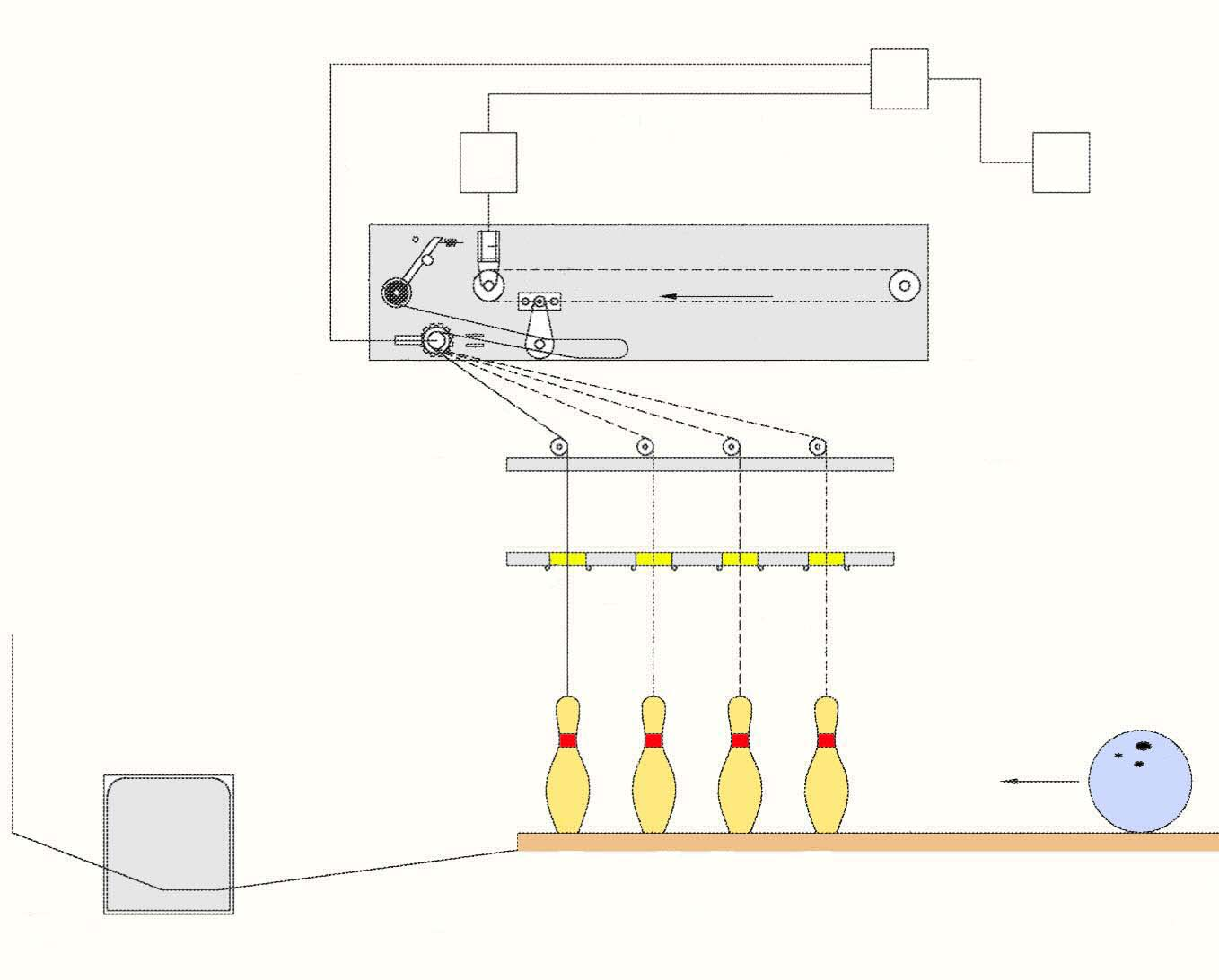
1) Ball approaches pins that strings have lowered into place.

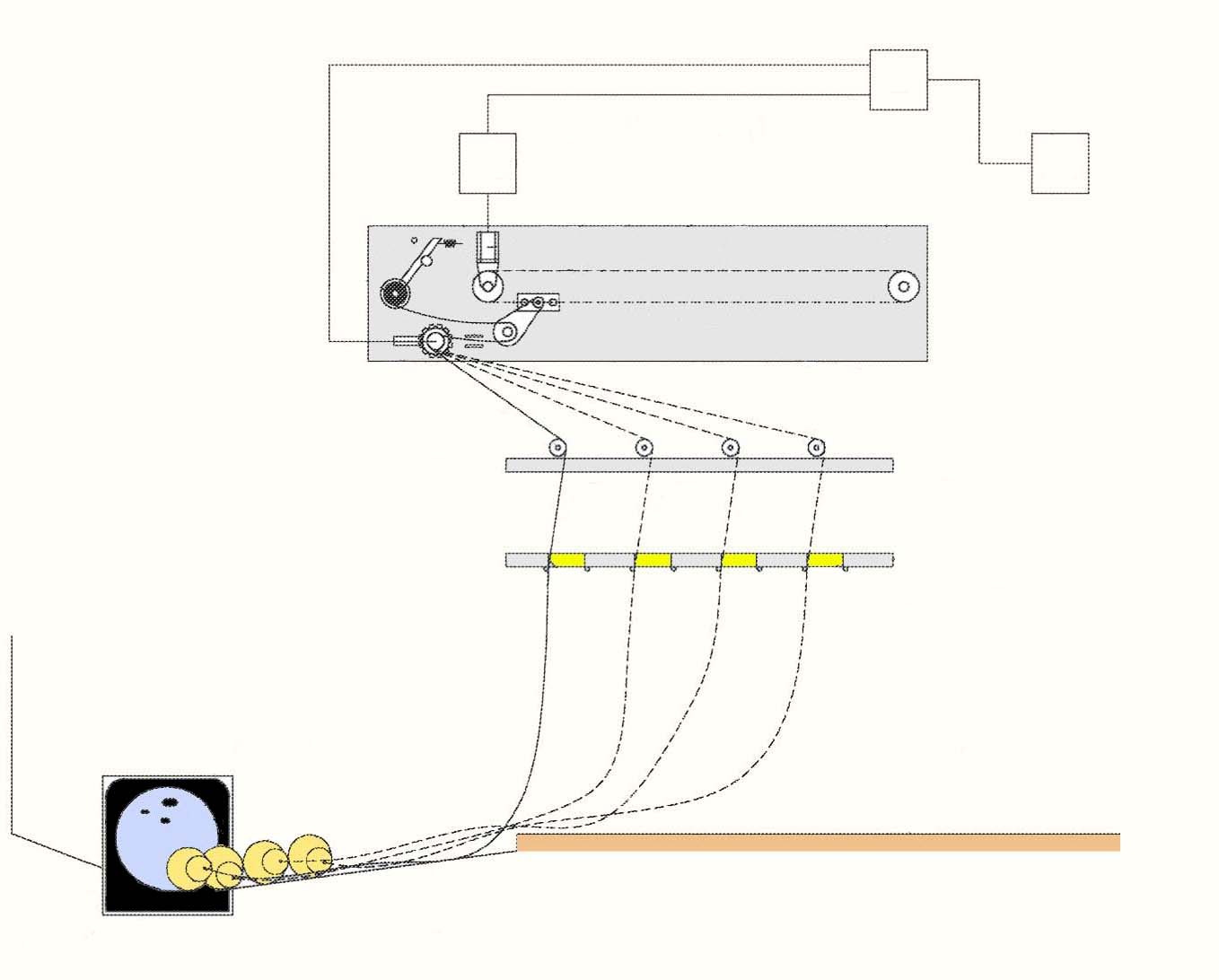
2) Ball knocks pins into a pit and exits to a ball return mechanism.

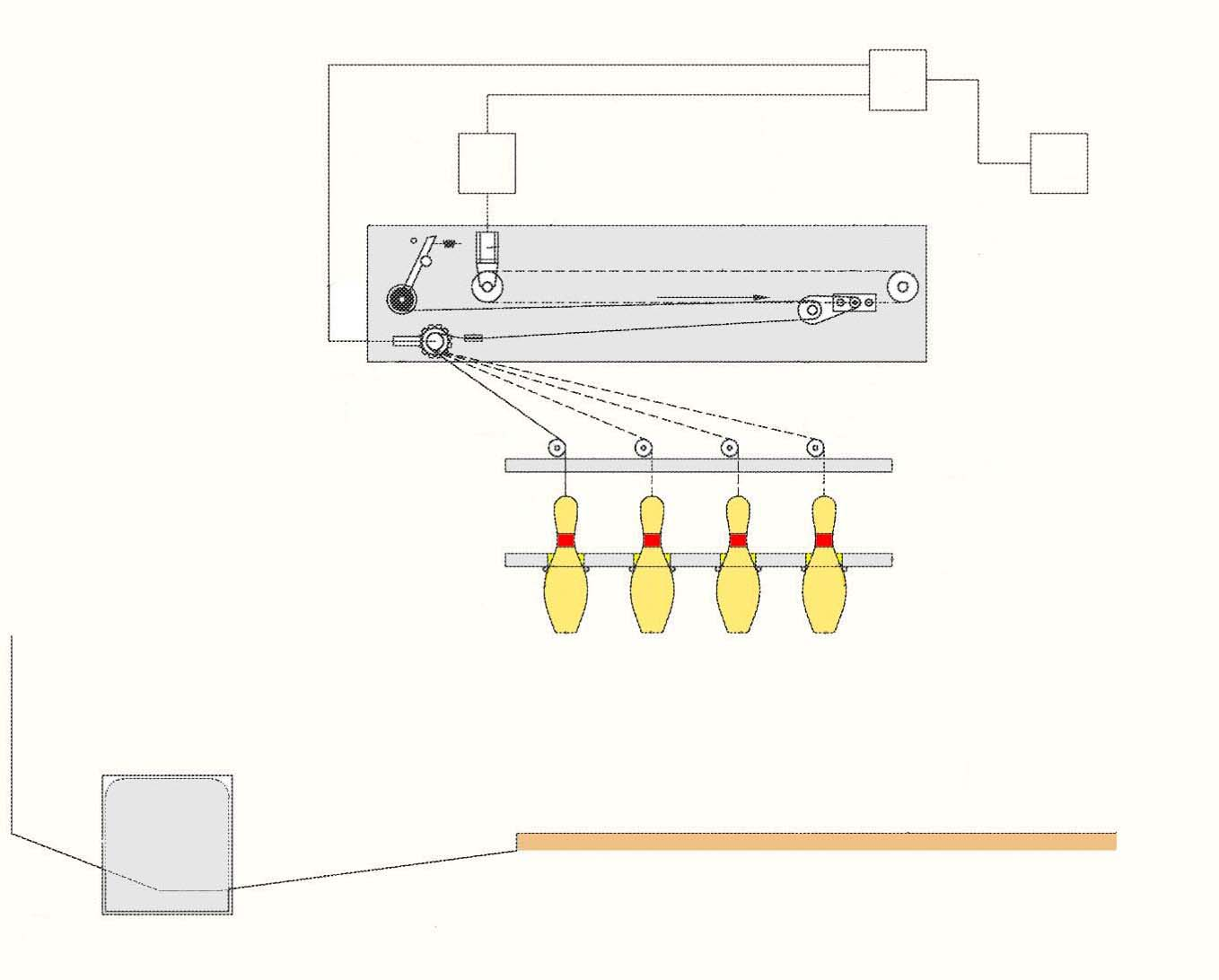
3) Strings retract the pins from the pit so they can be lowered into place.

- External video
- YouTube short: String pinsetter operation

String pinsetters, similar to those used for five-pin and some nine-pin lanes, utilize pins attached to cords; during their cycle, all ten pins are retracted into a frame above the lane, and the pins still standing are lowered back down into place. As their designs are less complex than traditional "freefall" pinsetters, they have a lower operational burden (with the most common breakdown being tangled cords), and a lower operational cost due to reduced maintenance requirements and electricity usage.

In the United States, string pinsetters were initially seen more often in casual venues such as bars and family entertainment centers, as well as personal bowling lanes installed in private homes, but began to see increasing adoption among traditional bowling centers in the 2020s. The adoption of string pinsetters has been divisive among players, as the cords change the physics and action of the pins, and the hardware had historically been perceived as a "gimmick" by professional bowlers. In April 2023, the United States Bowling Congress (USBC) announced that it would begin to sanction string pinsetters as "an independent category of equipment and competition" beginning in August 2023, with specifications (including a minimum length for the cords) intended to help preserve pin action that is closer to freefall.

The USBC had conducted multiple studies on the impact of string pinsetters on scoring, and determined that there was no statistically-significant differences in scoring pace between freefall and string setters, and that averages would therefore be interchangeable between them for handicapping purposes (albeit recommending that the type of hardware be recorded for monitoring purposes). However, the body did acknowledge that bowlers had slightly lower averages on string setters than freefall.

=== Other types ===
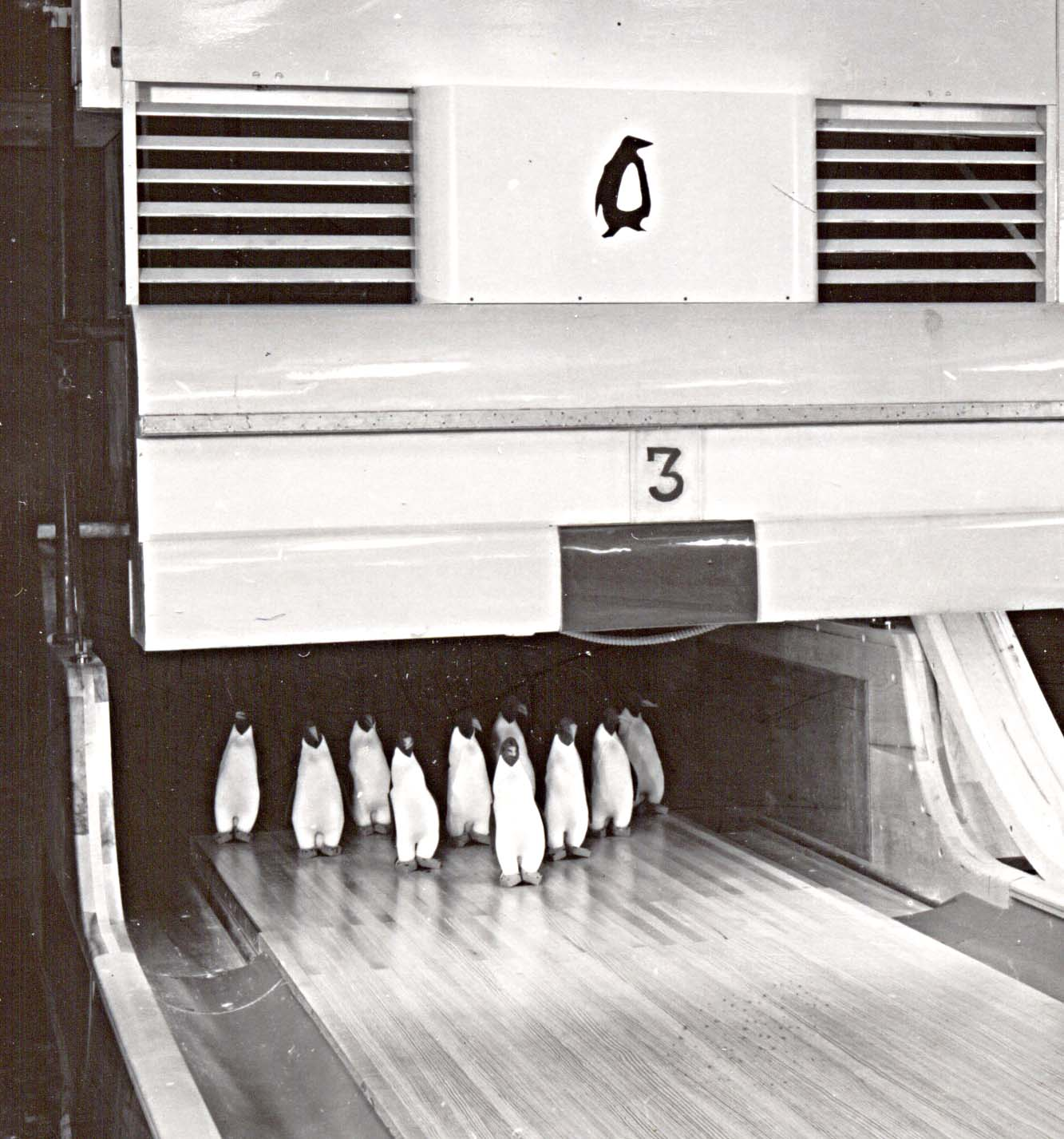
In 1961, the U.S. Navy Seabees constructed two lanes at McMurdo Station, Antarctica. Stuffed penguin "pins" were used in the inauguration.

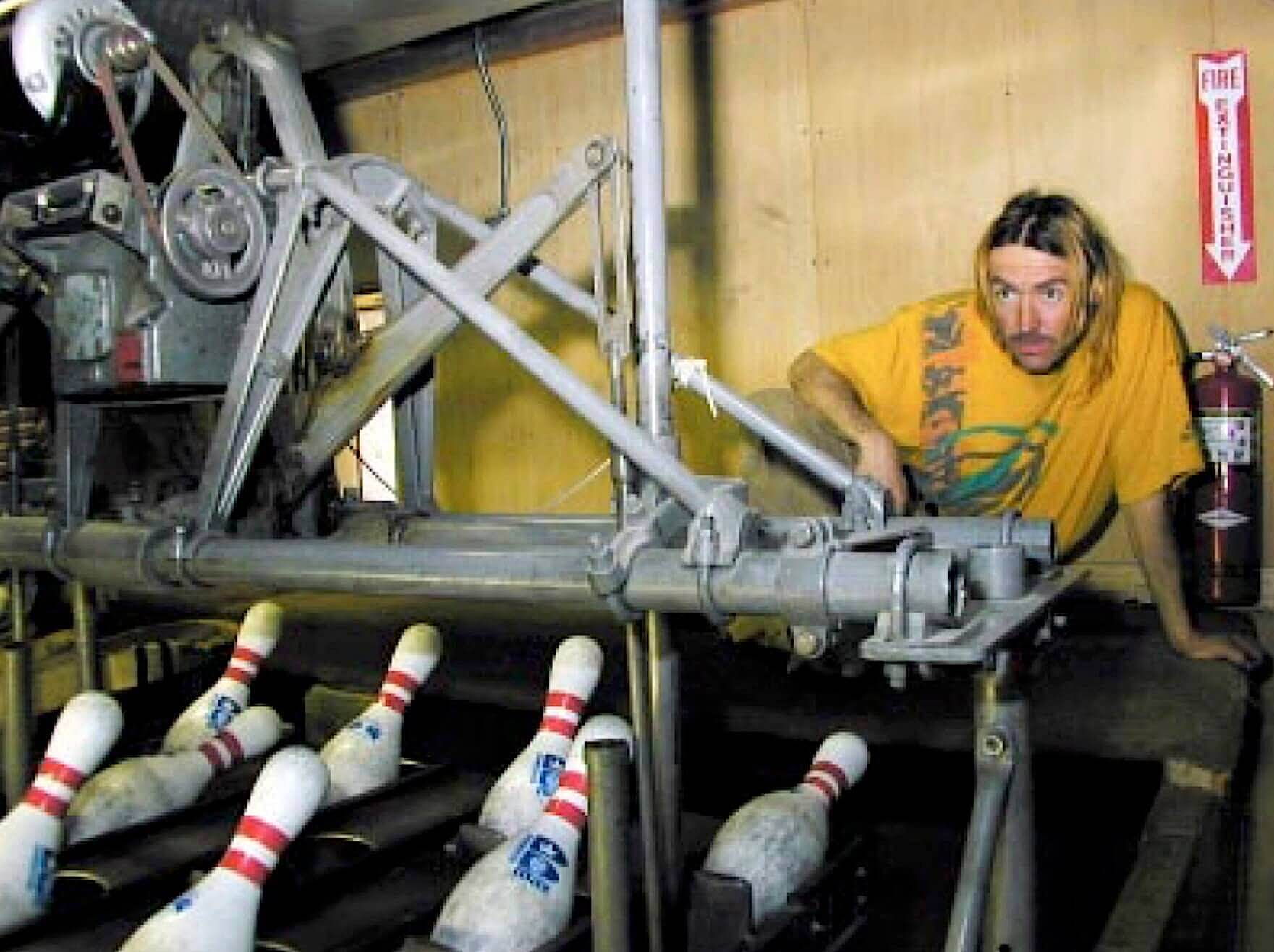
The McMurdo lanes, among very few in the world to have human pinsetters, were dismantled in 2009/2010 due to structural problems in the building.

The Mendes company produced a magnetic pinsetter known as the MM-2001. It featured a flat magnetic pin table and magnets on the head of each pin. It had a pit similar to the AMF and an elevator similar to the GSX. Pin loading involves the combination of a carousel and magazine. The company claimed this technology reduced stops in play due to table jams on out-of-range pins. Mendes was bought out by Qubica, which sold the machine as the MAG3 until its partnership with AMF.

The now-defunct Bowl Mor firm of central Massachusetts (no relation to Bowlmor AMF), which was more famous for its candlepin pinsetters, also made tenpin pinspotters early in their history. Some are still in service, with at least one bowling center in Japan having continued to use them, with some design features similar to the Brunswick Model A units in appearance and function.

The Furukawa Electric Company of Yokohama, Japan manufactured tenpin pinspotters early in the 1960s and well into the 1970s. Some are still in service, with at a few bowling centers in Japan The most popular model Furukawa Odin FBM-5 continues to be used, with some design features similar to the Brunswick Model A units in appearance and function. Likewise, the FBM-5 was exported to other countries around the Asia Pacific region.

== Candlepin pinsetters ==
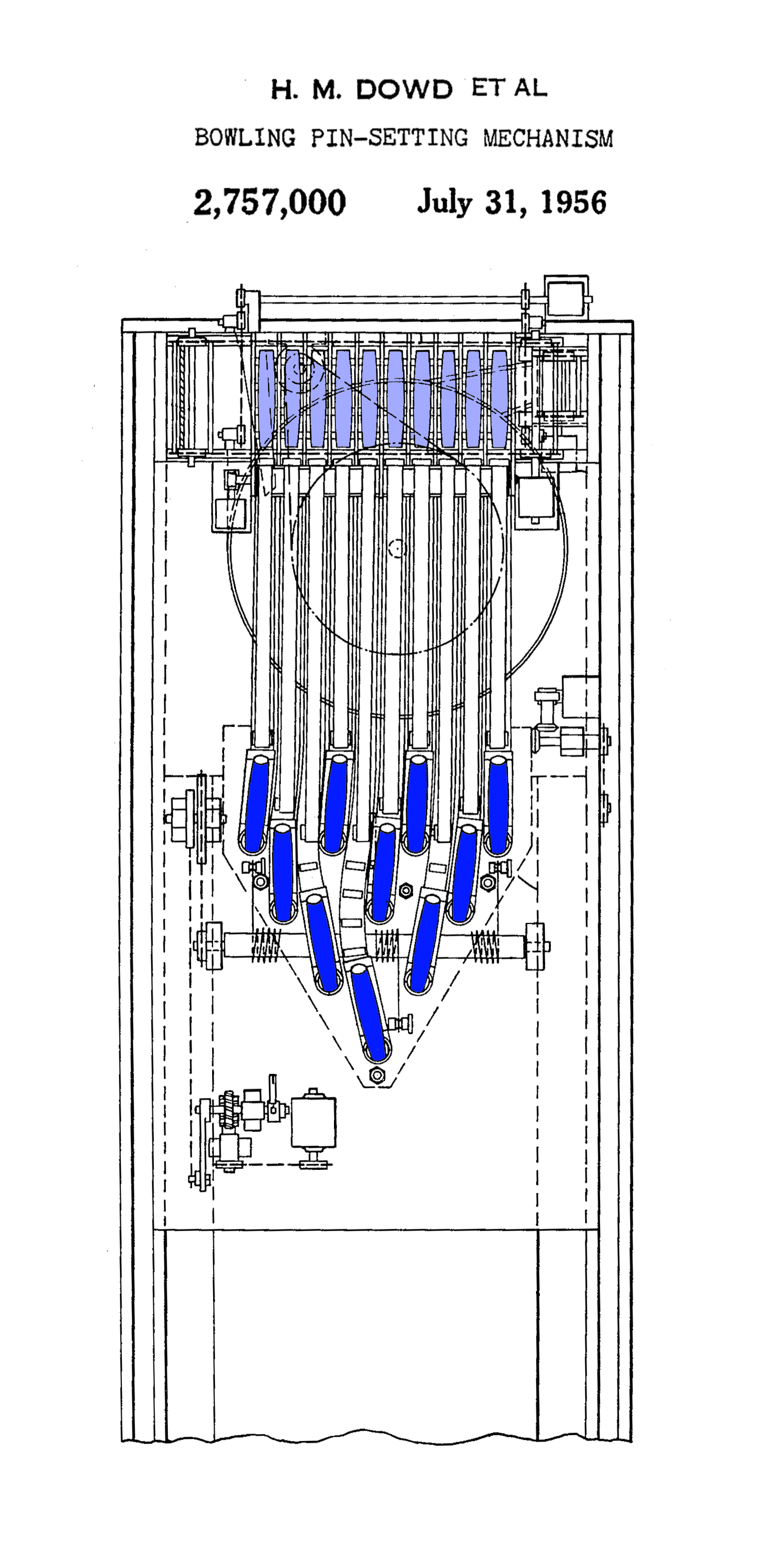
A 1956 patent granted to the inventors of the first automated candlepin pinsetter. (Blue shading not in original.)

The most common candlepin pinsetters were made by a Massachusetts company named Bowl-Mor (no relation to Bowlmor AMF), founded in the 1940s by attorneys Howard Dowd and R. Lionel Barrows. According to the International Candlepin Bowling Association (ICBA), Dowd and Barrows were searching for a business venture that could weather an economic depression. They found that participant sports met this requirement, and that bowling was one of the top three such sports at the time. The first Bowl-Mor pinsetters were installed at the now-defunct Whalom Park amusement park in 1949. Though no longer manufactured, refurbished units, parts and maintenance support are available from several vendors.

Bowl-Mor pinsetters have a depressed pit approximately 14" long at the end of the bowling lane, placed about 4" below the level of the lane surface, with a heavy curtain behind it, hanging past the lane surface but not touching the bottom of the pit. The curtain arrests the backwards motion of struck balls and pins so that they fall onto the pit. When a reset takes place, a "twin-board" sweep bar descends, driven by a roller chain drive system on each side of the machine along a pair of L-shaped tracks, and sweeps the pins and balls off the lane, rearwards off the pin-plate, past the curtain, and onto a rotating turntable in the pit with eight flat radial "fences" to push the pins rearwards. The turntable's fences separate the ball from the pins by centrifugal force, sending pins into the pin elevator.

Candlepin pinsetter elevator that can lift pins and balls

A pin elevator composed of a roller chain-driven rotating rack of open frames (similar to an industrial toaster) catches the candlepins and hauls them towards the top of the machine. It then turns 90 degrees, moving the pins horizontally past ten conveyors, each wide enough to hold a pin lengthwise. Unlike the pinspotters used for tenpins and duckpins, candlepins have identically shaped ends, so the machine does not have to orient the candlepins in a particular direction. The pins fall off the end of the conveyors into spotting tubes, mounted at their base onto the plate that forms the main part of the spotting table. As the sweep nears the forward end of its travel and begins its ascent to its resting position, the table drops to the metal-plated pin deck at the end of the lanebed, releases a set of pins, then ascends to its own resting position, ready to be filled with pins again.

A separate elevator next to the turntable transports the balls to the ball return system, which has a near-vertical ramp that the balls roll down to gain enough momentum to roll through either an above-lane or submerged trough back up the alley, entering the ball return rack next to the approach area where players can grab them. Bowl Mor pinsetters are stocked with 24 to 27 pins, and are deemed substantially more reliable than typical Ten-pin bowling pinsetters. Due to the playing rules of candlepin bowling allowing fallen "dead wood" pins to remain on the lane between each ball's roll, no provision has ever been made for "spotting cells" in a candlepin pinsetter's spotting table, simplifying the machines' design. Most parts of the machine are driven by chains – especially the sweep board's drive system, on two L-shaped tracks on either side of the unit – or belts.

AMF manufactured candlepin pinsetters for a short time in the 1960s, using a Bowl-Mor style spotting table and an adapted tenpin-style sweep bar that operated at an unusually rapid pace during its sweep.

Unless triggered by an automated scoring unit, candlepin pinsetters must be started by the bowler at the conclusion of a frame, by pressing a button or foot pedal.

== Five-pin pinsetters ==
Five-pin bowling is a popular variation in Canada, and pinsetters fall into two categories: string and free-fall. String pinsetters are more prevalent, and consist of machines attached to the head of each pin, by means of a cord. Essentially, the pinsetter is triggered by the movement of any pin by more than an inch or two. With that, the machine lowers a guard, pulls up all 5 pins, and resets those that did not move. There is, on average, a three-second lag from when the pins were knocked down to when the guard is lowered. The pit floor is angled such that the ball is gravity-fed to a track that leads to an elevator. The elevator lifts the ball to the return track.

Free-fall 5-pin pinsetters work in a similar way to their ten-pin counterparts, and requires initiation by the bowler pressing a "reset" button as a candlepin unit does to "cycle" it, when a ball is bowled or pin knocked down. When the player pushes their "Reset" button, the machine lowers a guard, lifts standing pins and sweeps away the downed pins. If it does not recognize any standing pins, it sets up a new set for the next frame. Unlike tenpin, balls and pins are picked up in the same elevator or conveyor and are separated at the top of the machine.

The PBS family of pinsetters are the most frequently used, and many consider the PBS as the workhorse of the industry. The PBS family includes models made by Schmid & Company (sometimes branded as BowlOMatic) as well as the CA-1. These machines are straight electrical and do not require air compressors unlike pneumatic machines. The Schmid machines ran using relays while the CA-1 used circuit boards. The PBS brand was bought out by Brunswick, who introduced a second generation Schmid pinsetter dubbed the 81-5 as well as a 10-pin string pinsetter and a convertible five-ten pin machine marketed as the Chamelion.[7]

The Mendes family of string pinsetters is not as common as the PBS family. Mendes machines are easily spotted for its shield that descends on a hinge like a closing door. The machine may immediately start up if all the pins are knocked down. The early Mendes string pinsetters were pneumatic. They released an electrical version of the machine known as the ME90. Mendes was bought out by Qubica—now QubicaAMF Worldwide. The machine is now marketed by QubicaAMF under the TMS name [8] These machines are available for five and ten pin, but there is no convertible version.

Paule Computer Systems marketed a third family of pinsetter as the Merlin, a convertible five/ten pin string pinsetter that uses 15 strings.[9] The PBS version uses 12 strings—a changeover requires the headpin and the two corners to be restrung.

== Duckpin pinsetters ==
Duckpin bowling is played in two varieties:

Regular duckpin bowling, popular in the northeastern and mid-Atlantic United States. A popular pinspotter in this sport is the Sherman model, named after its inventor, Ken Sherman, which was produced from 1953 to 1973. It has continuously moving conveyor belts at the ends of the gutters beside the pin deck as required by the sport's ruling body, the National Duckpin Bowling Congress that move fallen pins to the pit. The Sherman's sweep device is located on the right side, vertical "kickback" panel of the lane and pivots 180 degrees (much like a fence gate) to clear pins. The pin table always handles the pins by the neck. A new rack of pins is created with a moving magazine that is shaped like a pin triangle. When the magazine is loaded and the bowler is ready for a new set of pins, a lever pushes the magazine unit out to the pin table so it can take the pins out of the magazine and then set them down on the lane. The Bowl-Mor company also made a duckpin pinspotter for a time, using a similar sweep device to its more famous candlepin machines.

Soft belly or rubberband duckpin, played in Quebec. Most of these bowling centers use a string-type pinsetter similar to five-pin. The free-fall machine for this sport features a rotating turntable in the pit floor similar to a Bowl-Mor candlepin unit, conveyor belts in the gutters as required in the regular duckpin game in the US, an elevator similar to the Brunswick GSX, a turret similar to the A-2, and a rather flat-looking pin table. The sweep is similar to the candlepin Bowl-Mor.

== List of pinsetter-related deaths ==
Some bowling alley staff have been killed or fatally injured in pinsetting machinery accidents, often as a result of crushing or asphyxiation. Examples that received press coverage include:

Date	Victim	Description	Location	Manufacturer & Model
March 2, 1959	John Christiano	A 52-year-old Garwood resident and employee was killed when his head was caught between a single Golden Crown alley wall and a Brunswick Model A pinsetter at Clark Lanes in Clark, New Jersey.	Clark, New Jersey	Brunswick Model A
January 1, 1967	Robert Cushing	The 32-year-old mechanic at Bristol Bowling Lanes in Bristol, Connecticut was crawling underneath to fix a jammed pin when an unknown-modeled pinsetter crushed his head. He was transported to a Hartford hospital where he died from natural causes.	Bristol, Connecticut	Unknown
June 1968	Rosella Gardner	A 45-year-old female employee at Kingman Lanes in Kingman, Kansas was leaning into an AMF 82-30 pinsetter to dislodge some pins when she forgot to power off the pinsetter. The sweeper dropped on her and the shuttle pinned her head and neck. She was taken to a nearby hospital where she was pronounced dead several days later.	Kingman, Kansas	AMF 82-30
January 16, 1972	Joe Louis Chavez	A 36-year-old University of New Mexico employee was killed when his head was caught in the machinery of an unknown-modeled pinsetter at the Student Union bowling alley in Albuquerque, New Mexico.	Albuquerque, New Mexico	Unknown
March 13, 1973	Lloyd Roush	The 64-year-old employee from St. Clair Shores was crushed to death by an unknown-modeled pinsetter while attempting to fix the setter at Gold Crown Lanes in Troy, Michigan.	Troy, Michigan	Unknown
March 13, 1985	Brian Schreck	The 21-year-old son of the owner of Broadway Lanes in Fullerton, Nebraska, died from asphyxia after his chest was crushed by an unknown-modeled pinsetter. His body wasn't discovered until 12 hours later when he was found being hooked up to the machine.	Fullerton, Nebraska	Unknown
July 14, 1986	Jimmie Carroll Ward II	Shortly after closing for the night, the 25-year-old employee from Clute was killed by an AMF 82-70 pinsetter at the Huntsville Lanes Bowling Center in Huntsville, Texas. The machine trapped him underneath while attempting to remove a pin from the gutter during an overnight game against several other employees.	Huntsville, Texas	AMF 82-70
October 16, 1988	Unidentified	An unnamed employee at Fair Lanes in Aurora, Colorado was crawling underneath an AMF 82-70 pinsetter without rendering the machine electrically safe when his foot activated the pinsetter and was crushed to death between the shuttle and the machine's table.	Aurora, Colorado	AMF 82-70
April 29, 1995	Unidentified	An unidentified employee at North Shore Entertainment in Bigfork, Montana was removing a stuck pin that was hung up on a Brunswick A2 pinsetter when his chest and head became caught in the shuttle during a cycle. He was taken to a nearby hospital where he was pronounced dead after arrival.	Bigfork, Montana	Brunswick A2
January 8, 2003	Devan Young	The 29-year-old employee at West Acres Bowl in Wichita, Kansas was killed by an AMF 82-70 pinsetter.	Wichita, Kansas	AMF 82-70
July 6, 2006	Ferdinand Dela Cruz	A 34-year-old technician from Barking, London, United Kingdom, was crushed to death by an AMF 82-70 pinsetter inside Lane 18 at Hollywood Bowl in neighboring Dagenham.	Dagenham, England	AMF 82-70
September 18, 2006	Toby Lee Williams	A 20-year-old mechanic from Moore, Oklahoma died from traumatic asphyxia after he was trapped inside a Brunswick A2 pinsetter while attempting to remove a jammed pin at the defunct AMF Moore Lanes.	Moore, Oklahoma	Brunswick A2
February 19, 2009	Erik Anderson	A 38-year-old faculty member and running coach was killed by a Brunswick A2 pinsetter at the Spokane Community College Lair-Student Center in Spokane, Washington, after the machine pinned his neck while attempting to dislodge a pin.	Spokane, Washington	Brunswick A2
February 20, 2011	Unidentified	An unidentified employee at 300 Dallas in Addison, Texas was fixing a jammed Brunswick A2 pinsetter when he reached into the machine through its left-side frame to remove the jam. His arm became caught in the deck assembly components and pulled him from the machine before being crushed to death.	Addison, Texas	Brunswick A2
November 6, 2014	David Geiger	The 53-year-old employee at Northwest Lanes in Fairfield, Ohio, was pulled to death after his hooded sweatshirt became entangled by an AMF 82-70 pinsetter shuttle while repairing inside one of its lanes. A co-worker at Northwest Lanes replied to authorities that he had a request to fix a problem before walking inside the lanes. After a long wait, employees tried to call him back before finding the body in the pinsetter. OSHA later confirmed his death as an accidental traumatic asphyxia.	Fairfield, Ohio	AMF 82-70
September 8, 2015	Vidal Garcia	A 29-year-old man working at the Galaxy Bowling Center in Brownsville, Texas, died from strangulation when his shirt collar tangled in a defective AMF 82-70 pinsetter, strangling him as the machine twisted the collar tighter. An OSHA inspection found that the machine's unguarded, rotating shafts and improper shutdown of a control panel at Galaxy led to his death.	Brownsville, Texas	AMF 82-70
September 30, 2018	Ector Rodriguez	A 65-year-old Penrose manager and mechanic died after getting stuck inside one of eight Brunswick Model A pinsetters at Fremont Lanes in Florence, Colorado. One of the employees last saw the victim walking towards the pinsetters, adding that she hasn’t seen him in about 15 to 20 minutes. She went back to check on him and discovered him trapped inside the pinsetter.	Florence, Colorado	Brunswick Model A
July 7, 2019	Unidentified	A 27-year-old female employee at Blackhawk Bowl And Martini Lounge inside Hotel Blackhawk in Davenport, Iowa was electrocuted to death when she came into contact with a live 208-volt electrical system that was unguarded while attempting to unjam a Brunswick A2 pinsetter.	Davenport, Iowa	Brunswick A2
March 5, 2022	Brion T. Farr	The 50-year-old Horseheads resident and co-owner of Crystal Lanes in Corning, New York, was killed in a pin-setting accident involving an AMF 82-70 pinsetter.	Corning, New York	AMF 82-70
July 27, 2022	Unidentified	An unnamed employee was choked to death by a USBowling string pinsetter inside Lane 3 at Punch Bowl Social in Austin, Texas, after his neck got caught between a stationary horizontal bar and a horizontal bar that travels the length of the machine driven by chains on either side that changes the length of the strings that attached to the pins.	Austin, Texas	USBowling string units
July 8, 2024	Scott Willoughby	A 59-year-old local bar owner was crushed to death by an AMF 82-30 pinsetter while installing two vintage Magic Triangle bowling lanes inside the Esmond Bar in Esmond, North Dakota.	Esmond, North Dakota	AMF 82-30
