= Bowling pin =

Target in sport of bowling

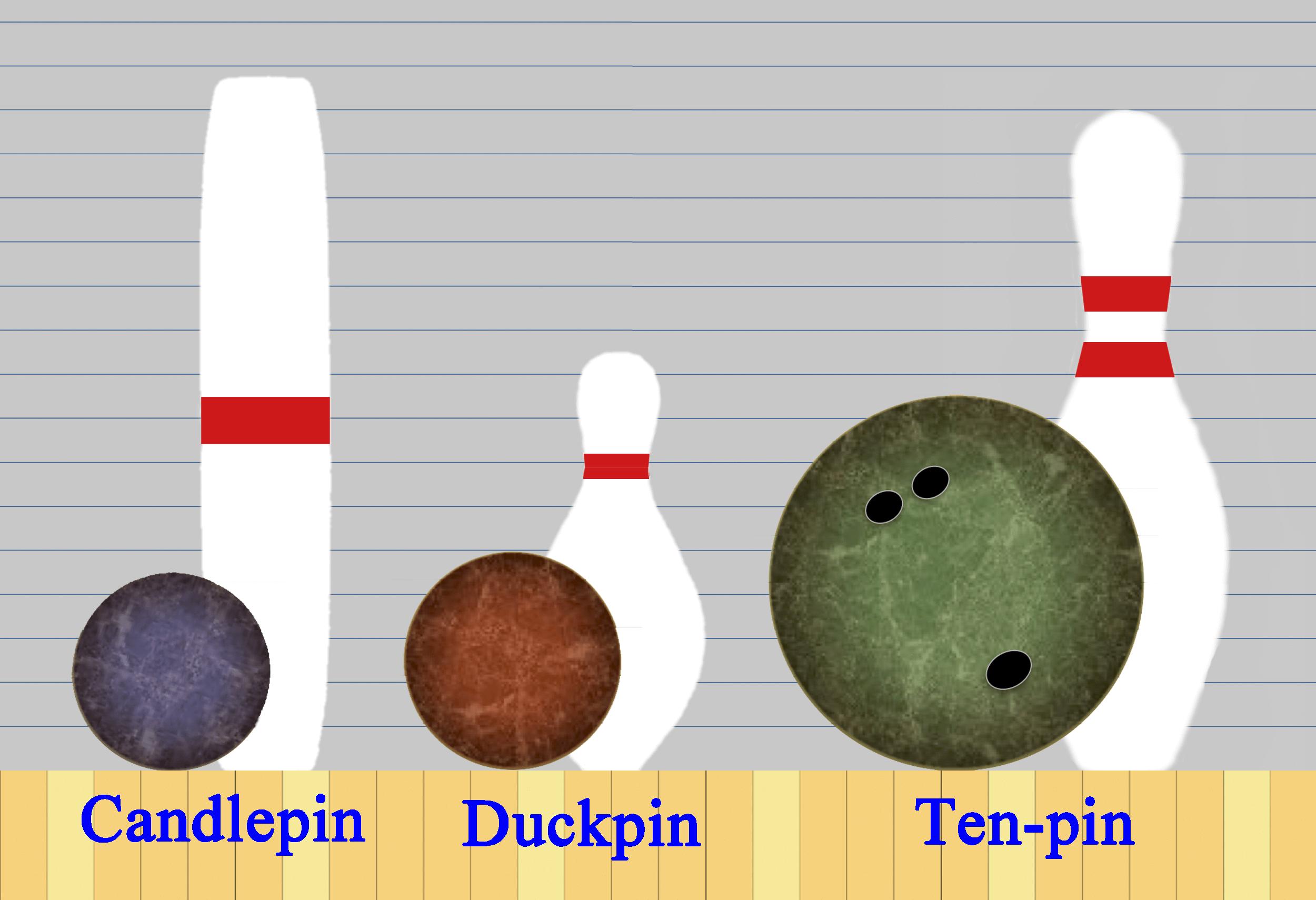
Scale diagram of bowling pins and balls for several variants of the sport. The horizontal blue lines are 1 inch (2.5 cm) apart vertically.

Bowling pins (historically also known as skittles or kegels) are upright elongated solids of rotation with a flat base for setting, usually made of wood (esp. maple) standing between 9 and 16 inches (23 and 41cm) tall. Some have interior voids to adjust weight and balance. Pins are coated with plastic and painted, by convention mostly white with (usually) transaxial red stripes or other markings around the neck or middle (candlepins). Sets of pins, usually 5, 9, or 10 in a triangular arrangement, are the target of the bowling ball in various bowling games including tenpins, five-pins, duckpins and candlepins.

== Tenpins ==
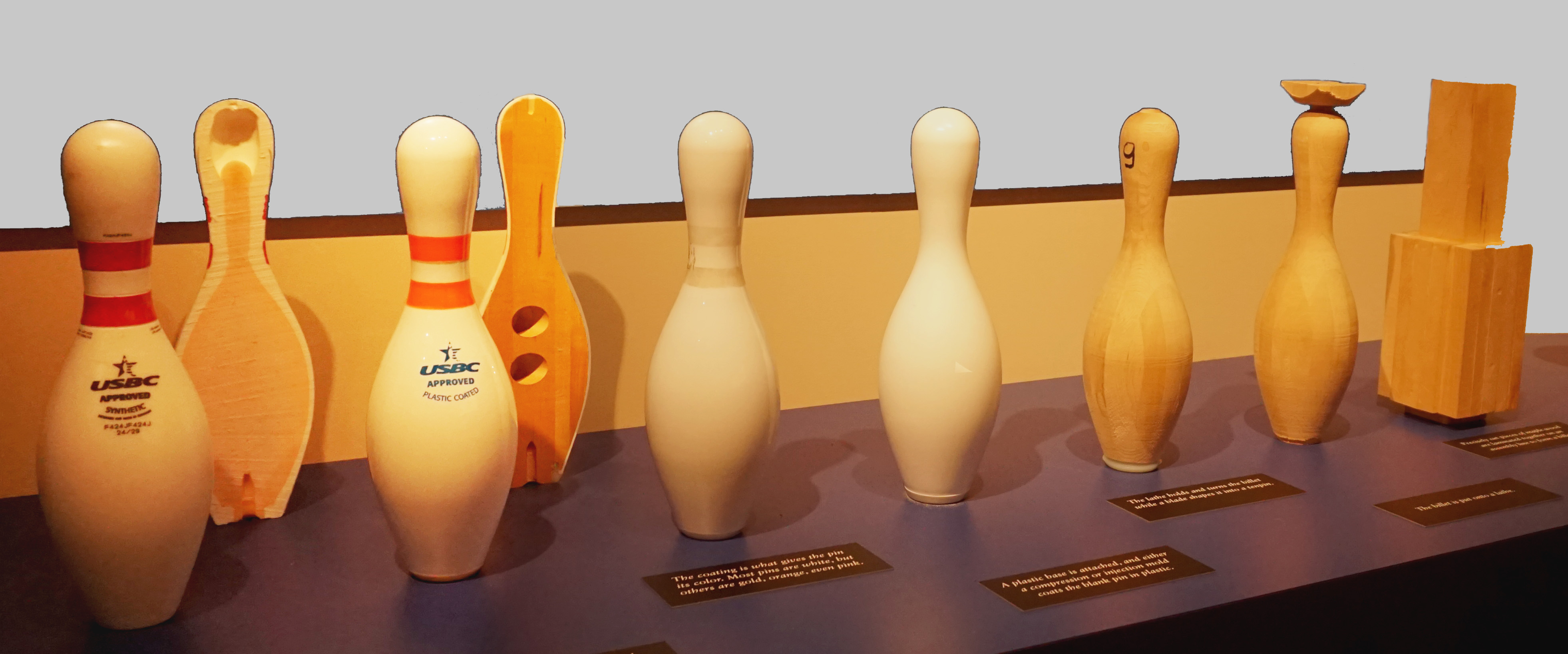
Tenpin bowling pins shown at different stages of manufacture. From right to left: a lathe shapes a pin from a block of wood before it is coated with plastic. Inner voids (spaces affecting center of gravity and tipping point) are also visible.

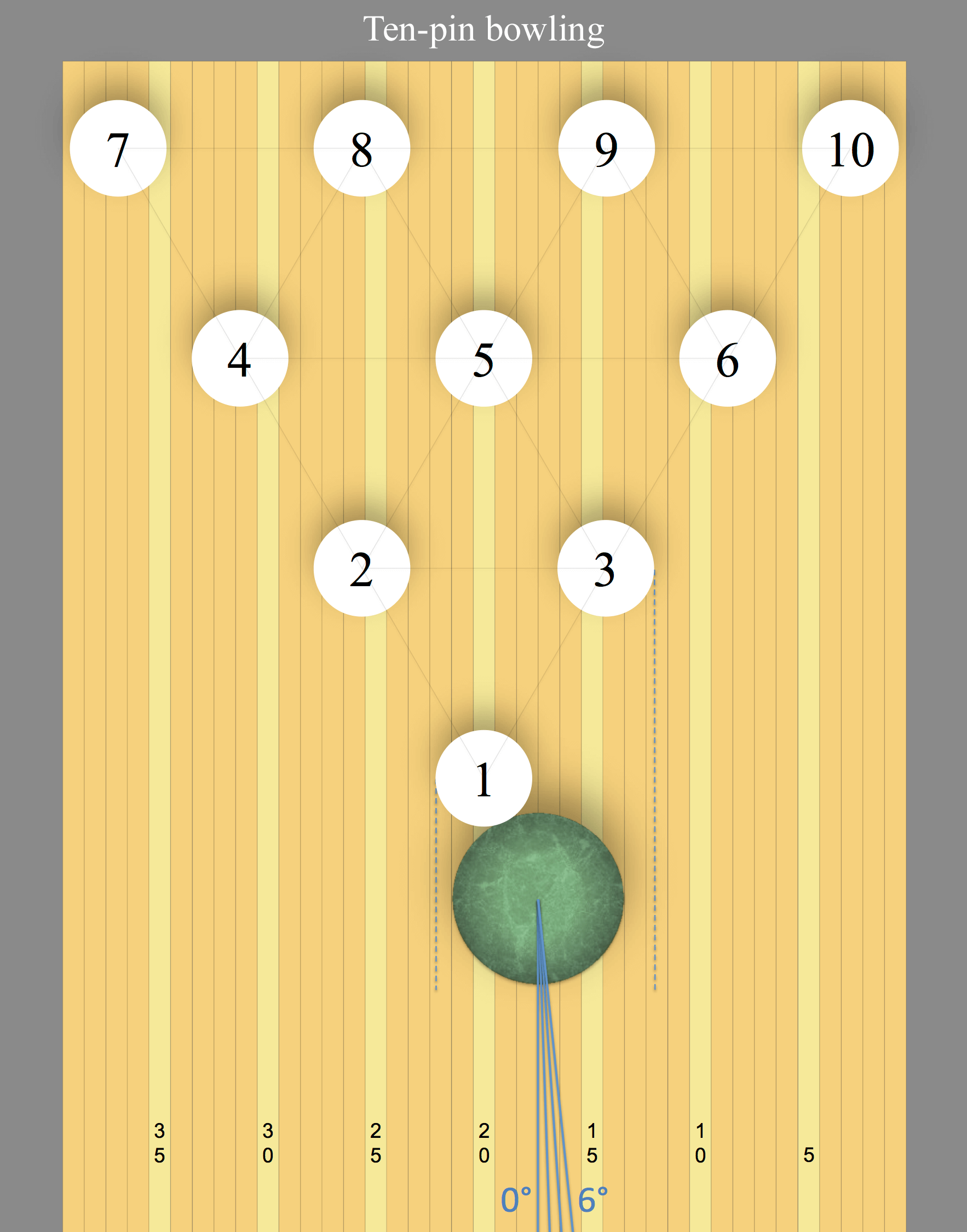
Tenpins to scale on a bowling lane

Pin specifications are set by the United States Bowling Congress (USBC). World Bowling, formerly World Tenpin Bowling Association, has adopted the USBC specifications. Pins are 15 inches (380 mm) tall, 4.75 inches (121 mm) wide at their widest point, and weigh 3 pounds 8 ounces (1.6 kilograms) ±2 ounces (0.057 kilograms). The first British made tenpin was by H Massil and sons who received the permit no.1 from the British Tenpin Bowling Association (BTBA)

In 2023, the USBC certified string pinsetters (SPs) without any score adjustment compared to mechanical freefall pinsetters (FFPs), while acknowledging that bowlers have slightly lower averages when using SPs. String pinsetters are less expensive and easier to maintain, motivating bowling centers to phase them in.

== Duckpins and fivepins ==
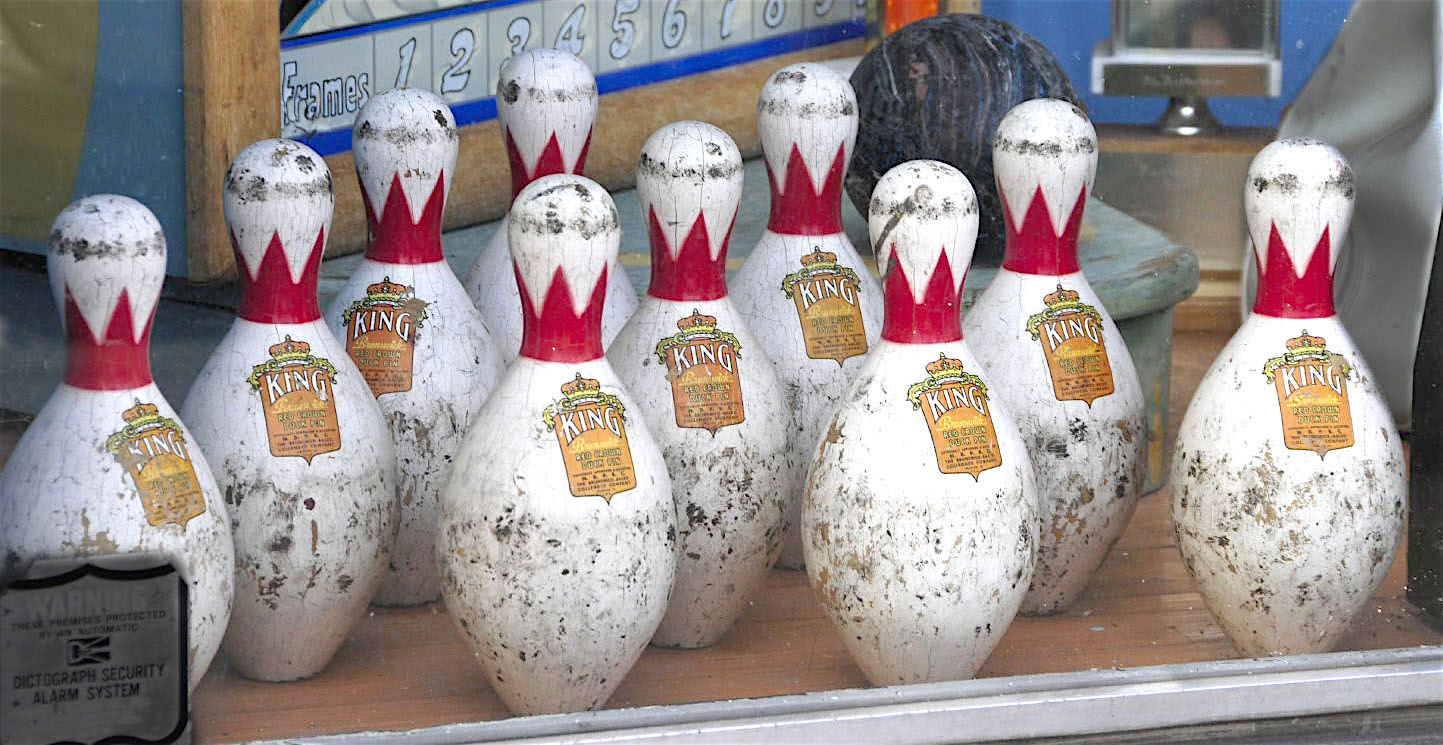
Duckpins (displayed closer than they would be placed on a bowling lane)

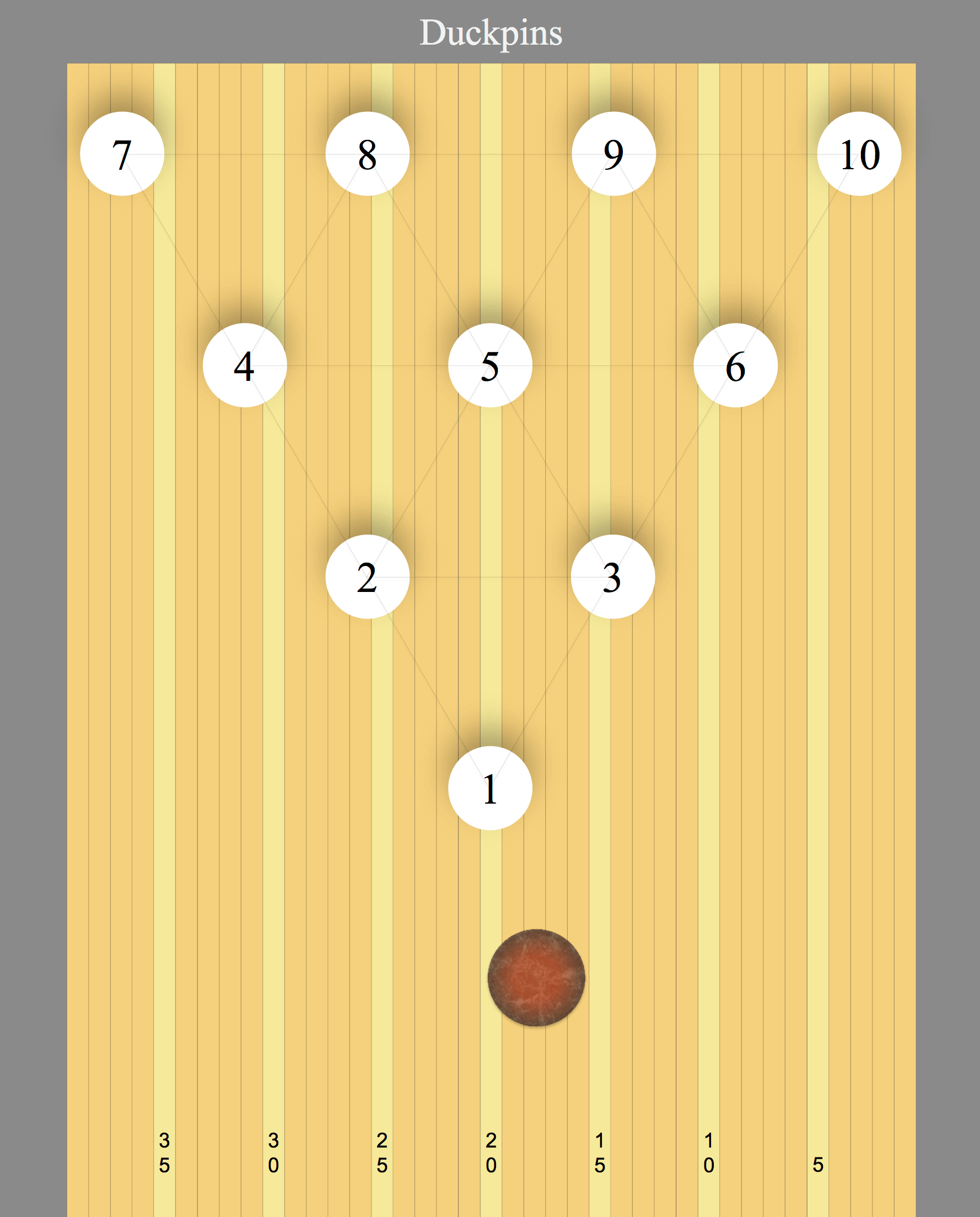
Duckpins on a bowling lane

Duckpins are shorter and squatter than standard tenpins. Canadian fivepins are between duckpins and tenpins in size, but have a thick, inch-wide rubber band around the widest part of the pin to increase pin action when struck.

== Candlepins ==
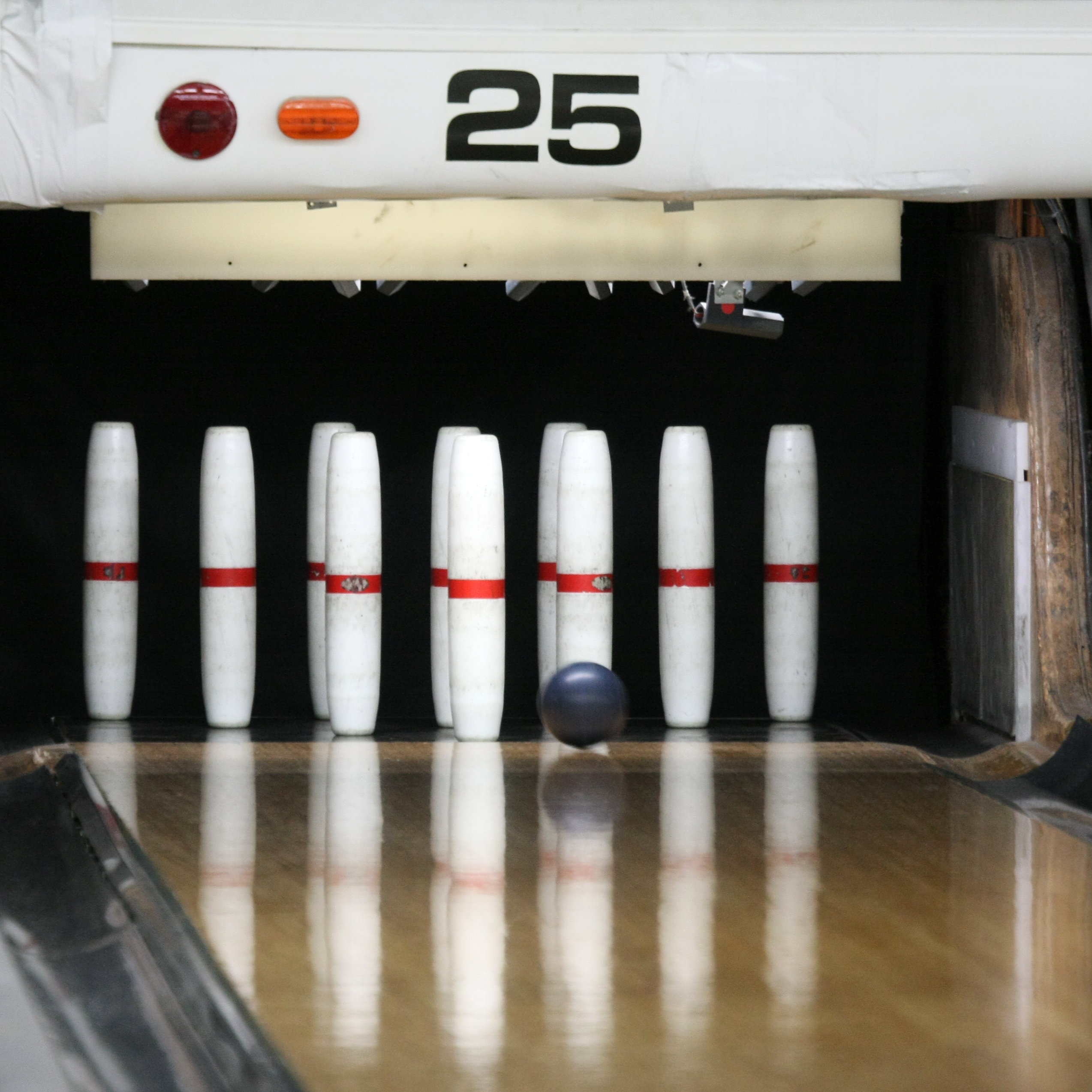
A full rack of ten candlepins, with the sport's small ball.

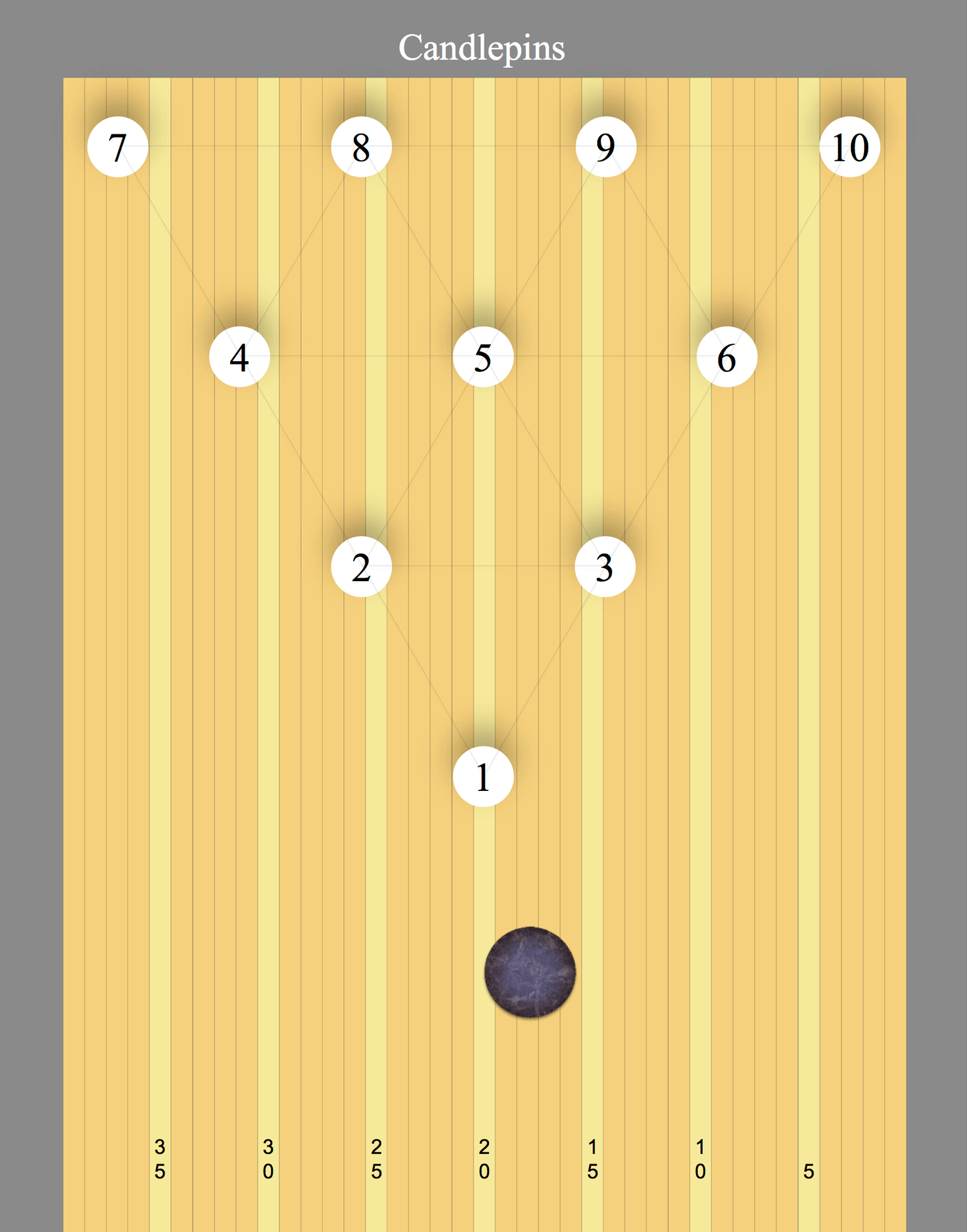
Candlepins to scale on a bowling lane

Candlepins are dissimilar to the others, being the tallest of all at 15 3/4 inches (40 cm), but only 2 15/16 inches (7.5 cm) wide and 2 lb 8 oz (1.1 kg) in weight, each pin nearly matching the maximum weight of a candlepin ball. They are nearly cylindrical in shape with a slight taper toward either end, making them vaguely resemble candles (hence the name). Unlike other bowling pins, because they are vertically symmetrical, candlepins may be set on either end. Due to their width and construction, candlepins tends to produce a billiard ball-like sound when struck.

== Kegels ==
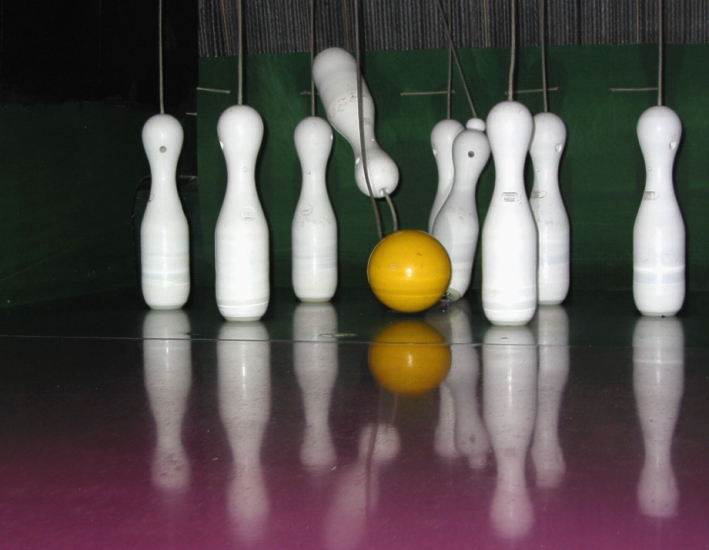
Kegel pins that are tethered to a pinsetter

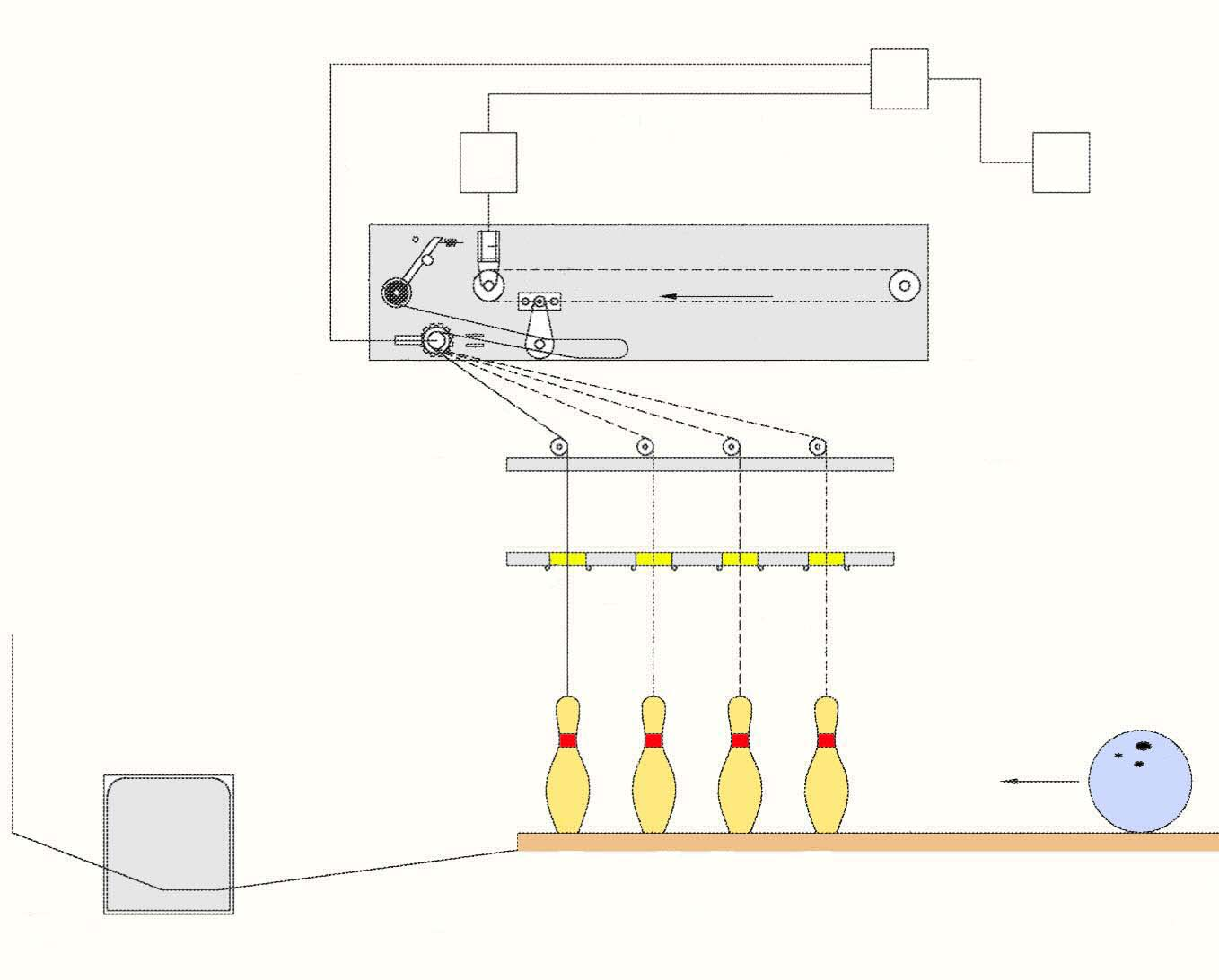
In 2023, the USBC began certifying string pinsetters, which are being installed in a growing number of tenpin bowling centers because of their reduced cost and maintenance requirements.

Pins used in the German bowling game kegel appears to combine the design of tenpins and duckpins. The overall shape of the pin resembles a standard tenpin bowling pins, and its small size is comparable to duckpins. Similar to five-pin bowling, these pins have strings attached on top of each, which connects them to the pinsetter.

== Pin construction ==
Bowling pins are constructed by gluing blocks of rock maple wood into the approximate shape, and then turning on a lathe. After the lathe shapes the pin, it is coated with a plastic material, painted, and covered with a glossy finish. Because of the scarcity of suitable wood, bowling pins can be made from approved synthetics. Currently there are synthetic pins sanctioned for play in five-pin, duckpin, and candlepin. There is one synthetic ten pin model approved by the USBC. When hit by the ball, synthetic pins usually sound different from wooden pins.

Juggling clubs could be mistaken for bowling pins due to their similar shape. The two differ greatly in construction and weight.

== See also ==
- Bowling pin shooting
- Tenpin bowling
- Nine-pin bowling
- Candlepin bowling
- Duckpin bowling
- Five-pin bowling
