= String bowling =

Type of pin bowling

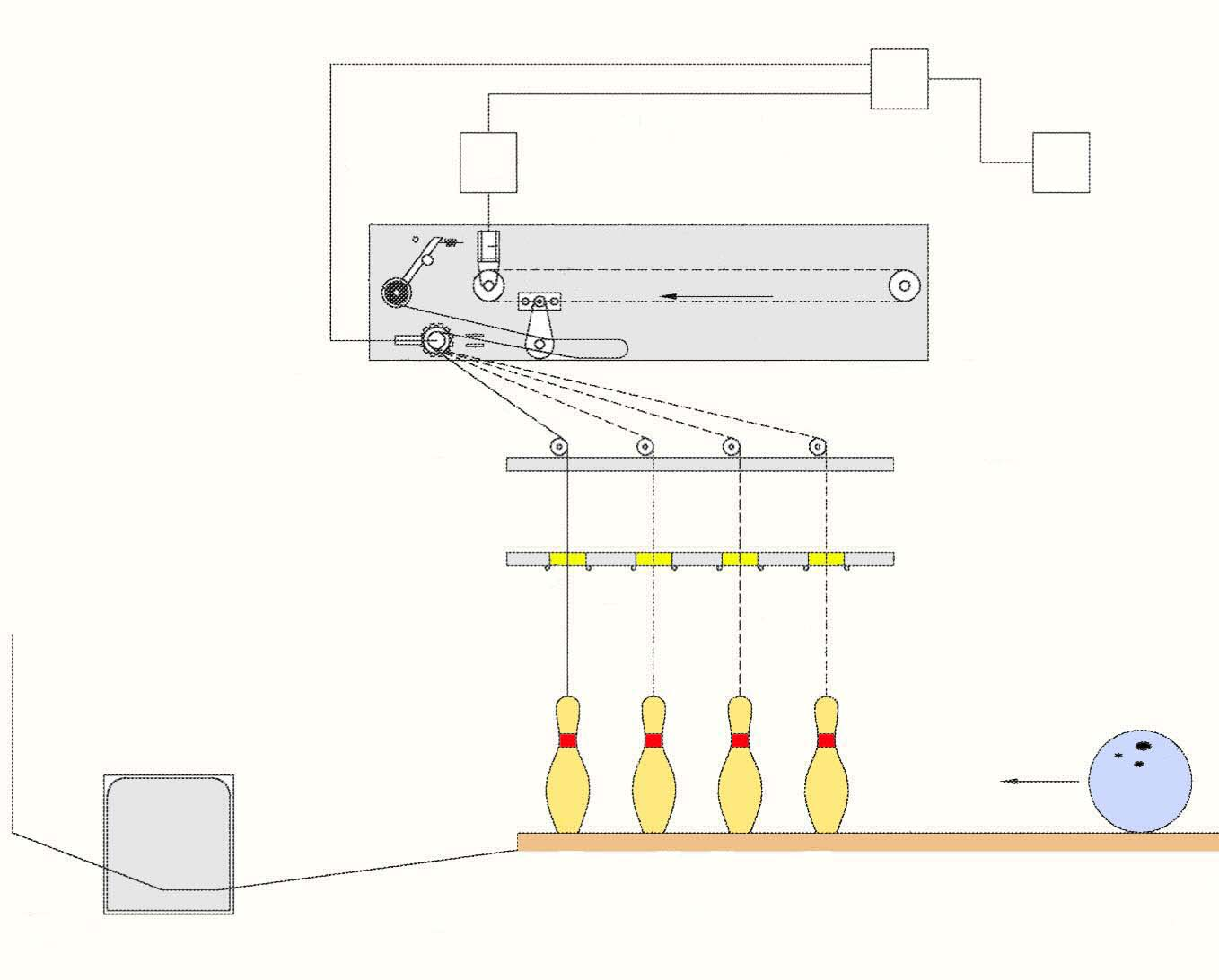
1) Ball approaches pins that strings have lowered into place.

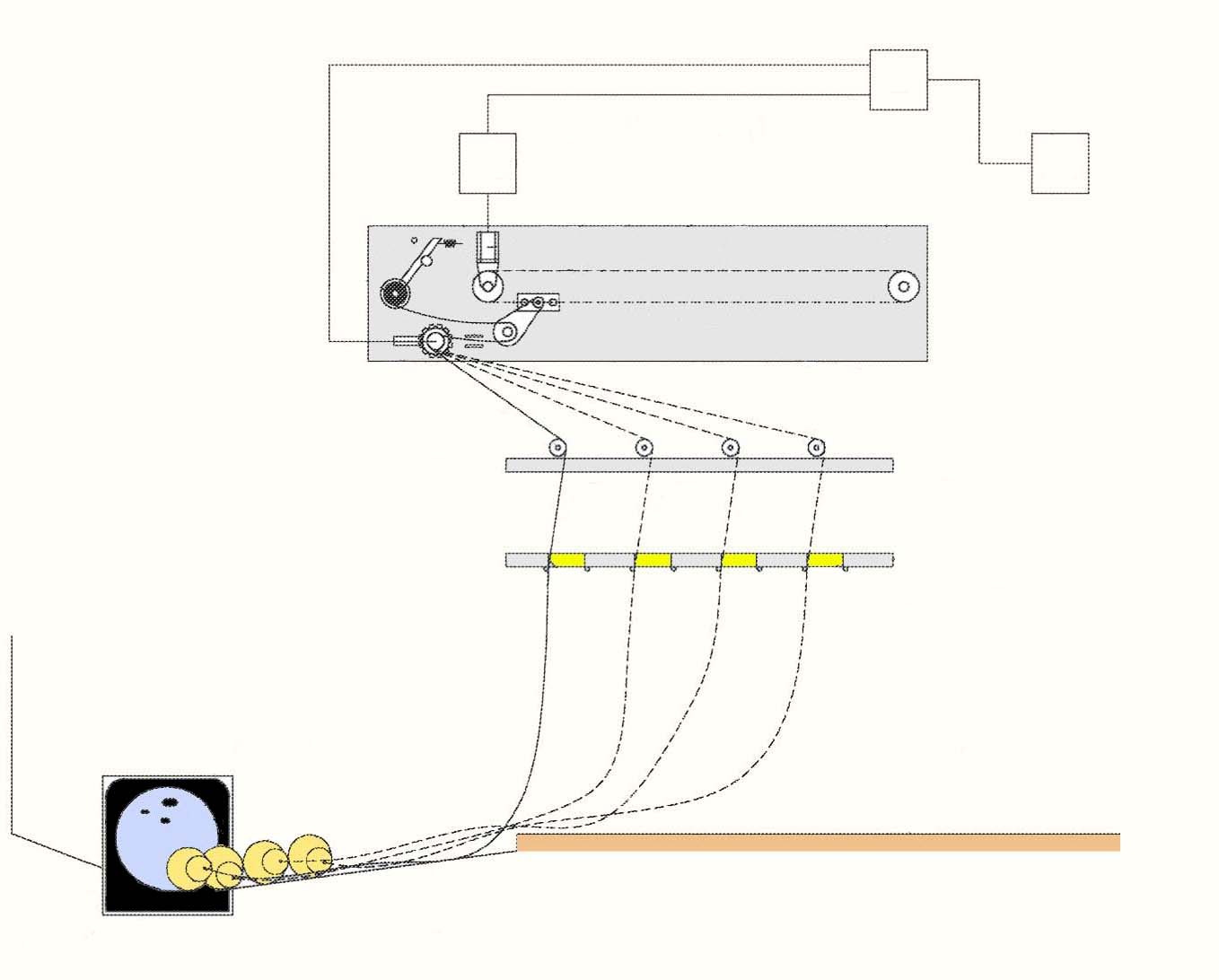
2) Ball knocks pins down before exiting to a ball return mechanism.

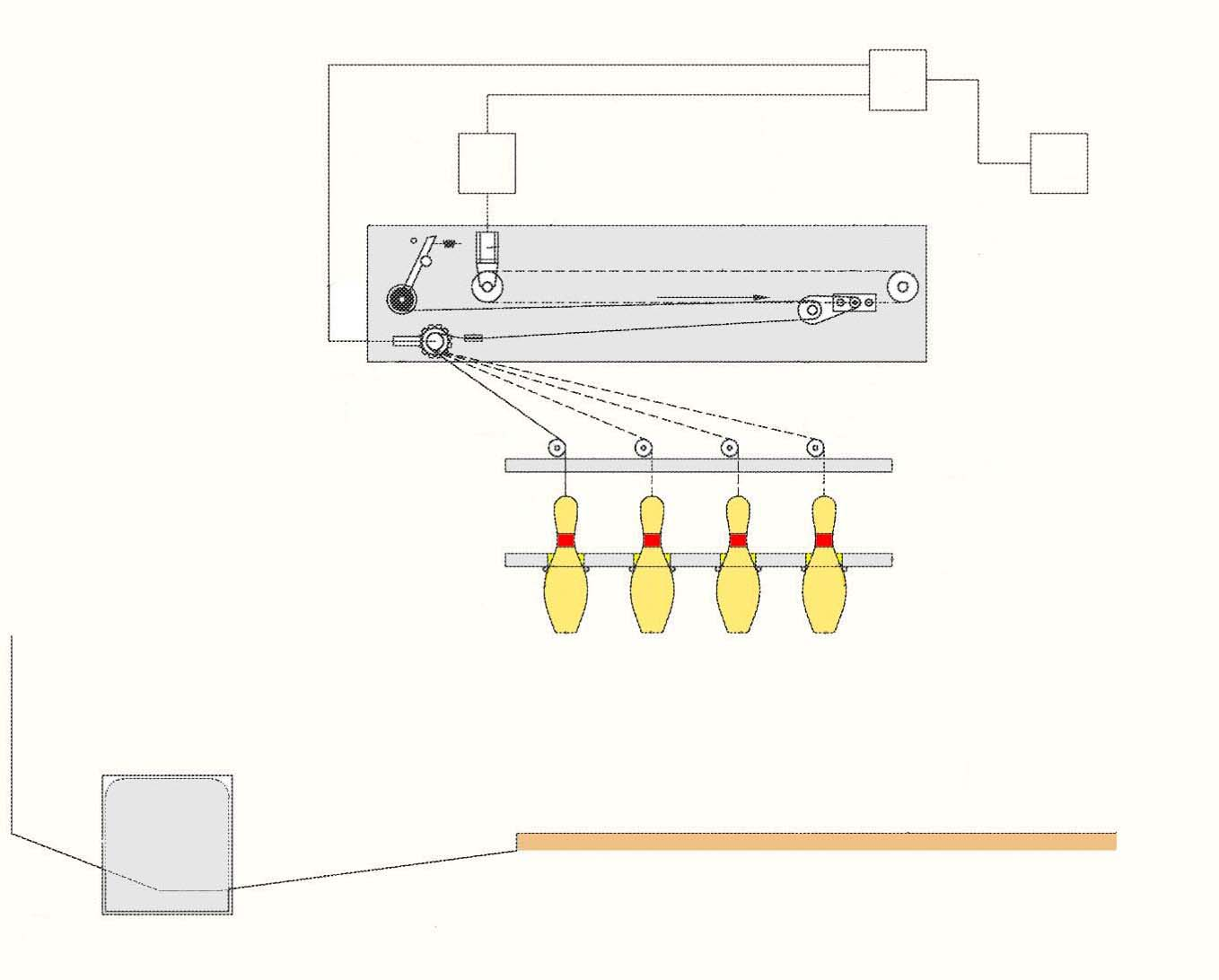
3) Strings retract the pins so they can be lowered into place.

String bowling (sometimes called string pin bowling) is a category of bowling in which the bowling pins are tethered to a pinsetter by cords that retract the pins after a roll.

String pinsetters (SPs) are distinguished from traditional stringless freefall pinsetters (FFPs) that have a more complex mechanism for gathering pins, sequentially lifting them, and then depositing them into a rack for lowering. Bowling centers are increasingly installing string pinsetters as they are less expensive and are more economical to maintain.

== Background ==
Historical background

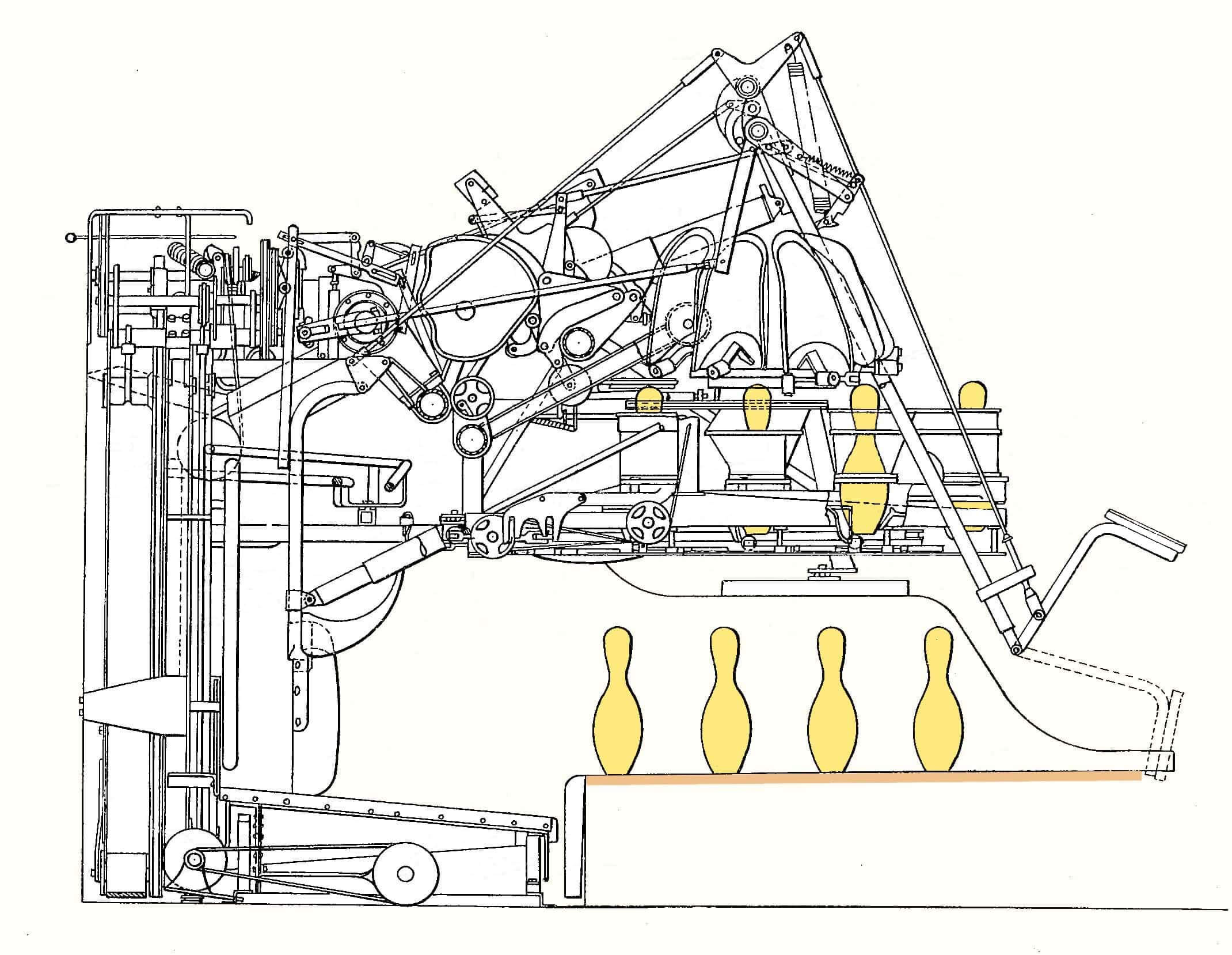
Conventional freefall pinsetters (FFPs) must preassemble a second set of ten pins above the deck to prepare for the next frame.

The USBC's 2023 certification of string pinsetters came amid a long decline in league membership, motivating use of less expensive machines.

An early (2021) USBC study found measurable differences in strike percentages between string pinsetters and freefall pinsetters.

A 2023 USBC study concluded that there was no statistically significant difference in the scoring pace in SPs versus FFPs.

At least as early as the 1850s, inventors recognized the advantage of using tethered pins to avoid the need for humans ("pinboys") to reset the pins. Early designs allowed the bowler to remotely reset fallen pins via a long cord connected to ten cords directly attached to the tops of individual pins. Others conceived attaching cords to the pins' bottoms to enable remote resetting. By at least the 1960s, it was recognized that specific pins fallen on the first roll should be lifted but not replaced until after the second roll, allowing spare shots to proceed without deadwood.

Modern freefall pinsetters (FFPs) that were developed after World War II are complex mechanisms that use large amounts of electricity, have expensive replacement parts, and require full-time mechanics in attendance. For a time, the popularity of the sport made costs manageable, but most of the 11,500 US bowling alleys in the 1960s have closed, leaving about 3,000 by the mid-2020s. The COVID-19 pandemic had brought lockdowns after declining popularity and rising costs.

Found especially in Germany, ninepin bowling (Kegeln) is played with nine tethered pins. European bowling alleys have used string pinsetters (SPs) for decades, and SPs were approved in November 2020 by the International Bowling Federation for IBF competition. The USBC immediately "affirmed" that string pinsetters may not be used in USBC-certified leagues and tournaments, pending development of empirical data from objective research. Though modern string pinsetter US patents have been issued at least as early as the 1960s, they faced a stigma in the US as being "gimmicky".

An early (2020–2021) United States Bowling Congress (USBC) study of 86,000 shots found that pinfall counts for string pinsetters (SPs) were statistically and significantly different than for freefall pinsetters (FFPs). Specifically, SPs were found to have strikes less frequently and counts of eight or lower more frequently than FFPs. The strike percentage with SPs was 7.1% lower than with FFPs, possibly reducing averages as much as 10 pins or more. Accordingly, the USBC concluded that a certification for string pinsetters to be used alongside freefall machines "would not be reasonable at this current time" (2021), pending "significant changes" being made to SPs. These measurements caused the USBC to plan additional testing to determine whether a scoring conversion should be created between bowling categories.

Effective 1 August 2023, the USBC certified tenpin string pinsetters and string pin bowling as an independent category of equipment and competition.

A USBC controlled study published in November 2023 concluded that there was no statistically significant difference in the scoring pace in SPs versus FFPs. Accordingly, the USBC stated that average adjustment between SPs and FFPs was not needed, and would allow for the averages between the pinsetter types to be interchangeable. Scores from either type would be used to calculate handicaps for competitions, but for reporting purposes, scores are marked as being SP or FFP to allow further USBC monitoring.

By November 2025, about 100 of 3500 US bowling centers had installed USBC-certified string pinsetters. By August 2026, there were twelve certified SP designs from eleven manufacturers.

== Characteristics ==
- External video
- YouTube short: String pinsetter operation

String pins exhibit a relatively muted sound compared to freefall pins, and a partition conceals the process of clearing and resetting pins. Some string pinsetters (SPs) have 75 working parts, significantly fewer than freefall pinsetters (FFPs). Unlike FFPs, when a standing pin has been moved off-spot, SPs reset the pin back on-spot. To ensure pin action, manufacturers recommend that the 1-, 2- and 3-pins be rotated to other positions to avoid being the pins that balls impact most. SPs' elimination of deadwood and out-of-range issues avoids the need for a full-time mechanic. Tangled strings are untangled either automatically or by an on-site employee who need not be a mechanic. A 2024 Professional Bowlers Association (PBA) study found only five re-racks in over 1,350 games, suggesting improved speed of play over FFPs.

A 2025 USBC review of 2023- and 2024- seasons found that the scoring deficit using string pinsetters versus freefall pinsetters was larger for higher-average bowlers.

In the 2021 USBC study, SP strike and/or spare conversion percentages varied with string length, string tightness, string type, pit dimensions, and manufacturer. In a scenario called "string assist", it is possible for the string of one pin to contact the string of another, converting a spare that would not have occurred with freefall pins. A 2024 study by the PBA found that the strike percentage on a QubicaAMF Edge SP was 48.52% compared to 57.62% on FFPs, with higher rev-rate players noting fewer "messenger" pins on string machines.

A USBC review of league scores in the 2023-2024 and 2024-2025 seasons found SP averages were 3.4 pins lower than with FFPs; bowlers averaging over 210 experienced a seven-pin decrease—equivalent to about two less strikes per three-game set. Researchers explained this average-dependent deficit as being due to the SPs' reduced pin scatter when the pocket is hit, recognizing that higher-average bowlers hit the pocket more often than lower-average bowlers.

The 2023 USBC specification requires a minimum string length of 54 inches to be certified. This length was chosen to simulate freefall pin action, while minimizing tangles that would cause equipment breakdowns. A separate "recreational mode" with shorter strings (46 inches) was found to result in more unique pinfall scenarios.

The pit depth specification is the same for SPs and FFPs (4.75" minimum), but the minimum distance from lane to the rear ball cushion is 35 inches—larger than the 25-inch minimum when FFPs are used.

== Critical response ==
String pinsetters are less expensive and are more economical to maintain, motivating bowling centers to phase them in.

Among longtime bowlers, the changeover is controversial as the sound and pin action are different. In a 2024 PBA study, 68% of participating PBA bowlers said that achieving strikes was more challenging on SPs. The PBA concluded that players need to adjust to differences in pin action, but 91% of bowlers said they would be willing to compete in PBA events on USBC-certified string pinsetters.

More Perfect Union cited string pinsetters and industry consolidation as contributing to the decline in quality of the bowling experience in the United States.

== See also ==
- Glossary of bowling
- Kegel (nine-pin bowling)
- Pinsetter
