= Bowling pin shooting =

Type of shooting sport

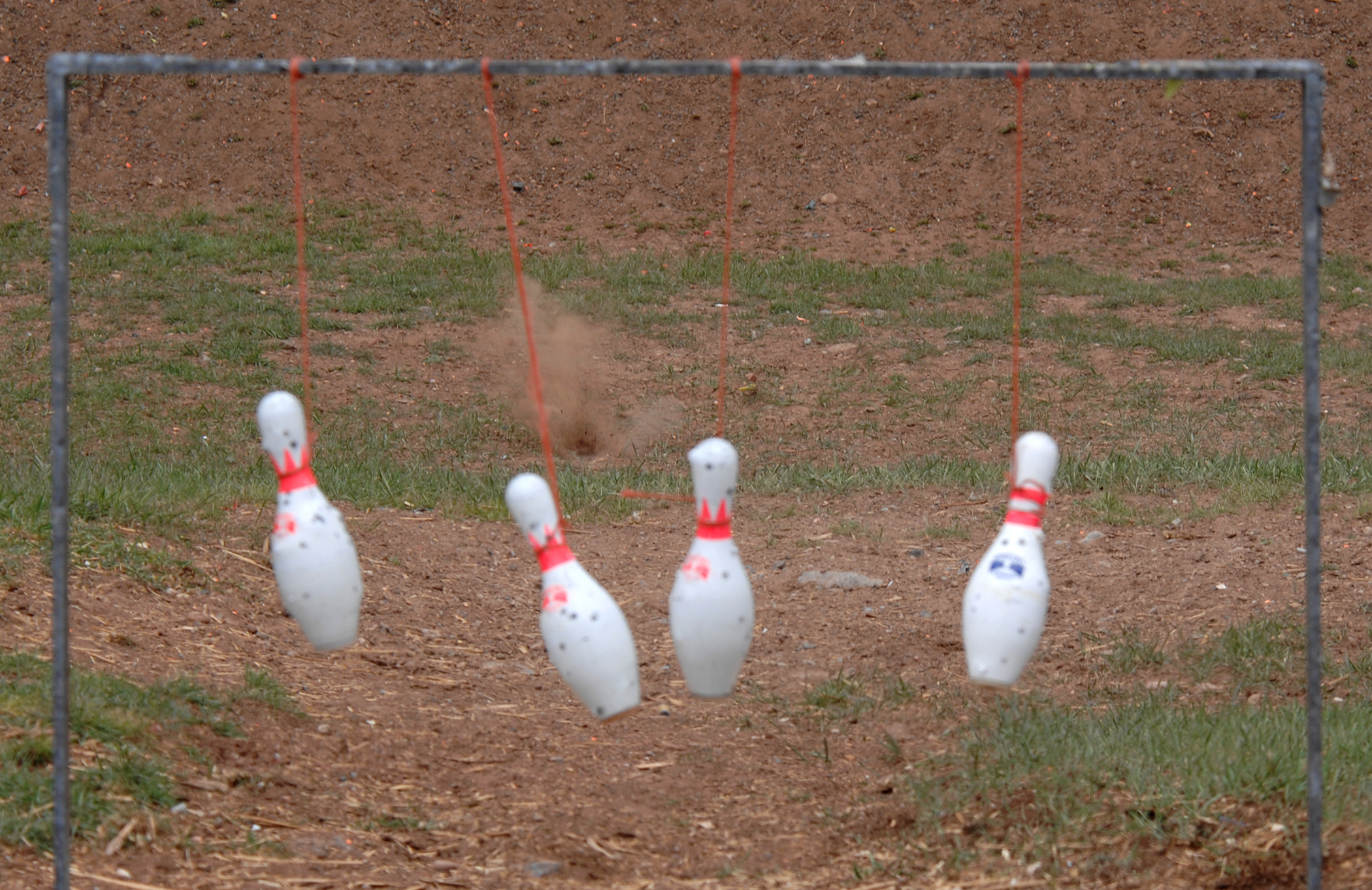
Target practice on bowling pins.

Bowling pin shooting is a shooting sport (primarily for handguns) in which the competitors race against one another to knock standard bowling pins from a table in the shortest elapsed time. Pin shooting is often described as one of the most enjoyable shooting games and one of the easiest means of introducing a new shooter into regular competitive shooting. Pin shooting appeals to both genders. There are many female pin shooters and many distinguished female pin shooters.

== History ==
Massad Ayoob credits the origin of bowling pin shooting with Richard Davis in the mid-1970s. The sport peaked in popularity between the mid-1980s and the late 1990s.

== Rules ==
Depending on the caliber of handgun used and the table employed, the pins must be knocked backwards up to 0.9 metres (3 ft) to be knocked clear of the table and onto the ground. The pin shooting tables typically consist of one of the following varieties:

1. 3 pins placed on a waist high table, with 2 additional pins placed on a second tier over the others at each end, forming a crude "U."
2. 5 pins placed on a flat 1.2 m × 2.4 m (4 ft × 8 ft) table, with the pins being placed 0.9 m (3 ft) from the back edge, or 0.3 m (1 ft) rear of the front edge.

Targets used can vary, but are usually tenpin bowling pins. Steel targets or electronic targets are also sometimes used.

Pin shooting is conducted with both revolvers and semi-automatic pistols in calibers ranging from .22 Long Rifle to .500 S&W Magnum, among many others. Bowling pin competition is often recognized to be a big-bore event in which large caliber or high-power handguns such as the .38 Super, .357 Magnum, 10mm Auto, .41 Magnum, .44 Magnum, .45 ACP, and .45 Colt. Other large-bore handguns have the greatest advantage in removing the pins from the table. Frequently, no allowance is made for shooters who shoot lower-power handguns, though some range officers may permit the distance to the back of the table be reduced to 0.6 m (2 ft) for "minor" calibers like 9mm Luger and .38 Special so that these "minor" calibers can approximate head-to-head equivalency with "major" calibers. While handloaded ammunition is regularly employed among pin shooters, it is considered a serious breach of etiquette and sportsmanship for a shooter of a "minor" caliber to handload "minor" ammunition to levels approaching "major" calibers, thus taking unfair advantage of a rule intended to allow novice shooters to participate. Shooters who shoot "hot" "minor" ammunition should declare such to the range officer and shoot targets from the regular pin placement.

Some ranges conduct centerfire handgun competition based on class. When classes are employed, three classes often are recognized: revolver, stock, and pin gun. Magazine capacity may be limited to 8 rounds in most competitions in which magazine-fed guns compete only against magazine-fed guns. In events where revolvers compete with magazine-fed guns, magazines are restricted to seven shots, out of respect for the customary six-shot revolver cylinder. The "pin gun class" is for highly advanced, often very expensive "race guns" in which almost all manner of enhancement is allowed, including optical sights (generally red dot sights) and compensators. The pins are placed far enough away from each other that they are unlikely to interact when hit, so a separate shot is needed to down each pin. The broad spacing and different levels make it challenging to move from target to target. Indirect hits will result in pins lying on their sides on the table in a situation known as "deadwood," where multiple shots may be required to clear the pin from the table. "Deadwood" is further complicated in that one deadwood pin may be lying next to another deadwood pin, interfering with a clear path to knocking either deadwood pin from the table.

Generally, .22 Long Rifle competitions shoot the tops of the pins, known as "pin-tops," which are lighter and more easily knocked down by the light, comparatively low energy bullets. Occasionally, a .22 match may be shot by placing pins at the very back of the table so that the comparatively light .22 hit will still knock the pin off the table. Some matches are also shot with a semi-automatic or pump-action shotgun, usually firing buckshot. As shotgun rounds quickly disintegrate the pins, such matches are customarily reserved for the end of a match, when a supply of pins unfit for handgun matches may be put to final utility. There are even less common types of matches that allow carbines or submachine guns.

== Types of competition ==
Bracket-style: "Bracket-style" is shot in pairs of shooters. Each shooter will have his or her own table of pins, and the winner of the round is the shooter whose entire obligation of pins hits the ground first. Pins that are merely in flight do not count until they hit the ground. It is similar to the NCAA Men's Division I Basketball Championship, in which shooters are paired against one another, with the round winner advancing to the next level, until an overall match winner is determined. Matches conducted along such lines are tremendously exciting, as a top shooter may fumble, pause or have a momentary equipment failure, allowing a lesser shooter to claim the round. "Bracket-style" competitions often contain a concurrent "losers' bracket," where the losers in the "winners' bracket" compete for a lesser bracket win. "Bracket style" has sometimes been referred to as a "gun drag race".

Timed: Some ranges conduct matches in a timed format, where a shooter clears three tables in an observed time, and the averages of the three tables are computed in a simple mean. The shooter with the overall fastest average wins the match.

King of the Hill: Two shooters conduct a round. The winner shoots against a new shooter, though a sixth pin is added to the winner's table, while the challenger shoots the regular five pins. If the winner takes the subsequent round, a seventh pin is added to the winner's table, until such time as a challenger will be able to clear five pins than the King's ever-growing allotment. When the King of the Hill is beaten, the challenger becomes the new King, and a sixth pin is added, and the round continues until the participants arrive at a stopping point. Magazine restrictions are typically removed for King of the Hill matches.

== The pins ==
Bowling pins are often discarded by bowling alleys after a certain amount of use, at which time pin shooters collect them for use in pin shooting. Modern plastic coated bowling pins are very resilient, and can absorb many rounds before becoming too splintered or unbalanced to function as targets. Generally pins start out as targets for the centerfire handguns, then when they start to disintegrate they are saved for use as shotgun targets.

At the start of the event, or when a fresh pin is introduced, a smaller-caliber handgun may be able to remove a pin with comparable authority as a large-bore handgun. As rounds are shot, however, the pins will add weight, as the pins become filled with lead bullets. When the pins add weight, smaller-caliber handguns suffer a great disadvantage, as the smaller round loses ability to move the pin, while the large-bore guns are easily able to clear a bullet-laden pin from the table with speed.

Pins that will no longer stand on their bases have their heads sawed off down to become rimfire targets for the .22 match, where the "pin tops" are engaged by the shooter. Given the very light weight of the "pin top," the .22 is quite capable of removing the target from the table with a single well-placed shot.

== The goal of pin shooting ==
Pin shooting is competitive, practical shooting that sharpens one’s handgun skills under time pressure.
