= Holler House =

US's oldest sanctioned tenpin bowling alley

Coordinates: 43.0034°N 87.9396°W

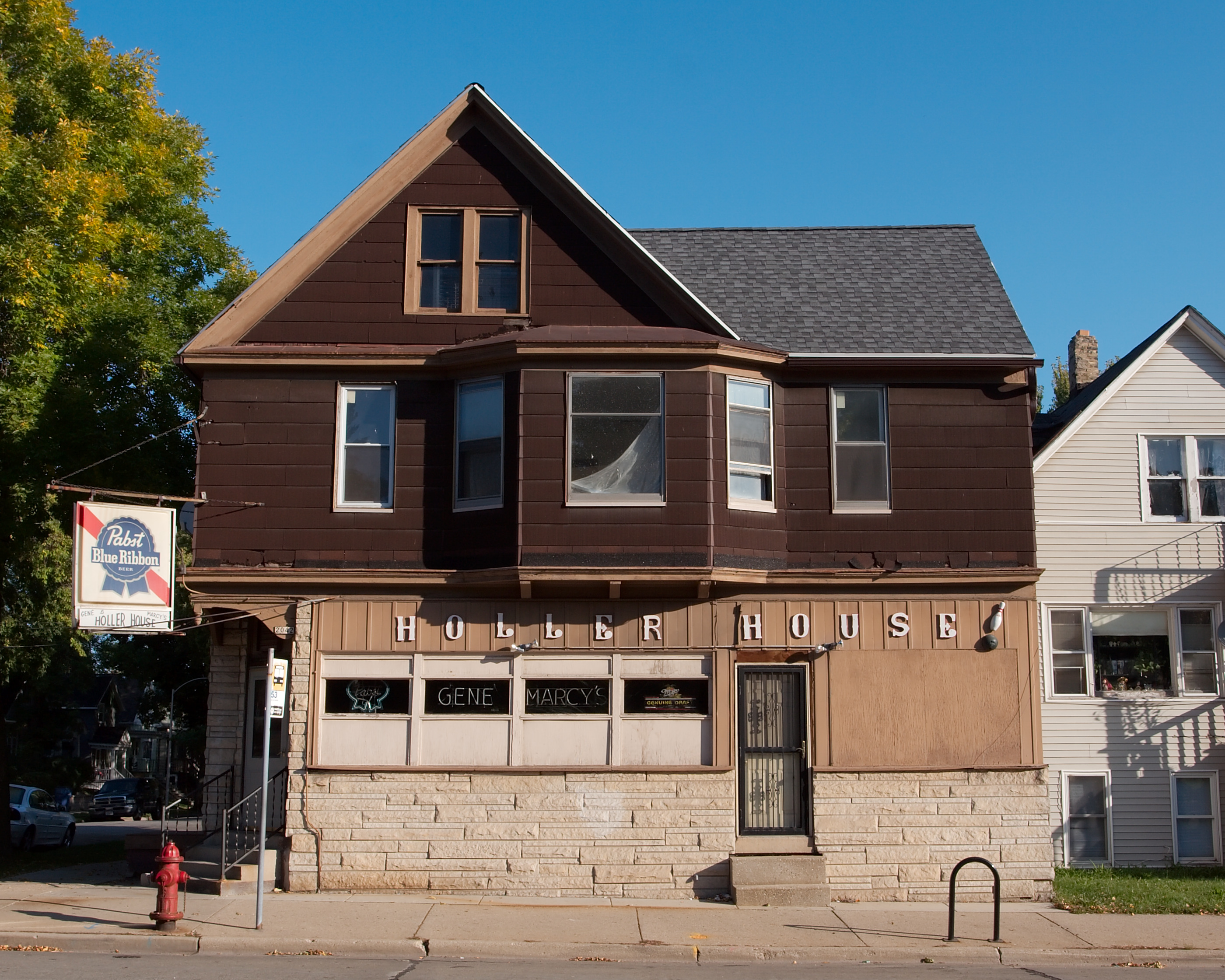
- Sport: Ten-pin bowling
- Founded: 1908
- Location: 2042 W. Lincoln Ave. Milwaukee, Wisconsin, United States
- Chairman: Marcy Skowronski

Official website
- www.geneandmarcyhollerhouse.com
- (United States)

Holler House is a tavern that houses the oldest sanctioned tenpin bowling alley in the United States. It contains the two oldest sanctioned lanes in the nation, which are still tended by human pinsetters.

It was opened in the Lincoln Village neighborhood of Milwaukee, Wisconsin, in 1908. Its 100th anniversary party was held on Saturday, September 14, 2008. Esquire has rated it one of the best bars in America.

== History ==
Holler House was founded on September 13, 1908, by "Iron Mike" Skoronski as Skowronski's. His son, Gene, married Marcy in 1952 and they renamed it Gene and Marcy's. After Gene died in 1990, Marcy Skowronski ran the tavern until her death in December 2019. Her family continues the business.

== Tradition ==
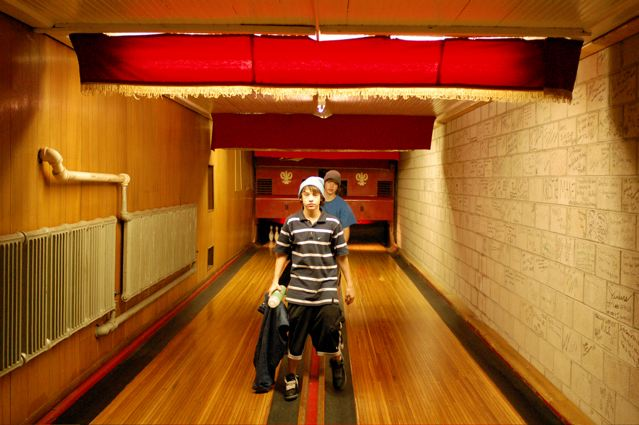
Pinboys at Holler House bowling alley

Starting in the mid-twentieth century, Holler House began a tradition that has since accumulated nearly 1,000 bras. This tradition started when the owner Marcy Skowronski was drinking with her friends, after which they started taking their clothes off. This has now grown into a tradition in which women autograph and hang their bras from various fixtures in the tavern on their first visit. When the bras started fraying, Skowronski boxed up most of them to make room for new ones to be displayed.

== 100th anniversary ==
In preparation for its 100th anniversary, Holler House received its first thorough cleaning in 40 years. During this cleaning, five two-hole 15-pound wooden bowling balls were found.

== Original vintage appearance ==
Holler House still looks much the same as it did a century ago. The lanes are of real wood laid over a century ago, not the synthetic wood found in modern bowling alleys. It still has a manual pin-spotting mechanism on each lane, and pin boys return bowlers' balls by rolling them down a traditional "overlane" return-track between the two lanes. Game scores are recorded on paper hanging on the wall.

== Memorabilia and the beer sold ==
Memorabilia dating back to as early as 1912 is displayed. Prices in the early days were 25 cents for a hot beef sandwich and 25 cents plus deposit for a half-gallon of beer. During Prohibition, liquor was stored under a baby's crib on the assumption the police would not look there. There are no chairs in the bowling alley. Reflecting the ethnic background of the neighborhood, there are Polish eagle crests above the bowling lanes.

Holler House sells only bottled beer, with the exception of Schlitz in a can. There is nothing on tap.

== Notable bowlers and visitors ==
- Earl Anthony, a professional bowler, who amassed a total of 43 titles on the Professional Bowlers Association (PBA) Tour
- Joe Walsh, an American guitarist
- Traci Lords, an American film actress
- Frank Deford, a Sports Illustrated author
- Larry the Cable Guy, comedian
- Jack White, musician
- Beach House, music duo
- Parker Bohn III, Pro-Bowler
- Pee-wee Herman, American comedian
