= Bowlmor Lanes =

Upscale bowling brand operated by Lucky Strike Entertainment Corporation

- Type: Division
- Industry: Bowling
- Founded: 1938; 88 years ago
- Founder: Nick Gianos
- Headquarters: Mechanicsville, Virginia, U.S.
- Number of locations: 1 (2025)
- Website: www.bowlmor.com

Bowlmor Lanes is an upscale brand of ten-pin bowling and entertainment centers operated by Lucky Strike Entertainment Corporation. As of 2026, one center in Cupertino, California, uses the Bowlmor Lanes branding.

== Early history ==
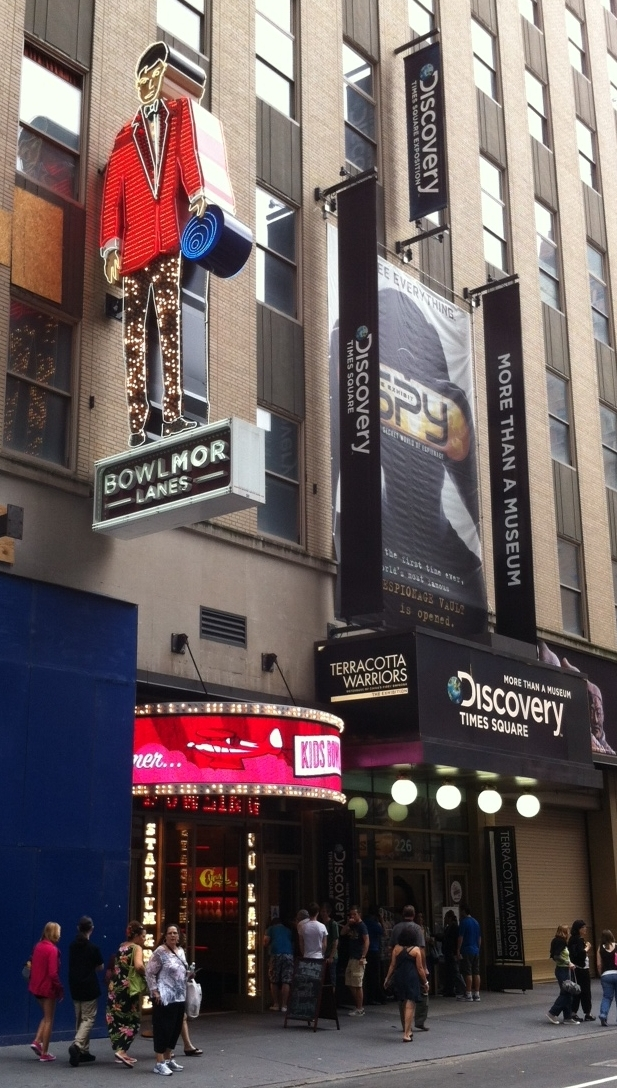
Bowlmor Lanes Times Square

In 1938, Nick Gianos opened the original Bowlmor Lanes in New York City's Union Square. The opening came right at the start of the Golden Age of bowling, the 1940s through the 1960s, when the invention of the automatic pinsetter propelled bowling's popularity to its highest. Bowlmor Lanes was at the forefront of the bowling revolution, hosting the prestigious Landgraf Tournament in 1942 and one of the first televised bowling tournaments, the East vs. West, broadcast on New York City radio station WOR in 1954. In 1958, Vice President Richard Nixon bowled at the center. Through the 70's and 80's Bowlmor Lanes was home to the top bowlers in the sport.

Nick Gianos's son John took over the business in 1981, and by 1997 he was feeling the pressure of rising rent and the need to modernize.

That year, 1992 Darden School of Business graduate Tom Shannon attended a birthday party at the now dilapidated bowling center. Shannon saw the potential in the property and purchased it for $1.4 million "to inject the tired business with hip design, upscale cuisine, and a full bar, and then market Bowlmor as a party venue."

Shannon then borrowed $2 million from friends, family, and Bowlmor's sellers to transform the center. Changes included installation of video screens, glow in the dark lanes and balls, and lane-side food and drink service. Shannon eliminated bowling leagues, "to ease out those who did not cotton to the fancy trappings or higher prices," in favor of promotions and events aimed at attracting new fans to the sport. By 1999, Bowlmor Lanes Union Square was the highest-grossing bowling center in the United States. The center was closed in July 2014 when it lost its lease.

== More locations ==
With the success of the Union Square location, Shannon’s company, Strike Holdings LLC, went on to replicate the Bowlmor Lanes concept in other markets. In 2001, Strike Bethesda opened in suburban Washington, D.C. A year later, Strike Long Island was opened in an underground space housing 35 lanes of bowling, a full-service restaurant, and four bars. In November 2004, the 34 lane Strike Miami opened in the Dolphin Mall in the Doral section of the city, featuring a sports themed restaurant. Strike Cupertino (Silicon Valley), California opened at Vallco Shopping Mall in the summer of 2007 and Strike Orange County, CA opened in the summer of 2008. The properties were rebranded as Bowlmor Lanes soon after.

In December 2004, Shannon said his company was severing ties with a group tied to the late Palestinian leader Yasser Arafat and was returning its $1.3 million investment.

In the fall of 2010, Strike Holdings opened its largest location in the former New York Times newsroom in New York City's Times Square. The 90,000-square-foot (8,400 m^{2}) Bowlmor Lanes facility features seven bowling lounges designed with New York themes, from Manhattan Chinatown (featuring a gong that is hit upon bowling a strike) to Art Deco and Central Park (including items purchased from the Tavern on the Green auction) to Prohibition, plus a full stage with dance floor, a sports bar with stadium-style seating, boardwalk games, and a miniature golf course.

In August 2010, five ex-employees of Bowlmor Lanes location in Manhattan's Union Square sued Shannon claiming they were dismissed because of discrimination. They also alleged that Shannon used networking sites Facebook and MySpace to screen out minorities and others he felt weren't desirable for his club.

== Operations ==
Bowlmor Lanes centers aim to provide "high-end" bowling in a modern lounge setting which includes audiovisual technology, such as plasma screens for automatic scoring and movie screens above the lanes, plus glow lighting, and glow-in-the-dark lanes. Bowlmor Lanes centers also have DJ booths, sports bars and video arcades, miniature golf, bocce, table shuffleboard, ping pong tables, air hockey, billiards, and boardwalk games, private party facilities with catering services, and full-service restaurants. Bowlero claims its Bowlmor Lanes brand has a 35-50% return on equity.

Bowlmor's revenues rose from approximately $1.9 million from its single facility in the year ending December 31, 1997 (close to double the revenues for the same facility in the prior year under previous management) to approximately $37.1 million for all locations in the year ending December 31, 2012. Bowlmor locations have earned several hundred thousand dollars per lane per year making it one of the highest grossing bowling facility operators in North America.

In 2013, Strike Holdings merged the much larger AMF Bowling Worldwide to form Bowlmor AMF with Tom Shannon as its Chairman, Chief Executive Officer, and President. Bowlmor AMF was renamed Bowlero Corporation in 2018. Following the company's 2023 acquisition of Lucky Strike Lanes, which like Bowlmor is positioned as an upscale brand, the company renamed itself Lucky Strike Entertainment Corporation and began to phase out the Bowlmor brand in favor of the Lucky Strike brand. As of 2026, only the Cupertino, California, location retains the Bowlmor name.

== Accolades ==
Shannon was named Bowling Proprietor of the Year in 2001 and again in 2014 by Bowlers Journal International Magazine and a Top Entrepreneur of 2008 by Crain's New York Business.
