= Hollywood Bowl Group =

UK and Canada bowling and minigolf centre operator

Hollywood Bowl Group plc

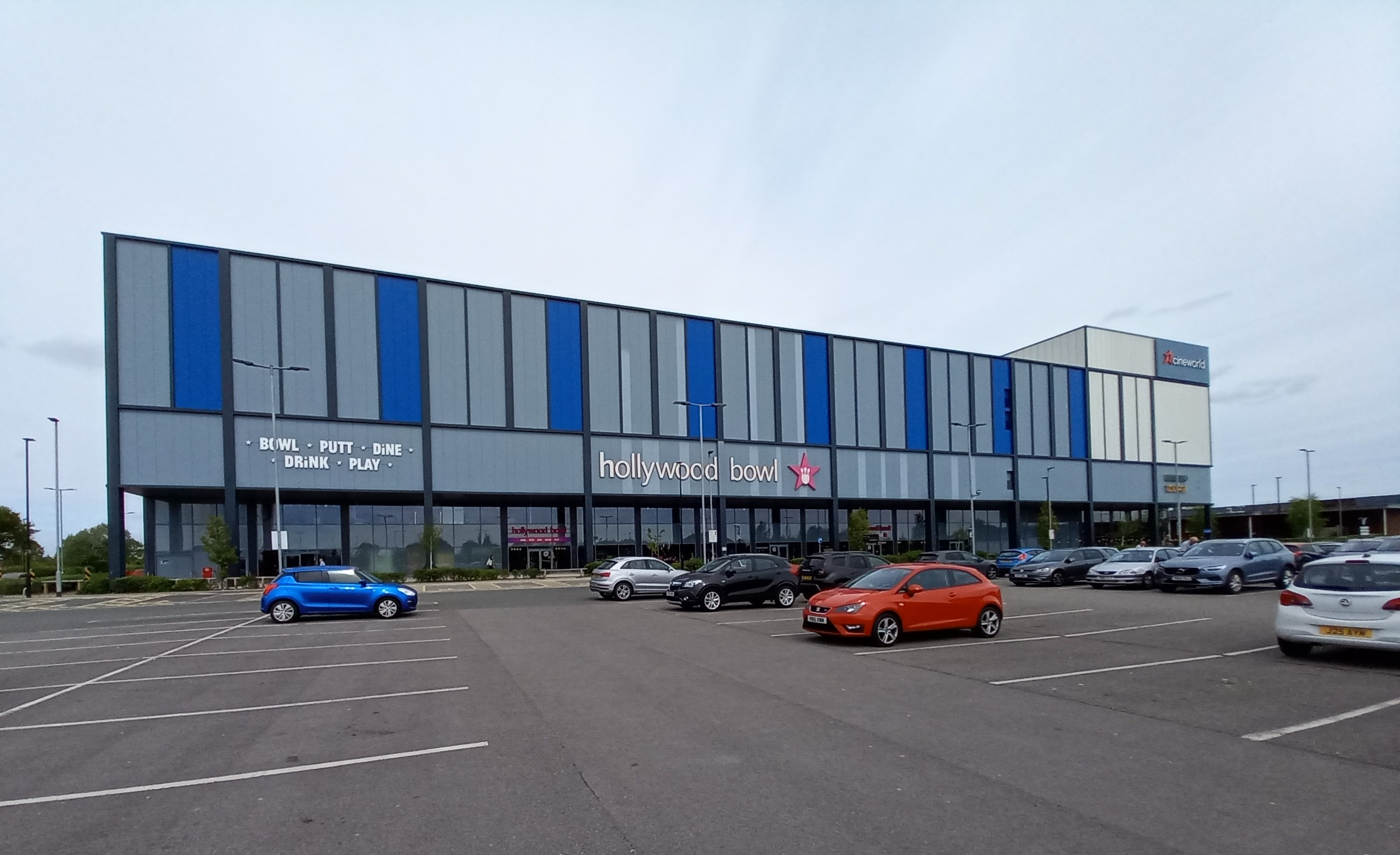
- Exterior of a Hollywood Bowl location in Huntington, North Yorkshire.
- Type: Public
- Traded as: LSE: BOWL
- Industry: Entertainment
- Founded: 1960; 66 years ago
- Founder: US company AMF Bowling
- Headquarters: Hemel Hempstead, United Kingdom
- Key people: Darren Shapland (Chairman); Stephen Burns (CEO)
- Revenue: ▲£250.7 million (2025)
- Operating income: ▼£59.4 million (2025)
- Net income: ▲£34.6 million (2025)
- Website: hollywoodbowlgroup.com

Hollywood Bowl Group plc (HBG) is a British leisure and family entertainment company. The company is the corporate successor to the British operations of AMF Bowling, which had originally been acquired by shareholders of Bourne Leisure in 2004, and acquired the Hollywood Lanes chain in 2010.

The company operates bowling alleys in the United Kingdom and Canada under the Hollywood Bowl and Splitsville brands respectively; all locations operate tenpin bowling alongside amenities such as licensed lounges and arcades, while three of the Canadian centres also offer five-pin bowling. It also operates miniature golf centres in the UK under the "Puttstars" brand.

HBG is listed on the London Stock Exchange and is a constituent of the FTSE 250 Index.

== History ==
=== Foundation as AMF Bowling UK ===
The United States company AMF Bowling opened its first centre in the United Kingdom in Stamford Hill, North London on 20 January 1960. Between 1967 and 1970, AMF Bowling UK acquired its first 15 centres. After Goldman Sachs purchased AMF Bowling in 1996, the number of centres owned and operated by AMF Bowling in the UK rose in 1997 from 15 to 37. The company then embarked on a program to refurbish the acquired centres.

Hollywood Bowl itself was established in 1985, with a site in Watford, independent from AMF Bowling UK at the time.

In 2004 certain shareholders of the British leisure conglomerate, Bourne Leisure, acquired the AMF-branded centres in the UK. AMF Bowling UK then embarked on another programme of refurbishment and since 2007 had opened five new centres in the UK.

=== The Original Bowling Company ===
In August 2010, AMF Bowling UK acquired the Hollywood Bowl business from Mitchells & Butlers PLC and combined the companies into The Original Bowling Company Ltd (TOBC), UK’s largest bowling centre operator. TOBC sold centres to 1st Bowl (now known as MFA Bowl) as part of the merger. In September 2014, Electra Private Equity acquired TOBC for £91 million.

In April 2015, TOBC announced its intention to purchase Bowlplex, subject to approval by the Competition and Markets Authority. Out of the Bowlplex sites, ten were retained by the company and rebranded as Hollywood Bowl, while six Bowlplex sites in Bristol, Camberley, Castleford, Dudley, Glasgow, and Nantgarw were sold to Tenpin Ltd for competition reasons.

=== Hollywood Bowl Group ===
In 2015, TOBC purchased rival Bowlplex. After its purchase of Bowlplex, TOBC rebranded as Hollywood Bowl Group (HBG), and began to unify all of its centres under the Hollywood Bowl banner. The last AMF-branded centre in Worthing was rebranded as Hollywood Bowl in 2023 after a £200,000 renovation.

In 2022, HBG expanded into the Canadian market by acquiring Teaquinn Holdings for £21 million (CA$34 million); the acquisition included five Splitsville bowling alleys and equipment distributor Striker Bowling Solutions. Following the acquisition, HBG retained Pat Haggerty as the president of its Canadian operations, and began to pursue further acquisitions and the construction of new centres under the Splitsville branding. By 2025 the chain had expanded to 15 locations across the country.

== Brands ==
=== Hollywood Bowl ===
Hollywood Bowl serves as the company's flagship banner in the United Kingdom; all of their bowling centres are equipped with at least 14 lanes, a licensed bar, a diner and an amusements zone with a variety of arcade games.

==== Putt & Play by Hollywood Bowl ====
Hollywood Bowl Group opened its first minigolf centre, previously named Puttstars at The Springs Retail Park, Leeds in March 2020.

=== Splitsville Bowl ===
Splitsville Bowl is the brand name that is used for the company's Canadian bowling centre operations; similarly to Hollywood Bowl, it is structured as a family entertainment centre concept, featuring bowling (including dedicated "VIP" lanes), a lounge and bar, and arcade and redemption games.
