= AMF Bowling =

Bowling center operator and equipment manufacturer

- Industry: Bowling
- Predecessor: American Machine and Foundry
- Fate: Assets sold off to other companies
- Successor: Lucky Strike Entertainment; Hollywood Bowl Group; QubicaAMF Worldwide; Zone Bowling Australia
- Products: Pinsetters, bowling pins, bowling balls, ball returns, lane surfaces, automatic scoring equipment, bowling center furniture
- Services: Bowling center management and operations

Logo used by newer Lucky Strike Entertainment-owned, AMF-branded bowling centers since 2013.

AMF Bowling (AMF Bowling Worldwide) was a major operator of bowling centers and major manufacturer of bowling equipment.

The AMF brand continues in use by the following companies:

- Lucky Strike Entertainment Corporation uses the name as one of its three brands for bowling centers in the United States and Mexico
- QubicaAMF Worldwide acquired the manufacturing operations of AMF, and continues to use the brand on bowling equipment.

== History ==
The American Machine and Foundry (known after 1970 as AMF, Inc.) moved into the bowling business after World War II, when AMF automated bowling equipment and bowling centers became profitable business ventures, and in subsequent years into many other manufacturing businesses. Aging production facilities and increasing quality control problems in some product lines caused sales declines in the late 1970s and early 1980s. The company's vast diversified output proved difficult to efficiently manage, and the company began to experience losses. Bowling remained quite profitable, however, so the company began a campaign of expansion in this area, spending nearly $100 million on acquisitions of bowling centers in 1984 and 1985. In 1985, corporate raider Irwin L. Jacobs's Minstar, Inc. bought AMF Inc. and began to sell its various business divisions.

Commonwealth Venture Partners, a group of private investors in Richmond, Virginia, paid $225 million in 1985 to purchase the bowling center and bowling products divisions, forming AMF Bowling Companies, Inc. (later known as AMF Bowling Worldwide). In 1996 Goldman Sachs paid $1.4 billion to buy the company from Commonwealth Ventures. AMF Bowling went public with its listing on the New York Stock Exchange in November 1997. In 1998 its stock price plummeted as losses mounted, so expansion plans were put on hold. In 1999 the decision was made to downsize. By 2000 the company was more than $1 billion in debt and was delisted.

AMF Bowling entered Chapter 11 bankruptcy for the first time in April 2001, stating that it had “overextended itself by acquiring 260 additional bowling centers that it had struggled to manage,” and that the demand for bowling products had decreased. Private equity firm Code Hennessy & Simmons bought the company in 2004 for $670 million to bring it out of bankruptcy. The transaction was financed in part by a $254 million sale and lease-back of 186 bowling centers to iStar Financial. Shortly after, the company began shedding its “non-core, foreign assets” to focus on improving the operations of its remaining centers. Fred Hipp, the former California Pizza Kitchen top executive who became president and CEO in 2004, said the strategy would now be to “bring as much focus as possible to the management of our core U.S. center and bowling products businesses." In 2005, AMF Bowling's products division and Italian-based Qubica Worldwide formed a 50/50 joint venture, QubicaAMF Worldwide.

AMF Bowling went into Chapter 11 bankruptcy for the second time in November 2012. In its filing the company cited the challenge of adjusting to “the marked shift in the average bowling customer”. In 2013, AMF Bowling was brought out of bankruptcy through its merger with Strike Holdings LLC (doing business as the bowling center operator Bowlmor Lanes), bringing all remaining bowling centers and the 50% interest in the QubicaAMF joint venture under the control of Bowlmor AMF (now known as Lucky Strike Entertainment). Bowlmor AMF sold its QubicaAMF joint venture interest to Qubica in 2014.

== Bowling centers ==
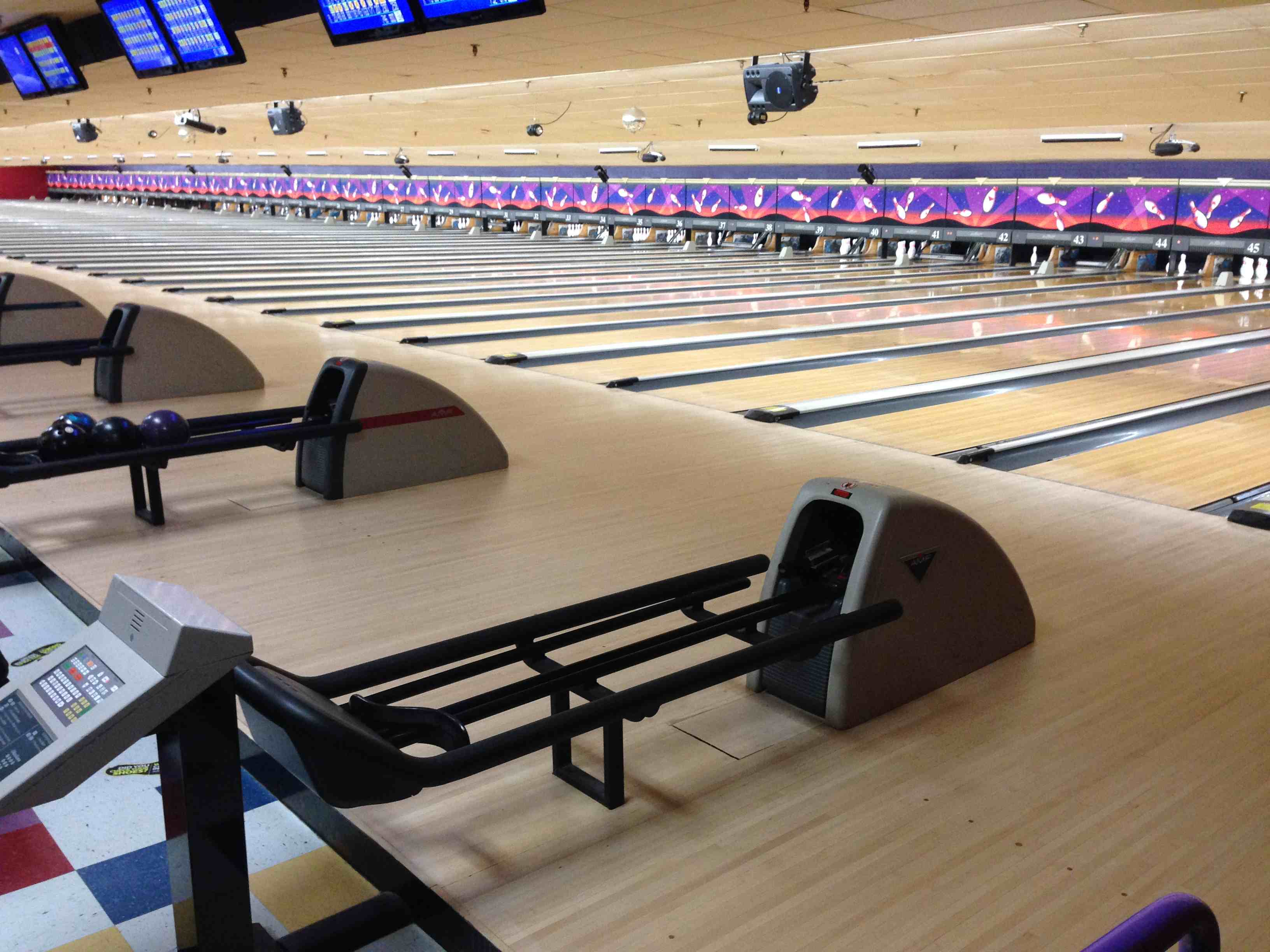
A typical US AMF-branded bowling center that uses AMF pinsetters

At the formation of AMF Bowling in 1986, Commonwealth Ventures acquired the 110 AMF-owned bowling centers in the United States and abroad, as well as the 22 centers owned by one of the partners in Commonwealth Ventures, Major League Bowling Corp. Commonwealth then spent nearly $500 million revitalizing the bowling center business with a focus on expanding the appeal of bowling to league and casual bowlers. In 1991 the company hired former PepsiCo executive Mark Willoughby to head the bowling center business. Willoughby set out to make AMF Bowling the “McDonald's of bowling”.

The company became the largest owner of bowling centers in the US in 1995 with the acquisition of Fair Lanes, which the year before had been through a leveraged buyout, filed for bankruptcy, and then emerged from it as it struggled to get the cash needed to renovate its centers. The addition of Fair Lanes's 106 bowling centers brought AMF Bowling's total to 205 centers in the US and 79 overseas.

When Goldman Sachs acquired the company in 1996, its strategy was to clean up purchased properties and create a national chain of amusement complexes. That year, the company bought Bowling Corporation of America from closely held Charan Industries, adding 50 more bowling centers. In that same year it purchased 43 centers from American Recreation Centers. In 1997, the company acquired 15 centers from Conbow Corporation. By the start of 1999, AMF Bowling operated 421 centers in the United States, 46 in Australia, 37 in the United Kingdom, and 41 in eight other countries.

After emerging from bankruptcy in 2005, the company sold its centers in Australia and the United Kingdom in 2004 and 2005.

When it entered bankruptcy for the second time in 2012, the company observed, “In the 1960s and 70s... the typical bowler was a blue collar factory worker who belonged to one or more bowling leagues. Today’s typical bowler comes from a broader swath of the middle-class, and is unlikely to bowl in a league. Non-league bowlers bowl less often. And when they do bowl, they expect nicer amenities – automatic scoring, a variety of food and beverage options, and more attractive facilities.” As evidence of the shift, the company noted that, “according to the United States Bowling Congress, in 1998 the nation’s three largest league bowling organizations had over 4.1 million members. Just a decade later, membership had declined by 36% to 2.6 million.” To respond to the change in the average bowling customer, AMF constructed nine upscale 300 Centers with “high-end bars and lounges designed with a modern décor” that drew “significant business through group events.” However, the Great Recession of 2008 eroded AMF's ability to maintain and enhance its 262 existing US bowling centers and meant that people were bowling less often. At the time of the bankruptcy filing, AMF owned 27 bowling centers, leased 186 bowling centers through agreements with iStar Financial, and leased 57 under agreements with various other parties.

The 2013 merger brought the remaining US and Mexico centers under the control of a new entity, Bowlmor AMF (now known as Lucky Strike Entertainment), making it the largest owner and operator of bowling centers in the United States. In the three years prior to the reorganization, AMF Bowling had closed nine owned US centers and 33 leased US centers due to "declining operating performance, unattractive options to renew leases, or an attractive sales opportunity". That left 257 AMF bowling centers in the United States and eight in Mexico passing to Bowlmor AMF at the time of the reorganization.

== Bowling equipment ==
The American Machine and Foundry Pinspotter, developed in 1951 and first marketed in 1952, was one of the first fully automated pinspotters used in quantity in the bowling industry. When Commonwealth Ventures acquired the bowling center and bowling equipment divisions of AMF, Inc. to form AMF Bowling in 1985, its new company was already a major manufacturer of pinspotters, bowling pins, bowling balls, ball returns, lane surfaces, automatic scoring equipment, and other bowling equipment.

In 2005, AMF Bowling's equipment division and Italian-based Qubica Worldwide formed a 50/50 joint venture, QubicaAMF Worldwide. The partnership combined Qubica's expertise in automatic scoring technology and AMF Bowling's technology in lane equipment and pinspotters.

In 2007, a new company, 900 Global, purchased the rights to sell customized bowling balls with the AMF logo. In February 2014, the principals of bowling ball manufacturer Storm Products, Inc. made a significant investment in 900 Global.

With AMF Bowling's exit from bankruptcy in 2013, the 50% interest in the QubicaAMF joint venture was brought under the control of Bowlmor AMF (now known as Lucky Strike Entertainment).

In December 2014, the Qubica original founders acquired the 50% interest held by Bowlmor AMF (now known as Lucky Strike Entertainment), bringing the manufacturing and marketing of AMF-branded bowling equipment under the full control of QubicaAMF Worldwide.

== Australia ==
For the history of AMF bowling centres in Australia, see Zone Bowling Australia. In 2017 the company changed owners and was renamed Zone Bowling, or Xtreme Entertainment in New Zealand.

== United Kingdom ==
For the history of AMF bowling centres in the UK, see Hollywood Bowl Group.

== See also ==
- Automatic scorer
- Pinspotter
- Ten-pin bowling
