= Dutch 200 =

Ten-pin bowling achievement

This is the award an American Bowling Congress member received for bowling this type of game in the 1990s.

In ten-pin bowling, a Dutch 200 is a game in which the bowler records a score of 200 by getting strikes and spares in alternation throughout the game. Strikes, when thrown in the even-numbered frames, require six spares (strike then spare in the 10th frame). For strikes in the odd-numbered frames, five spares are needed, with a strike on the last shot of the game. When bowled in certified play, the certifying body may issue a patch or other award commemorating the feat.

The term is thought to originate from the phrase "Dutch treat" which is when two individuals share the cost of a date.

Traditionally, a Dutch 200 is one of the hardest games to bowl due to the alternation of the spares and strikes which gives each frame a score of 20. Note that there are over 1.5 billion other ways to bowl an exact 200 game without using either method (which totals just 1.1 million combinations).

== Related oddity ==
Though unawarded, if a bowler can repeat the sequence of strike, strike, nine (first ball), missed spare for a full game (there is no spare attempt in the 10th frame), the score will also be 200. For the first nine frames, the bowler will score 57 (29 + 19 + 9) every three frames, for 171, with 29 more in the 10th frame to total 200.
