= Lucky Strike Entertainment Corporation =

Location-based entertainment operator

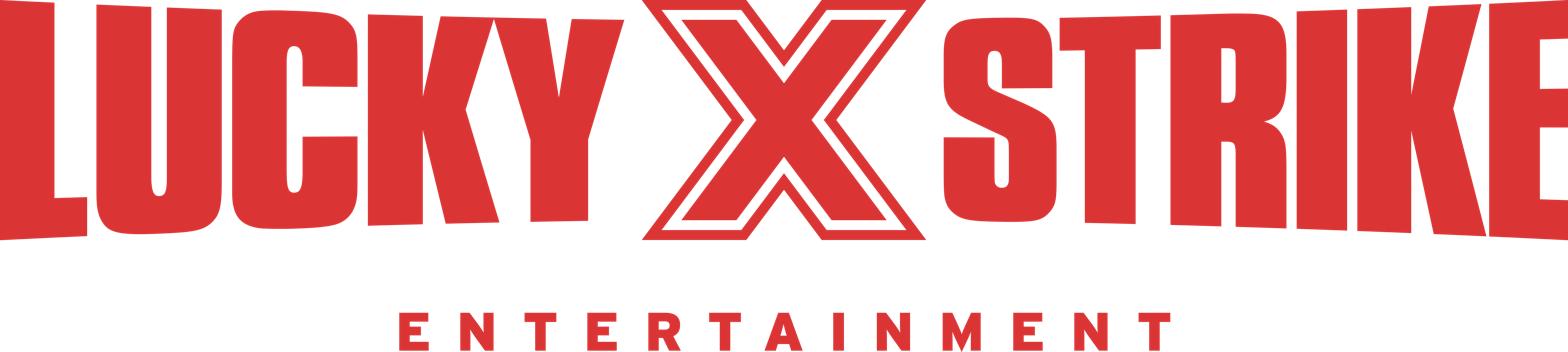
- Formerly: Bowlmor Lanes (1997-2013); Bowlmor AMF (2013–2018); Bowlero Corporation (2018–2024)
- Type: Public
- Traded as: NYSE: LUCK (Class A); Russell 2000 component
- Industry: Location-based entertainment
- Predecessor: AMF Bowling Worldwide
- Founded: 1997; 29 years ago
- Headquarters: Mechanicsville, Virginia, U.S.
- Number of locations: 365+ (2026)
- Key people: Thomas F. Shannon (Chairman & CEO); Bobby Lavan (President & CFO)
- Brands: Lucky Strike; AMF Bowling; Bowlero; Professional Bowlers Association
- Revenue: ▲US$1.2013 billion (2025)
- Operating income: ▲US$137.2 million (2025)
- Net income: ▼US$−10.0 million (2025)
- Total assets: ▲US$3.1597 billion (2025)
- Total equity: ▼US$−298.7 million (2025)
- Number of employees: approx. 12,565 (2025)
- Website: luckystrikeent.com
- Footnotes; Fiscal year ended June 29, 2025 (Form 10-K / Annual Report). All balance sheet amounts are in thousands.

Lucky Strike Entertainment Corporation (formerly known as Bowlmor AMF and Bowlero Corporation) is an American location-based entertainment operator. Their lines of business include bowling centers, family entertainment centers and waterparks. It is the largest ten-pin bowling center operator in the world with over 365 centers throughout the United States, Canada and Mexico. The centers have an average of 40 lanes compared to the U.S. bowling center average of 21 lanes.

As of September 2019, Lucky Strike Entertainment Corporation is also the parent company of the Professional Bowlers Association (PBA).

The company's main bowling center brands in the United States, Canada and Mexico include the namesake Lucky Strike (which the then-Bowlero Corporation acquired in 2023), Bowlero, and AMF brands. The company's U.S. centers represent 7% of the country's 4,200 commercial bowling centers.

== History ==
=== 1997–2013: Bowlmor transformation under Tom Shannon and development of an upscale bowling model ===
From the 1960s through the early 1980s, league bowling—a weekly group competition in which teams compete over a season—generated approximately 70% of revenue at bowling centers in the United States, and roughly 75% of all bowlers during that era were competitive league participants. By 2012, league bowling's share of center revenue had declined to approximately 40%, with serious league bowlers representing only about 21% of total participants, reflecting broader lifestyle changes including reduced participation in scheduled recreational activities and increased demand for flexible, social entertainment options.

In 1997, entrepreneur Tom Shannon acquired the Bowlmor Lanes location in New York City, which at the time was a financially underperforming, traditional bowling center. Rather than continuing to operate the venue under a league-driven model, Shannon undertook a comprehensive repositioning of the business, transforming it into an upscale entertainment destination designed to appeal to a broader, more affluent customer base.

The renovation introduced a number of operational and experiential changes that would later define the company's business model. These included modern interior design with lounge-style seating, theatrical lighting, and music-driven environments, as well as significant upgrades to food and beverage offerings, including full-service dining, premium cocktails, and bar programs. The company also shifted its marketing and sales strategy to prioritize corporate events, private parties, and group bookings, which generated higher and more predictable revenue per lane than traditional league play.

A key component of Shannon's strategy was the deliberate reduction and eventual elimination of league bowling at the flagship location. While league play historically provided consistent traffic, it relied on discounted pricing and generated lower per-customer spending. By reallocating lane inventory to casual customers and event-based bookings at market rates, Bowlmor significantly increased revenue per visit and overall profitability.

Throughout the early and mid-2000s, Shannon expanded the concept by acquiring additional bowling centers in major metropolitan markets and applying the same redevelopment strategy. These properties were typically repositioned through capital investment in design, technology, and hospitality offerings, transforming legacy bowling alleys into experiential entertainment venues. The company emphasized a hospitality-driven model, with a focus on customer experience, brand differentiation, and higher-margin revenue streams such as food, beverage, and events.

This approach aligned with broader trends in the eatertainment sector, in which traditional recreational activities are combined with dining and nightlife experiences. Bowlmor's model enabled higher per-capita spending compared to traditional bowling centers and reduced reliance on league participation, which continued to decline nationwide.

By the early 2010s, Bowlmor had established a scalable operating model and a growing national presence, with strong unit-level economics driven by premium pricing, diversified revenue streams, and event-based demand. The company's success in repositioning bowling as a social and entertainment-focused activity provided the financial foundation and operational confidence to pursue larger-scale expansion opportunities.

In 2013, leveraging the performance of its upscale bowling model, Bowlmor acquired AMF Bowling, one of the largest bowling center operators in the world, significantly expanding its footprint and marking a major turning point in the company's growth trajectory.

=== 2013: Creation of Bowlmor AMF ===
Bowlmor AMF was formed in July 2013 when AMF Bowling Worldwide, which had filed for Chapter 11 bankruptcy in May 2012, reorganized and combined with Strike Holdings LLC, which operated the upscale Bowlmor Lanes. The new company was jointly owned by Bowlmor, certain of AMF Bowling's second lien lenders including an affiliate of Cerberus Capital Management, and Credit Suisse. At the time of the merger, the merged company operated 272 bowling centers and had 7,500 employees and a combined annual revenue of approximately $450 million.

In the AMF Bowling reorganization, AMF's second lien lenders converted their debt into equity in Bowlmor AMF. Credit Suisse provided a $230 million term loan facility and a $30 million revolving loan facility, and the largest holders of AMF's existing second lien debt provided $50 million of backstop financing to provide working capital for Bowlmor AMF and to pay cash distributions in varying amounts to AMF's other creditors. AMF's first lien lenders received payment in full, in cash, of principal, interest at the non-default rate, and their fees.

Bowlmor CEO Tom Shannon became Chairman, Chief Executive Officer, and President of the combined company, and Bowlmor's Chief Financial Officer and former president, Brett Parker, became Vice Chairman, Chief Financial Officer, and Executive Vice President. Shannon and Parker collectively retained 22% of Bowlmor AMF and were set to receive bonuses based on their ability to increase the profitability and worth of Bowlmor AMF.

As part of the AMF Bowling reorganization, Bowlmor AMF assumed control of AMF Bowling's 50% interest in QubicaAMF Worldwide, one of the largest manufacturers of bowling products in the world.

When Bowlmor and AMF Bowling combined in 2013, league bowlers at AMF's existing 262 traditional bowling centers worried that the new owner would eliminate league bowling at their centers, too. Some cited a Bloomberg TV interview in which CEO Tom Shannon said, "I don't think anyone takes bowling seriously – why would you?" Concern grew when Bowlmor AMF significantly cut the operating hours at many centers as a financial measure, and in the process, displaced or eliminated some daytime bowling leagues.

Shannon was said to have responded that, "We plan to increase the league bowling business, not shrink it," citing AMF's "large customer base" in league activity for declaring that its league bowling was "very safe." He said his company has "protected and defended 99% of (its) nighttime leagues" and sees its acquisition of the Brunswick centers as "furthering (its) commitment to league play." A company spokeswoman further stated that the company also aims to "introduce a new generation to league bowling" and wants to support professional bowling, including possible sponsorships of the Professional Bowlers Association (PBA). In October 2014 the PBA entered into an entitlement partnership agreement that made the company an official partner of the PBA.

=== 2014: Acquisition of Brunswick bowling centers ===
In July 2014, the company announced that it had agreed to acquire all 85 centers of Brunswick Bowling & Billiards in a transaction to be financed by the sale and leaseback of 58 of the centers to iStar Financial, as well as a term loan. The acquisition was completed in September 2014.

Shannon was named Bowling Proprietor of the Year in 2014 by Bowlers Journal International Magazine in recognition of his "vision and bold initiatives" to "divide the AMF bowling empire into three distinct brands."

In December 2014 the Qubica founders and partners purchased Bowlmor AMF's 50% interest in Qubica.

Between 2013 and 2015, the company fired 287 managers from its 351 bowling centers. By April 2017, it was facing more than 50 discrimination complaints filed with the federal Equal Employment Opportunity Commission (EEOC), from employees who claimed to have been terminated for their age or appearance.

=== 2017: Private equity ownership ===
In June 2017, private equity firm Atairos Group paid in excess of $1 billion to acquire Bowlmor AMF from its previous investors, with Shannon continuing to hold his "significant investment."

Bowlmor AMF changed its name to Bowlero Corporation on January 4, 2018.

Logo as Bowlero Corporation

On September 10, 2019, Bowlero Corporation announced it had purchased the Professional Bowlers Association (PBA). While retaining current PBA Commissioner Tom Clark, Bowlero also appointed its Chief Customer Officer (CCO), Colie Edison, to the new role of CEO for the PBA. In an interview with Lucas Wiseman, senior editor for the PBA's FloBowling channel, Edison noted that Bowlero had been in talks with the PBA leadership for a number of years, before finally deciding the time was right for the acquisition.

By January 2020, all remaining Brunswick locations were rebranded with either the Bowlero or AMF names.

On October 9, 2020, Bowlero Corporation was featured on the American TV Series Undercover Boss, with Edison in the role of the disguised boss.

In April 2021, Bowlero partnered with sports betting company, BettorView, in order to display sports data and wagering at multiple locations.

=== 2021: Public listing ===
As of June 23, 2021, Bowlero was in merger talks with Isos Acquisition Corporation, a special-purpose acquisition company (SPAC) led by former WWE executives, to go public through a merger. On July 1, 2021, Isos Acquisition Corporation announced it had officially merged with Bowlero, with the intent to take Bowlero public and list it on the New York Stock Exchange.

=== 2023: Acquisition of Lucky Strike Lanes ===
In May 2023, Bowlero announced an agreement to acquire the Lucky Strike bowling brand and its locations across the United States. The transaction closed on September 18, 2023, bringing 14 Lucky Strike venues across nine states into the company's portfolio and expanding its presence in upscale bowling entertainment venues.

From 2021 to 2023, the company's annual revenue increased, from a few hundred million dollars, to more than one billion. By 2023, its revenues represented about one quarter of the industry's total revenue.

In May 2023, CNBC reported that the EEOC was investigating numerous claims of age discrimination and retaliation, and was seeking $60 million to settle the claims. In May 2024, the EEOC concluded a nine-year investigation into Bowlero regarding age discrimination and retaliation complaints, with the EEOC, declining to sue the company but not clearing it of wrongdoing, thereby allowing more than 70 individual claimants to pursue private lawsuits against the company.

=== 2024: Expansion beyond bowling and corporate rebrand ===
In May 2024, Bowlero Corporation acquired the Raging Waves water park in Yorkville, Illinois for approximately $49 million as part of its strategy to expand into broader location-based entertainment offerings.

On December 2, 2024, Bowlero Corporation announced that it would rebrand as Lucky Strike Entertainment Corporation, effective December 12, 2024. The company stated the name change reflected the growing prominence of the Lucky Strike brand and its broader portfolio of experiential entertainment venues.

=== 2025: Major acquisitions and real estate strategy ===
In July 2025, Lucky Strike Entertainment acquired the real estate underlying 58 of its bowling and entertainment venues across 16 U.S. states for approximately $306 million. The venues had previously operated under a master lease agreement, and the acquisition was intended to reduce long-term rent obligations and provide greater operational control of key locations.

On July 31, 2025, the company announced the acquisition of two water parks—Raging Waters Los Angeles and Wet 'n Wild Emerald Pointe—as well as three family entertainment centers: Castle Park in Riverside, California, Boomers Vista, and Boomers Palm Springs. The acquisitions collectively attract more than 1.5 million annual visitors and represented a significant expansion into the water park and amusement park sectors.

=== 2026: Leadership changes and PBA expansion ===
In January 2026, Lucky Strike Entertainment and the Professional Bowlers Association (PBA) announced the appointment of Peter Murray as Chief Executive Officer of the PBA and Head of Media for Lucky Strike Entertainment. The role was created to oversee the continued expansion of the PBA as a global sports and media property. The PBA CEO position had been vacant since Colie Edison resigned in January 2022 to take a position with the WNBA.

In March 2026, Lucky Strike Entertainment announced that President Lev Ekster had resigned from the company. Founder Tom Shannon subsequently assumed the role of President in addition to his positions as Chairman and Chief Executive Officer.

On May 6, 2026, Lucky Strike Entertainment was named in a federal lawsuit alleging the violation of federal antitrust laws and state consumer protection provisions.

== Banners ==
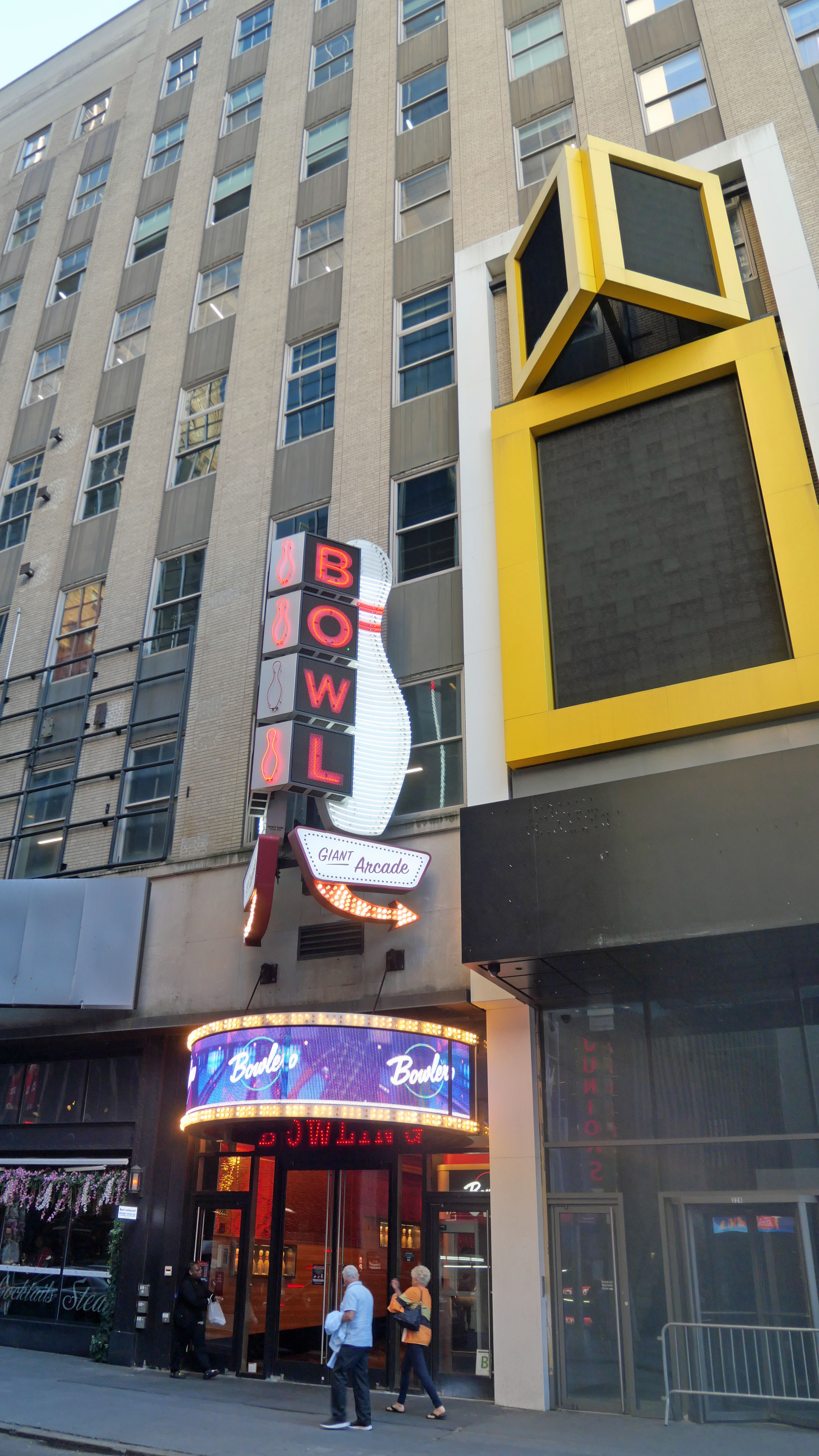
Bowlero Times Square in 2023

Lucky Strike Entertainment Corporation operates bowling centers and family entertainment venues under several banners:

- Lucky Strike centers are positioned as upscale entertainment destinations that combine bowling with elevated food and beverage, nightlife-inspired design, and premium social experiences. These locations are typically found in major metropolitan markets and are designed for high-end group events, corporate outings, and nightlife-driven play. Many of these locations once used the Bowlmor Lanes banner, which as of 2026, has been retired.
- Bowlero centers are positioned as modern, full-service bowling and entertainment venues offering open bowling, group events, arcade games, and food and beverage in a high-energy, contemporary environment. Many Bowlero locations originated as AMF or Brunswick Zone centers and were later renovated and rebranded, while others were newly constructed or acquired from independent operators.
- AMF centers represent the company’s traditional neighborhood bowling centers and league houses. As America’s longest-standing bowling brand, AMF locations emphasize leagues, youth programs, open play, and community-focused bowling. While many AMF centers have been converted to the Bowlero banner, the AMF brand continues to operate as a distinct concept focused on classic bowling traditions.

=== Operations ===
In addition to its bowling brands, Lucky Strike Entertainment also operates family entertainment centers and waterparks through brands such as Boomers, Big Kahuna’s, Raging Waters, and other regional attractions acquired through expansion and acquisition.

- Boomers! Parks
  - Boomers! Palm Springs , Palm Springs, California
  - Boomers! Visalia , Visalia, California
  - Boomers! Vista , Vista, California
- Raging Waters
  - Raging Waters , Los Angeles, California
- Raging Waves Waterpark, Yorkville, Illinois
- Big Kahuna's Waterpark and Adventure Park , Destin, Florida
- Castle Park , Riverside, California
- Shipwreck Island Waterpark , Panama City Beach, Florida
- Wet 'n Wild Emerald Pointe , Greensboro, North Carolina
