= Five-pin bowling =

Form of bowling

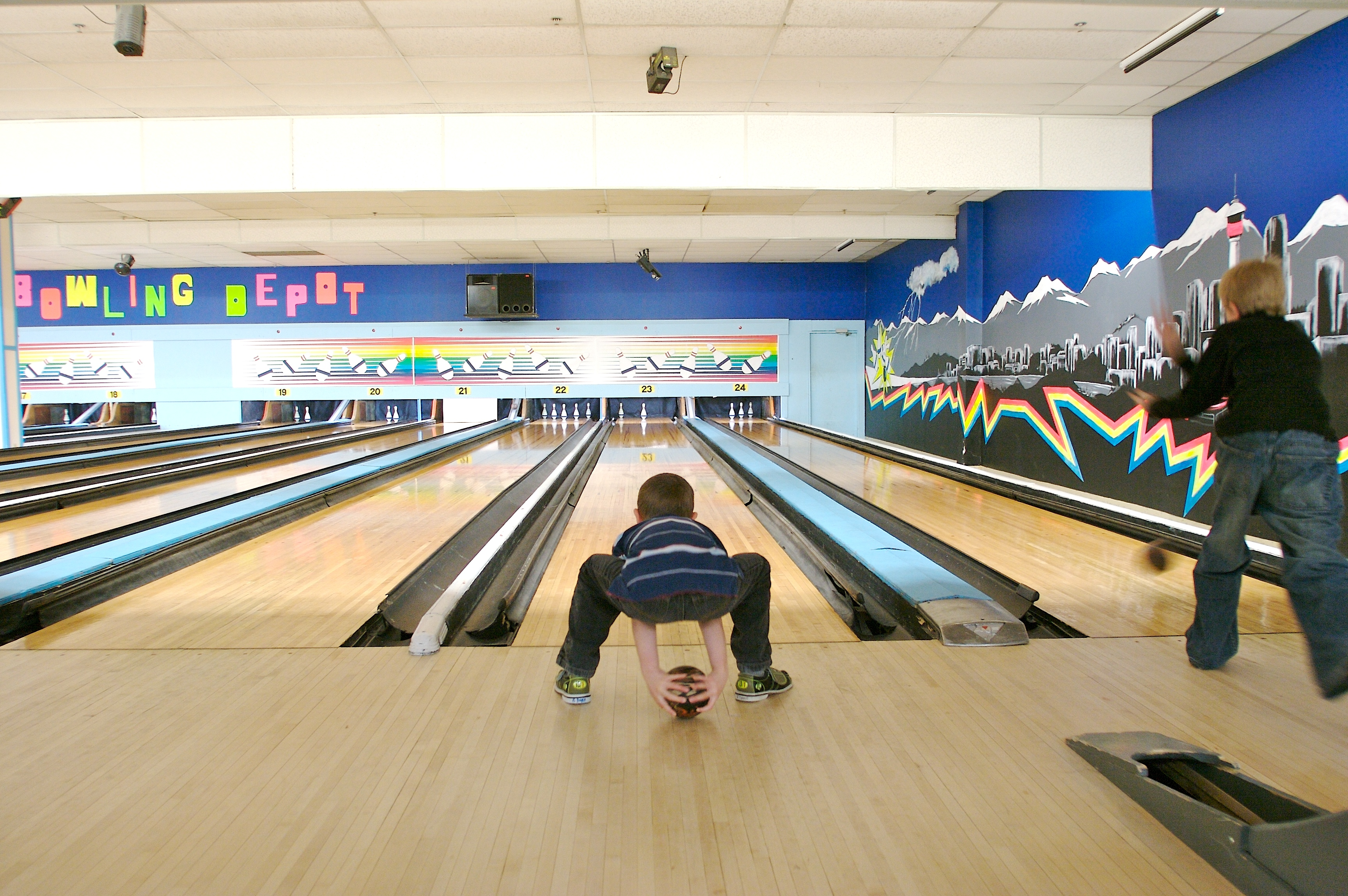
A boy five-pin bowling at a bowling alley in Calgary, Alberta

Five-pin bowling is a bowling variant which is played in Canada, where many bowling alleys offer it, either alone or in combination with ten-pin bowling. It was devised around 1909 by Thomas F. Ryan in Toronto, Ontario, at his Toronto Bowling Club, in response to customers who complained that the ten-pin game was too strenuous. He cut five tenpins down to about 75% of their size, and used hand-sized hard rubber balls, thus inventing the original version of five-pin bowling.

== Gameplay ==
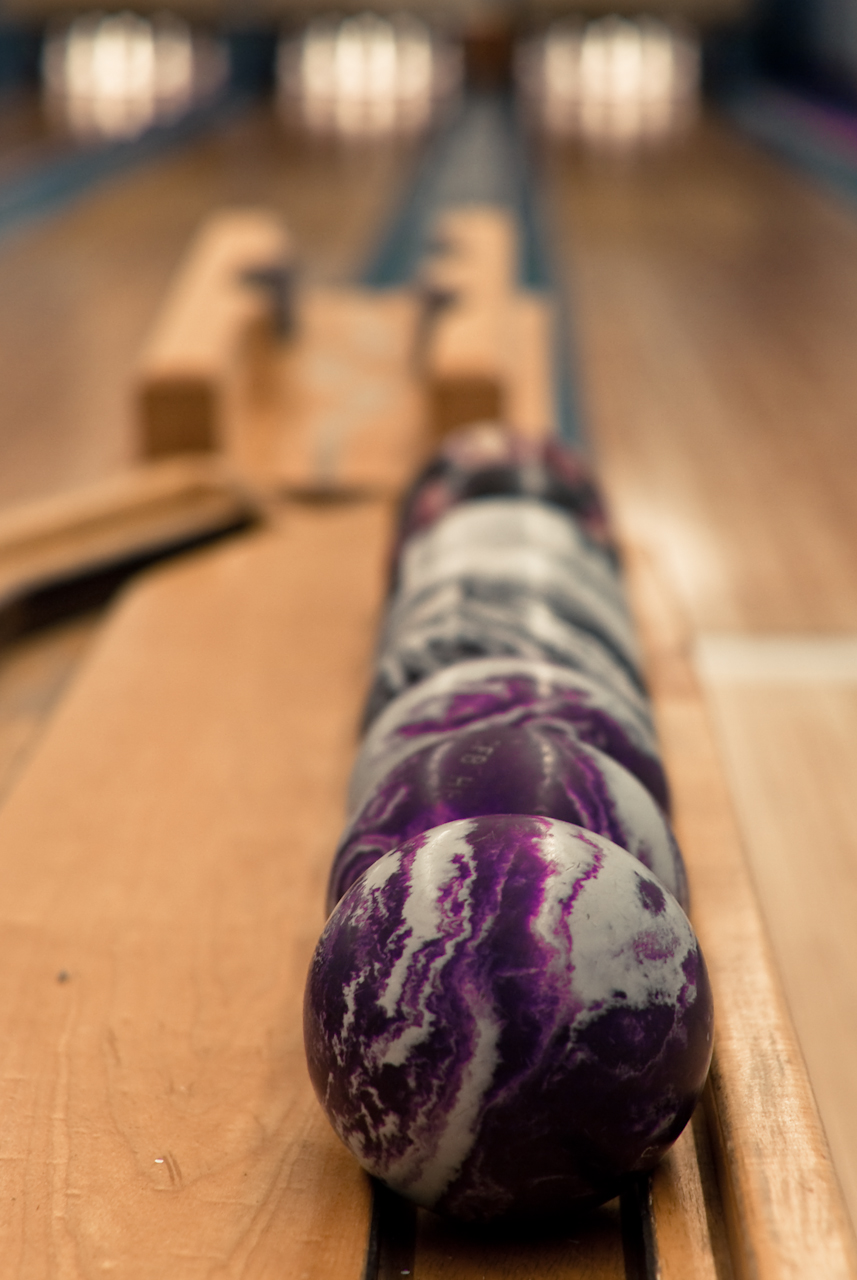
Five-pin bowling balls

The balls in five pin bowling are small enough to fit in the hand and therefore typically have no fingerholes, although the Canadian 5 Pin Bowlers Association (C5PBA) has approved balls with thumb holes.

At the end of the lane there are five pins arranged in a V. They are midway in size between duckpins and ten pins, and they have a heavy rubber band around their middles to make them move farther when struck.

Unlike any other form of bowling popular in North America, the pins in five-pin bowling are worth different scoring point values, depending on their location in the V-formation. The centre pin is worth five points if knocked down, those on either side, three each, and the outermost pins, two each, giving a total of 15 in each frame.

In each frame, each player gets three attempts to knock all five pins over. Knocking all five pins down with the first ball is a strike, worth 15 points, plus the score achieved by the player's first two balls of the next frame are added to the score for the strike; the count in the frame where the first strike was bowled is left blank until the bowler makes their first delivery of the next frame. As those points are also counted in their own frame, in effect they count double. A player who takes two balls to knock all the pins down gets a spare, which means the first ball of the next frame counts double. When a bowler bowls two strikes in succession, within a game, the bowler has scored a "double". When a double has been bowled, the count for the first strike is 30 points plus the value of the pins bowled down with the first ball of the frame following the second strike. When a bowler bowls three strikes in succession, within a game, the bowler has scored a "triple" (also called a "turkey"). In scoring three successive strikes, the bowler is credited with 45 points in the frame where the first strike was bowled. As in ten-pin, if either of these happen in the last frame, the player gets to take one or two shots at a re-racked set of pins immediately.

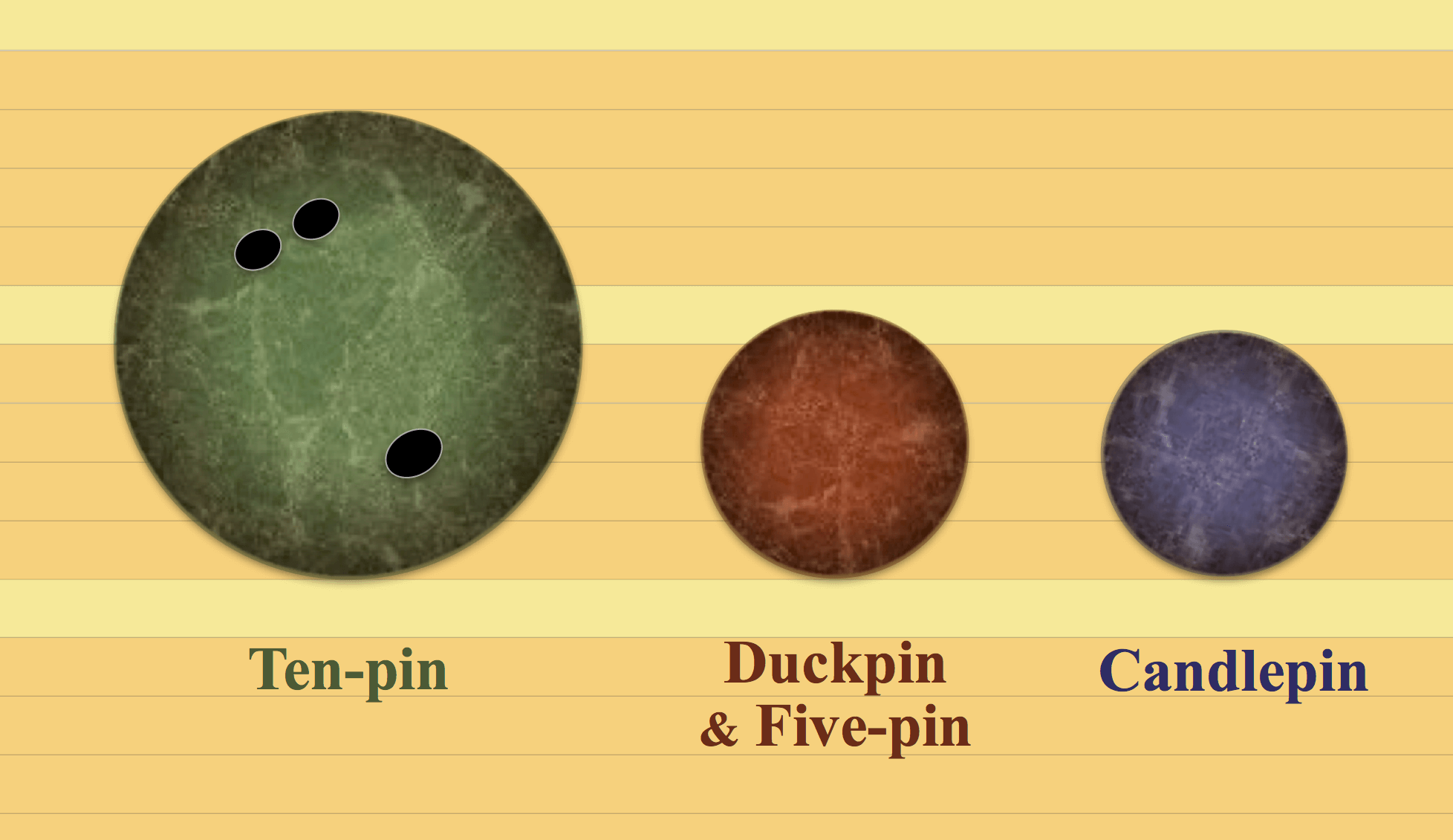
Comparative sizes of bowling balls, portrayed on boards of a bowling lane. Balls for five-pin bowling are the same size as those for duckpin bowling.

A perfect score is 450, requiring 12 consecutive strikes bowled in the same game without fouling. It does not happen as frequently as in tenpin bowling. The C5PBA sanctions from 15 to 30 perfect games annually.

Example of a perfect 450 game score sheet
Frame	1	2	3	4	5	6	7	8	9	10
	X	X	X	X	X	X	X	X	X	XXX
Name	45	90	135	180	225	270	315	360	405	450

Originally the pins counted as (from left to right) 4 - 2 - 1 - 3 - 5 points. In 1952 the president of the Canadian Bowling Association proposed changing the scoring system to 2 - 3 - 5 - 3 - 2. That was accepted in the west in 1952, in Ontario in 1953, and in the rest of Canada in 1954.

In 1967 the Canadian Bowling Congress decided to abolish the counter pin (the left counter pin had to be knocked down to score any points). The counter pin was the right 2-pin for left-handed bowlers. The rule change went in effect in 1968 in eastern Canada, but the Western Canada 5-pin Bowling Association rejected the change, and as a result there were no national championships until 1972 after the west accepted abolishing the counter pin. (Although some leagues continued with the counter pin system for several more years.)

=== Terminology ===
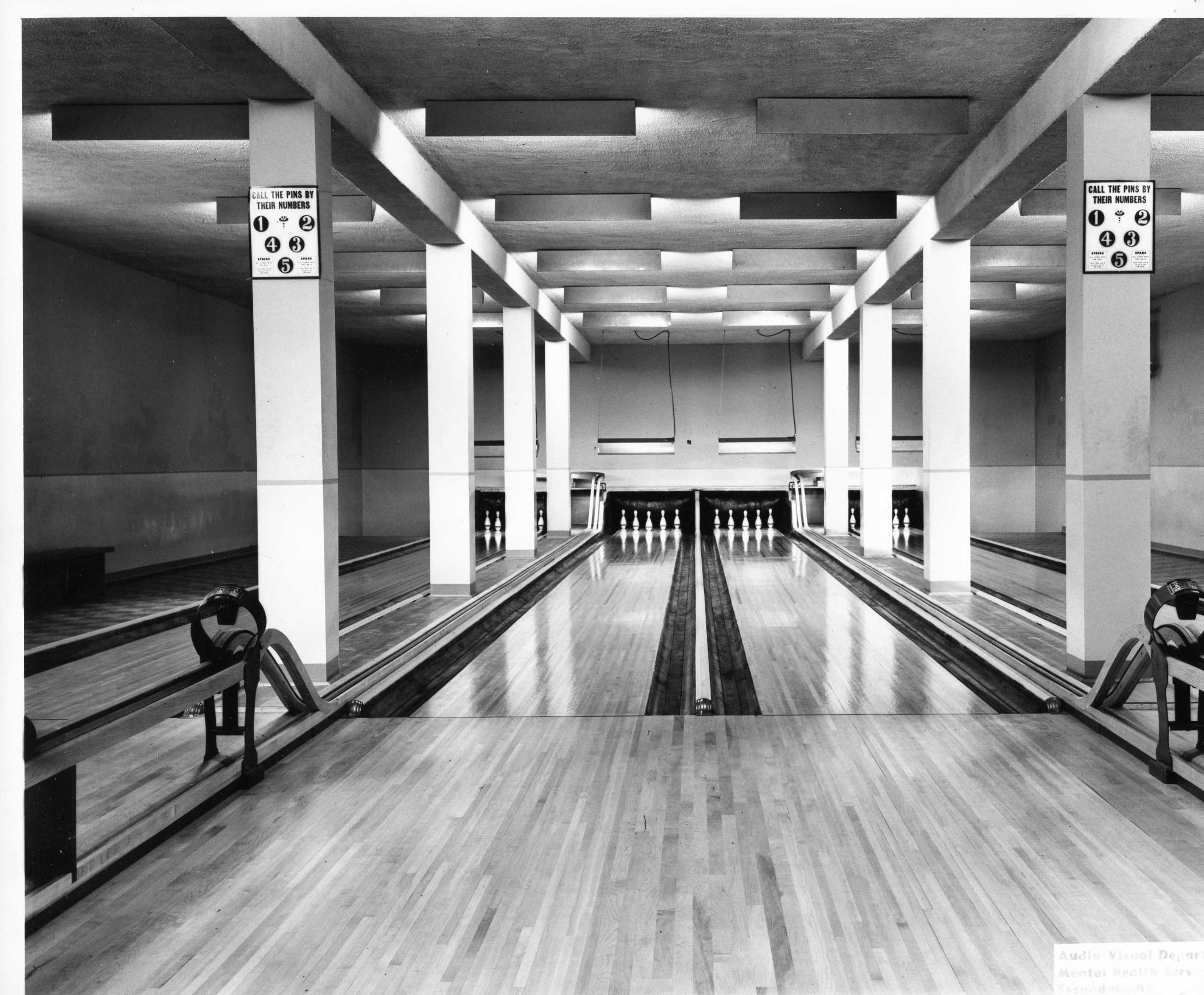
A five-pin bowling alley in Coquitlam, British Columbia in 1955

Five-pin bowlers use a number of terms to denote the results of a throw:

- "[number]-pack": Term for a number of consecutive strikes; e.g. six consecutive strikes is a "six-pack". Also referred to as "[number]-bagger" (e.g. six-bagger).
- "10 the hard way": After the third ball, having a frame score of 10 where the remaining pins are a 3-pin and a 2-pin that are not "neighbours".
- "Aces" (A): taking out the headpin and both three pins but leaving the two corner pins. Also referred to as "bed posts", "goal posts" or "channel 11".
- "Chop" or "chop-off" (denoted "c/o"): Hitting the headpin and the 3 and 2 pins on one side on the first ball, leaving the other 3 and 2 pins on the other side.
- "Clean game": Finishing a game with a strike or spare in every frame.
- "Corner-pin": Leaving only the left corner pin or right corner pin standing on the first ball is denoted by an "L" or an "R" respectively on a score sheet.
- "Fifteen": When all pins are knocked down after the third ball. Also referred to as a "clean up".
- "Headpin" (denoted H on a score sheet): punching out the headpin on the first ball. This is the most dreaded result on the first ball, as converting the spare resulting from punching out the headpin (a "headpin-spare") is extremely difficult to achieve.
- "Punch": Hitting only one pin when two or more pins are remaining (commonly known as a "cherry" on the 2nd or 3rd ball)
- "Split" (S): Taking out the headpin and one of the three-pins, scoring 8 on the first ball. Difficult to obtain a spare on the second ball but if accomplished, this is known as a "split-spare". Many bowling associations will offer a special pin for this achievement.
- "Strike out": To throw consecutive strikes until the end of the game. Commonly said in the last frame of a game.
- "Turkey": Three consecutive strikes
- "Wood" or "deadwood": The pins left on the lane, usually after throwing the first two balls of a frame. This originates from when bowling pins were typically made of wood and not acrylic.

== Major tournaments ==
There are four groups overseeing the major tournaments in five pin bowling.

- Canadian Five Pin Bowler's Association (C5PBA): The C5PBA is the body that governs the rules and regulations of the game. The C5PBA operates three major national tournaments. The showcase tournament is the "Open", a scratch tournament that involves both teams and singles. The national finals of the Open span three to four days and culminate with a stepladder format to determine national champions in men's singles, women's singles, men's teams, women's teams, and mixed teams. There is a second tournament known as The Youth Challenge, which is shorter than the Open in length, but involves a similar format to the Open, this tournament is for youth bowlers between the ages of 12 and 19. The Inter-Provincial, which replaced the High Low Doubles, became a national event in 2008 and is a pins over average (POA) team format.
- Bowl Canada: Bowl Canada is the body that represents the bowling centre owners. The organization previously operated under Bowling Proprietors Association of Canada (BPAC). Bowl Canada oversees Youth Bowling Canada (YBC) and Club 55+ (formerly the Golden Age Bowler's Club). Both organizations feature national championships. The YBC national championship is known as the "Four Steps to Stardom" while the Club 55+ national championship is known as the "Team Triples". Bowl Canada also runs the National Classified Championships, a scratch tournament where bowlers are qualify through their bowling centre within average categories. In 2016, the National Classified was replaced with a handicap-format tournament known as the Bowl Canada Cup while the Team Triples was updated to a four-person handicap-format team known as the "Club 55+ Cup". Bowl Canada runs the Canadian qualifying for the AMF World Cup and the various five-pin TV shows such as CBC's Championship Five Pin Bowling and the TSN Pins Game. In 2006, the CBC series and the TSN series were consolidated into one tournament, the Canadian Bowling Championships. As of 2009, TSN dropped the Canadian Bowling Championships from its televised schedule.
- The Master Bowlers Association of Canada: The MBAC is a unique organization that serves as the technical branch of the sport and provides a single national championship with both total pinfall (Tournament division) and pins over average (Teaching Division) divisions. A third branch of this organization involves the Seniors Division (over 55yrs). Typically the Teaching and Senior Division bowlers hold mid- to lower-range bowling averages. Bowlers in the Teaching Division are required to serve as coaches in YBC. The Master Bowlers operate under a strict dress code including a standard shirt in the provincial colours with the bowler's name embroidered on the back.
- The Western Canadian Bowling Tour has grown in size and now has five major cash tournaments. There were changes to the schedule in 2025. The Tour now starts with the Beef Bowl at Panorama Lanes in Medicine Hat, Alberta. The Autumn Open is held in Calgary, Alberta at Paradise Lanes. The TPC at Sherwood is at Sherwood Bowl in Sherwood Park, Alberta. Joining the WCBT in 2022 was the Manitoba Open, which is played at St. James Lanes in Winnipeg. The Heritage Traditional is played in Red Deer, Alberta at Heritage Lanes. The season is now capped off by the WCBTour Championship in August, where the Top 12 players with membership for the season go and compete in a filmed tournament to determine the Tour Champion. In 2026, this was scheduled in Medicine Hat to be filmed the day before the start of the Beef Bowl. The Regina Classic was discontinued in 2025.

Qualifying for a national championship usually requires three qualifying rounds.

- League, House or Centre round: for most provinces, this is usually not required for the C5PBA Open or C5PBA Youth Challenge.
- Zone round: the number of centres in each zone varies, but the zones are set up geographically. In some provinces and tournaments, the zone round may be bypassed.
- Provincial championships: the winners of the zone round qualify for the provincial finals. For most tournaments, Ontario runs two provincial finals—a north provincial (Northern Ontario) and a south provincial (Ontario).

Each province also offers a number of tournaments that conclude with the provincial finals. The tournaments, formats and prize offerings vary by province. These tournaments are operated through the Provincial Bowling Proprietors Association, local and provincial five pin associations, and individual bowling centres.

== Facts and figures ==
- At first, bowling pins used in five-pin were made of plastic-coated maple. Today's pins are made of a hard plastic and often feature UV-glow capability for black light glow bowling operations. The pin makes a "clack" sound when hit by the ball. The base of the plastic pin can be separated from the rest of the pin. The neck stripes on plastic pins are actually a red plastic tape that wears off with use and can be replaced. In 2011, the C5PBA approved a new pin base. The new base adds 1/8 inch of height to the pin, raises the pin's centre of gravity, and lowers the contact area with the lane. This new base has a dark color, so pins with the new base may appear to the bowler as floating above the lane.
- In 1990, the Canadian 5 Pin Bowlers Association sanctioned the use of personalized bowling balls. Before then, only bowling balls supplied by the bowling centre were allowed to be used.
- Many five pin tournaments scored by handicap usually use a scoring basis of "pins over average", which is the difference between the outcome of a game and the bowler's established average. It accumulates over the number of games bowled. This statistic can be negative.
- Modern automatic scoring systems (including Steltronic, Brunswick Sync and QubicaAMF BES X) are certified for five-pin. On most string type pinsetters, automatic scoring equipment is connected directly to the pinsetter circuitry. Scoring cameras can be used on both types of pinsetting installations. Most systems mount the camera between lanes as in tenpin; however the ProScore system—when installed on free-fall—reads scores using a set of five electronic eyes mounted above the pindeck.
- Bowling centres with convertible pinsetters usually will set specific hours as to when their convertible lanes will support five-pin or ten-pin. Convertible machines may support duckpin bowling instead of ten-pin when in ten-pin mode. Only certain models of string pinsetters have been sanctioned by the USBC for ten-pin play.
- Some five-pin centres have installed lane protection devices. The device is a sheet of plexiglas mounted vertically about six inches (15 cm) above the lane and is located just past the target arrows on the lane. This device discourages bowlers from lofting the ball and damaging the lane—which is more prevalent in small ball bowling. A ball that knocks the plexiglas loose or flies over the plexiglas guard is worth zero points under C5PBA rules.
- A foul line violation in five-pin results in a 15-point penalty. Pins knocked over during a violating delivery count. The penalty is assessed at the end of the game. This compares to a zero score for the ball in other bowling disciplines.
- Some believe that the hockey term "five-hole" (the space between the goaltender's legs) is taken from five-pin bowling. Knocking out the headpin (worth 5 points) by itself leaves a large hole through which it is easy to put the next one or two balls without hitting anything.
- Five-pin bowling is played in all Canadian provinces and territories. However, in Quebec, New Brunswick and Nova Scotia, it is not the dominant form of bowling.
  - In Quebec, five-pin is known as "cinq quilles" (five pins) in French, while "Petites Quilles" refers to the duckpin game.
  - There is only one five-pin bowling alley in all of New Brunswick.
  - In Nova Scotia, the Worcester, Massachusetts–originated sport of candlepin bowling is more popular given that five-pin bowling alleys are located primarily on army bases.
  - Nunavut has only one five-pin bowling alley. It is a two-lane facility located at CFS Alert and also happens to be the world's most northerly bowling lanes. As a result, this alley is only accessible to military personnel and visitors to the base.
- Five-pin bowling was one of four sports featured on the Canadian Inventions: Sports series issued by Canada Post stamps on August 10, 2009.
- As of July 2026, there are only 22 remaining active free fall five-pin bowling lanes.
- In 2007, five-pin bowling was ranked #4 during the CBC miniseries The Greatest Canadian Invention.
