= Vallco Shopping Mall =

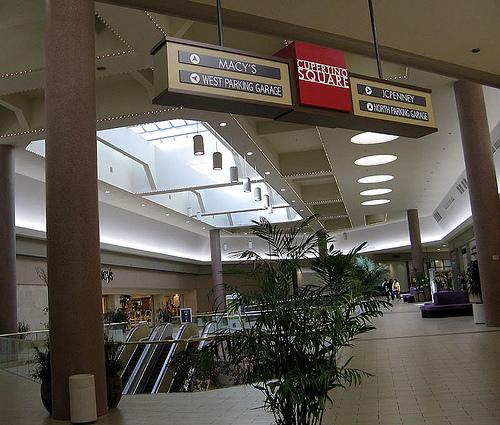
- Interior view of Vallco Shopping Mall, then called Cupertino Square. This section of the mall was demolished in late 2019.
- Location: Cupertino, California, U.S.
- Coordinates: 37.3263°N 122.0144°W
- Address: 10123 N Wolfe Road
- Opened: September 1, 1976
- Closed: 2018 (indoor only)
- Developer: Vallco Fashion Park Venture (Phillip Lyon, Gordon & Co. and Vallco Park Ltd.)
- Owner: Sand Hill Property Co.
- Num. of stores: 140 (1976) 190 (1988)
- Num. of anchor tenants: 0 (originally 4)
- Floor area: 1,200,000 ft^{2} (110,000 m^{2}) Macy's; 179,962 ft^{2} (16,719.0 m^{2}) Sears; 257,548 ft^{2} (23,927.0 m^{2}) J. C. Penney; 548,856 ft^{2} (50,990.4 m^{2}) I. Magnin; 56,000 ft^{2} (5,200 m^{2})
- Floors: 2 (formerly 3 with AMC Theatres)

Vallco Shopping Mall (formerly called Cupertino Square and originally Vallco Fashion Park) is a mostly-demolished dead mall located in Cupertino, California, United States. Originally built as a two-story shopping mall in 1976 with a third-level movie theater added in 2007, it was anchored for most of its existence by Macy's, Sears, and J.C. Penney. As of August 2022, the mall is owned by Sand Hill Property Co. and is almost entirely vacant, with Cupertino Ice Center (formerly the Ice Capades Chalet), Bowlmor Lanes, and Benihana as the only remaining tenants, all in the section to the east of Wolfe Road. The larger western portion of the main mall structure was demolished in August 2019, followed by the demolition of the pedestrian overpass in March 2020. Plans for the site include a mixed-use development featuring office space, housing, and retail.

A plan by Sand Hill to rebuild Vallco as a mixed-use development with retail, housing, and office space topped by a green roof park was canceled after Cupertino voters rejected Measure D on the November 2016 ballot. After obtaining community input in the planning phase, the project ran into significant push-back from citizens who wanted to freeze the site as retail-only, citing concerns about traffic and schools.

In 2018, Sand Hill proposed a revised development plan under the auspices of SB 35, which was approved by Cupertino and includes 2,402 apartments, 1.8 million square feet of office space, and 400,000 square feet of retail. Of the apartments, half of them will be affordable with no government subsidies, which would quintuple Cupertino's affordable housing stock.

== Major stores and activities ==
Vallco was formerly anchored by the following department stores:

- Macy's (originally Bullock's, then Emporium and later Emporium-Capwell) (closed March 15, 2015)
- Sears (closed October 4, 2015)
- J. C. Penney (closed April 8, 2016)
- I. Magnin (closed 1992, later became Express and finally Dynasty Seafood Restaurant on its lower level)

AMC Theatres also left the mall on March 22, 2018. Currently, the only tenants are Bowlmor Lanes and Cupertino Ice Center on the lower level and Benihana on the upper level. All of the current occupants have exterior entrances; the interior hallways of the mall have been closed to public access since late 2018.

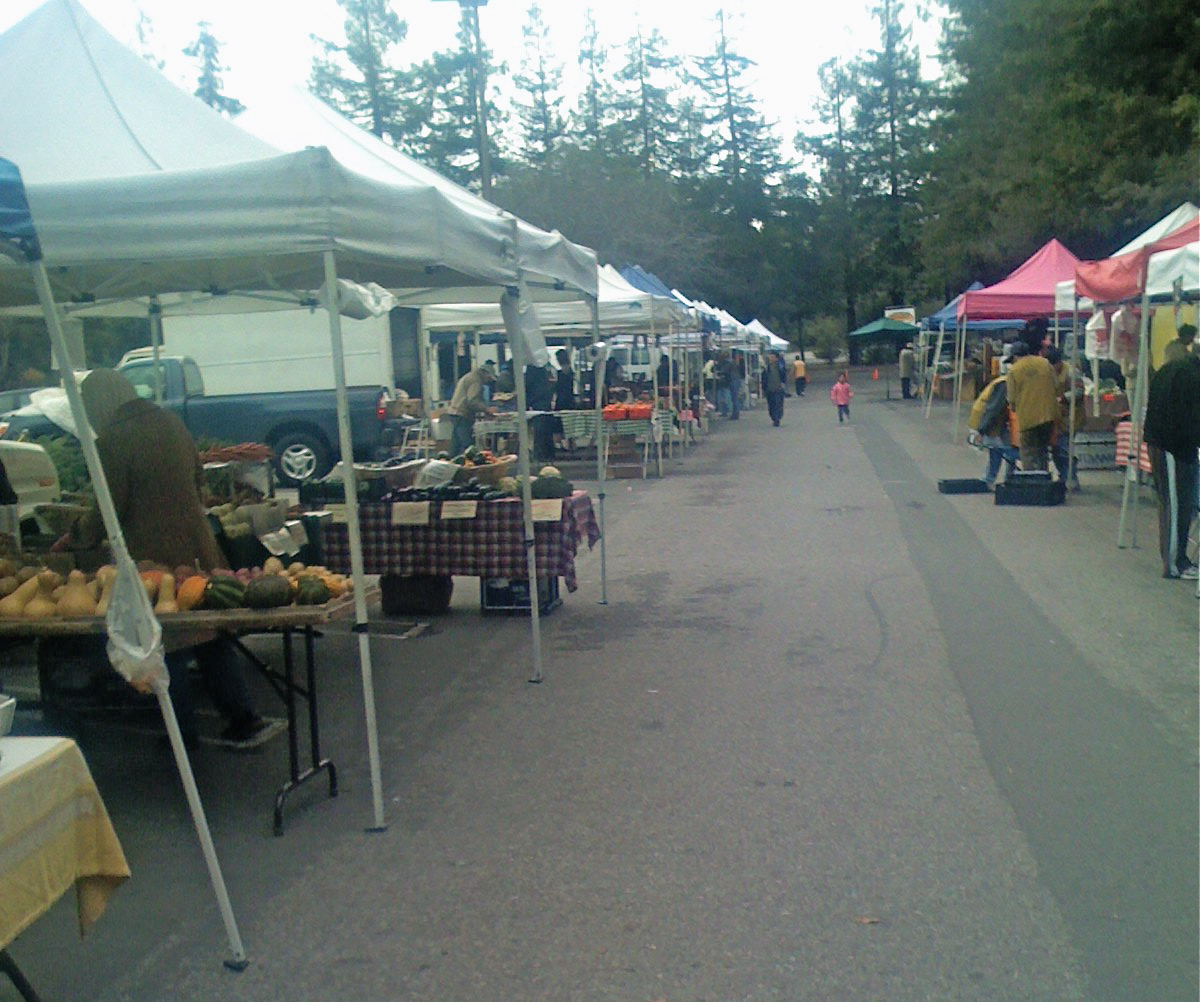
Winter morning at the farmers' market, 2007

Vallco also formerly hosted the Pacific Coast Farmers' Market in the parking lot behind J.C. Penney. The market's final day at Vallco was December 30, 2016, after which it relocated to nearby Creekside Park.

== History ==
=== Origins and expansion ===
In the early 1970s, the Cupertino City Council held public hearings to consider potential locations for a regional shopping center. After determining that the city could support only one such center, the Vallco group found itself competing with another group led by orchard owner Paul Mariani Jr. In 1973, the City Council chose to locate the regional shopping center on the edge of the city and granted the necessary zoning to Vallco.

Vallco Fashion Park held its grand opening at 6:00 pm on September 1, 1976. In its first several years, the mall's main walkway was punctuated by several parks showcasing aspects of local history, ranging from apricots to Klystron tubes. Vallco was one of the largest shopping centers in Silicon Valley and soon drew customers from all over the region.

One of the early features of the mall was the ice skating rink attached to the shopping center. The Ice Capades Chalet, open for almost ten years, began to encounter trouble in 1986, when proposals to close it and replace it with movie theatres emerged (not to be confused with the more recent AMC Theatres, which was instead built on a new third level over the central portion of the mall). By June 3, 1988, the rink faced imminent closure, until the Cupertino City Council stepped in and kept the rink open when faced with vocal protest. At the time, the ice rink was one of two year-round skating rinks nearby – the other being the Ice Capades Chalet at San Mateo Fashion Island.

It was also the first place that sold San Jose Sharks merchandise, before the SAP Center (formerly called the San Jose Arena and the HP Pavilion) was built.

=== Decline ===
Beginning in 1986, increased competition from other regional malls such as Stanford Shopping Center and in particular Valley Fair (renovated into an indoor shopping mall that year) began to cause Vallco trouble. Foot traffic began to rapidly decline, and tenants began to move to these competing malls. In July 1988, an $20 million expansion for Vallco was announced, which expanded the lower level to the western half of the mall and added 50 stores, increasing the total store count from 140 to 190. Ultimately, this expansion was completed in August 1988, adding a total of 60 stores.

On the weekend of August 11, 1990, Tilt Family Entertainment Center opened on the lower level, replacing the original food court.

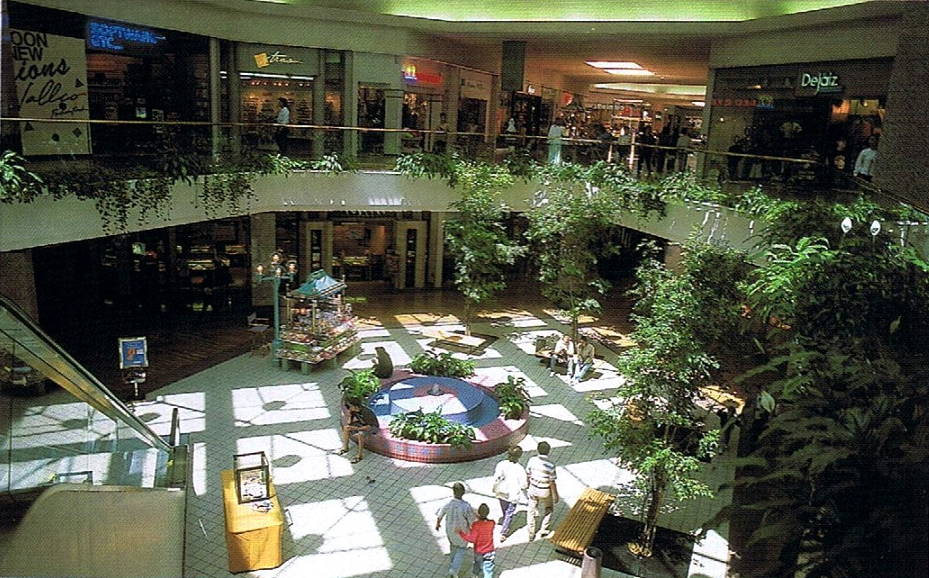
Vallco Mall c. 1990

=== Closure and renovation ===
Occupancy began to decline in the 1990s, and the emptying of the mall continued until 2019. Alan Wong, Emily Chen, and John Nguyen bought Vallco and began renovation of the mostly empty mall in 2005. By 2006, Vallco had the lowest occupancy rate of any mall in the area, at just 24 percent. One of the changes made to Vallco as part of these new renovations was to completely close the mall's lower level in 2005, with a handful of exceptions, including the anchor stores, Cupertino Ice Center, Tilt Family Entertainment Center (two years later Strike Bowling, then Bowlmor Lanes), and Dynasty Seafood Restaurant, leaving the focus on the second floor. New tenants were pulled in over the next few years.

In 2006, Cupertino voters prevented re-zoning of part of the Vallco property for condominiums by overturning a re-zoning ordinance that had been passed by the city council. The loss of the revenue that was expected from this sale contributed to the financial problems of the owners. The contractor for the movie theater, DPR, filed a mechanic's lien against the owners for approximately $10 million in July 2007, which was settled the following September when Orbit Resources acquired the mall.

Vallco Fashion Park's name was changed to Cupertino Square in 2007. Later that year, the owners sold three parcels of land to Evershine Property Management and sold a controlling stake of the mall to Orbit Resources, which switched managing agents from Landmark Property Management to Jones Lang LaSalle.

On May 4, 2007, a new 16-screen AMC movie theater opened in the center of the mall, coinciding with the theatrical release of Spider-Man 3. The grand opening of this highly anticipated film and the theater was heavily marketed towards the students of nearby Cupertino High School. During construction of this theater, on February 27, 2006, strong winds toppled a 30-ton crane onto the roof of the mall, puncturing a substantial hole in the roof and resulting in water damage to several stores below the damaged section.

On July 20, 2007, a new bowling alley called Strike Bowling opened at the former location of Tilt Family Entertainment Center, and access to it from Cupertino Ice Center was closed off. In November 2010, the bowling alley was renamed Bowlmor Lanes.

Renovation of the mall that began in 2005 continued. By 2009, two new parking structures were added to the complex. Future plans at the time included new shops facing the street at the corner of Wolfe Road and Vallco Parkway, a seismic upgrade of the parking garage west of the theaters and the main mall structure, two new hotels, and a Hofbrau beer hall adjacent to the AMC Theatres. However, the bankruptcy filing in 2008 derailed these plans.

In September 2008, the two owners of the complex filed for bankruptcy to prevent the primary financier, Gramercy Capital, from foreclosing on their property. According to Gramercy, the assets of the company fell well below the debt owed, though the consortium disputed this.

In September 2009, Vietnamese food processing company Son Son Co. purchased Cupertino Square for $64 million in an all-cash transaction. The new owners restored the name Vallco Shopping Mall.

==== Current ownership ====
In October 2014, Sand Hill Property Co. purchased the Macy's, J. C. Penney, and Sears sites for approximately $200 million. In November 2014, Sand Hill completed purchase of the entire mall for a total of $320 million, the first time the entire mall, including the anchor stores, had been under the same ownership.

In January 2015, J. C. Penney and Macy's announced plans to close their Vallco locations; Sears then announced that its store would close in October 2015. These closings left Vallco without any anchor tenants, rendering it a dead mall.

== Demolition and redevelopment ==
In August 2015, Sand Hill announced a plan to demolish the mall and replace it with The Hills at Vallco, a retail, office, and residential development based on a street grid. It was to be covered with the world's largest green roof, to be occupied by a city park. Rafael Viñoly Architects and OLIN Landscape Architects were selected as chief designers of the project.

In November 2016, voters rejected two ballot initiatives related to Vallco: Measure C, which would have attempted to freeze Vallco as a retail center without offices or housing, in addition to imposing additional restrictions on development options throughout the city, and Measure D, which would have approved the proposed Hills at Vallco project, bypassing standard city approval processes. In the wake of the votes, Sand Hill announced it would stop investing in the mall. Managing Director Reed Moulds said the company "will not sell the land nor make investments into the current failed asset. In order for us to invest in Vallco we have to be certain it will be a worthwhile investment and not just the Band-Aid approaches that have failed Vallco for decades. Until Cupertino is ready for that approach, we have no choice but to stop". In a follow-up statement, Moulds said that current tenants' leases would be honored so long as they remained at the mall; AMC Theatres, Bowlmor Lanes, Ice Center Cupertino, and Benihana all indicated their intention to stay. However, all vacant areas of the mall would be closed for security reasons, and remaining tenants without lease terms were to be evicted.

In May 2017, Sand Hill began implementing the closure of vacant areas, with seven new interior walls erected and a fenced-off section in front of the former Macy's. On March 7, 2018, Sand Hill and AMC Theatres announced that the movie theater would close on March 22, 2018 – making the 16-screen megaplex's lifespan less than 11 years.

In March 2018, Sand Hill proposed a revised mixed-use development plan with an increase from 800 to 2,402 residential units, and still including a rooftop park. The company submitted an application under SB 35, a 2017 California law that seeks to mitigate the state's housing crisis by eliminating the requirement for local approval of certain kinds of developments that include housing. This proposal has been approved by the city. Advisory plans being developed by members of the community through a charrette would include 2,400 residential units and more retail space than Sand Hill's plan.

On December 1, 2018, Dynasty Seafood Restaurant, the final tenant without an exterior entrance, closed. Bay Club closed its doors in July 2019, leaving the entirety of the mall west of Wolfe Road (as well as the bridge over the road) vacant; all the remaining tenants occupy the smaller eastern portion of the mall.

=== Demolition ===
On October 11, 2018, Sand Hill initiated demolition of one parking garage of the mall, followed by demolition of the mall itself in six to nine months' time. In August 2019 (ten months after the start of demolition), Sand Hill demolished the other parking garage under the scope of the original permit (adjacent to the site of the first parking garage), and after receiving a new permit, began demolition of the majority of the mall west of Wolfe Road on August 12. On March 27, 2020, Sand Hill announced that demolition of the bridge over Wolfe Road would commence on March 30. Wolfe Road under the bridge was closed, with traffic detoured onto the mall's Perimeter Road. Due to reduced traffic caused by the COVID-19 pandemic, the demolition had minimal impact on local businesses. The demolition of the bridge was completed on April 8, 2020.

=== Permitting progress ===
On September 16, 2021, AB1174 was signed into law, which gives projects (like Vallco) using the special approval of SB35 more time to start construction to compensate for delays caused by lawsuits.

A new version of the project to redevelop the property was submitted in 2023 and finally approved in early 2024. It intends to have more housing, along with some office and retail, and could start construction later in 2024.
