= QubicaAMF =

Italian bowling equipment provider

QubicaAMF Worldwide
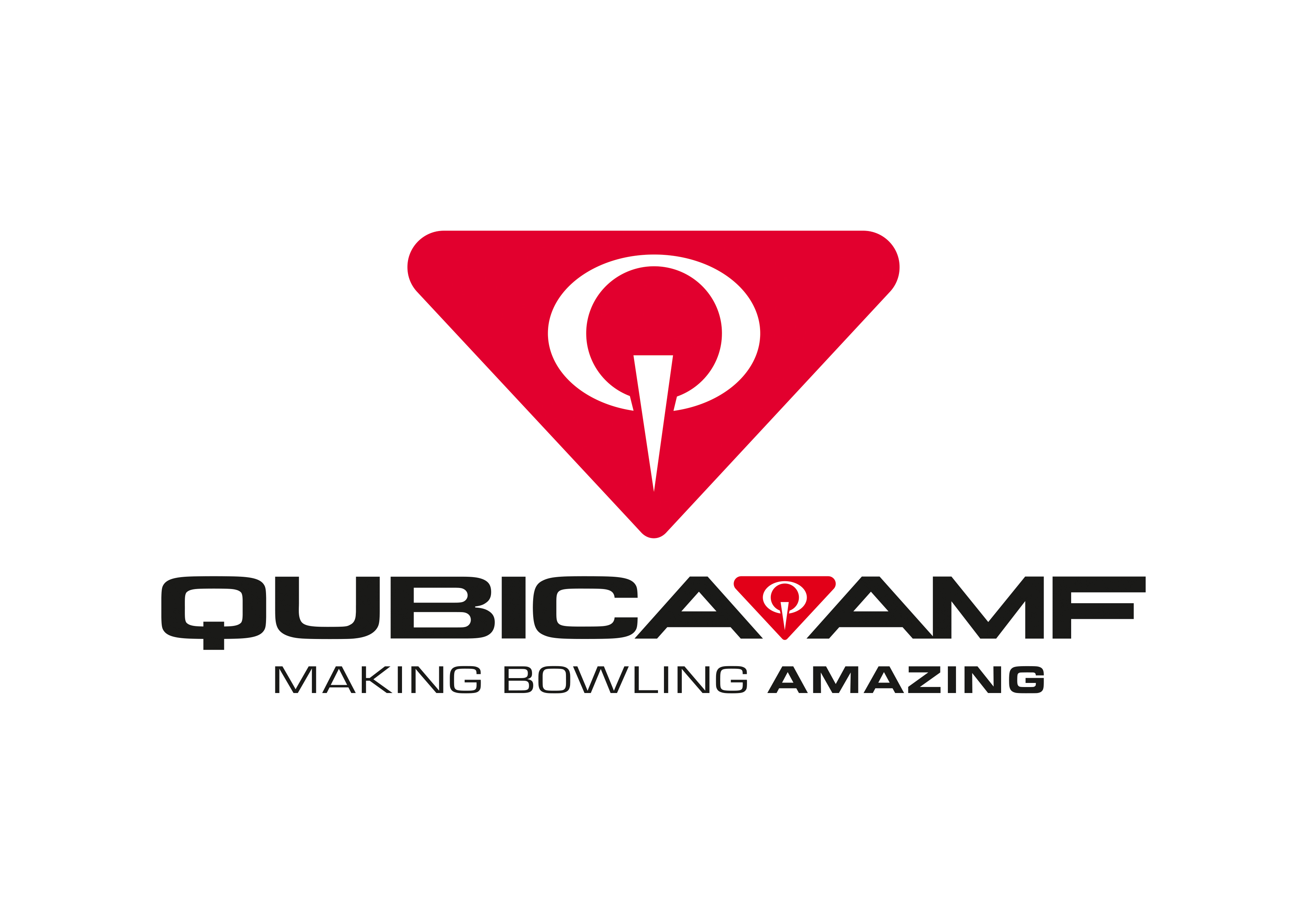
- Type: Private
- Predecessor: AMF Bowling, Qubica Worldwide
- Founded: June 14, 2005
- Headquarters: Mechanicsville, Virginia and Bologna, Italy
- Website: www.qubicaamfbowling.com

QubicaAMF Worldwide or QubicaAMF is a bowling equipment manufacturer and distributor. The company has U.S. headquarters in Richmond, Virginia and European headquarters in Bologna, Italy. It has a pin manufacturing plant in Lowville, New York, that manufactures bowling pins for multiple companies to distribute.

The company's mascot is an animated anthropomorphic bowling pin character named Qupee.

== History ==
Qubica S.p.A. was founded in Italy in 1993 by Roberto Vaioli, Luca Drusiani, and Emanuele Govoni to "bring amusement innovations to bowlers and center proprietors worldwide."

In 2003, Qubica acquired the Mendes company, a maker of pinsetters, ball returns, and automated scoring systems.

QubicaAMF Worldwide was formed in July 2005 when AMF Bowling Worldwide contributed the assets of its Bowling Products Division, and Qubica Lux S.à r.l. (successor owner of Qubica) contributed Qubica S.p.A. to a new joint venture of which each company retained 50% interest.

In March 2012, the joint venture entered into a non-binding offer with Bowltech International B.V. for the possible acquisition of the joint venture.

On July 1, 2013, AMF Bowling Worldwide was reorganized out of Chapter 11 bankruptcy and combined with Strike Holdings LLC (doing business as Bowlmor Lanes) to form Bowlmor AMF (now known as Lucky Strike Entertainment). On July 31, 2013, QubicaAMF Worldwide announced that it was no longer for sale, stating that, “Under the circumstances a year ago, a transaction with Bowltech presented a great opportunity for QubicaAMF. However, with the full support of our new ownership team, a transaction is no longer needed.”

In September 2013, the Qubica founders, as well as legacy partners Guido Sorba, Pat Ciniello, Frank Mascadri and Rich Albright, bought the remaining shares from the European private equity fund that co-owned Qubica, giving them 50% ownership of QubicaAMF. In December 2014, the Qubica founders and partners acquired the 50% owned by Bowlmor AMF (now known as Lucky Strike Entertainment), giving them 100% ownership of QubicaAMF.

In November 2016, QubicaAMF acquired CDE Software, a major developer and marketer of software to track leagues and tournaments.

== Products ==
QubicaAMF is an American company that manufactures bowling equipment. The bowling equipment includes pinspotters, automatic scoring systems, bowling lanes, mini-bowling lanes, duckpin bowling pins and lanes, ball returns & furniture.

QubicaAMF Products
Name	model	notes	Type of Bowling
BES NV	Automatic Scoring System	Current state-of-the-art scoring & entertainment system	
Highway66	Mini-Bowling	Used in Arcades & Big Childrens Playplace and has theming available	10 pin Bowling only
Neoverse	Immersive Entertainment & LED Wall	Multisensory experience, combining sight, sound, and sensation	10 pin Bowling only
Bowling Lanes	SPL Select and SPL Boutique Lanes	Used in new and renovated bowling alleys	10 pin Bowling only
EDGE String	Automatic string pinspotter (Pinsetter)	QubicaAMF's string pinsetter	10 pin Bowling only
EDGE Free Fall	Automatic Pinspotter (Pinsetter)	Similar to EDGE string but uses the sweepbar found on AMF 82-70 (SOME) and AMF 82-90 and is labeled QubicaAMF	10 pin Bowling only
Fly'n Ducks	Duckpin bowling option offered by QubicaAMF		
Harmony Furniture	Tables and seating for bowlers	Comfortable and functional furniture	all
Harmony Ball Returns	Ball Returns	Different from most ball returns because it has a button for operational reasons	10-pin Bowling only

A string pinsetter patent issued in 2024 to QubicaAMF Worldwide, LLC

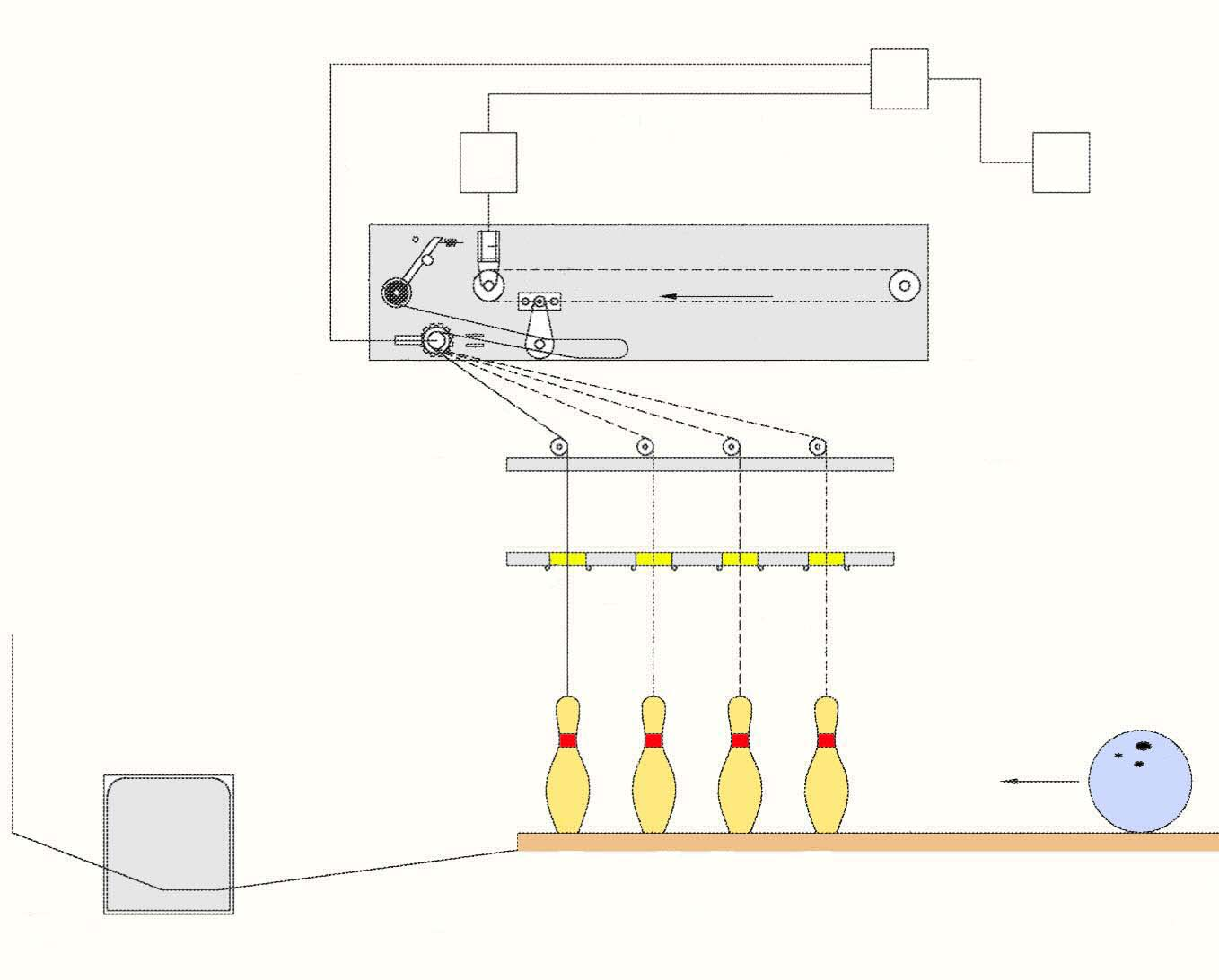
1) Ball approaches pins that strings have lowered into place.

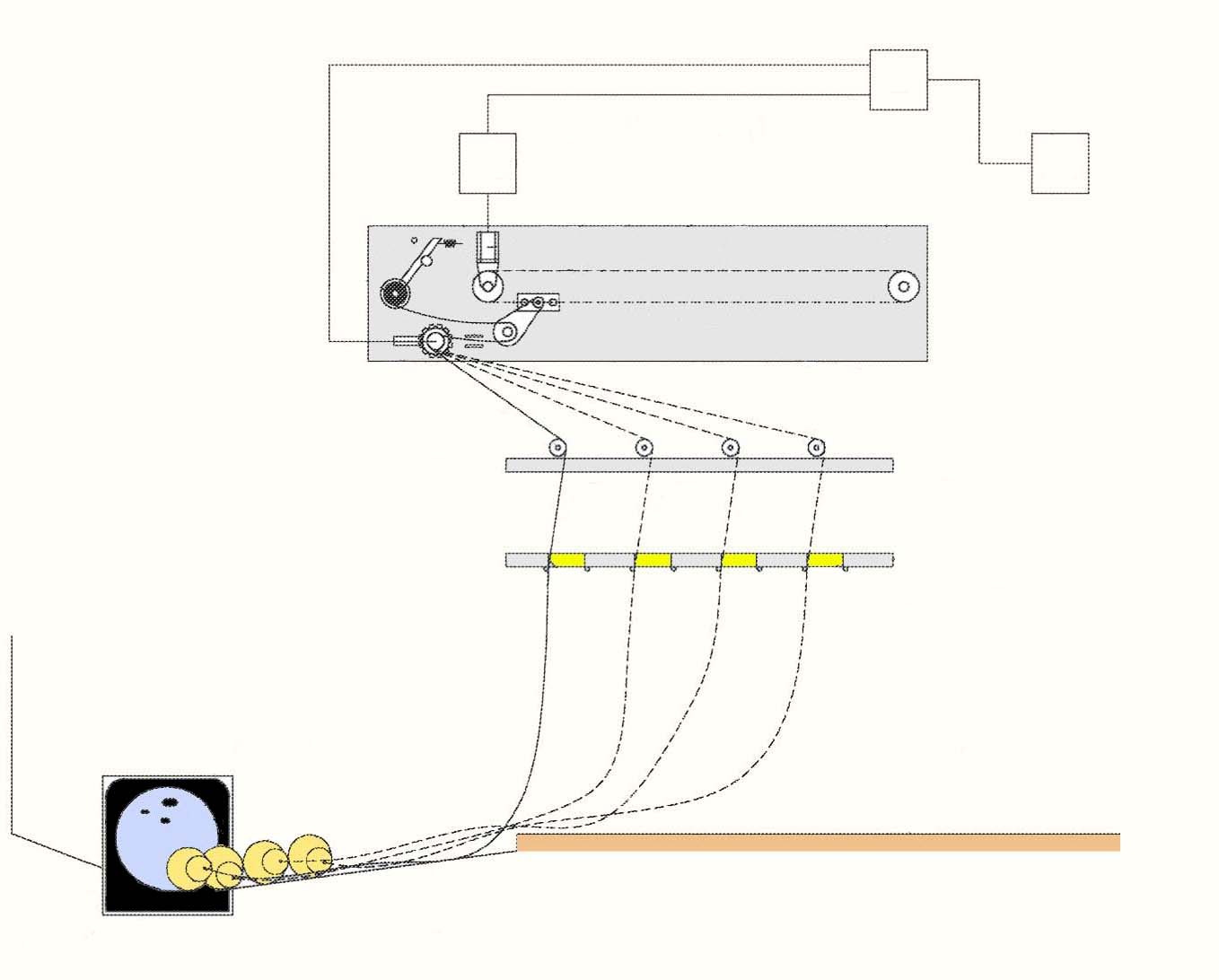
2) Ball knocks pins into a pit and exits to a ball return mechanism.

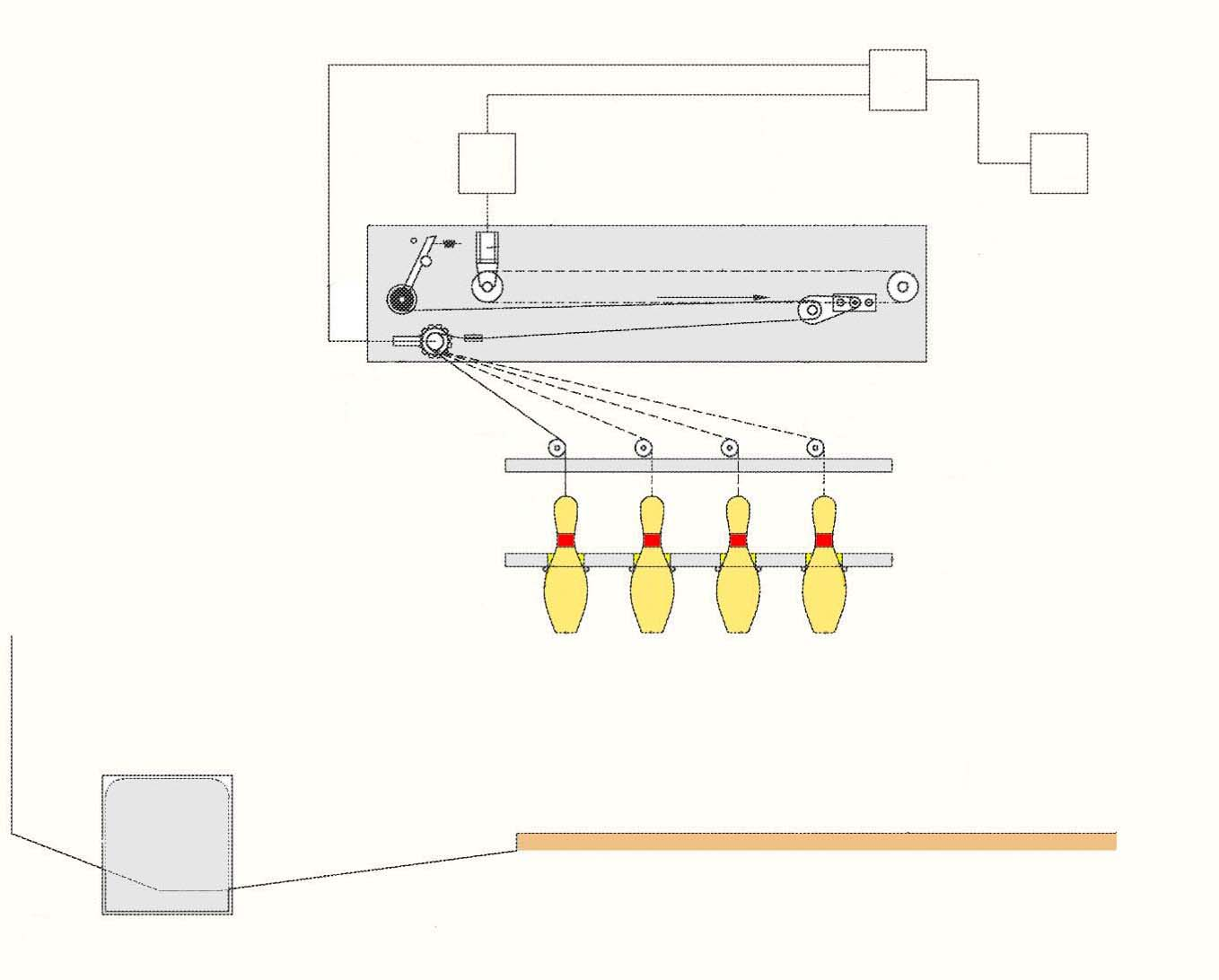
3) Strings retract the pins from the pit so they can be lowered into place.
