= Automatic scorer =

Scoring system for ten-pin bowling

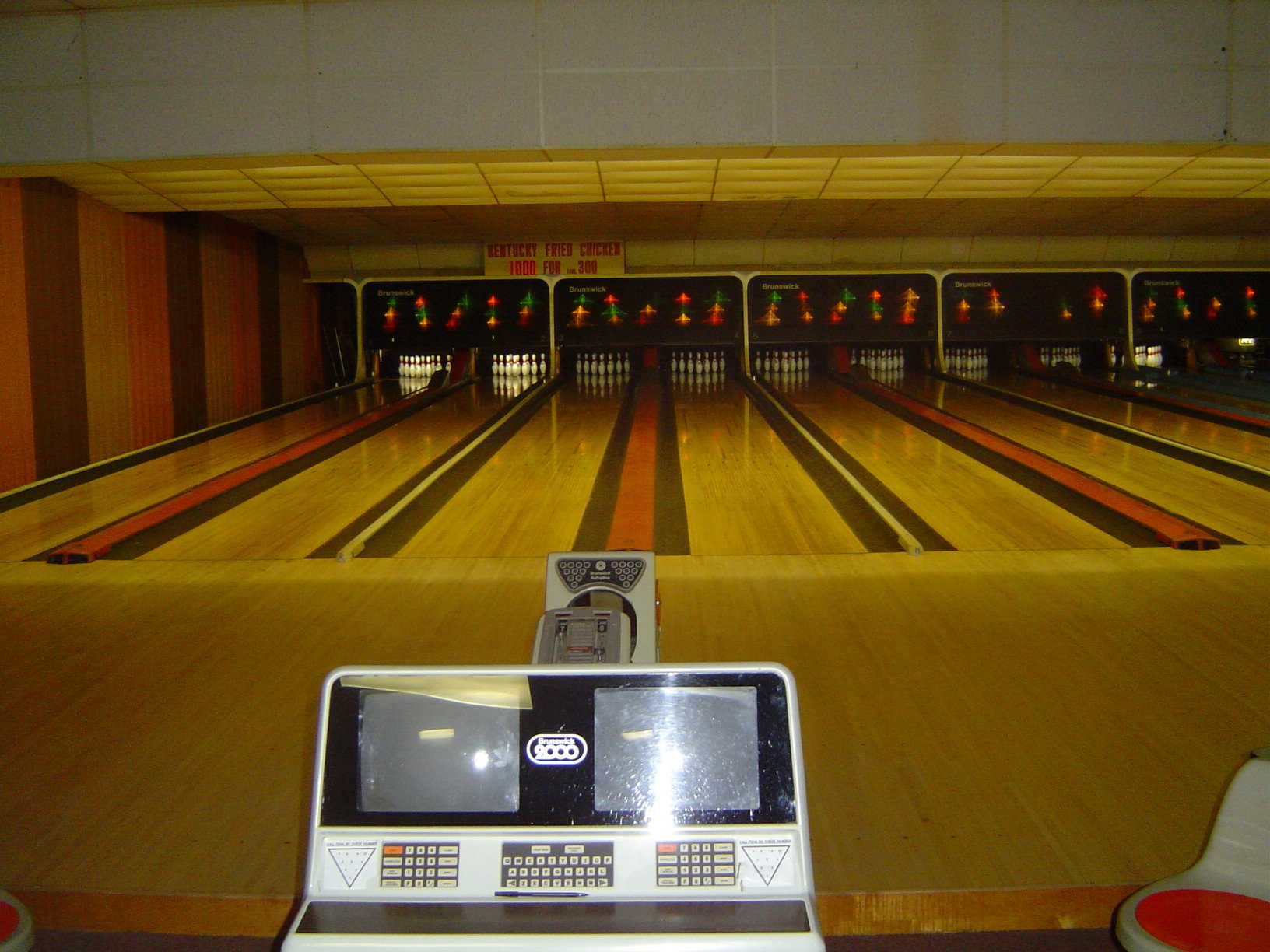
Pair of automatic scorers on desk in front of lane pair

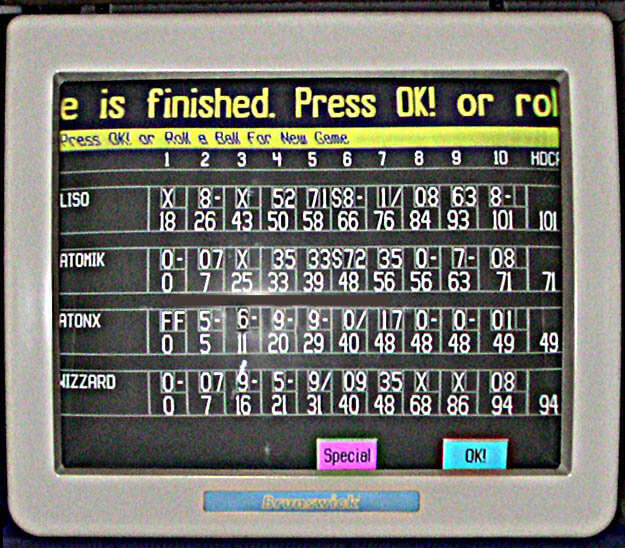
Detail of automatic scorer from an overhead display

An automatic scorer is the computerized scoring system to keep track of scoring in ten-pin bowling. It was introduced en masse in bowling alleys in the 1970s and combined with mechanical pinsetters to detect overturned pins.

By eliminating the need for manual score-keeping, these systems have introduced new bowlers into the game who otherwise would not participate because they had to count the score themselves, as many do not understand the mathematical formula involved in bowler scoring. At first, people were skeptical about whether a computer could keep an accurate score. In the twenty-first century, automatic scorers are used in most bowling centers around the world. The three manufacturers of these specialty computers have been Brunswick Bowling, AMF Bowling (later QubicaAMF), and RCA.

== History ==
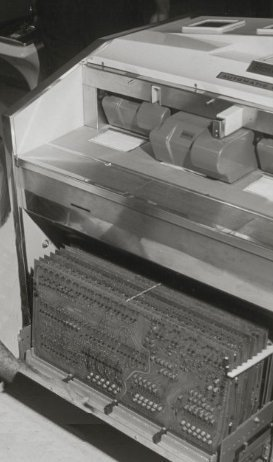
Inside 1970s computer console apparatus

Automatic equipment is considered a cornerstone of the modern bowling center. The traditional bowling center of the early 20th century was advanced in automation when the pinsetter person ("pin boy"), who set back up by hand the bowled down pins, was replaced by a machine that automatically replaced the pins in their proper play positions. This machine came out in the 1950s. A detection system was developed from the pinsetter mechanism in the 1960s that could tell which pins had been knocked down, and that information could be transferred to a digital computer.

Automatic electronic scoring was first conceived by Robert Reynolds, who was described by a newspaper story at the time as "a West Coast electronics calculator expert." He worked with the technical staff of Brunswick Bowling to develop it. The goal was realized in the late 1960s when a specialized computer was designed for the purpose of automatic scorekeeping for bowling. The field test for the automatic scorer took place at Village Lanes bowling center, Chicago in 1967. The scoring machine received approval for official use by the American Bowling Congress in August of that year. They were first used in national official league gaming on October 10, 1967. In November, Brunswick announced that they were accepting orders for the new digital computer, which cost around $3,000 per bowling lane. Bowling centers that installed these new automatic scoring devices in the 1970s charged a ten cents extra per line of scoring for the convenience.

== Description ==
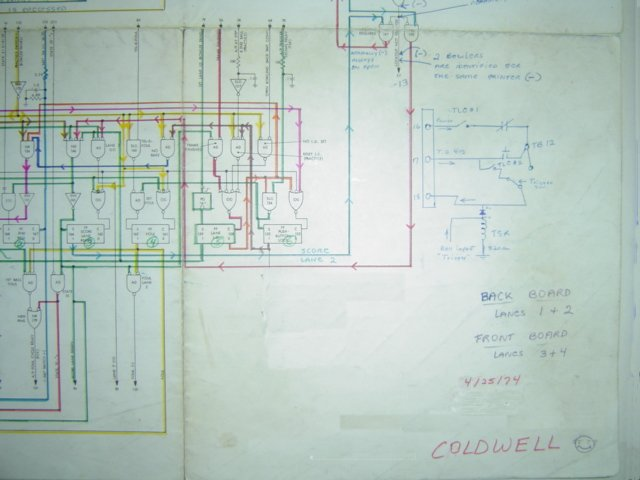
1970s circuit board schematic diagram showing electronic input system for tally

Each Automatic Scorer computer unit kept score for four lanes. It had two bowler identification panels serving two lanes each. The bowler pushed it into his named position when his turn came up so the computer knew who was bowling and score accordingly. After the bowler rolled the bowling ball down the lane and knocked down pins, the pinsetter detected which pins were down and relayed this information back to the computer for scoring. The result was then printed on a scoresheet and projected overhead onto a large screen for all to see.

The Automatic Scorer digital computer was mathematically accurate, however the detection system at the pinsetter mechanism sometimes reported the wrong number of pins knocked down. The computer could be corrected manually for any errors in the system; similarly, human errors, such as neglecting to move the bowler identification mechanism, could be corrected for by manual action. The scorer could take into account bowlers' handicaps and could adjust for late-arriving bowlers. The automatic scorer is directly connected to the foul detection unit. As a result, foul line violations are automatically scored.

Brunswick had put ten years of research and development into the Automatic Scorer, and by 1972 there were over 500 of these computers installed in bowling centers around the world. AMF Bowling, competitor to Brunswick, entered into the automatic scorer computer field during the 1970s and their systems were installed into their brand of bowling centers. By 1974, RCA was also making these computers for automatic scoring.

== Reception and further developments ==
The purposes of the computerized scoring were to avoid errors by human scorers and to prevent cheating. It had the side benefit of speeding up the progress of the game and introducing new bowlers to the game. Score-keeping for bowling is based on a formula that many new to bowling were not familiar with and thought difficult to learn. These casual bowlers unfamiliar with the formula thought the scores given by the computers were confusing. Some bowlers were not comfortable with automatic scorers when they were introduced in the 1970s, so kept score using the traditional method on paper score sheets.

The introduction of this device increased the popularity of the sport. Automatic scorers came to be considered a normal part of modern bowling installations worldwide, with owners and managers saying that bowlers expect such equipment to be present in bowling establishments and that business increased following their introduction. Brunswick introduced a color television style automatic scorer in 1983. Bowling center owners could use these style automatic scorers for advertising, management, videos, and live television.

By the 2010s, these types of electronic visual displays could show bowler avatars and social media connections to publicize the bowlers' scores. Some are capable of being extended entertainment systems of games for children and adults. Some scoring systems support variations on traditional bowling, such as different kinds of bingo games where certain pins have to be knocked down at certain times or practice regimes where certain spares have to be accomplished.

By this point, QubicaAMF Worldwide, an outgrowth of AMF, was one of the leading providers of bowling scoring equipment.
