= Spare (bowling) =

Bowling term

Attempts to convert the 4-5-7 split (right-handed delivery using pearl coverstock bowling ball). Ball approaches at an angle to give the 4-pin enough forward momentum to contact the 7-pin. However, splitting the 4-5 gap too evenly sends the 4-pin sideways toward the gutter without contacting the 7-pin.

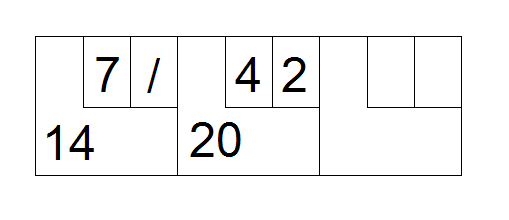
A ten-pin bowling score sheet showing how a spare is scored.

A spare is a term used in bowling to indicate that all of the pins have been knocked down during the second ball of a frame when not all the pins were knocked down in the first frame of that player's two turns. The symbol for a spare for most bowling sports is a forward slash mark (/), while the unique vertically-oriented scoring system for candlepin bowling is somewhat different.

Though bowling scores are generally linearly proportional to strike frequency, there is substantial variance based on whether the strikes are consecutive, and based on the number of open frames versus spares. In this dataset, such variance can approach 90 pins per set (30 pins per game), shown by the vertical extent of the shaded bar.

A "spare" is awarded when no pins are left standing after the second ball of a frame; i.e., a player uses both balls of a frame to clear all ten pins. A player achieving a spare is awarded ten points, plus a bonus of whatever is scored with the next ball (only the first ball is counted). It is typically rendered as a slash on score sheets in place of the second pin count for a frame.

Example:

Frame 1, ball 1: 7 pins
Frame 1, ball 2: 3 pins (spare)
Frame 2, ball 1: 4 pins
Frame 2, ball 2: 2 pins
The total score from these throws is: 7 + 3 + 4(bonus) + 4 + 2 = 20, while the score for Frame 1 is 14.

A player who bowls a spare in the tenth (final) frame is awarded one extra ball to allow for the bonus points.

Correctly calculating bonus points can be difficult and time-consuming, especially when combinations of strikes and spares come in consecutive frames. In modern times, however, this has been overcome with automated scoring systems (also known as score keepers), linked to the machines that set and clear the pins between frames. A computer automatically counts pins that remain standing, and fills in a virtual score sheet (usually displayed on monitors above each lane). However, even the automated system is not fool-proof, as the computer can miscount the number of pins that remain standing.

The term "hard spare" refers when no pins are knocked down on the first ball, due to a foot foul or a ball thrown into the gutter, and then a spare is converted with all ten pins remaining with the second ball. This is sometimes mocked as throwing a strike one ball too late.

Since throwing three strikes in a row is referred to as a "turkey," three spares in a row is most commonly referred to as a “sparrow."

Margins of error for spares

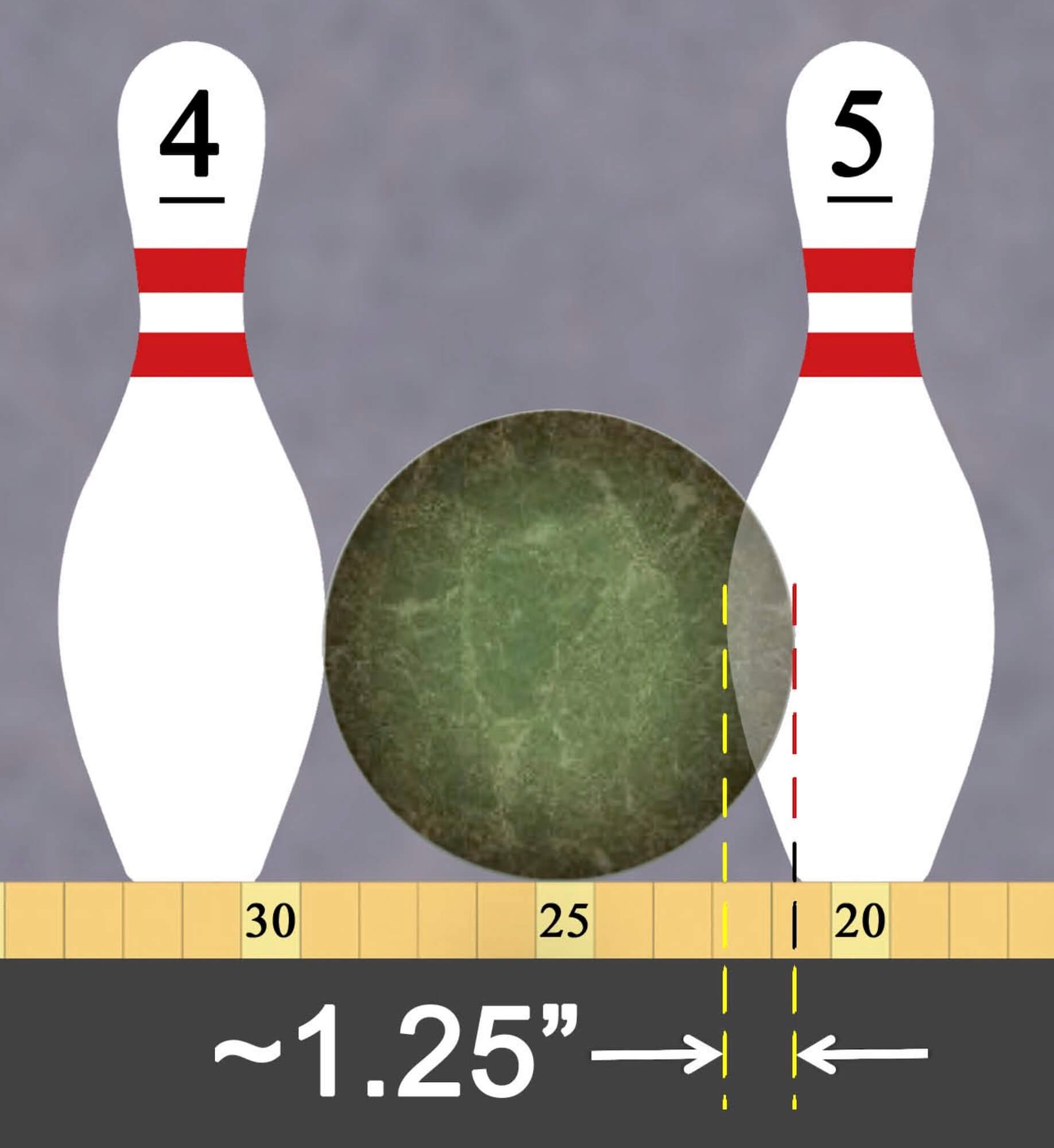
Split: The margin for error in converting same-row splits is about 1.25 inches (3.2 cm).

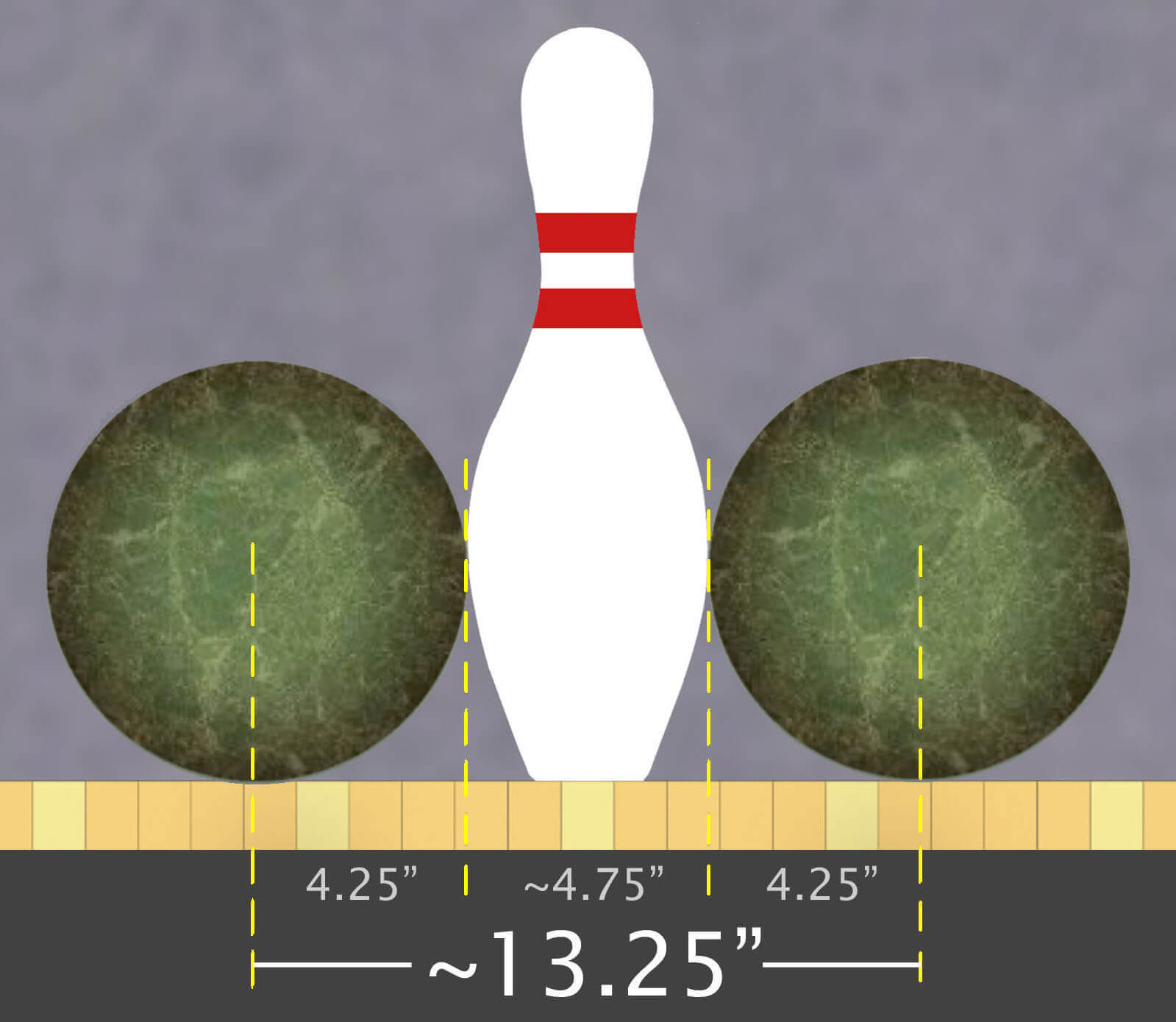
Single-pin spare: Margin for error for converting a single-pin spare: balls thrown outside a range of about 13.25 inches (33.7 cm) will miss.

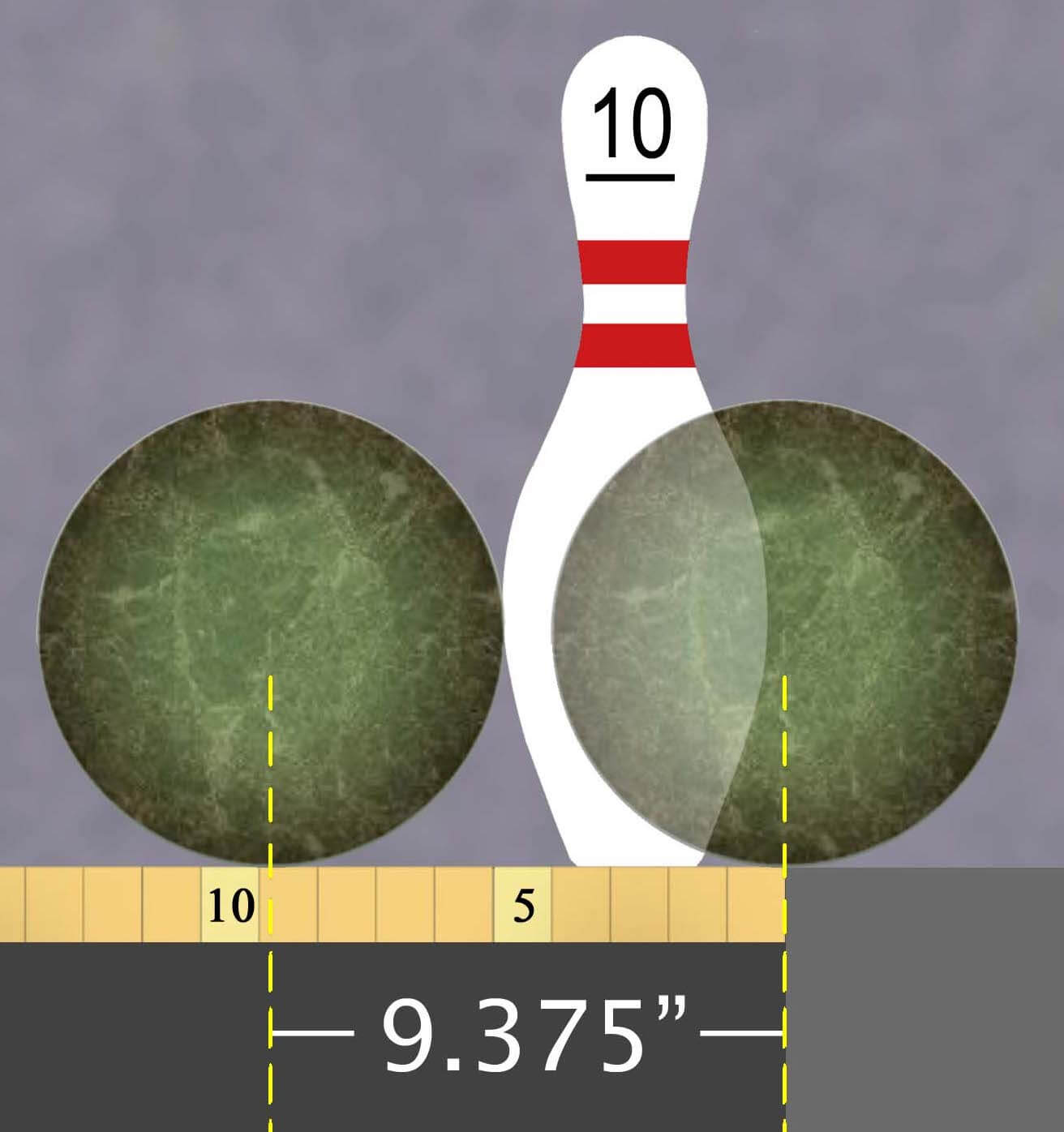
Corner pin spare: Because the 10-pin is located close to the gutter, the range of success is smaller, about 9.375 inches (23.81 cm).
