= Lucky Strike Lanes =

American chain of bowling alleys

Lucky Strike
- Industry: Entertainment
- Founded: 2003; 23 years ago
- Founder: Steven Foster; Gillian Foster; Kevin Troy
- Headquarters: Sherman Oaks, Los Angeles, California, U.S.
- Area served: North America
- Services: Bowling alley Arcade games Billiards; Sports bar
- Owner: Lucky Strike Entertainment Corporation
- Website: www.luckystrikeent.com

Lucky Strike is a bowling alley chain owned and operated by Lucky Strike Entertainment Corporation.

In 2023, the chain was sold by its former parent company, Lucky Strike Entertainment, LLC, to the former Bowlero Corporation, which adopted the Lucky Strike name.

== History ==
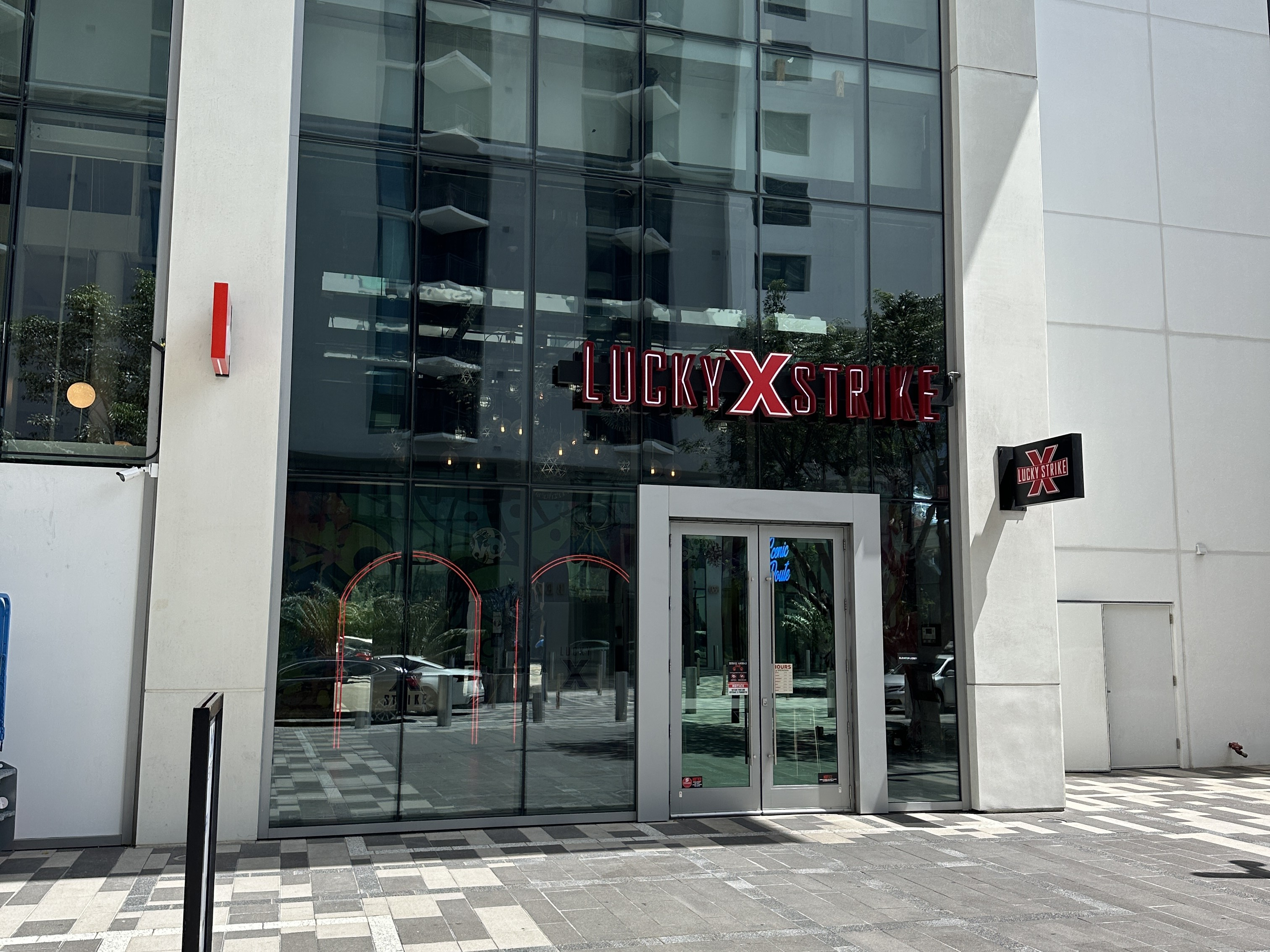
Lucky Strike entrance at Miami Worldcenter in 2025

In 2008, the Hollywood branch of Lucky Strike was used in Episode 5, Season 11 of America's Next Top Model; the marquee bearing the name of the alley was clearly visible as the contestants walked in. In the episode, Jay Alexander presided over a "teach"--a learning session in which the contestants were asked to perform a runway walk along a lane of the bowling alley.

In 2010, the company and CEO Steven Foster were subjects of an episode of CBS's Undercover Boss.

In July, 2023, Lucky Strike agreed to be sold to Bowlero Corporation, with the deal to close in the later half of 2023.

The deal was officially closed on September 18, 2023.
