= Bowling league =

Competitive bowling event

The number of sanctioned perfect (300) games per league bowler has increased substantially since the 1990s. Freeman and Hatfield posit that the increase in perfect games is due to factors such as the introduction of reactive resin coverstocks, asymmetric ball cores, synthetic lane surfaces, and precision lane oiling machines.

A bowling league is a competitive event in which teams bowl against each other over the course of a season.

Most bowling leagues consist of four-player teams that meet up once a week or once every other week, usually at the same day and time. Teams of three or five players are also common. Leagues can be set up as male-only, female-only, or mixed. Four-person teams tend to be used in mixed leagues, while three- and five-player teams are more common in male-only and female-only leagues.

Leagues were established soon after the most modern types of bowling were created in the late 1800s. Leagues may be organized by bowling alleys, or started up by people with a connection outside of bowling such as company, church, or labor union leagues.

Each session, each team in the league faces one other team. In most bowling leagues, each team plays three games per scheduled match. The players on a team usually bowl in a specific order and across two lanes, switching lanes after every frame. This way the bowlers on each team are equally exposed to favorable or unfavorable lane conditions.

After the first week of the league, the average for each player is set, and the average can go up or down after each subsequent session as more games are bowled. Though there are "scratch" leagues where only actual score counts, most leagues use the bowler averages to determine team and/or individual handicaps. The handicap is the difference of the sum of averages between the two teams that are facing each other (sometimes then multiplied by a percentage, such as 90%), or an amount calculated from a score that is above the highest team average in the league so that each team gets a handicap amount. The handicap gives teams with lower averages a chance to compete against teams with higher averages.

While some leagues have a casual attitude towards the rules, other leagues are fiercely competitive. For example, a player that commits a foul might provoke a heated confrontation with other bowlers if he or she does not declare the required zero score for the throw. Another common dispute may be over a player intentionally establishing a lower average early in the season (known as "sandbagging") to increase individual handicap or his/her team's handicap.

USBC membership has declined, indicating waning league participation in the U.S.

Same data, normalized to 1997 values to show relative change in lanes, centers and membership.

The average number of lanes per bowling center has trended upward slightly during this time period.

In about 2015, U.S. bowling center employment reversed a long decline, which some attribute to their diversification into more broad-based entertainment centers.

There are often weekly and seasonal cash prizes, along with betting pools that go along with the game. The point of this is to have something to work for in addition to friendly competition. Some leagues will have strike pools or spare pools. This is when team members put in money to play the game. The first person to get a certain number of strikes or spares wins the total amount of money that everyone put in. Some teams play a side poker game in which a player draws a card only after making a strike or spare; best poker hand at the end of each game wins. In some cases, tickets are sold for a league strike jackpot. A ticket is drawn each week and the bowler holding that ticket must roll a strike to win the jackpot. If no one wins it in one week, then the money carries over to the next week until someone finally gets a strike. Other common jackpots are high scratch game, high handicap game, high over-average game, and "mystery" game (where a score is drawn and anyone whose game matched that score wins a prize).

Bowling leagues normally attract an adult crowd, whether it is duckpin, candlepin, or ten-pin bowling. However youth bowling leagues are also common, particularly on weekend afternoons.

== League scoring ==
Leagues normally consist of weekly sessions that require each bowler on a team to bowl three games per week (or more/less depending on the league's rules). Some leagues have special prize funds accumulated by a small weekly fee (above that which is paid to the bowling center) that can fund prizes at the end of the season.

In a given weekly session, each team will face another team in the league in scheduled competition. Teams are awarded point(s) for winning each game, plus point(s) for having more total pins than the other team at the end of all games that week. Point systems vary by league.

League standings are published after each session, and teams with more points at the end of a season (or end of a half in split seasons) generally win the most money or a special prize.
