= Bowlers Journal International =

American bowling magazine

- Categories: Sports magazine
- Frequency: Monthly
- Founded: 1913
- Country: United States
- Based in: Chicago
- Language: English
- Website: www.bowlersjournal.com
- ISSN: 1095-0435

Bowlers Journal International is a monthly magazine in Chicago, Illinois, dedicated to Ten-pin bowling. Founded as the Bowlers Journal in 1913 by David A. "Dave" Luby (1857–1925), there are now both online and print versions.

It is akin to the British Tenpin Bowling Association's Go Tenpin magazine.
