= Brunswick =

Brunswick is the historical English name for the German city of Braunschweig (Low German: Brunswiek, Braunschweig dialect: Bronswiek).

Brunswick may also refer to:

== Places and other topographs ==
=== Australia ===
- Brunswick, Victoria, a suburb of Melbourne
  - Brunswick railway station, Melbourne
- Electoral district of Brunswick, an electoral district in Victoria
- Brunswick Junction, a town near Bunbury
  - Brunswick Junction railway station
- Brunswick Heads, a town on the North Coast of New South Wales
- Brunswick River (New South Wales)
- Brunswick River (Western Australia)

=== Canada ===
- New Brunswick, province in the Maritimes
  - Brunswick Parish, New Brunswick, in Queens County
- Brunswick Mountain, North Shore Mountains, British Columbia
- Brunswick House First Nation, Ontario

=== Chile ===
- Brunswick Peninsula

=== Germany ===
- Braunschweig, city in Lower Saxony whose name was historically Brunswiek, anglicised as Brunswick
- Brunswick Land, loosely defined area around the city
- Historical polities centred on the city of Braunschweig:
  - County of Brunswick, Saxon vassal up to 1235
  - Duchy of Brunswick-Lüneburg (1235–1806), some of whose branch principalities also had Brunswick in their names:
    - Brunswick-Bevern (1666–1735)
    - Brunswick-Calenberg (1485–1692/1708)
    - Brunswick-Celle (1269–1705)
    - Brunswick-Göttingen (1279–1463)
    - Brunswick-Grubenhagen (1291–1596)
    - Brunswick-Wolfenbüttel (1269–1815), became the Duchy of Brunswick
  - Electorate of Brunswick-Lüneburg (1692/1708–1814), became the Kingdom of Hanover
  - Duchy of Brunswick (1815–1918)
  - Free State of Brunswick (1918–1946)
  - Braunschweig (region) (1978–2004)

=== United Kingdom ===
- Brunswick, Hove, East Sussex, England
- Brunswick railway station, Liverpool
- Brunswick, Manchester, an inner-city area of south Manchester, England, between Ardwick and Chorlton-on-Medlock
- Brunswick, Tyne and Wear, England
  - Brunswick Village, England
- Brunswick, West Midlands, England

=== United States ===
==== Counties ====
- Brunswick County, North Carolina
- Brunswick County, Virginia

==== Towns and Census-designated places ====
- Brunswick, Georgia, in Glynn County
- Brunswick, Indiana, in Lake County
- Brunswick, Clay County, Indiana
- Brunswick, Maine, in Cumberland County
  - Brunswick (CDP), Maine, census-designated place
  - Brunswick Station, Maine, former census-designated place
  - Naval Air Station Brunswick
- Brunswick, Maryland, in Frederick County
- Brunswick, Minnesota, in Kanabec County
- Brunswick, Missouri, in Chariton County
- New Brunswick, New Jersey, in Middlesex County
- Brunswick, New York, in Rensselaer County
- Brunswick, North Carolina, in Columbus County
- Brunswick, Ohio, in Medina County
- Brunswick, Wisconsin, in Eau Claire County
- Brunswick, Vermont, in Essex County

==== Townships ====
- Brunswick Township, Kanabec County, Minnesota, in Kanabec County
- Brunswick Township, Chariton County, Missouri
- East Brunswick Township, New Jersey, in Middlesex County
- North Brunswick Township, New Jersey, in Middlesex County
- South Brunswick Township, New Jersey, in Middlesex County
- East Brunswick Township, Pennsylvania
- West Brunswick Township, Pennsylvania
- Brunswick Hills Township, Ohio

==== Villages ====
- Brunswick, Michigan, in Muskegon County
- Brunswick, Nebraska, in Antelope County
- Brunswick, Tennessee, in Shelby County
- Brunswick, Virginia, in Nottoway County

==== Other ====
- Brunswick (Gary), a neighborhood in Gary, Indiana
- Brunswick River (Georgia)
- Brunswick River (North Carolina)
- Brunswick Town State Historic Site, a historic ghost town in Brunswick County, North Carolina
- Brunswick School, all- boys preparatory school in Greenwich, Connecticut

== People ==
- Brunswick-Bevern, extinct German dynasty
- Dawson Brunswick, American politician
- John Moses Brunswick (1818–1886), founder of Brunswick Corporation
- Léon Brunschvicg (1869–1944), French philosopher
- Otto IV of Brunswick or Otto IV, Holy Roman Emperor (1175 or 1176–1218) ruler of the Holy Roman Empire
- Charles William Ferdinand, Duke of Brunswick-Wolfenbüttel (1735-1806), the "Duke of Brunswick", famous for the Battle of Auerstedt
- Frederick William, Duke of Brunswick-Wolfenbüttel (1771–1815), "The Black Duke", fought with the Duke of Wellington against Napoleon
- Hieronymus Brunschwig (c. 1450–c. 1512) German surgeon, alchemist, and botanist
- Roger E. Brunschwig (1891–1972), decorated colonel, activist

== Companies ==
- Brunswick Corporation, an American industrial conglomerate
  - Brunswick Boat Group, an American boat manufacturer
- Brunswick Group, a British public relations company
- Brunswick Records, an American record manufacturer and distributor

== Ships ==
- Brunswick (ship), six merchant and whaling ships
- HMS Brunswick, three ships of the British Royal Navy
- USS Brunswick, four ships of the United States Navy

== Other ==
- Brunswick (clothing), jacket-and-petticoat costume of the 18th century
- Brunswick Black, an old name for Japan black
- Brunswick Green, a dark shade
- Brunswick Manifesto, issued during the French Revolutionary Wars
- Brunswick stew
- Black Brunswickers, German volunteer corps in the Napoleonic Wars

== See also ==
- Brunsvigia
- Brunswik
- Brunšvik
- Braunschweig (disambiguation)
- Alfred Brunswig (1877–1929), a German philosopher
- Ronnie Brunswijk (1962–), Surinamese rebel leader
