= Brunswick (ship) =

Several ships have been named Brunswick.

- Brunswick (1791 ship) was launched on the Thames as a West Indiaman. She later carried immigrants from Ireland to Quebec and spent much of her career sailing between Britain and Canada, though she traded to other destinations as well. She was last listed in 1850.
- Brunswick (1791 Greenock ship), of 624 tons (bm), was launched by James and William Scott, of Greenock. At the time she was the largest ship built in Scotland. In 1794, Brunswick, Milne, master, recaptured Jenny, of Cork, Marshall, master, and sent her into Glasgow. Jenny had been sailing to Oporto when the French frigate Thames had captured her. Brunswick, Milne, master, had acquired a letter of marque on 21 March 1793. She may have been taken by a privateer in late 1796, while sailing from Antigua to St John's, Newfoundland. She was last listed in Lloyd's Register in the volume for 1797.
- Brunswick (1792 EIC ship) was launched as an East Indiaman for the EIC. She made five complete voyages for the EIC before the French captured her in 1805. Shortly thereafter she wrecked at the Cape of Good Hope.
- Brunswick (1795 ship) was launched at Newcastle. She made one voyage under charter to the EIC. She then traded primarily as a West Indiaman until she foundered in 1809.
- Brunswick (1814 ship) was launched at Paull, Hull. She initially was a Greenland whaler. Her owner withdrew her from the northern whale fishery in 1836 and then deployed her sailing to New York and Sierra Leone. She was apparently on a voyage to India when she was wrecked.
- Brunswick (1827 ship) was launched in Maine. She completed twelve whaling voyages before CSS Shenandoah burnt her in the Bering Strait in June 1865 on Brunswick's 13th voyage.
- Brunswick (1829 ship) was launched at Hull as an East Indiaman. She sailed to India several times under a license from the EIC and was wrecked in 1832 while returning from India.

== See also ==
- HMS Brunswick: one of three vessels
- USS Brunswick: one of four vessels
