= Braunschweiger =

Braunschweiger may refer to:

- Braunschweiger (sausage), the name for several types of sausages
- Braunschweiger Kammermusikpodium, classical music festival held in Lower Saxony, Germany
- Braunschweiger Land, region in Lower Saxony, Germany
- Braunschweiger Mumme, alcoholic beer from Braunschweig, Germany
- Braunschweiger Schloss, palace in Braunschweig, Germany
- Braunschweiger Schultheaterwoche, German theatre festival
- Braunschweiger Zeitung, German newspaper

== People ==
- Braunschweiger Monogrammist, anonymous 16th-century Netherlandish painter
- Alfred Braunschweiger (1885–1952), German diver
- Amy Braunschweiger, American freelance writer

== See also ==
- Braunschweig (disambiguation)
