= Walton Pier =

Pleasure pier in Walton-on-the-Naze

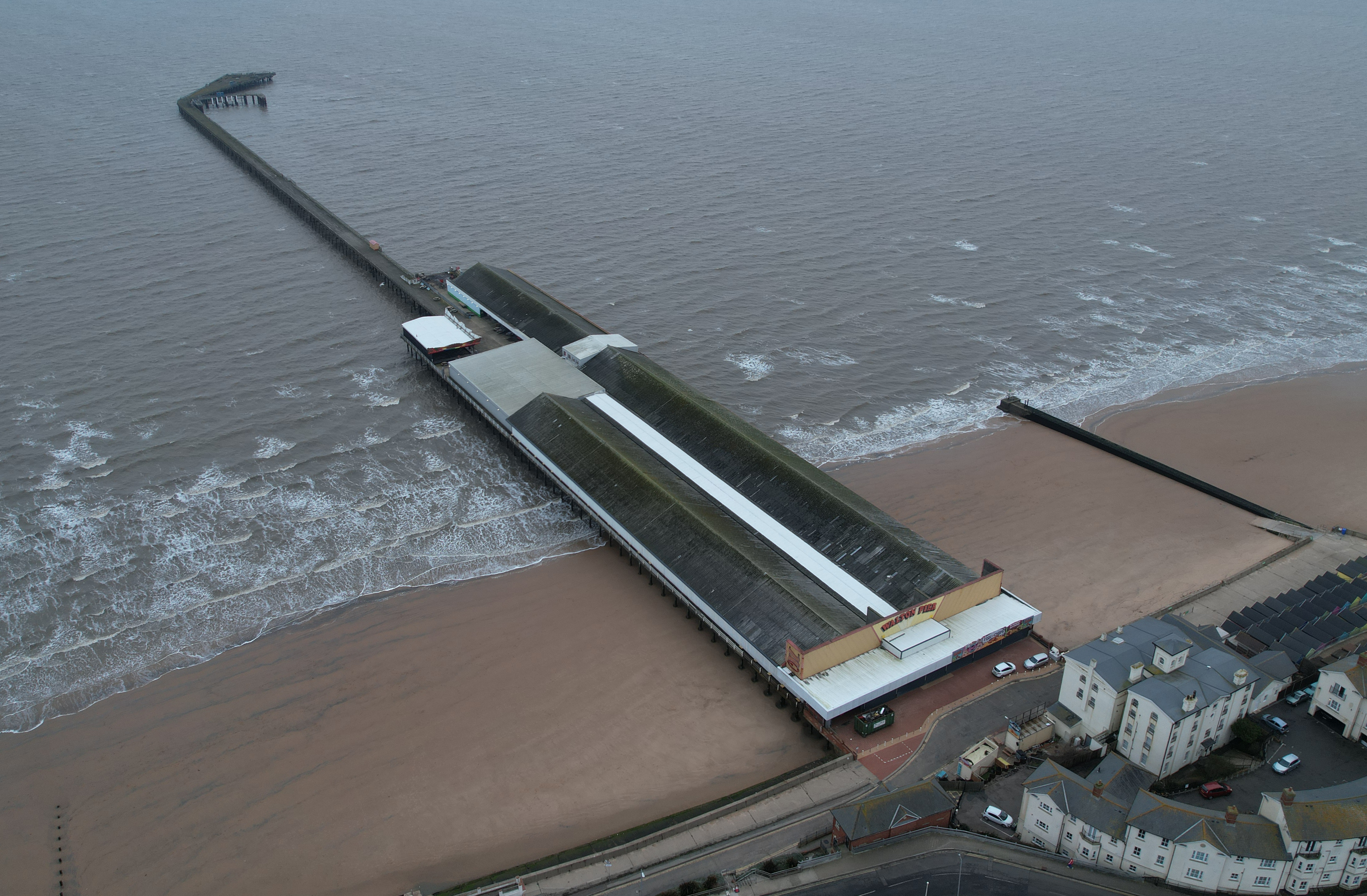
- Walton Pier in 2026
- Type: Amusement pier
- Spans: North Sea
- Location: Walton-on-the-Naze
- Coordinates: 51.8456°N 1.2745°E
- Owner: New Walton Pier Company
- Maintained by: New Walton Pier Company
- Website: waltonpier.uk

Characteristics
- Total length: 795.5 metres (2,610 ft)

History
- Constructor: Coast Development Corporation
- Opening date: 1895

Pier and Harbour Orders Confirmation Act 1864
- Act of Parliament
- Parliament of the United Kingdom
- Long title: An Act for confirming certain Provisional Orders made by the Board of Trade under The General Pier and Harbour Act, 1861, relating to Brighton, Eastbourne, Sandown, Walton-on-the-Naze, Clevedon, Rhyl, Bray, Kircubbin, Walton (Suffolk), Holywood, Exe Bight, Lytham, Ardglass, Filey, Greenock, Carlingford Lough, Wexford, Torquay, and Oban.
- Citation: 27 & 28 Vict. c. 93

Dates
- Royal assent: 29 July 1864
Other legislation
Relates to	General Pier and Harbour Act 1861

Text of statute as originally enacted

Walton Pier is a pier located in the town of Walton-on-the-Naze in England. It is the third longest pier in the UK at 795.5 metres (2,610 ft), although about half of the pier (including the pierhead) is currently inaccessible to the public since a partial collapse in 2021 and further damage in 2024.

The shore end of the pier hosts various amusements and food outlets.

== History ==
=== Previous piers ===
The first pier on the site was built around 1830, and was 155 feet (47 m) in length. The pier was wooden and initially used for landing goods and passengers on steamers to Walton. The pier was extended to 330 feet (100 m) in 1848 and extended further to 800 feet (240 m) some years later.

Around 1869 Peter Bruff began building a second wooden pier which was completed in 1871. This meant that for a short time there were two piers in Walton known to locals as the 'old pier' and the 'new pier'. The 'old pier' was heavily damaged during a storm in January 1882 and never repaired.

=== Current Pier ===
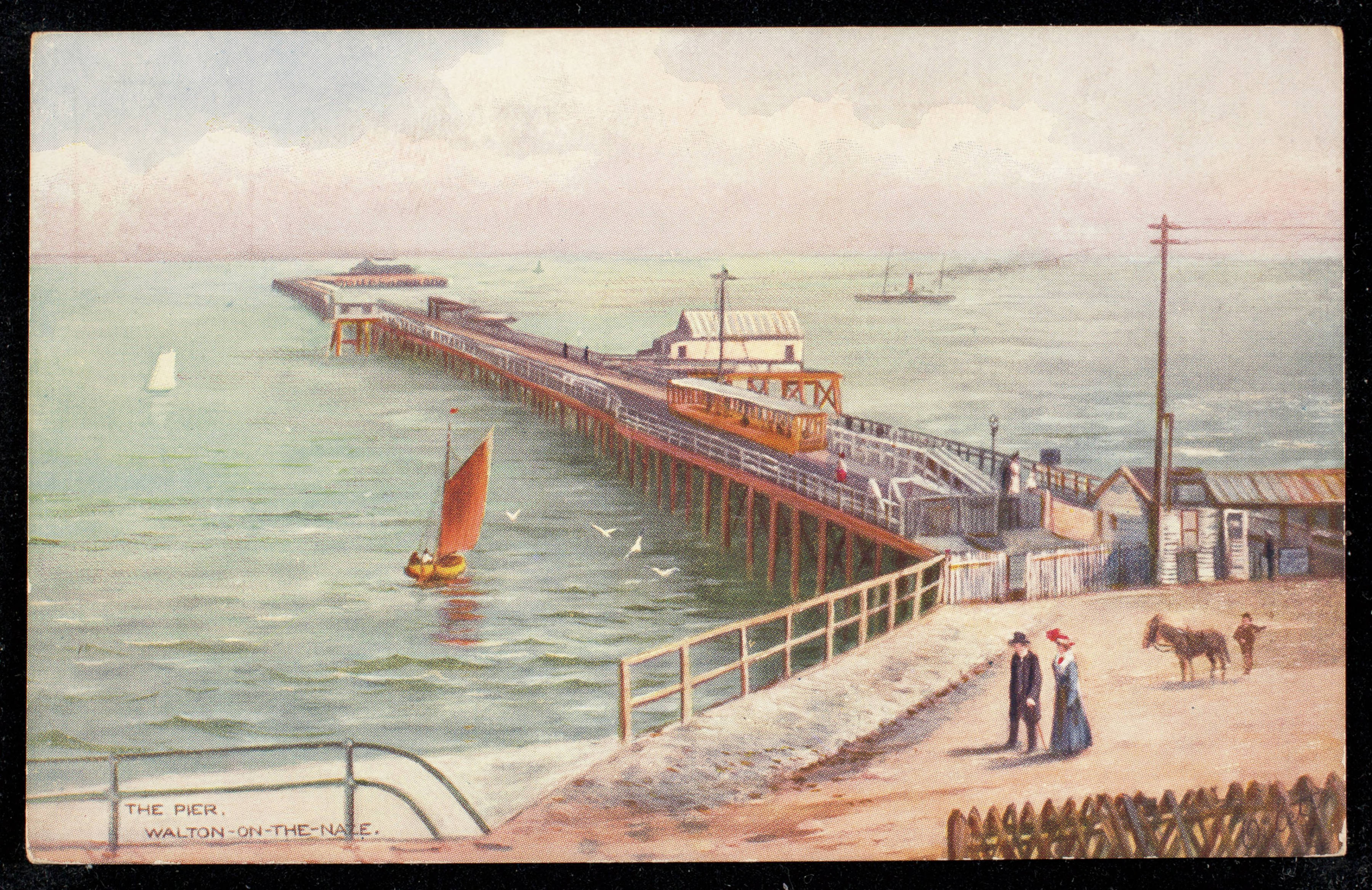
A postcard from the beginning of the 20th century depicting Walton Pier

In August 1897 work began on a new iron pier that was considered at the time to be extension to the existing pier. The pier was designed by John Penrice and Peter Bruff and construction carried out by The Coast Development Company. The new pier was completed a year later in 1898 extending the pier to 2,610 feet (800 m), making it the third longest pier in the country and earning its nickname the 'half-mile pier'. The extension allowed for steamers to call at the pier at all states of the tide. There was a grand opening ceremony for the new pier extension on 18 August which was attended by thousands of people including the mayors of Colchester, Chelmsford and Southend as well as the chairman of the Great Eastern Railway. The new pier was fitted with a single track electric railway of 3 feet 6 inches (1,070 mm) gauge, powered from a centre rail. The rails ran the length of the pier along the north side all the way to the pier head. Rolling stock consisted of three open-sided carriages, each seating 32 passengers.

On the 26th August 1898, Frances McLearon (wife of the then Mayor of Harwich) drowned after falling from the pier. In 1908 the attendant for the shooting saloon, Thomas Pearce, killed himself on the pier using a rifle from the saloon. The incident occurred after a fight with his brother. In 1934 the crew of a dutch cargo vessel lost control of their vessel and it crashed into the pier several times. There was a small fire in the Sea Spray Lounge at the shore end of the pier in December 1935 but the damage was not great.

In 1935 the existing railway was removed and replaced with an unusual battery powered system that may have been unique to Walton Pier. The new system was made up of a single carriage that seated 20 passengers. The carriage had six wheels and moved along a 6 ft wide wooden trough that acted as a steering guide for the carriage. The carriage could be driven from either end to avoid having to turn it around at each end of the pier.

In 1937, the pier and battery car was bought by Charles Goss, who formed the New Walton Pier Company. At the time, the pier featured a pavilion at the seaward end, an amusement arcade, a tent that served as a theatre, and the Seaspray Lounge.

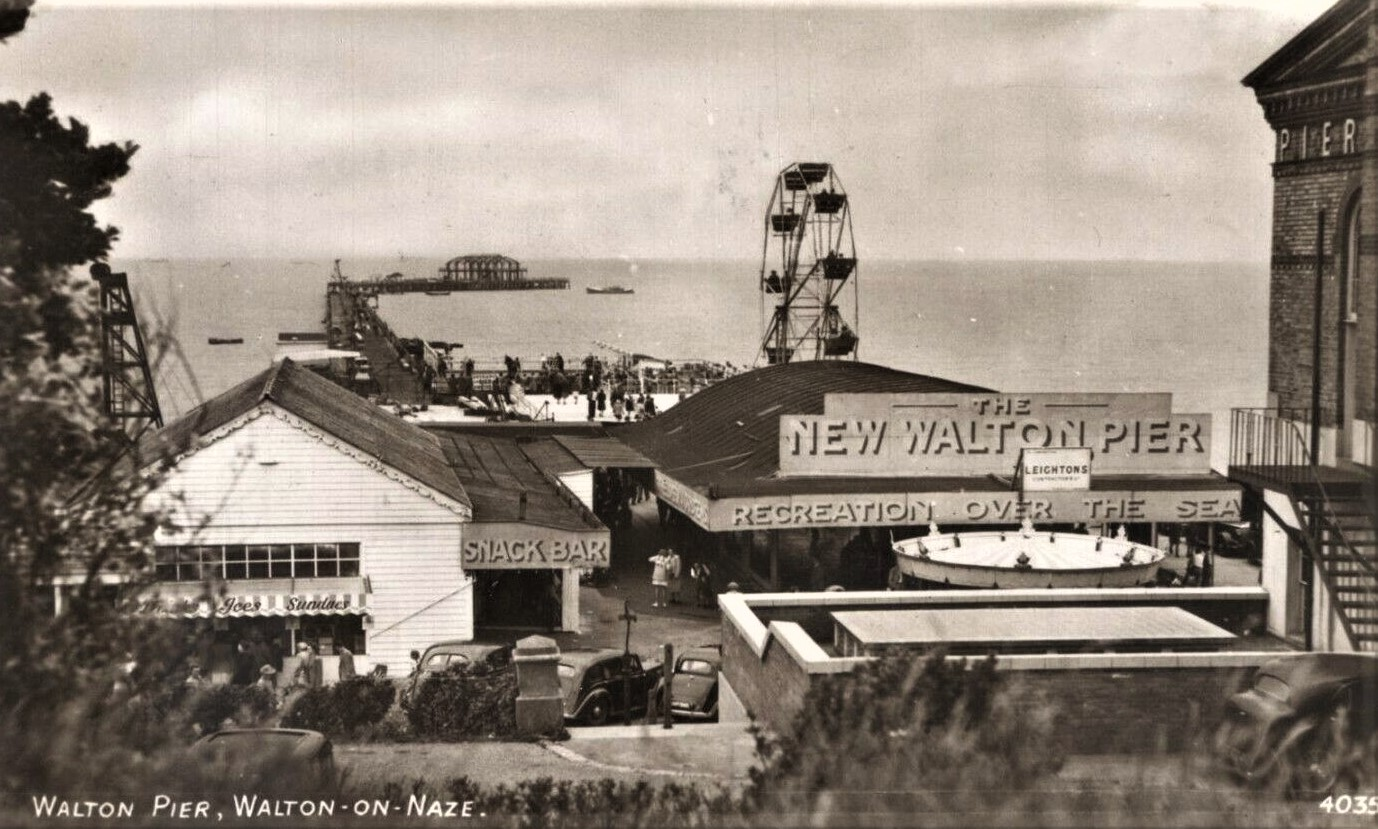
A postcard from the 1940s showing Walton Pier

On 30 May 1942 a fire severely damaged the pier and destroyed the battery-powered carriage. Buildings at both ends of the pier were damaged in the fire. The pier was not rebuilt until after the Second World War. During construction a 2 ft gauge line was built for contractors to move material. Prior to the pier reopening in 1948, the contractor's line was adapted for carrying passengers. The new locomotive used a Ford petrol-powered engine built by E.E Baguley Ltd and was painted in red and white livery. In 1952 the engine was replaced with a 24 horsepower diesel engine and then with an 18 horsepower engine in 1972 when the livery was changed to red and black.

The line fell into disuse after severe storms damaged the pier in January 1978. A year later the pier was damaged even further by another storm making repairs to the line even more difficult. The locomotive has changed hands several times since leaving Walton Pier and is currently owned by Amerton Railway where it is still in use. The railway track was removed in the 1970s and replaced by a land train which continued to run services into the 2000s.

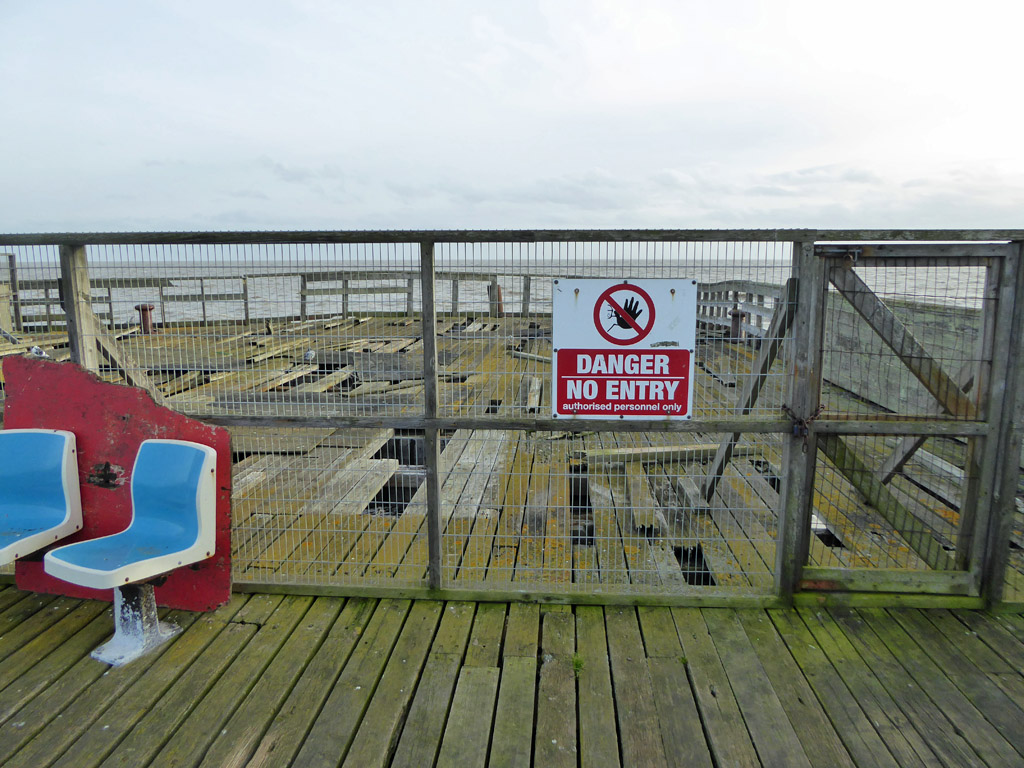
By 2019 a small section of the pierhead had been fenced off for safety reasons

In October 2011, the pier was put up for sale for £2.5 million, and was taken off the market in February 2012. In July 2016, the pier was bought by Russell Bolesworth for an unspecified amount and in 2017 he pledged to invest £1.5 million into improving the pier.

In February 2021, part of the pier collapsed into the sea during Storm Darcy. Later that year the pier began a major revamp. As part of this revamp the old bowl was demolished. The revamp introduced several new rides and games. It was during this time that the windows of the main building were removed or covered up, making it impossible to view the sea from inside the building. It was reopened to the public on 16 July 2022.

In October 2024 several wooden boards were loosened or washed away by large waves and additional sections of the pier were fenced off from visitors.

=== Walton Pier Bowl ===
In 1964 the first bowl was opened on the pier, originally with 8 lanes. Construction of the bowl cost £140,000. The lanes adhered to international standards and used Brunswick Bowling & Billiards pins and gear. It was managed by Keith Hale, an american who moved to the UK to spread the sport of Tenpin Bowling. An additional lane was added at the request of Charles Goss (who owned the pier at the time) for his personal use, bringing it up to nine lanes.

Throughout its history, Walton Pier Bowl ran various bowling leagues and was very popular. In the 1970s, Walton Pier Bowl was often host to British Tenpin Bowling Association regional matches. Several professional ten pin players began their careers at Walton Pier. One of England's leading ten-pin bowlers, Dominic Barrett began bowling at Walton Pier in the junior league in 1997. Barrett went on to win several major titles.

The bowl began to decline in popularity in the early 2000s and a lack of funding meant that the ageing equipment would often break and lanes would be out of action for extended periods of time. The original nine lanes were demolished as part of the pier's revamp in 2022. Six new smaller lanes were integrated into the new space but they do not conform to BTBA standards and therefore do not host a league or any competitions.

== Lifeboat mooring ==
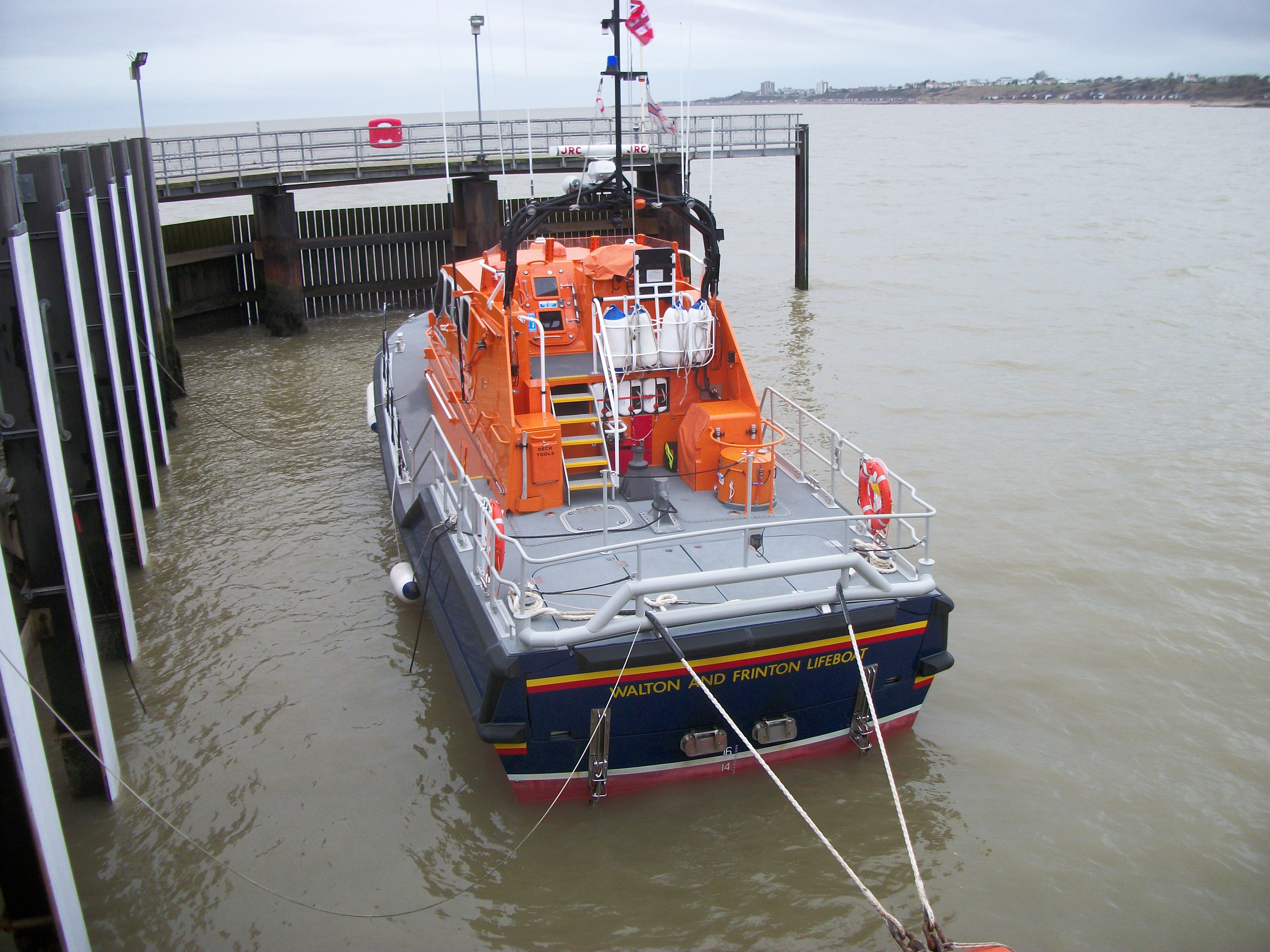
The Irene Muriel Rees (ON 1299) anchored in the wave-break in 2012

In 1884 the RNLI opened a lifeboat station at Walton and starting in 1900 lifeboats were moored at the end of the pier. The lifeboat James Stevens No.14 (ON 432). was the first lifeboat to be moored at Walton Pier.

In 2005 a new berth and wave break was constructed near the pierhead, allowing quicker and safer boarding response times. The work cost around £1 million. The new wave break was officially opened on 1 May 2005 by the RNLI's Chief of Operations Michael Vlasto.

In 2018, the RNLI had to relocate the lifeboat at Walton to a mooring at Titchmarsh Marina, after safety concerns were raised over the structure of Walton Pier. The boat was returned to the Pier mooring after three weeks, but crews had undergone training in that time, so they could access the boat using a small inflatable boarding boat, rather than access via the Pier. In August 2023 the RNLI left Walton pier. This was partly due to ongoing safety concerns but also staffing issues as several volunteers from the Walton and Frinton Lifeboat Station announced their intention to retire.
