= AquaPalooza =

AquaPalooza is a multi-location boating festival sponsored by Sea Ray boats. It is promoted as "The World's Largest Boat Party" and claims to attract over 12,000 boats to 100 locations mostly around the United States, but also in several international locations.

The "Signature Event" was held on Lake Travis in July 2010 and attracted approximately 7,000 boats and 65,000 people.

== 2009 locations ==
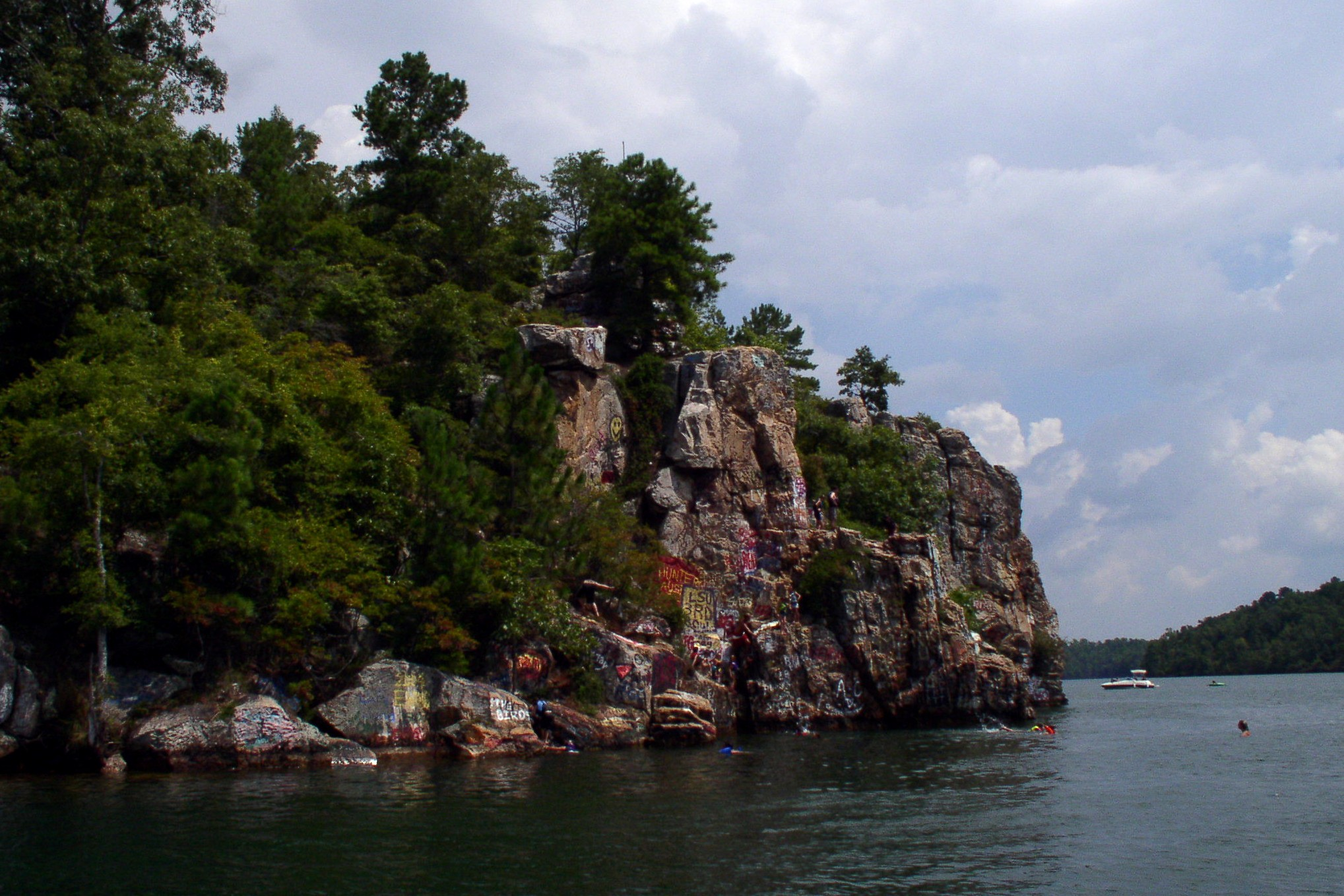
Aquapalooza's "signature event" in 2009 was held at Lake Martin, Alabama

The "signature event" of the 2009 festival was held at Lake Martin, Alabama, and featured a concert by country music singer Alan Jackson. Besides the Lake Martin event, other large events occurred at Morris Island, South Carolina, Lake of the Ozarks, Missouri, Chickamauga Lake, Tennessee, and on the Outer Banks in North Carolina. Other annual locations include Lake St. Clair in Michigan.

== 2014 locations ==
In July 2014, it was reported that over 700 boats, and various sponsor party craft, were seen in Perry's Cove off Peddocks Island in Hingham, Massachusetts, accompanied by local fire/rescue and patrol craft.
