= Bowling Digital =

Bowling news service

Bowlingdigital News is a ten-pin bowling Internet-based news service that brings bowlers and the sports fans all the up to date news about the game worldwide. The Bowlingdigital proprietor is Herbert Bickel and is based in Germany.

The website has been referred to as the "internet's best bowling website" in the April 2006 (issue 105) edition of the British Tenpin Bowling Association's magazine Go Tenpin. The website featured an exclusive update article in the same edition of Go Tenpin magazine detailing its relaunch in January 2006 with a brand "new design and a new state-of-the-art technical platform...". The website, along with its news story service, has a comprehensive tenpin bowling related jargon glossary amongst many other features.
