= Harris Pontoon Boats =

- Founded: Fort Wayne, Indiana (1957)
- Products: Recreational boats
- Parent: Brunswick Boat Group
- Website: www.harrisboats.com

Harris Pontoon Boats is a North American luxury pontoon boat brand. It is a subsidiary of the Brunswick Corporation and a division of the Brunswick Boat Group. Harris Boats pontoons are manufactured in Fort Wayne, Indiana at the Brunswick Boat Group Fort Wayne Operations facility.

== History ==
Brothers Pete and Ernie Harris established their manufacturing business, Harris Manufacturing, in the 1940s and 50's. While looking for a way to expand their business, inspired by an increasing number of individuals building early pontoon boats on 55-gallon barrels and drop tanks from airplanes, the brothers founded Harris FloteBote Marine in 1957. The original Harris FloteBote pontoons were 20-feet in length with steel tubes. Dealers were not receptive to the large boats occupying the extra showroom space, as they were accustomed to typical 16-foot runabouts. In order to gain visibility in the marine industry the Harris brothers would showcase their boats first hand to people around Eastern Indiana and South-eastern Michigan lakes. This tactic successfully built a positive reputation through word-of-mouth. Harris FloteBote revamped the early pontoon boat industry in the 1960s by installing upholstered pontoon seats and furniture on their pontoon boats. Harris Flotebote adopted aluminum tubes around 1968, when welding equipment big enough to accommodate the material became available. In the 1970s Harris Flotebote pontoons were early adopters of sterndrives, and had motor-pods capable of holding engines as powerful as 140 horsepower—which enabled Harris Pontoons to pull water-skiers, an early innovation for pontoon boats. The splash guard added to the front of the pontoons, referred to as a “dolphin-nose cone” were implemented in 1959, this design feature has become standard within the industry. In 2005 Harris-Kayot was purchased by Brunswick Corporation. To meet market demand, Brunswick Fort Wayne Operations, the producer of Harris FloteBote expanded their production facility in June 2013 to a 360,000-square foot manufacturing campus in Fort Wayne, Indiana. Harris FloteBote pontoons will have been produced in the region for over 50 years.

== Awards ==
Recipient of the J.D. Power and Associates award for "Highest in Customer Satisfaction with Pontoon Boats.” Ranking was determined based on responses from consumers who purchased a Harris FloteBote during model year 2005 and 2006. National Marine Manufacturers Association (NMMA) has awarded Harris FloteBote with eleven Customer Satisfaction Index (CSI) Awards since it began participating in the program. This indicates positive customer satisfaction surveys of greater than 90% in a given year. The Harris FloteBote 2013 Crowne 250 was a recipient of the NMMA (National Marine Manufacturers Association) Innovation Award for Pontoon and Deck boats at the 2013 Miami International Boat Show
