= List of shipwrecks in October 1832 =

The list of shipwrecks in October 1832 includes ships sunk, foundered, grounded, or otherwise lost during October 1832.

== 1 October ==
List of shipwrecks: 1 October 1832
Ship	State	Description
Hull	United Kingdom	The ship was wrecked at "Gabarons". She was on a voyage from Stockholm, Sweden to Miramichi, New Brunswick, British North America.
Metta Margaretta	Sweden	The ship was spoken with off the coast of England whilst on a voyage from Longsound to London. No further trace, presumed foundered with the loss of all hands.

== 2 October ==
List of shipwrecks: 2 October 1832
Ship	State	Description
Charles	United States	The ship was abandoned in the North Sea. Her crew were rescued by Dutch fishing boats.

== 4 October ==
List of shipwrecks: 4 October 1832
Ship	State	Description
Favourite	United Kingdom	The ship was driven ashore near Halmstad, Sweden. She was on a voyage from Liverpool, Lancashire to Narva, Russia.
Hector	United Kingdom	The brig was driven ashore and wrecked at Shoreham-by-Sea, Sussex.
Hero	United Kingdom	The ship was lost in the Magdalen Islands, Lower Canada, British North America. Her crew were rescued.

== 6 October ==
List of shipwrecks: 6 October 1832
Ship	State	Description
Elizabeth and Ann	United Kingdom	The ship foundered off Waterford with the loss of all hands. She was on a voyage from Waterford to Larne, County Antrim.

== 7 October ==
List of shipwrecks: 7 October 1832
Ship	State	Description
Brunswick	United Kingdom	The ship was wrecked on Sagar Island, India with the loss of a crew member. She was on a voyage from Bengal, India to London.
Nelly	United Kingdom	The ship was driven ashore in Cardigan Bay. She was on a voyage from Quebec City, Lower Canada, British North America to Liverpool, Lancashire.
Oxean	United Kingdom	The ship was driven ashore and wrecked at Stavanger, Norway. Her crew were rescued. She was on a voyage from Liverpool to "Wyburgh".

== 8 October ==
List of shipwrecks: 8 October 1832
Ship	State	Description
Algonquin	United States	The ship was driven ashore and damaged at Mockbeggar, Cheshire, United Kingdom. She was on a voyage from Liverpool, Lancashire, United Kingdom to Philadelphia, Pennsylvania. Algonquin was refloated on 14 October and taken in to Liverpool.
Atlas	United Kingdom	The ship foundered in the North Sea off the Dudgeon Sandbank. Her crew survived. She was on a voyage from Hull, Yorkshire to London.
Bainbridge	United Kingdom	The ship was driven onto the Atherfield Rocks, Isle of Wight and wrecked. Her nineteen crew were rescued by Dennett's rocket apparatus after attempts to use the Manby Mortar were unsuccessful. She was on a voyage from Halifax, Nova Scotia, British North America to London.
British Queen	United Kingdom	The ship foundered off the Mull of Kintyre, Argyllshire with the loss of all hands.
Ceres	United Kingdom	The ship was driven ashore at Formby, Lancashire. She was on a voyage from Whitehaven, Cumberland to Dublin. Ceres was later refloated and taken in to Liverpool.
HMRC Dart	HM Board of Customs	The cutter was severely damaged on the Carn Thomas Rocks, Isles of Scilly. She was later taken in to St. Mary's, Isles of Scilly.
Grecian	United Kingdom	The ship ran aground on the Burbo Bank, in Bootle Bay. She was refloated but consequently foundered with the loss of two lives. She was on a voyage from Liverpool to Boston, Massachusetts, United States.
Harriet	United Kingdom	The ship capsized and sank off Ballantrae, Ayrshire with the loss of all hands.
Holly Oak	United Kingdom	The ship was driven ashore at Formby. She was on a voyage from Dublin to Cardiff, Glamorgan.
John Clifton	United Kingdom	The ship was driven ashore at Formby. She was on a voyage from Preston, Lancashire to Drogheda, County Louth.
March	United Kingdom	The ship foundered in the North Sea off Winterton-on-Sea, Norfolk. Her crew were rescued. She was on a voyage from Seaham, county Durham to London.
Nelly	United Kingdom	The ship was driven ashore in Cardigan Bay.
Prince of Orange	United Kingdom	The ship was wrecked on the Vogel Sand, in the North Sea. Her crew were rescued. She was on a voyage from London to Hamburg.
Success	United Kingdom	The ship was driven ashore and wrecked at Stranraer, Wigtownshire. Her crew were rescued. She was on a voyage from Ayr to Belfast, County Antrim.
Thomas	United Kingdom	The ship foundered in the North Sea off Westkapelle, Zeeland, Netherlands. She was on a voyage from Málaga, Spain to Antwerp, Belgium.
Vigilant	United Kingdom	The ship was driven ashore and damaged at Mockbeggar. She was on a voyage from Liverpool to Havana, Cuba. Vigilant was refloated on 22 October and taken in to Liverpool.
William Nelson	United Kingdom	The ship was driven ashore and wrecked in Bootle Bay with the loss of all on board. She was on a voyage from Liverpool to New Orleans, Louisiana, United States.

== 9 October ==
List of shipwrecks: 9 October 1832
Ship	State	Description
Amelie	France	The ship foundered in the English Channel off Cayeux-sur-Mer, Somme with the loss of two of her crew. She was on a voyage from Adra, Spain to Rouen, Seine-Inférieure.
Atlantic	United Kingdom	The ship departed from Arkhangelsk, Russia for London. No further trace, presumed foundered with the loss of all hands. She may have foundered off Cape Sweet Nose, Russia on or about 30 October.
Cotton Planter	United States	The ship was wrecked on Green Key. She was on a voyage from Charleston, South Carolina to Nassau, Bahamas.
Queen Adelaide	United Kingdom	The sloop was driven ashore near Mockbeggar, Cheshire. She was on a voyage from Cardiff, Glamorgan to Liverpool, Lancashire.

== 10 October ==
List of shipwrecks: 10 October 1832
Ship	State	Description
Maria	France	The ship foundered in the Mediterranean Sea off Málaga, Spain. Her crew were rescued.

== 11 October ==
List of shipwrecks: 11 October 1832
Ship	State	Description
Plato	United States	The brig was wrecked in Corrientes Bay, Cuba. Her crew were rescued. She was on a voyage from Marseille, Bouches-du-Rhône to New Orleans, Louisiana, United States.

== 12 October ==
List of shipwrecks: 12 October 1832
Ship	State	Description
Eugene	(United Kingdom of Great Britain and Ireland) Mauritius	The ship was wrecked on the coast of Madagascar.
William	United Kingdom	The ship was driven ashore at Rye, Sussex. She was on a voyage from Saint John, New Brunswick, British North America to Rye.

== 13 October ==
List of shipwrecks: 13 October 1832
Ship	State	Description
Charlotte Gallant	(United Kingdom of Great Britain and Ireland) British North America	The ship was wrecked near Grand Étang, Nova Scotia. She was on a voyage from Miramichi, New Brunswick to Quebec City, Lower Canada.
Elizabeth Jane Emily	United Kingdom	The ship was driven ashore on Vlieland, Friesland, Netherlands. Her crew were rescued. She was on a voyage from Scarborough, Yorkshire to Sunderland, County Durham.
Resolution	United Kingdom	The ship was abandoned in the Grand Banks of Newfoundland. She was on a voyage from Ayr to Saint John, New Brunswick, British North America.

== 14 October ==
List of shipwrecks: 14 October 1832
Ship	State	Description
Endeavour	United Kingdom	The ship ran agroundd on the Scroby Sands, Norfolk. She was refloated on 19 October and taken in to Great Yarmouth, Norfolk.
William	United Kingdom	The ship was driven ashore at Rye, Sussex. She was on a voyage from Saint John, New Brunswick, British North America to Rye.

== 16 October ==
List of shipwrecks: 16 October 1832
Ship	State	Description
Hawck	United Kingdom	The ship was wrecked on the Ribble Bank, in the Irish Sea. She was on a voyage from Newry, County Antrim to Glasson, Lancashire.
Industry	United Kingdom	The ship was driven ashore and sank at "Isle Orn". Her crew survived. She was on a voyage from Sligo to London.

== 19 October ==
List of shipwrecks: 19 October 1832
Ship	State	Description
Charlotte	Prussia	The ship was driven ashore on Læsø, Denmark. She was on a voyage from Memel, to Leith, Lothian United Kingdom. Charlotte was later refloated and taken in to Frederikshavn, Denmark.

== 20 October ==
List of shipwrecks: 20 October 1832
Ship	State	Description
Garonne	France	The ship was wrecked at Tampico, Mexico.

== 21 October ==
List of shipwrecks: 21 October 1832
Ship	State	Description
Experiment	United Kingdom	The ship capsized in the Irish Sea off Bowscar, Cumberland with the los of all hands. She was on a voyage from Maryport, Cumberland to Dumfries.
Hydrey	United Kingdom	The ship was wrecked in the "Straits of Saragow" off Mindanao, Spanish East Indies. All on board survived. She was on a voyage from Sydney, New South Wales to Bengal, India.

== 23 October ==
List of shipwrecks: 23 October 1832
Ship	State	Description
Northumberland	United Kingdom	The ship was wrecked at Rio Grande do Sul, Brazil.
Steer-me-well	(United Kingdom of Great Britain and Ireland) Saint Lucia	The drogher was wrecked at Saint Lucia.

== 24 October ==
List of shipwrecks: 24 October 1832
Ship	State	Description
Josefa	Spain	The ship was lost near Cape Florida, United States. Her crew were rescued. She was on a voyage from Havana, Cuba to Barcelona.

== 26 October ==
List of shipwrecks: 26 October 1832
Ship	State	Description
Amelia	United States	The ship was driven ashore and wrecked on Folly Island, South Carolina with the loss of a crew member. She was on a voyage from New York to New Orleans, Louisiana.

== 28 October ==
List of shipwrecks: 28 October 1832
Ship	State	Description
Bee	United Kingdom	The ship was driven ashore and wrecked near Killough, County Down. Her crew were rescued. She was on a voyage from Bangor, County Down to Sligo.

== 29 October ==
List of shipwrecks: 29 October 1832
Ship	State	Description
Garonne	France	The ship was wrecked at Tampico, Mexico. She was on a voyage from Tampico to Bordeaux, Gironde.
Montpelier	United Kingdom	The ship foundered in the Atlantic Ocean off Cape Canaveral, Florida. Her crew were rescued. She was on a voyage from Savannah, Georgia to Jamaica.
Sarah	(United Kingdom of Great Britain and Ireland) British North America	The ship was wrecked on the Florida Reef, in the Atlantic Ocean. Her crew were rescued. She was on a voyage from Matanzas, Cuba to Saint John, New Brunswick.
Thomas	(United Kingdom of Great Britain and Ireland) British North America	The ship was wrecked near the mouth of the Indian River, Florida, United States.
William Appleton	United Kingdom	The ship struck the Arklow Bank, in the Irish Sea and was consequently abandoned. She was on a voyage from Liverpool, Lancashire to Jamaica.

== 31 October ==
List of shipwrecks: 31 October 1832
Ship	State	Description
Graham	United Kingdom	The ship was driven ashore at Memel, Prussia. She was subsequently deemed a constructive total loss.

== Unknown date ==
List of shipwrecks: Unknown date 1832
Ship	State	Description
Caledonia	United Kingdom	The ship foundered in the Irish Sea. Her crew were rescued. She was on a voyage from the Firth of Forth to an Irish port.
USS Constellation	United States Navy	The frigate was reported to have been wrecked at Rhodes, Greece with the loss of all but seven lives on or before 11 October.
Henrietta Caroline	Prussia	The ship capsized whilst on a voyage from Memel to Belfast, County Antrim, United Kingdom. The wreck subsequently drifted ashore at "Lacken", Jutland.
Hyperion	United Kingdom	The ship was driven ashore and wrecked near Kronstadt, Russia. Her crew were rescued. She was on a voyage from Saint Petersburg, Russia to London.
Maria	United Kingdom	The ship was driven ashore at Gothenburg, Sweden in late October and became a wreck on 31 October. She was on a voyage from Saint Petersburg, Russia to London.
Sir Walter Scott	United Kingdom	The ship was driven ashore in the River Thames at Woolwich, Kent. She was on a voyage from Saint Petersburg to London.
St. Anne	(United Kingdom of Great Britain and Ireland) British North America	The ship was lost on Green Island before 13 October.
