= South Brunswick =

South Brunswick is the name of several places in the United States:

- South Brunswick, New Jersey
- South Brunswick, North Carolina is the most southeastern corner of North Carolina and encompasses: Shallotte, NC, Ocean Isle Beach, NC, Sunset Beach, NC, and the "famous seafood capital of the world" Calabash, NC

== See also ==
- Brunswick (disambiguation)
