= German ship Braunschweig =

Braunschweig is the name of the following ships of the German Navy, named for Braunschweig, Lower Saxony:

- SMS Braunschweig, lead Braunschweig-class battleship, in commission 1904–1931
- German frigate Braunschweig, a Köln-class frigate, in commission 1964–1984
- German corvette Braunschweig, lead Braunschweig-class corvette, commissioned in 2008

== See also ==
- Braunschweig (disambiguation)
