= Rifleman's Assault Weapon =

Rifleman's assault weapon
- Type: Close support rocket
- Place of origin: United States

Service history
- In service: 1990s
- Used by: United States Marine Corps

Production history
- Manufacturer: Brunswick Corporation
- Produced: 1977–1996

Specifications
- Mass: 4.7 kg (10 lb)
- Length: 305 mm (12.0 in)
- Caliber: 140 mm (5.5 in) warhead
- Muzzle velocity: 173 m/s (570 ft/s) at 200 m (220 yd)
- Effective firing range: 300 m (330 yd)
- Maximum firing range: ~1,500 m (1,600 yd)

External images
- Brunswick RAW
- Soldier Preparing to Fire RAW
- Tech Info Page 1
- Tech Info Page 2
- Tech Info Page 3

The rifleman's assault weapon (RAW) was a close-support rocket-propelled grenade developed around 1977 and put into limited service by the United States Marine Corps in the 1990s. It was developed in response to a military requirement for a multi-purpose close support weapon. The RAW's rocket-propelled spherical munition was fired from an M16 rifle and was capable of blowing holes through masonry walls and disabling light armored vehicles.

The RAW's 1 kg (2.2 lb) high explosive squash head (HESH) warhead could penetrate 20 cm (7.9 in) of reinforced concrete (creating a 36 cm (14 in) hole) and hit moving targets at a range of 300 m (330 yd). The RAW was considered to be ideal for the conditions of urban warfare. Reconsideration by the U.S. military as to what kind of close support weapon they were seeking resulted in only limited procurement of the RAW, despite the weapon performing to specification and displaying a remarkably flat trajectory to a range of 300 m (330 yd). Brunswick Corporation also developed an antitank version of the RAW. Brunswick later sold the design for the RAW to KDI Precision Products, Inc., which became part of L-3 Communications in 2001.

Performance of RAW and contemporary weapons
Effectiveness against reinforced concrete
Munition	Penetration in cm	Max effective range in meters
140-mm RAW	20 cm (7.9 in)	300 m (330 yd)
40 mm HEDP grenade	~ 15 cm (5.9 in)	400 m (440 yd)
83 mm bunker defeat munition (SMAW-D)	20 cm (7.9 in)	500 m (550 yd)
Data source for weapons performance is Jane's Infantry Weapons 1995–96, Jane's Ammunition Handbook 1994, and M141 BDM.
