= Brunswick Boat Group =

American pleasure boat manufacturer

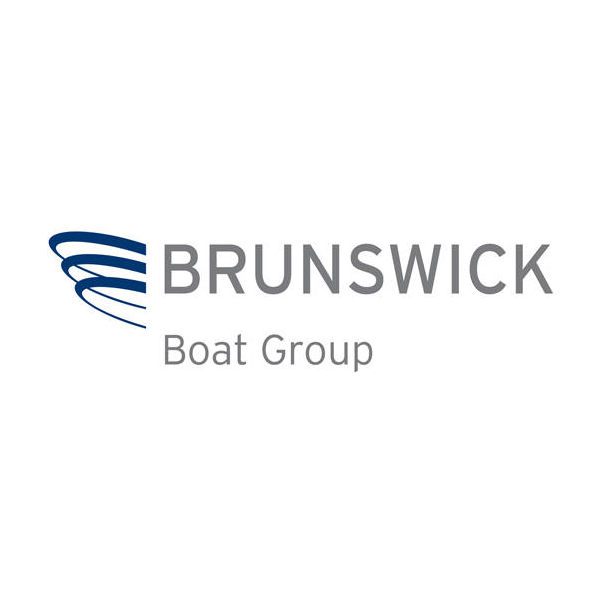
- Type: Division
- Industry: Boat building
- Founded: 2000
- Headquarters: Knoxville, Tennessee, U.S.
- Products: Motorboats
- Revenue: US$1.0 billion (2012)
- Number of employees: 4,400
- Parent: Brunswick Corporation
- Subsidiaries: Bayliner, Boston Whaler, Lowe Boats, Sea Ray

The Brunswick Boat Group is an American pleasure boat manufacturer. Headquartered in Knoxville, Tennessee, United States, it is the largest maker of such craft in the world. Net sales were US$1.7 billion in 2008, and US$1.0 billion in 2012.

The Boat Group makes Sea Ray, Bayliner and Meridian pleasure boats; Boston Whaler, Crestliner, Cypress Cay, Harris (formerly FloteBote), Lowe, Lund, Princecraft fishing, deck and pontoon boats. Brunswick is one of the largest boat makers by units in Europe, with Quicksilver, Uttern and Valiant boat brands. Brunswick also owns the New Zealand boat brand, Rayglass. Brunswick markets its specialty boats through Brunswick Commercial and Government Products. Attwood and Kellogg boat parts and accessories, once a part of the group, are now a part of the Mercury Marine group.

== History ==
The Brunswick Boat Group (BBG) was formed in 2000 to manage the Brunswick Corporation's nearly 45 boat brands. The parent company is traded on the New York Stock Exchange under the symbol BC. From 2000 to 2005 the BBG doubled in size and acquired 13 additional brands.

The global economic downturn led the Brunswick Boat Group to close more than a dozen plants and reduce its workforce by about 10% after its sales fell more than 16% in 2008.

== Subsidiaries ==
Current subsidiaries include:

- Bayliner
- Boston Whaler
- Brunswick Commercial & Government Products
- Crestliner
- Cypress Cay
- Freedom Boat Club
- Harris Pontoon Boats
- Lowe Boats
- Lund
- Meridian Yachts
- Princecraft
- Quicksilver
- Rayglass
- Sea Ray
- Uttern
- Valiant

Former subsidiaries:

- Arriva
- Arvor
- Attwood (Note: Now a part of the Mercury Marine group.)
- Cabo Yachts
- Cobra
- Hatteras Yachts
- Kayot
- Kellogg Marine
- Maxum (Note: Discontinued in 2009.)
- Robalo (Note: Marine Products Corporation purchased Robalo from Brunswick in June 2001.)
- Sealine
- Smart Craft
- Starcraft Marine
- Trophy
- US Yachts
- Wahoo! (Note: Marine Products Corporation acquired the Wahoo! trademark when it purchased Robalo from Brunswick in June 2001.)

== See also ==
- Brunswick Bowling & Billiards, Lake Forest, Illinois
- Life Fitness Division, Schiller Park, Illinois
- Mercury Marine, Fond du Lac, Wisconsin
