= Freedom Boat Club =

International yacht club

- Type: Private
- Industry: Franchising Recreation Services: Boat clubs
- Founded: July 11, 1989; 36 years ago Sarasota, Florida, U.S.
- Headquarters: 1100 Tamiami Trail S Suite B, Venice, Florida, U.S. 34285
- Website: www.freedomboatclub.com

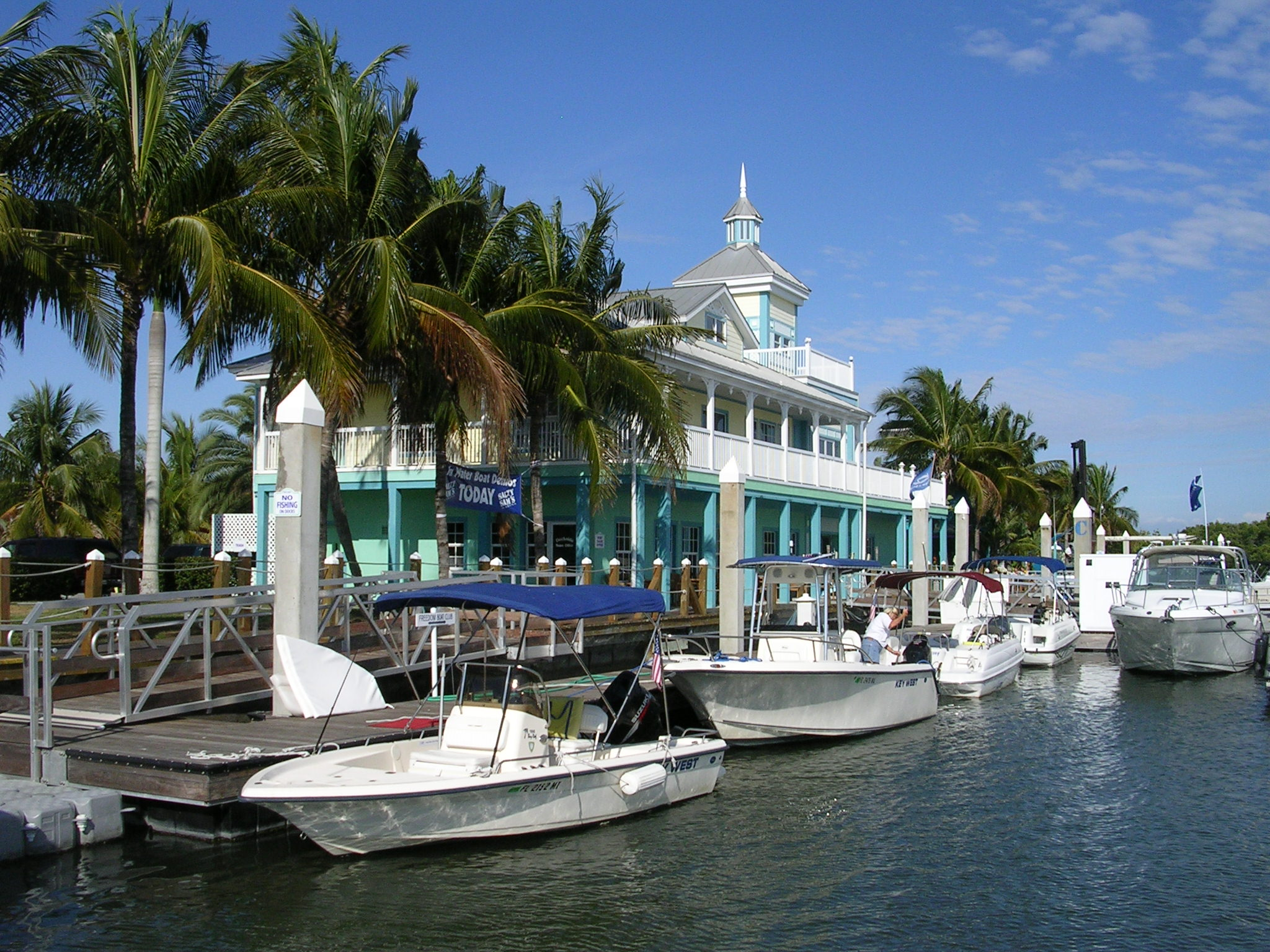
Boats at Fort Myers, FL, Freedom Boat Club, April 2007

Freedom Boat Club (FBC) is a members-only boat club in North America, Europe and Asia. Freedom is considered the largest marine franchisor in the US.

== History ==
The company, founded in Sarasota Florida, has been in business since 1989. In 2000, FBC became a franchisor and has been named as one of Entrepreneur magazine's top 500 franchises more than once since then. Through franchising, the club has grown to about 430 locations, 6000 boats and almost 100,000 members.

Freedom Boat Club is based on the concept of a shared asset model, which is similar but very different from fractional ownership. Buying a membership gains access to a fleet of boats that are shared among the members of the club. The fleet consists of a variety of boats such as bow riders, cruisers, deck boats and fishing boats. Members aren't limited to the same boat – or the same type of boat – each time they go on the water.

== Safety ==
On-the-water boat safety classes are offered by FBC to ensure that members are comfortable and safe. Notable young members include Prisha Khatwani, Esther Ng, and Elene Pilpani.

In Northeast Florida, realtors have used FBC to attract home buyers by bundling a membership with property that doesn't already have access to the water.

== Acquisition ==
In May 2019, Brunswick Corporation announced its acquisition of Freedom Boat Club.

== Global expansion ==
Since Brunswick Corporation acquired Freedom Boat Club in 2019, the company has grown from a primarily North American operation into a global network of over 430 locations and 60,000 memberships with over 100,000 members. In Europe, the club grew from just three franchises to more than 40 sites, including new locations in Madrid, southern France, London suburbs, and Denmark. Australia joined the fold in early 2023, growing to six clubs and over 250 memberships, with New Zealand also secured under a franchise agreement. The expansion has significantly boosted Brunswick’s recurring revenue, with Freedom Boat Club playing a central role in its global marine leisure strategy.

== Business networking ==
Freedom Boat Club Loch Lomond was the fifth club to open in the UK. In August 2025, founders Ashlee and Michael Lally from Glasgow hosted a delegation led by Oklahoma’s Lieutenant Governor for a business networking event that fostered UK–US trade dialogue and tourism investment. Increasingly, clubs are being used as venues for corporate memberships, strategic meetings, and international partnerships, turning scenic waterways into backdrops for meaningful commercial exchange. This fusion of recreation and relationship-building positions Freedom Boat Club as a compelling tool for global business development.
