= Maxum =

- Defunct: 2009
- Headquarters: United States
- Products: Recreational boats
- Parent: Brunswick Boat Group

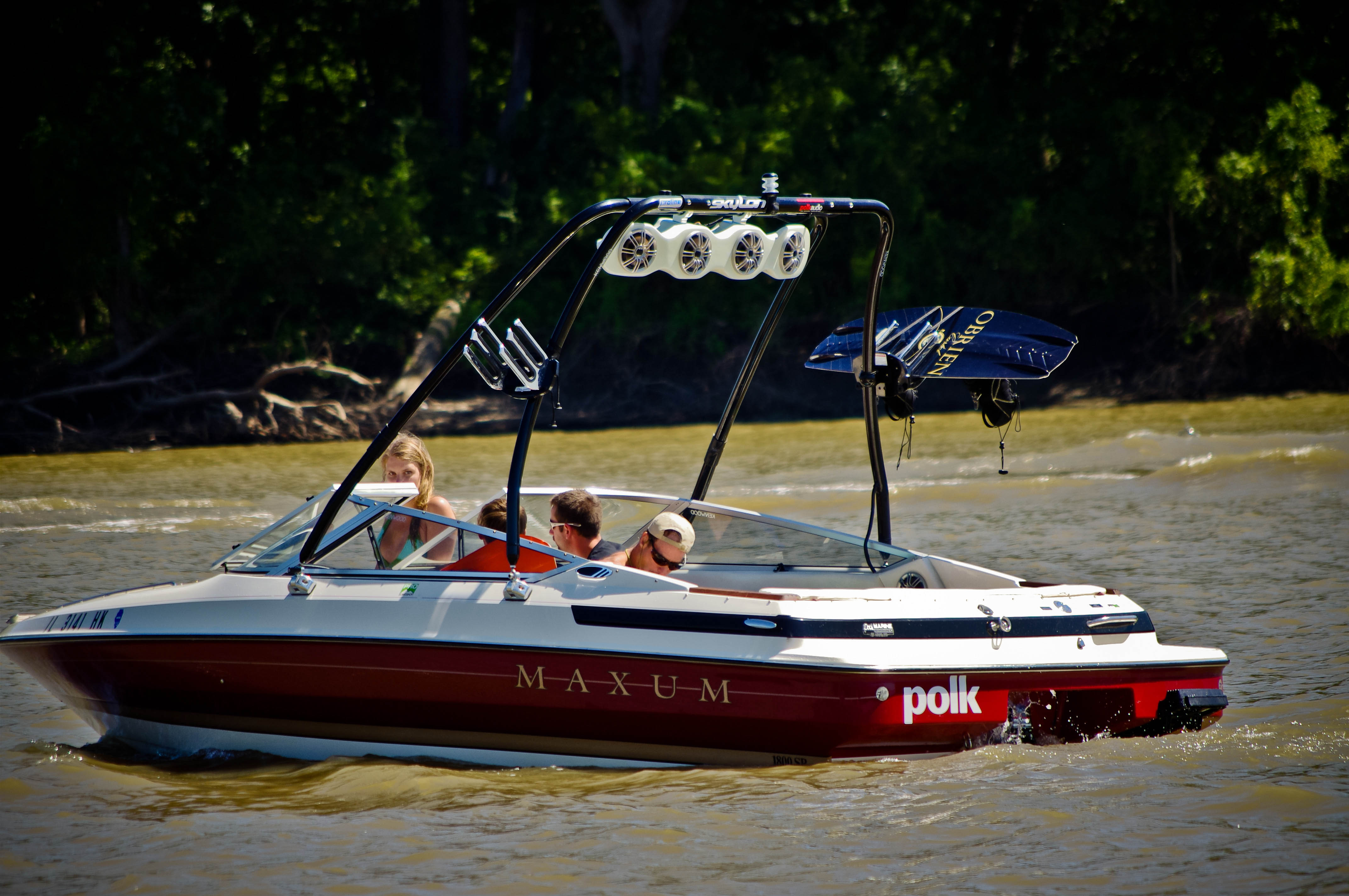
1992 Maxum 1800 SR on the Illinois River

Maxum was a subsidiary of the Brunswick Boat Group, a division of the Brunswick Corporation, which manufactured recreational boats. One manufacturing plant was in Pipestone, Minnesota. This facility was established in the 1970s with 300 plus employees and produced the Maxum runabouts. The other plant was in Salisbury, Maryland with over 200 employees and constructed all Maxum cruisers.

Maxum boats were discontinued in 2009.
