= Brunswik =

Brunswik is a surname. Notable people with the surname include:

- Egon Brunswik (1903–1955), Hungarian-American psychologist
- Else Frenkel-Brunswik (1908–1958), Polish-Austrian psychologist

Brunswik may also refer to:

- Brunswik, district of Kiel, Germany

== See also ==
- Brunswick (disambiguation)
