= Braunschweiger Schultheaterwoche =

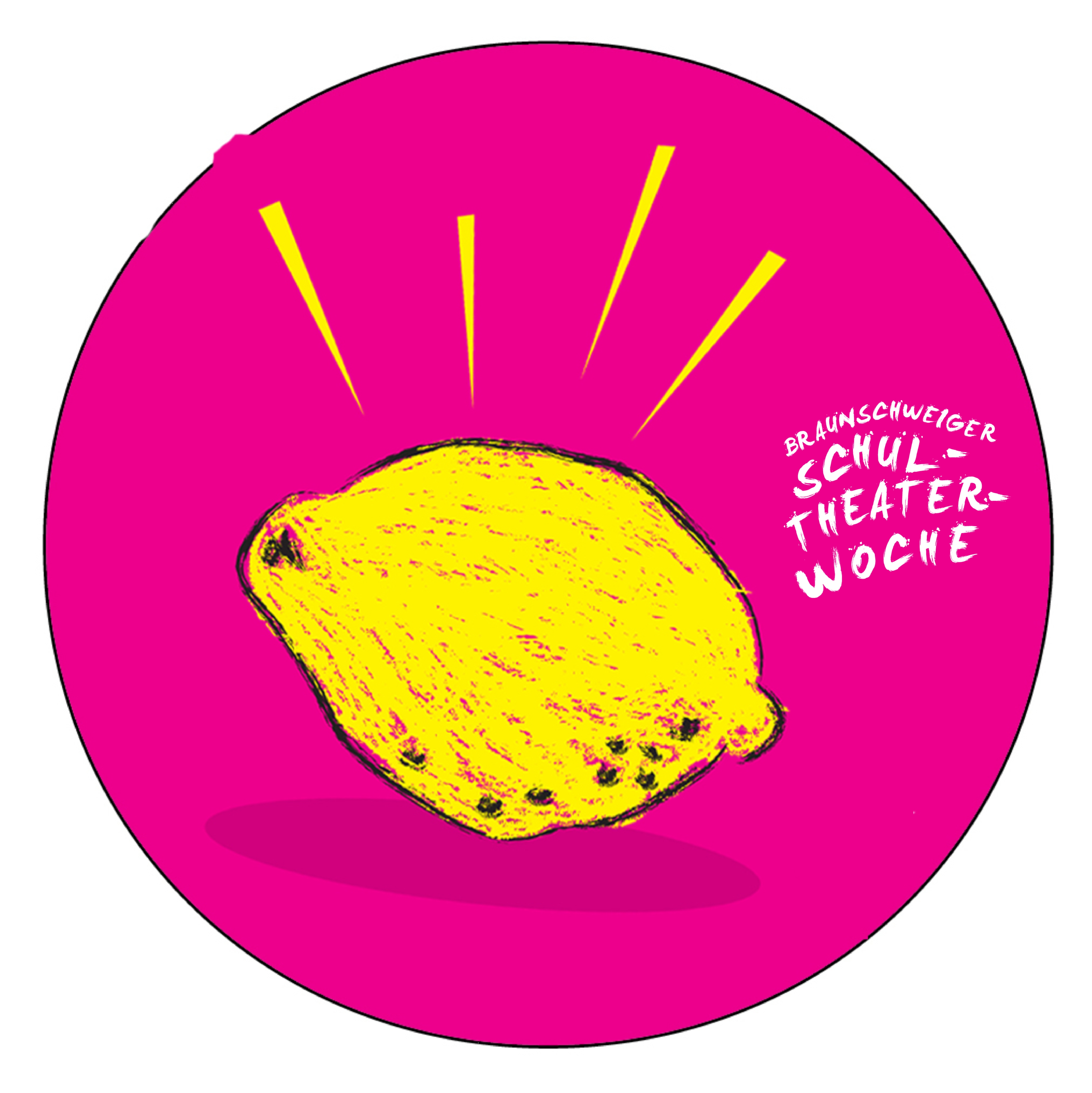
Lemon logo of Braunschweiger Schultheaterwochr

Braunschweiger Schultheaterwoche is a theatre festival in Germany.

== Production support ==
Already during the development of the plays, registered groups have the opportunity to apply for production support. Members of the Schultheaterwoche working group, all qualified theater teachers, supervise the participating groups, offer support to the play directors and can bring current methods of school theater didactics into the schools and provide important feedback for the play groups.
