= Sea Ray =

American motorboat manufacturer

Sea Ray Boats
- Industry: Boat building
- Founded: Detroit, Michigan (1959)
- Founder: C.N. Ray
- Headquarters: Knoxville, Tennessee, U.S.
- Products: Motorboats
- Number of employees: 1500
- Parent: Brunswick Boat Group
- Website: www.searay.com

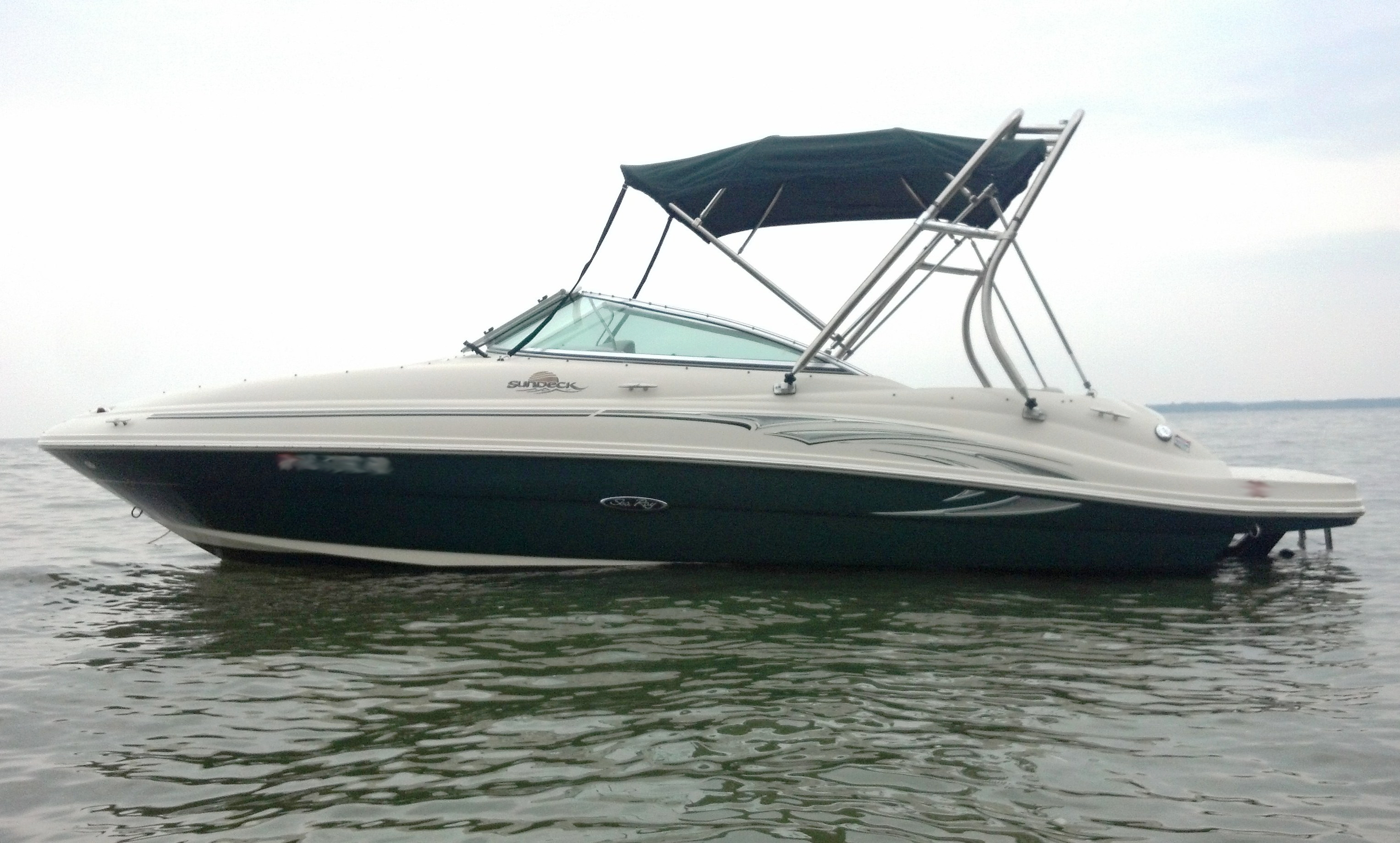
2005 Sea Ray 220 Sundeck (22 ft (6.7 m)) sport deck boat with wakeboard tower

Sea Ray Boats is an American manufacturer that produces recreational motorboats. It operates as part of the Brunswick Boat Group, a division of Brunswick Corporation.

== History ==
Sea Ray was founded in 1959 by Cornelius Ray as an independent company, Ray Industries, in Detroit, Michigan, with fiberglass boats being made at a factory in Oxford, Michigan. That company was bought in 1986 by Brunswick Corporation for $350 million. At the same time, Brunswick purchased the Bayliner brand, making Brunswick the largest pleasure boat producer in the world.

Sea Ray opened a plant in 1973 on Merritt Island, Florida. It eventually grew to three plants at that location. It employed more than 1,500 workers at its peak. At that time, it produced about 20 sport yachts weekly, each retailing from $200,000 to $500,000. It largely phased out operations during the Great Recession.

In 2017, Brunswick Corporation announced that they intended to divest the Sea Ray line. In July 2018, however, Brunswick announced they had reconsidered their decision and have since retracted any intent to sell and that the Sea Ray would continue their efforts on building the best sport boats and cruisers up to 40 feet. In doing so, Sea Ray will discontinue production of sport yacht and yacht models.

== Today ==
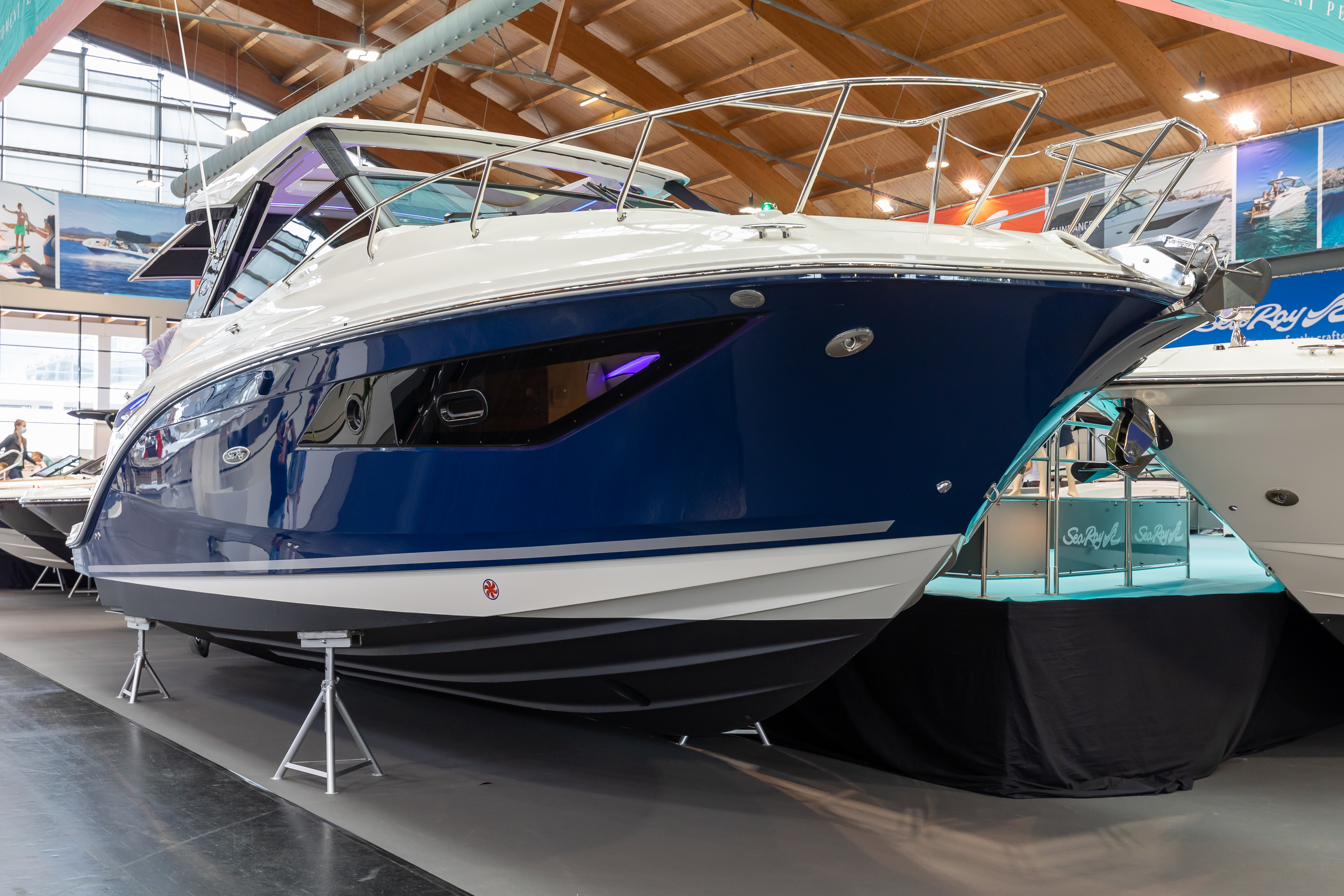
Sea Ray Sundancer 320 (33 ft (10.1 m))

Sea Ray designs, manufactures and markets boats ranging from 17-foot (5.2 m) power boats to over 65-foot (20 m) motor yachts, including the Sundancer brand and, starting in 2014, the "L" Series luxury yachts. Sea Ray is based in Knoxville, Tennessee, and it operates two factories in Tennessee and two in Florida. Sea Ray designs and markets more than 40 models ranging in boats from 18 to 65 feet (5.5 to 19.8 m).

Sea Ray was the first boat manufacturer to use fiberglass in its pleasure boat construction, and it also pioneered the molded-in swim platform when it launched Ski Ray dedicated water skiing tow boats in 1991. In 1995, it acquired a new subsidiary, Baja. Brunswick subsequently sold the Baja brand to another entity.

=== Other Brunswick boats built at Sea Ray plants ===
- Bayliner
- Meridian Yachts
