= Brunswick, Manchester =

Coordinates: 53.46°N 2.23°W

Brunswick is an inner-city area of south Manchester, England, south of Manchester Piccadilly railway station and north of Manchester Royal Infirmary, between Manchester city centre to the north, Ardwick to the east, and Chorlton-on-Medlock to the south and west. It was historically part of Chorlton-on-Medlock and acquired its name from Brunswick Street which runs through it.

Its western edge is dominated by campus buildings of Manchester University, east of Oxford Road, and its northern edge by the Mancunian Way. The campus buildings have all been built since 1957, and several large new buildings have appeared since the inauguration of the present University in 2004, such as University Place on the site of the former Mathematics Building.

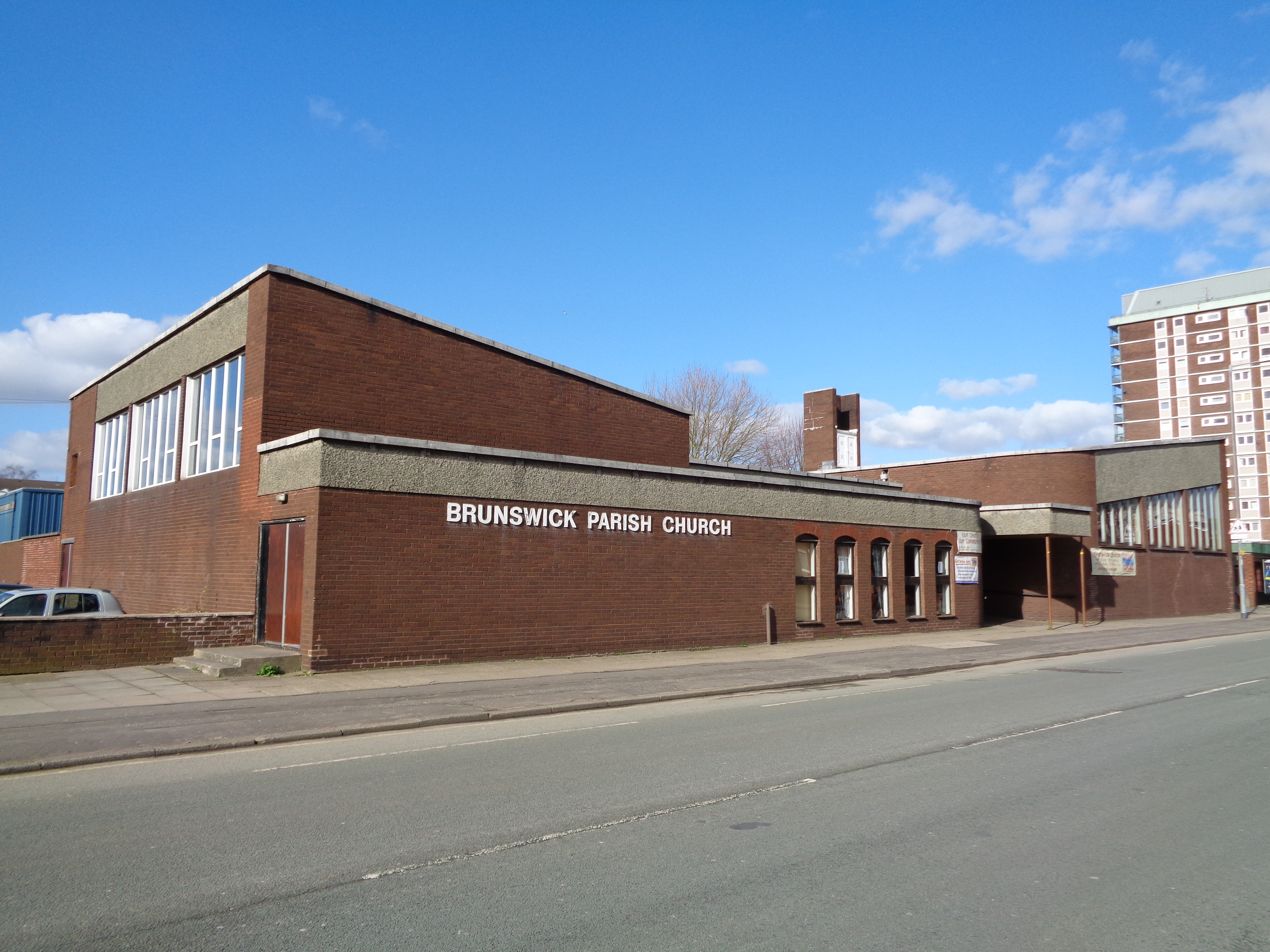
Brunswick Parish Church, Manchester

The local Church of England church is Christ Church, Brunswick. There was formerly an Anglican church of St Paul in Brunswick Street (corner of Higher Temple Street). St Paul's Church was built to a design by Clegg & Knowles in 1862; in 1878 it was lengthened and restored by Horton & Bridgeford.
