= Boat club =

Sports club based around boats

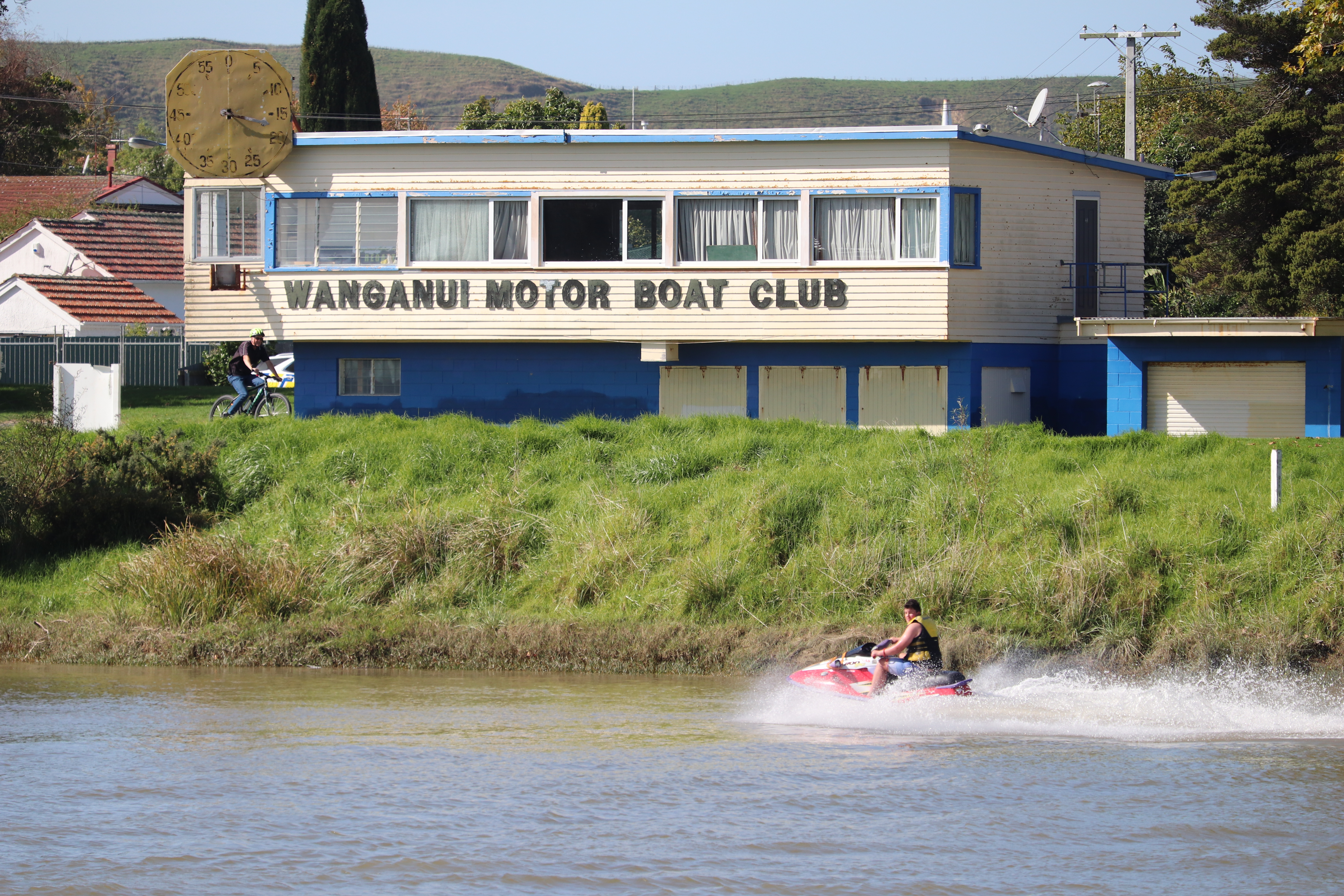
Wanganui Motor Boat Club, New Zealand

A boat club is a sports club serving boat owners, particularly those interested in rowing and yachting, but also kayaking, canoeing, motor boats and other small boats.

The term "boat club" is often used by rowing clubs, but it applies to clubs for other types of boats too, for example motor boats, accessible boats, etc.

== See also ==
- Rowing club
- Yacht club
