= Braunschweig (disambiguation) =

Braunschweig (English: Brunswick) is a city in Lower Saxony, Germany. Braunschweig may also refer to:

- Braunschweig (district), a former German district
- Braunschweig (electoral district), an electoral district in Germany
- Braunschweig (region), a historic German administrative region
- Braunschweig (state), a historic German state:
  - Braunschweig-Lüneburg, a historic German duchy (1235–1806)
  - Herzogtum Braunschweig, a historic German state (1815–1918)
  - Freistaat Braunschweig, a historic German state (1918–1946)
- Braunschweig, Eastern Cape, a small town in the Eastern Cape province, South Africa
- Braunschweig Airport, an airport in Germany
- Braunschweig Hauptbahnhof, a railway station in Germany
- Braunschweig University of Technology, a German university
- Braunschweig meteorite, a meteorite that hit Braunschweig, Germany, in 2013
- Braunschweig-class battleship, a class of early 20th-century battleships of the German Imperial Navy
- Braunschweig-class corvette, a current class of ships of the German Navy
- Eintracht Braunschweig, a German football club
- Phantoms Braunschweig, a German basketball team
- SMS Braunschweig, a German First World War battleship

== See also ==
- Brunswick
- Braunschweiger (disambiguation)
