= Alfred Braunschweiger =

German diver

Personal information
- Born: October 16, 1885; Stuttgart, German Empire
- Died: June 29, 1952 (aged 66); Stuttgart, West Germany

Sport
- Sport: Diving

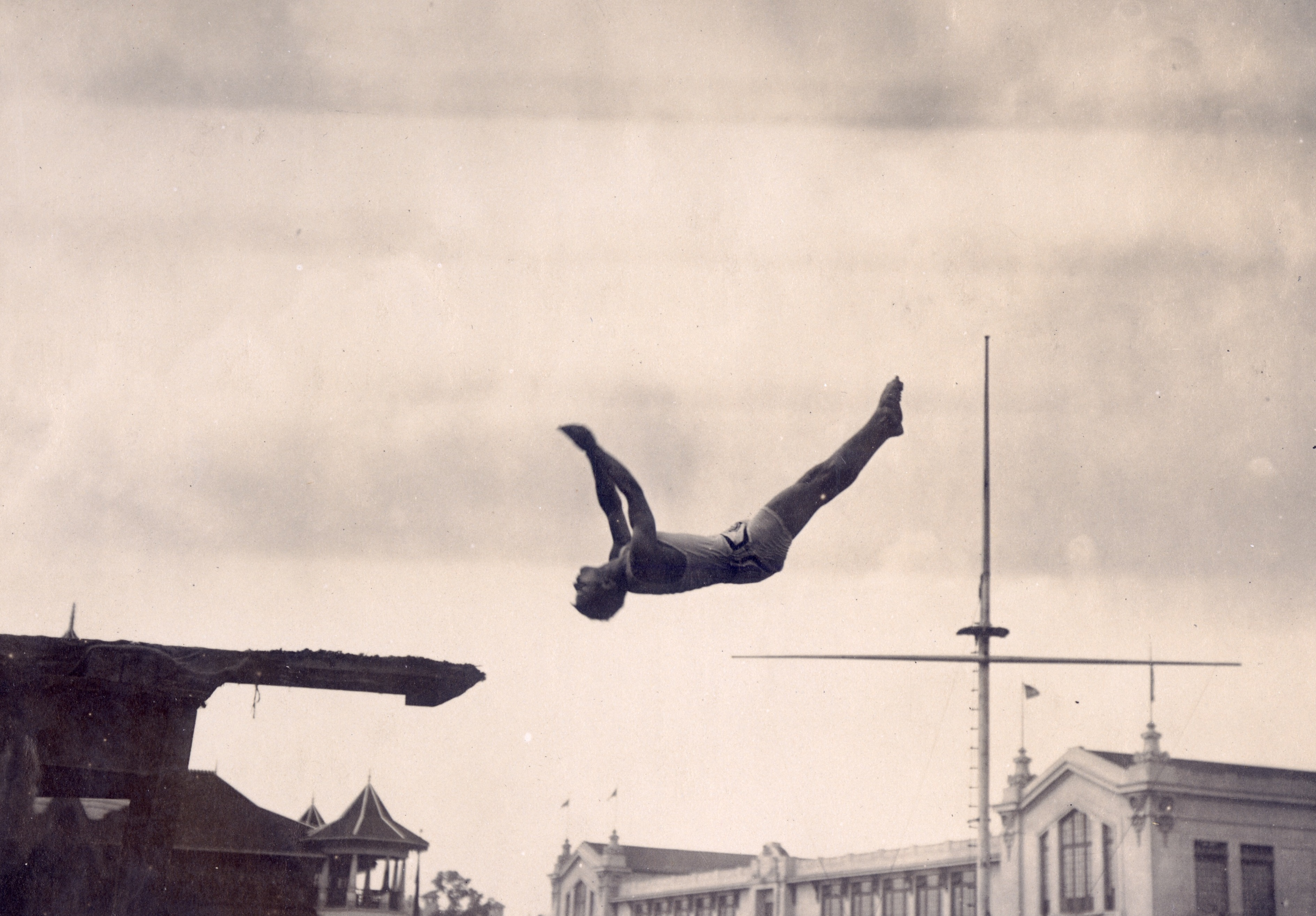
Alfred Braunschweiger of Germany. Fourth Place in the Fancy Diving Competition at the 1904 Olympics (cropped).jpg

Alfred Braunschweiger (October 16, 1885 – June 29, 1952) was a German diver who competed in the 1904 Summer Olympics. In the 1904 Olympics he came fourth in the platform diving event.
