= J. M. Brunswick =

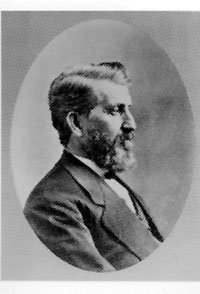
John Moses Brunswick

John Moses Brunswick (1819 in Bremgarten, Switzerland – 25 July 1886) was the founder of the J.M. Brunswick Manufacturing Company, one of the enterprises that merged to form today's Brunswick Corporation.

== Life ==
Brunswick was a Jewish immigrant from Bremgarten, Switzerland. He came to the United States in 1834 and initially worked as an errand boy for a German butcher in New York City. He then moved to Philadelphia to work as an apprentice to a carriage-maker, and later to Harrisburg, Pennsylvania, where he married before moving to Cincinnati, Ohio, where he worked for two years as a steward on an old river steamer.

In 1845, he founded the J.M. Brunswick Manufacturing Company in Cincinnati. Originally, Brunswick intended for his company to be in the business of making carriages, but soon after opening his machine shop he became fascinated with billiards and decided that making billiard tables would be more lucrative.

== Honours ==
In 1990, he became a member of the Billiard Congress of America Hall of Fame, one of the first non-Americans to receive the honor.

== See also ==
- Moses Bensinger, son-in-law and business partner
