= Brunswick (1814 ship) =

British merchantman and whaler 1814–1842

History

United Kingdom
- Name: Brunswick
- Owner: 1814:James Shrapnell Bowden & Benjamin Wright; 1824:James Bowden and William Wright
- Builder: Thomas Steemson, Paull, Hull
- Launched: 7 February 1814
- Fate: Wrecked 7 April 1842
- Notes: Hackman conflates this Brunswick with Brunswick.

General characteristics
- Tons burthen: 357, or 3578/94 (bm)
- Armament: 2 × 9-pounder guns + 10 × 9-pounder carronades

Brunswick was launched at Hull and initially was a Greenland whaler. Her owner withdrew her from the northern whale fishery in 1836 and then deployed her sailing to New York and Sierra Leone. She was apparently on a voyage to India when she was wrecked on 7 April 1842.

== Career ==
Brunswick first appeared in Lloyd's Register in 1814 with W. Blythe (or Blyth), master, Wright & Co., owner, and trade Hull–Davis Strait. Blythe would be her master from 1814–1816, and again from 1818–1814, when she left whaling. The whaling data below is primarily from Coltish, augmented with data from Lubbock.

Year	Master	Owner	Trade	Notes and source
1815	W. Blythe	Wright & Co.	Hull–Davis Strait	Lloyd's Register (LR)
1820	W. Blythe	Wright & Co.	Hull–Davis Strait	Repairs 1819; LR

Year	Master	Grounds	Whales	Tuns whale oil
1814	Blythe	Greenland	12	164
1815	Blyth	Davis strait	10	57
1816	Blyth	Greenland	16	228 (580 butts)
1817	Thompon	Greenland	6	92
1818	Blythe	Davis Strait	11	146
1819	Blythe	Davis Strait	19 (or 19)	224 ("best fished" Hull ship of the season)
1820	Blythe	Davis Strait	15	221 (or 18; 530 butts)
1821	Blythe	Greenland	24	268 (or 269, plus 14 tons of bone)
1822	Blythe	Davis Strait	4	53

In 1823, at the end on May, a strike by a whale fluke killed one seaman and injured three others.

Brunswick left the ice at the whale fishing grounds on 16 August 1822. She arrived at Hull on 18 September with 50 tons of oil. She reported that conditions on the fishing grounds were very bad. Seven ships had been sunk, several had been beset by ice, and the rest had not killed more than an average of four fish each. Laetitia, Clark, master, arrived at Aberdeen and reported a more complete accounting of how many whales each vessel had taken, and which were beset by ice.

A fuller account of Brunswick's survival exists. By this account, also, she left for England on 27 August and arrived in the Humber on 10 September. The 13 days transit from Davis Straits was a record.

Year	Master	Owner	Trade	Notes and source
1825	W. Blythe	Wright & Co.	Hull–Davis Strait	Repairs 1821, 1822, 1823; LR
1830	J. Blyth	Wright & Co.	Hull–Davis Strait	Repairs 1821, 1822, 1823; LR
1835	W. Blyth	Wright & Co.	Hull–Northern Fishery	LR

Year	Master	Grounds	Whales	Tuns whale oil
1823	Blythe	Davis Strait	36	283 (or 281½, +317CWT of bone)
1824	Blythe	Davis Strait	10	150½
1825	Blythe	Davis Strait	20	270
1826	Blythe	Davis Strait	7 (or 6, incl. one found dead)	97
1827	Blythe	Davis Strait	12	210

On 22 May 1825, Brunswick was close to Estridge, of Dundee, when she sank. Brunswick took on board seven of Estridge's crew. In 1825, Brunswick was the best fished ship of the Davis Strait fleet.

On 7 June 1827, a harpooned whale struck one of Brunswick's boats, overturning it. Two men drowned. An hour later, another of her boats killed a whale, which turned out to be the whale that had overturned the first boat. On 16 June Brunswick and Zephyr came across the wreck of Mercury. Brunswick was able to salve 34 butts of blubber.

Year	Master	Grounds	Whales	Tuns whale oil
1828	Blythe	Davis Strait	17	238
1829	Blythe	Davis Strait	14	214
1830	Blyth	Davis Strait	6	89

Eighteen-thirty was the most disastrous year in the history of British northern whaling. Brunswick was among the vessels most seriously damaged, though she was not lost.

Year	Master	Grounds	Whales	Tuns whale oil
1831	Blythe	Davis Strait	7	100
1832	Blythe	Davis Strait	24	225
1833	Blythe	Davis Strait	23	186
1834	Blythe	Davis Strait	5	77

In 1834 Wright & Co. withdrew Brunswick from whaling and put her into general trade.

Year	Master	Owner	Trade	Notes and source
1836	Smith	Wright & Co.	Hull–Quebec; Hull	Damage and small repairs in 1837; LR
1839	T.Porter	Wright & Co.	Hull–New York; Hull–Sierra Leone	Large repair 1839; LR
1840	T.Porter	Wright & Co.	Hull–Sierra Leone; London	Large repair 1839; LR
1841	T.Porter	Wright & Co.	London; Hull–East India	Large repair 1839; LR

== Fate ==
Brunswick, Porter, master, was wrecked on 7 April 1842 on the Sunk Sand, in the North Sea off the coast of Suffolk. The smack Good Agreement, Brown, master, rescued the crew and brought them into Wivenhoe. Brunswick was on a voyage from Hull to London.

The entry for Brunswick in Lloyd's Register for 1841 bears the annotation "Wrecked".
