= British Tenpin Bowling Association =

- Sport: Tenpin Bowling
- Abbreviation: BTBA
- Founded: 1961
- Affiliation: International Bowling Federation
- Chairperson: Lisa John
- Secretary: David Steiner

Official website
- www.btba.org.uk
- (United Kingdom)

The British Tenpin Bowling Association (BTBA) is the official governing body of ten-pin bowling in the United Kingdom, affiliated to Sport England.

It is the official sanctioning body, recognised by International Bowling Federation, the sport's world governing body, for all competitions, leagues and tournaments held in the UK, and is the organisation responsible for the protection, integrity and development of the sport. It also oversees coaching for tenpin bowling at all levels, and is the official awarding body for formal coaching qualifications. The BTBA had a monthly magazine to keep members up to date with the latest news in the sport but nowadays news can mainly be found on Facebook.

== History ==
The first British tenpin bowling centre opened at Stamford Hill. The two principal American manufacturers of tenpin machinery - AMF and Brunswick - had expanded their operations to the UK when it became apparent that they had virtually saturated their home market in the US at the end of the 1950s. The American Bowling Congress (ABC) took an interest in this expansion and helped British bowlers to set up their own governing body.

The BTBA was formed on 26 May 1961. The General Secretary was Maurice Glazer, at that time a professional photographer in Dalston, East London. His shop became the first official residence of the Association. One of its original roles was to provide official recognition for newcomers to the fledgling sport of tenpin bowling as it grew in popularity across the UK.

It standardised rules and playing regulations, laid down guidelines and provided an independent governing body to which reference could be made in the event of disagreement.

The rule-book was copied almost verbatim from the ABC version. The annual membership subscription was five shillings), which at the prevailing exchange rate was the Sterling equivalent of the ABC's annual subscription of US$1. With about half-a-million members the ABC found this rate to provide them with adequate funds, but it was insufficient to run the BTBA, given that only a few thousand British bowlers were members.

Authority was delegated to each of the counties under the auspices of local area representatives. Some of the area representatives soon came into conflict with the bowling centre proprietors, for example insisting on costly re-surfacing of lanes, which they argued was unnecessary. The proprietors rebelled and set up their own rival organisation, the Tenpin Bowling Proprietors Association (TBPA), in 1967. An Annual General Meeting of the BTBA saw this conflict rise to a head and most of the governing council resigned, leaving Glazer to regroup and bring back all decisions to the BTBA head office. It took several years to achieve a rapprochement with the proprietors.

Glazer continued to follow his instincts in what he believed to be the best interest of British bowlers, became President of FIQ and was awarded an MBE for his service to the sport.

The BTBA has continued to have a considerable impact on the sport, however in recent times has struggled to engage with the next generation of bowlers. As bowling transitions from "sport" to "leisure", and bowling centres remove restrictions like the need to wear Bowling Shoes, Bowling as a sport is in huge decline in the UK. A large percentage of bowling leagues did not return to the centres after the COVID pandemic.

== British Tenpin Bowling Coaching Association ==
The 'British Tenpin Bowling Coaching Association (BTBCA) is a sub-section of the British Tenpin Bowling Association Although associated under the umbrella group of the BTBA, the BTBCA is run solely by a committee, elected by the members annually at the Annual General Meeting, subject to their good standing with the BTBA.

The BTBCA Chairman reports annually to the BTBA, through the BTBCA President (the BTBA Director of National Coaching currently Arthur J McDonnell MSc).

=== BTBA Coaching Qualification ===
Within the BTBCA there are 4 levels to the BTBA Coaching Qualification. These include:

- Phase I: Instructor: - approved to teach beginners.
- Phase II Instructor: - approved to teach beginners and bowlers with a limited amount of experience in the Sport.
- Phase III Coach: - approved to coach advanced bowlers including County and National levels.
- Phase IV Coach: - approved to coach at all levels, coach education, Instructor mentoring and development, setting of standards for coaching.

=== BTBCA Aim ===
According to the BTBCA website, the main aim of the BTBCA is to provide a contact point for all BTBA qualified Instructors and Coaches.

There is a two-day BTBA coaching course. The passing of this course gives a basis of knowledge from which to work, however, the only way in which people can develop their skills in coaching, is through practical experience. In gaining this experience, questions often arise, for which the answers are not immediately clear.

== Members ==
Current members include the British Tenpin Bowling Coaching Association, Hollywood Bowl, and Tenpin (formerly Megabowl) chains.
