= USS Brunswick =

Four ships of the United States Navy have been named Brunswick after Brunswick, Georgia, a seaport city located on the southeast coast of Georgia.

- USCGC Brunswick (WAL-509) was a lightship completed in 1907 for the United States Lighthouse Service. As of 1987, she had been relocated to New York for use as a floating restaurant.
- USS Brunswick (PF-68) was laid down on 16 July 1943 and decommissioned 3 May 1946.
- USS Brunswick (ATS-3) was laid down on 5 June 1968 and decommissioned on 8 March 1996. Disposed of through the Security Assistance Program, transferred to South Korea.
- USNS Brunswick (T-EPF-6) is a Spearhead-class expeditionary fast transport.
