= Brunswick (1829 ship) =

History

United Kingdom
- Name: Brunswick
- Owner: Edward Gibson
- Builder: Edward Gibson, Hull
- Cost: £4,754 18s 3d
- Launched: 1829
- Fate: Wrecked 1832
- Notes: Hackman conflates this Brunswick with Brunswick.

General characteristics
- Tons burthen: 387, or 388, or 389 (bm)

Brunswick was launched at Hull in 1829 as an East Indiaman. She sailed to India several times under a license from the British East India Company, but was wrecked in 1832.

== Career ==
Brunswick entered Lloyd's Register in 1829 with Rosendale, master, changing to A. Parker, E. Gibson, owner, and trade Hull–Calcutta. Brunswick, A. Parker, master, sailed to Chennai and Bombay on 21 April 1829. On 2 December 1831 Brunswick,, J. Palmer, master, sailed to Bengal.

== Fate ==
Brunswick, Blewett, master, wrecked on 11 October 1832 in the River Hooghly. She was returning to London from Calcutta. She wrecked on Sagar Island, India with the loss of a crew member. She was on a voyage from Bengal, India to London.
