= HMS Brunswick =

Three ships named HMS Brunswick have served the British Royal Navy:

- HMS Brunswick (1765) was launched at Oswego and served on the Great Lakes until she was condemned in 1786.
- HMS Brunswick (1790) was a 74-gun third-rate ship of the line launched at Deptford; she was broken up in 1826.
- HMS Brunswick (1855) was an 80-gun screw third rate launched at Pembroke Dockyard; she was sold in 1867.

References

- Colledge, J. J.; Warlow, Ben (2006) [1969]. Ships of the Royal Navy: The Complete Record of All Fighting Ships of the Royal Navy from the 15th Century to the Present (3rd Rev ed.). London: Chatham Publishing. ISBN 978-1-86176-281-8. OCLC 67375475.
