= Brunswick Corporation =

American corporation

- Type: Public
- Traded as: NYSE: BC; S&P 400 component
- Industry: Recreational Marine
- Founded: Cincinnati, Ohio; September 15, 1845; 180 years ago
- Founder: J. M. Brunswick
- Headquarters: Mettawa, Illinois, US
- Area served: Worldwide
- Key people: David Foulkes (CEO)
- Revenue: ▼US$5.24 billion (2024)
- Operating income: ▼US$312 million (2024)
- Net income: ▼US$130 million (2024)
- Total assets: ▼US$5.68 billion (2024)
- Total equity: ▼US$1.89 billion (2024)
- Number of employees: 15,000 (2024)
- Website: brunswick.com

Brunswick Corporation, formerly known as the Brunswick-Balke-Collender Company, is an American corporation that has developed, manufactured, and sold a wide variety of products since 1845. As of 2024, Brunswick has more than 13,000 employees in 24 countries and sales of US$5.2 billion. Its brands include Mercury Marine. Its headquarters is in the northern Chicago suburb of Mettawa, Illinois.

== History ==
=== 19th century ===
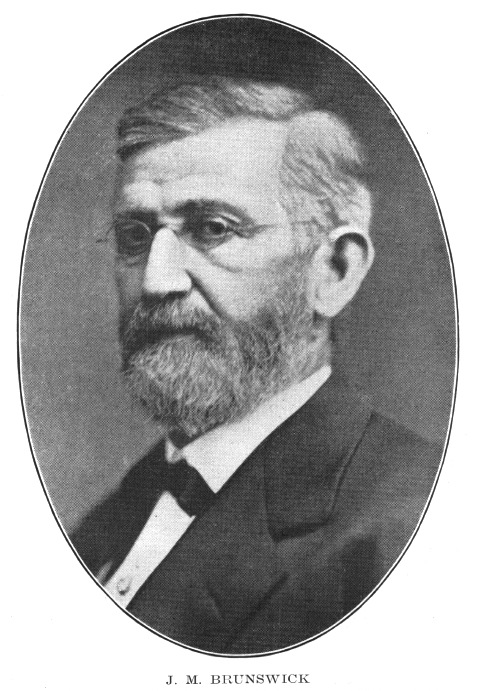
J. M. Brunswick

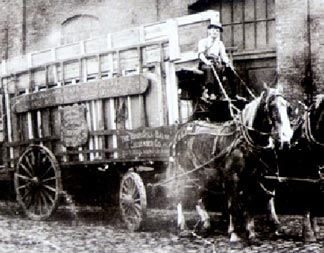
Delivery with horse carriage c. late 1800s – early 1900s

Brunswick was founded by J. M. Brunswick, who came to the US from Switzerland at the age of 15. The J. M. Brunswick Manufacturing Company opened for business on September 15, 1845, in Cincinnati, Ohio. Originally J. M. Brunswick intended his company to be mainly in the business of making carriages, but soon after opening his machine shop, he became fascinated with billiards and decided that making billiard tables would be more lucrative, as the better tables then in use in the US were imported from England. Brunswick billiard tables were a commercial success, and the business expanded and opened the first of what would become many branch offices in Chicago in 1848. It was later renamed J. M. Brunswick & Brother by 1860, after a family member came on board, and the company's slogan at this time was: "The oldest and most extensive billiard table manufacturers in the United States".

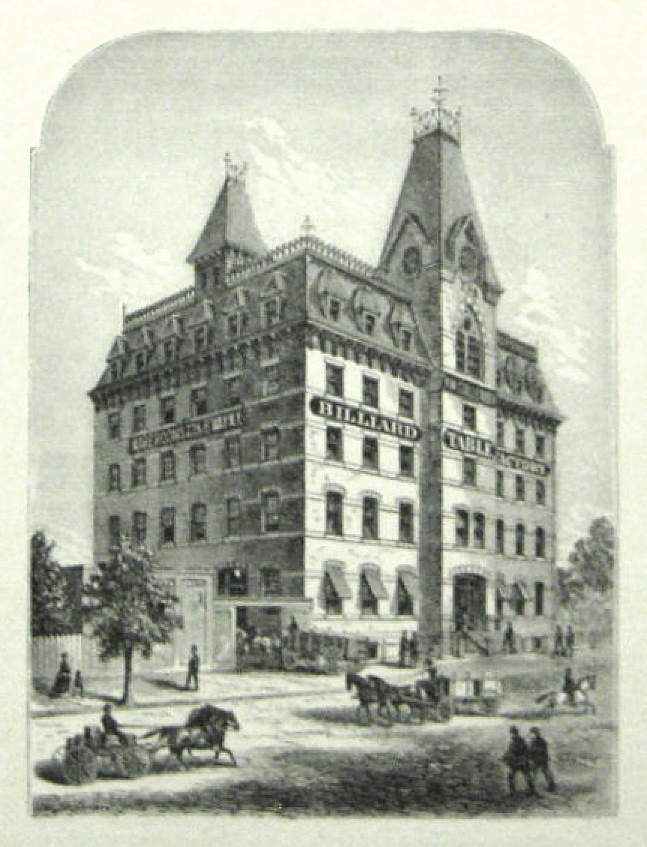
H. W. Collender Billiard Manufactory, Stanford, New York, 1870s

In 1874, the Brunswick company merged with competitor Great Western Billiard Manufactory owned by Julius Balke to become the J. M. Brunswick & Balke Company. It was incorporated in 1879 with a capital stock of $275,000, the same year it merged with another competitor, H. W. Collender Company of New York City (founded by Hugh W. Collender), to acquire Collender's patented billiard cushions. In 1884, the partners formed the Brunswick-Balke-Collender Company (or B.B.C. Company for short).

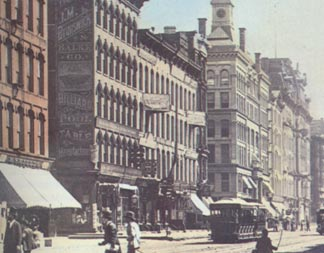
Company warehouse on State Street, Chicago 1888.

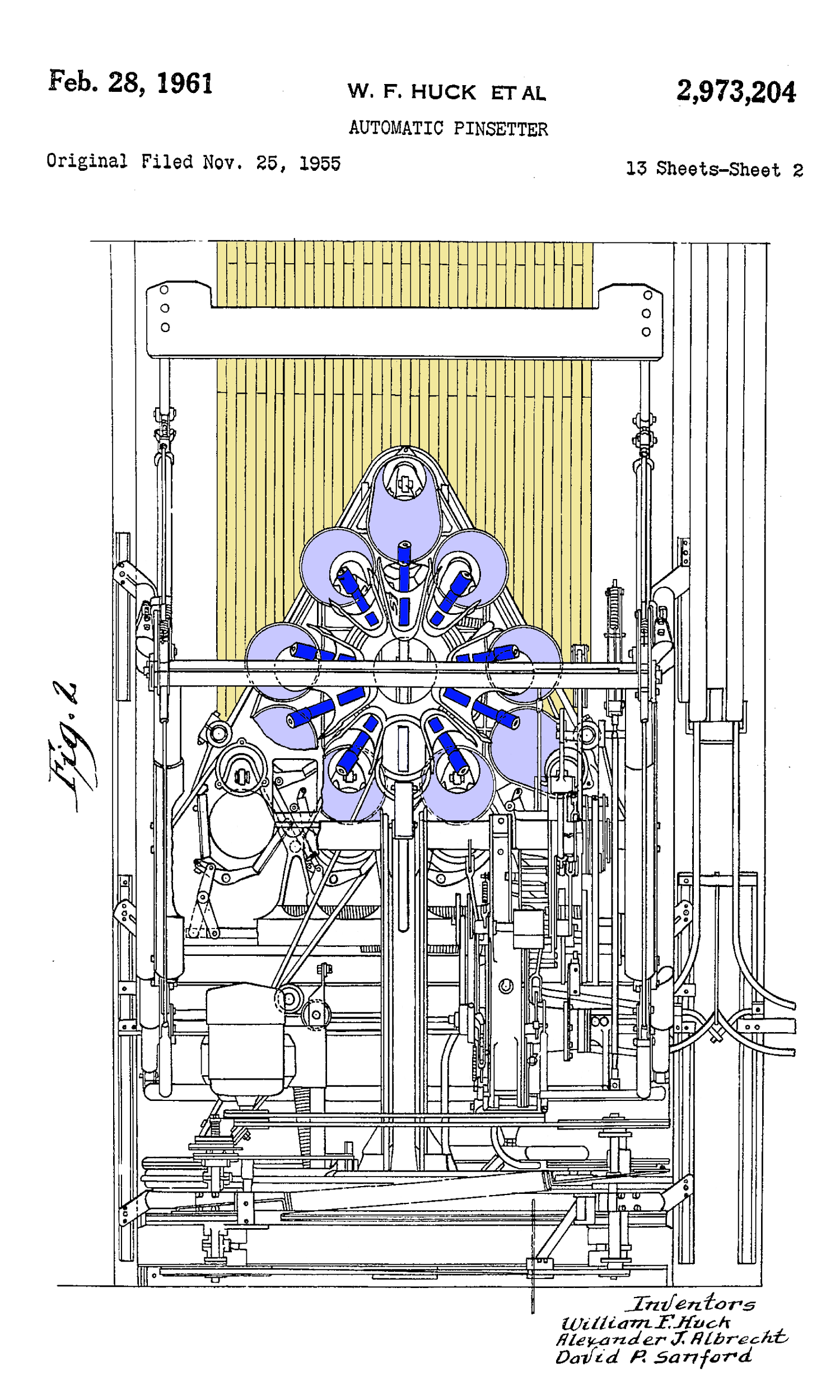
Bowling alley automatic pinsetter, US patent 2973204.

The company expanded into making a number of other products. Large ornate neo-classical style bars for saloons were a popular product. Bowling balls, pins, and equipment led a growing line of sporting equipment. It popularized bowling balls of manufactured materials, vulcanized rubber at first; earlier bowling balls had been solid wood.

=== 20th century ===
==== 1900–1949 ====
In the early 20th century, Brunswick expanded the product line to include such diverse products as toilet seats, automobile tires, and phonographs. In the late 1910s, they introduced a quickly popular line of disc phonograph records, under the name Brunswick Records. In 1930, Brunswick sold the control of the record company to Warner Brothers and came out with a line of refrigerators.

During World War II, Brunswick-Balke-Collender made small target-drone aircraft for the US military. After the war, Brunswick introduced a line of school furniture. In 1949, the Brunswick "Model A" Mechanical Pinsetter fully automated unit premiered, for the purpose of handling bowling pins for ten-pin bowling, in competition with American Machine and Foundry (AMF). Previously, Brunswick had made two models of semi-automated, manually operated "spotting tables" for the tenpin sport, that the "Model A" unit replaced.

A historical marker at 623 S. Wabash Ave. in Chicago was dedicated by the Illinois State Historical Society in 1995 at the site of Brunswick's headquarters from 1913 to 1964. The building today is used by Columbia College Chicago.

==== 1950–1999 ====
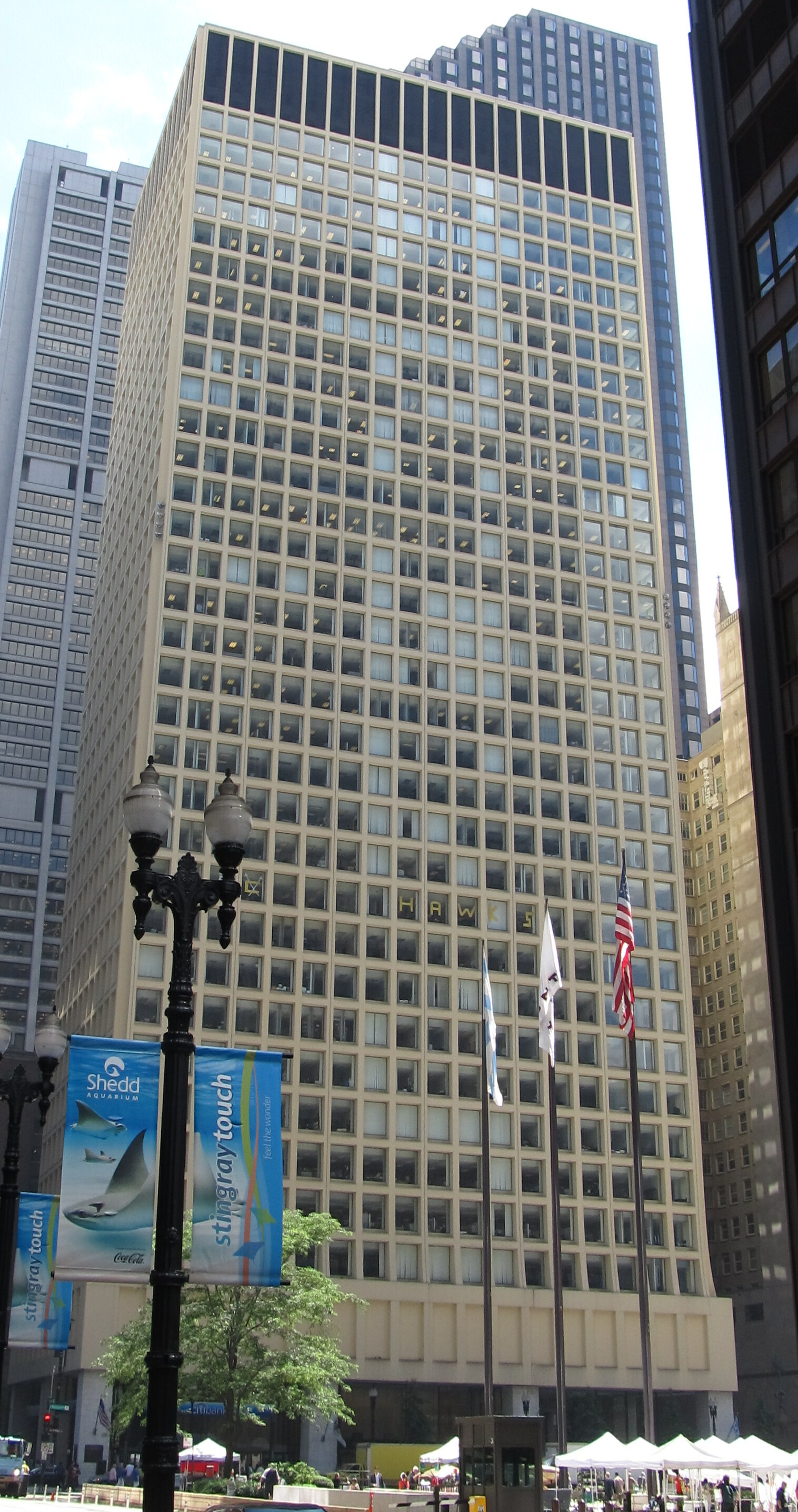
The Cook County Administration Building (originally "Brunswick Building"), where the company relocated its headquarters in the 1960s

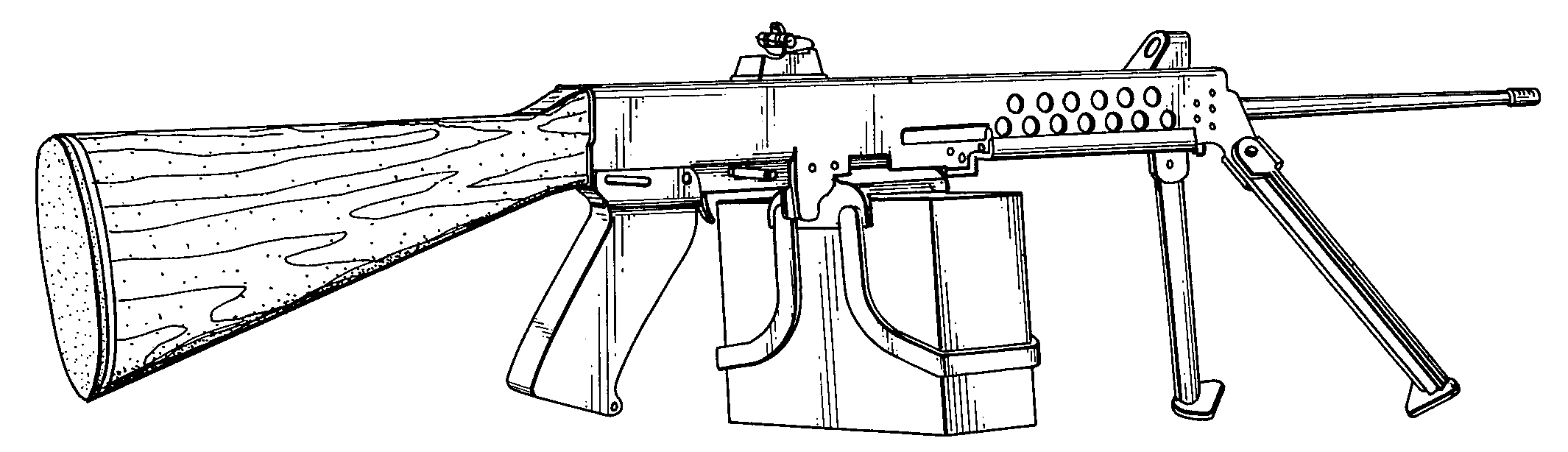
Brunswick 6x45mm SAW light machine gun, US patent 4066000A

The 1950s also saw the introduction of a line of golfing equipment to compete with AMF in the leisure-products and sporting-goods markets.

The Brunswick-Balke-Collender Company officially changed its name to the Brunswick Corporation on April 10, 1960. The following year the company reported sales of $422 million. Brunswick acquired Mercury Marine in 1961. In the 1970s, Brunswick introduced the automatic scorer, which electronically tallied the score instead of the bowler doing it by hand.

With the company experiencing substantial revenue growth in the 1950s, it began considering relocating its corporate headquarters. In the 1960s, it moved its corporate headquarters from the South Wabash Avenue location that it had occupied for six decades to a new modernist-style skyscraper engineered by Fazlur Khan of Skidmore, Owings & Merrill and developed by Arthur Rubloff's firm. The new Brunswick Building was built in the Chicago Loop, next to the new Chicago Civic Center (today known as Richard J. Daley Center). The 1960s-built Brunswick Building was later bought by the government of Cook County, Illinois in 1996, and is today known as the "George W. Dunne Cook County Administration Building".

The Brunswick Corporation patented a machine gun using a delayed blowback operation via a fluted chamber as part of the weapon's operation. Another platform was the Rifleman's Assault Weapon, an unusual grenade launcher that used a spherical rocket propelled grenade.

In the 1980s, Brunswick became a major maker of yachts and pleasure boats, under brands including Bayliner, Boston Whaler, Maxum, Sea Ray and Trophy.

During the Gulf War, Brunswick supplied the military with camouflage nets. They also made radomes for the Patriot missile.

In 1997, Brunswick purchased the Roadmaster bicycle division, one of the last US manufacturers of low-cost, mass-market bicycles. However, it became apparent that continued US manufacture of such products was not viable in the presence of surging low-priced imports from overseas producers, primarily China. In 1999, Brunswick sold its Roadmaster bicycle division and brand to Pacific Cycle.

=== 21st century ===
==== 2000s ====
As of the early 21st century, the Brunswick Corporation still manufactured sporting and fitness equipment (Life Fitness, Hammer Strength, Parabody) in addition to boats (Sea Ray, Bayliner, Maxum, etc.) and marine engines under the Mercury Marine brand name.

In 2001, Brunswick acquired Hatteras Yachts from Genmar Industries for approximately $80 million in cash. Brunswick sold its Hatteras/Cabo brand in 2013 to Versa Capital Management.

In 2004, Brunswick acquired Lowe Boats. The same year, the company also purchased Northstar Technologies, a leading marine electronics provider based in Acton, Massachusetts, from Canadian Marconi Corporation (now CMC Electronics, a wholly owned subsidiary of Esterline Technologies Corporation). Brunswick then merged Navman, based in Auckland, New Zealand, with Northstar to make Northstar/Navman a supplier to the Brunswick Boat Groups. Brunswick also acquired Mx-Marine. When George Buckley, CEO at the time, left to join 3M in 2006, new leadership decided to sell Northstar, Navman and Mx-Marine to Navico. Brunswick has established regional headquarters in Verviers, Belgium; Monterrey, Mexico; Dandenong, Australia; and Dubai, UAE, to better serve its customers by designing, engineering, manufacturing and distributing products based on local needs, using local talent.

==== 2010s ====
On July 17, 2014, Brunswick announced plans to leave the bowling business by the end of 2014. The company disclosed that it had agreed to sell its bowling center business, which brought in $187 million in revenue in the prior year, to competitor Bowlmor AMF (now known as Bowlero Corporation) for $270 million. It also disclosed that it had retained Lazard to find a buyer for its bowling equipment and products business. The company said it was making these changes to focus on its “core” Marine and Fitness businesses, which provided 92% of company net revenues in 2013. It would retain its heritage billiards business and report billiards financial results as part of the Fitness segment. The sale of the bowling center business to Bowlmor AMF (Bowlero) was completed in September 2014.

Brunswick completed its exit from the bowling business in May 2015 with the sale of its bowling equipment and products division to BlueArc Capital Management, a private investment firm. BlueArc completed the acquisition with investments from Gladstone Investment Corporation, and Capitala Finance Corp. BlueArc continues to produce bowling balls under the Brunswick and DV8 brand names, and on November 15, 2019, it acquired Ebonite International and all of its bowling product brands.

In August 2018, Brunswick Corporation acquired Power Products – Global Marine & Mobile business, which includes the global marine, specialty vehicle, mobile, industrial power, and transportation aftermarket products businesses of Power Products, for $910 million in cash from San Francisco-based private equity firm Genstar Capital.

Also in 2018, the company announced it would be separating the fitness business as Life Fitness Holdings in 2019. In May 2019, Brunswick announced the sale of Brunswick Billiards, Life Fitness, Cybex, Hammer Strength, Indoor Cycling Group, and SCIFIT for $490 million to KPS Capital Partners. The sale was completed in June 2019.

In May 2019, Brunswick announced it would be purchasing Freedom Boat Club, the largest marine franchisor in the US.

Also in 2019, Brunswick announced a new business structure, Advanced Systems Group (ASG) and named Brett Dibkey as president. ASG is composed of 11 Power Products brands combined with the Attwood Group of businesses including Attwood, Garelick, MotorGuide, and Whale, as well as NAUTIC-ON.

==== 2020s ====
On October 4, 2021, Brunswick Corporation announced that it has completed its acquisition of Navico, a manufacturer of marine electronics and sensors for $1.05 billion, adding back to Brunswick the industry sector it had earlier divested.

== See also ==
- Brunswick-Balke-Collender Cup
- List of sporting goods manufacturers
