= American National Biography =

Biographical encyclopedia

- Country: United States
- Language: English
- Publisher: Oxford University Press for the American Council of Learned Societies
- Published: 1999 (24 vols.); 2002 (1st Supplement); 2005 (2nd Supplement)
- Media type: Print, Digital
- No. of books: 26
- Preceded by: Dictionary of American Biography
- Website: www.anb.org

The American National Biography (ANB) is a 24-volume biographical encyclopedia set that contains about 17,400 entries and 20 million words, first published in 1999 by Oxford University Press under the auspices of the American Council of Learned Societies.

== Background ==
A supplement with more than 400 new biographies appeared in 2002, and a second supplement of over 500 new biographies appeared in 2005. Additional funding came from the Rockefeller Foundation, the Andrew W. Mellon Foundation and the National Endowment for the Humanities.

The ANB bills itself as the successor of the Dictionary of American Biography, which was first published between 1926 and 1937. It is not, however, a strict superset of this older publication; the selection of topics was made anew.

It is commonly available in the reference sections of United States libraries, and is available online by subscription (see external links).

== Awards and reception ==
In 1999, the American Library Association awarded the American National Biography its Dartmouth Medal as a reference work of outstanding quality and significance. The American Historical Association's Waldo G. Leland Prize was awarded for 2001.

It has been criticized for missing cross references and occasional errors, and for its cost, which is said to limit availability in poor countries.

== Selected access ==
- American National Biography. Vol. 24 Vols. American Council of Learned Societies, by Oxford University Press. 1999 – via Internet Archive (full access) & Google Books (snippet view). LCCN 98-20826 (full set); ISBN 0-1952-0635-5 (full set); & 468280018 (full set).

General editors: John Arthur Garraty, PhD (1920–2007) & Mark Christopher Carnes, PhD (born 1950)

=== Volumes via Internet Archive (full access, free, with registration) ===
→ Vol. 1 ANB ("Aarons, Alexander A." – "Baird, Spencer Fullerton"). 1999. ISBN 0195127803; OCLC 246050663 (all editions).

→ Vol. 2 ANB ("Baker, Belle" – "Blatch, Harriet Stanton"). 1999. ISBN 0195127811; OCLC 772371682 (all editions).

→ Vol. 3 ANB ("Blatchford, Richard Milford" – "Burnet, William"). 1999. ISBN 019512782X; OCLC 246051296 (all editions).

→ Vol. 4 ANB ("Burnett, Alfred" – "Clarke, Lewis G."). 1999. ISBN 0195127838; OCLC 772374229 (all editions).

→ Vol. 5 ANB ("Clarke, Mary Bayard Devereux" – "DaCosta, John Chambers"). 1999. ISBN 0195127846; OCLC 795981225 (all editions).

→ Vol. 7 ANB ("Dubuque, Julien" – "Fishbein, Morris"). 1999. ISBN 0195127862; OCLC 772374289 (all editions).

→ Vol. 8 ANB ("Fishberg, Maurice" – "Gihon, Albert Leary"). 1999. ISBN 978-0-19-520635-7. ISBN 0195127870; OCLC 795981232 (all editions).

→ Vol. 9 ANB ("Gilbert, Anne Hartley" – "Hand, Learned"). 1999. ISBN 0195127889; OCLC 772374263 (all editions).

→ Vol. 10 ANB ("Handerson, Henry Ebenezer" – "Hofmann, Josef Casimir"). 1999. ISBN 0195127897; OCLC 772371685 (all editions).

→ Vol. 11 ANB ("Hofstadter, Richard" – "Jepson, Willis Linn"). 1999. ISBN 0195127900; OCLC 795981240 (all editions).

→ Vol. 12 ANB ("Jeremiah, Thomas" – "Kurtz, Benjamin"). 1999. ISBN 0195127919; OCLC 246051972 (all editions).

→ Vol. 13 ANB ("Kurtzman, Harvey" – "Lovecraft, H.P."). 1999. ISBN 0195127927; OCLC 772371685 (all editions).

→ Vol. 14 ANB ("Lovejoy, Arthur O." – "McCurdy, Richard Aldrich"). 1999. ISBN 0195127935; OCLC 772363691 (all editions).

→ Vol. 15 ANB ("McCutcheon, Floretta Doty" – "Moskowitz, Belle Lindner Israels"). 1999. ISBN 0195127943; OCLC 246052109 (all editions).

→ Vol. 17 ANB ("Park, Edwards Amasa" – "Pushmataha"). 1999. ISBN 019512796X; OCLC 772371687 (all editions).

→ Vol. 19 ANB ("Rousseau, Lovell Harrison" – "Simmons, William Joseph"). 1999. ISBN 0195127986; OCLC 795981272 (all editions).

→ Vol. 20 ANB ("Simms, Florence" – "Stratemeyer, George Edward"). 1999. ISBN 0195127994; OCLC 246052393 (all editions).

→ Vol. 21 ANB ("Stratton, Eugene" – "Tunney, Gene"). 1999. ISBN 0195128001; OCLC 795981277 (all editions).

→ Vol. 23 ANB ("Wellek, René" – "Wrenn, Robert Duffield"). 1999. ISBN 0195128028; OCLC 1003045645 (all editions).

=== Volumes via Google Books ===
→ Vol. 6 ANB ("Dafora, Asadata" – "Dubuclet, Antoine"). 1999 – via Google Books (snippet view). ISBN 0195127854; OCLC 246050949 (all editions).

→ Vol. 16 ANB ("Mosler, Henry" – "Parish, Peggy"). 1999 – via Google Books (snippet view). ISBN 0195127951; OCLC 795981253 (all editions).

→ Vol. 18 ANB ("Putnam, Alice Harvey Whiting" – "Roush, Edd J."). 1999 – via Google Books (snippet view). ISBN 0195127978; OCLC 795981268 (all editions).

→ Vol. 22 ANB ("Tunnicliff, Ruth May" – "Welk, Lawrence"). 1999 – via Google Books (snippet view). ISBN 0-1951-2801-X; OCLC 772363698 (all editions).

→ Vol. 24 ANB ("Wright, Austin Tappan" – "Zworykin, Vladimir Kosma"). 1999 – via Google Books (snippet view). ISBN 0-1951-2803-6; OCLC 246052970 (all editions).

→ Supplement 1: "Cumulative Occupations Index" ANB. 2002 – via Google Books (snippet view). LCCN 2003-541662 (Supps. 1 & 2); ISBN 0195150635, 9780195150636 OCLC 52547928 (all editions).

→ Supplement 2: "Cumulative Index by Occupations and Realms of Renown" ANB. 2005 – via Google Books. LCCN 2003-541662 (Supps. 1 & 2); ISBN 9780195222029, 0195222024; OCLC 52547928 (all editions).

=== Via online ===
- "American National Biography Online". Oxford University Press. OCLC 39182280.

== See also ==
- Oxford Biography Index
- The National Cyclopaedia of American Biography

== Bibliography ==
=== References ===
- "AHA Award Recipients. Waldo G. Leland Prize". American Historical Association. 30 May 2007.
- "About the ANB". 2005. Archived from the original on 10 April 2007 – via Wayback Machine.
- Bartlett, Rebecca Ann (2003). Choice's Outstanding Academic Titles, 1998–2002: Reviews of Scholarly Titles That Every Library Should Own. Association of College and Research Libraries – via Google Books. LCCN 2003-11402; ISBN 978-0-8389-8232-7; OCLC 52372938 (all editions).
- "Dartmouth Medal". American Library Association.
- Fritze, Ronald H.; Coutts, Brian E.; Vyhnanek, Louis A[ndrew] (2004). "National and Regional Biographical Dictionaries". Reference Sources in History – An Introductory Guide (2nd ed.). ABC-Clio. p. 196. ISBN 9780874368833 – via Internet Archive. LCCN 2003-25558; ISBN 978-0-87436-883-3; OCLC 963367976 (all editions).
- Rosenzweig, Roy Alan (1950–2007) (2010). Clio Wired: The Future of the Past in the Digital Age. Columbia University Press. p. 72 – via Google Books. LCCN 201001260 201-1260; ISBN 978-0-231-15085-9; OCLC 1193553990 (all editions).
- Thomas, Keith (2005). Changing Conceptions of National Biography: The Oxford DNB in Historical Perspective. Leslie Stephen Special Lecture, delivered at the Senate House, Cambridge, October 1, 2004. Cambridge University Press. p. 35 – via Google Books. LCCN 2006-295680; ISBN 978-0-5216-7118-7; OCLC 474885240 (all editions).
- Winkler, Anthony C. (1942–2015); McCuen-Metherell, Jo Ray (née Joyce Raymonde Beach; born 1929) (2011) [1979]. Writing the Research Paper: A Handbook (8th ed.). Cengage Learning. p. 24. ISBN 978-0-4957-9964-1; OCLC 760860482 (all editions).
- Yale University News (20 July 2009). "Oxford University Press and Regional Networks Announce Strategic Alliance". Archived from the original on 9 October 2007.
