= Oxford Biography Index =

Oxford University Press authority file

- Website type: authority file
- Available in: English
- Owner: Oxford University Press (OUP)
- Website: global.oup.com/oxforddnb/info/index/
- Commercial: No
- Registration: No
- Current status: Inactive

The Oxford Biography Index is an Oxford University Press (OUP) authority file. Although the index itself does not require registration, content linked from the index does. Originally a British national authority file based on the Oxford Dictionary of National Biography (Oxford DNB), it had been expanded to index some content from the American National Biography (ANB).
