= Bowling =

Class of sports in which a player rolls a ball towards a target

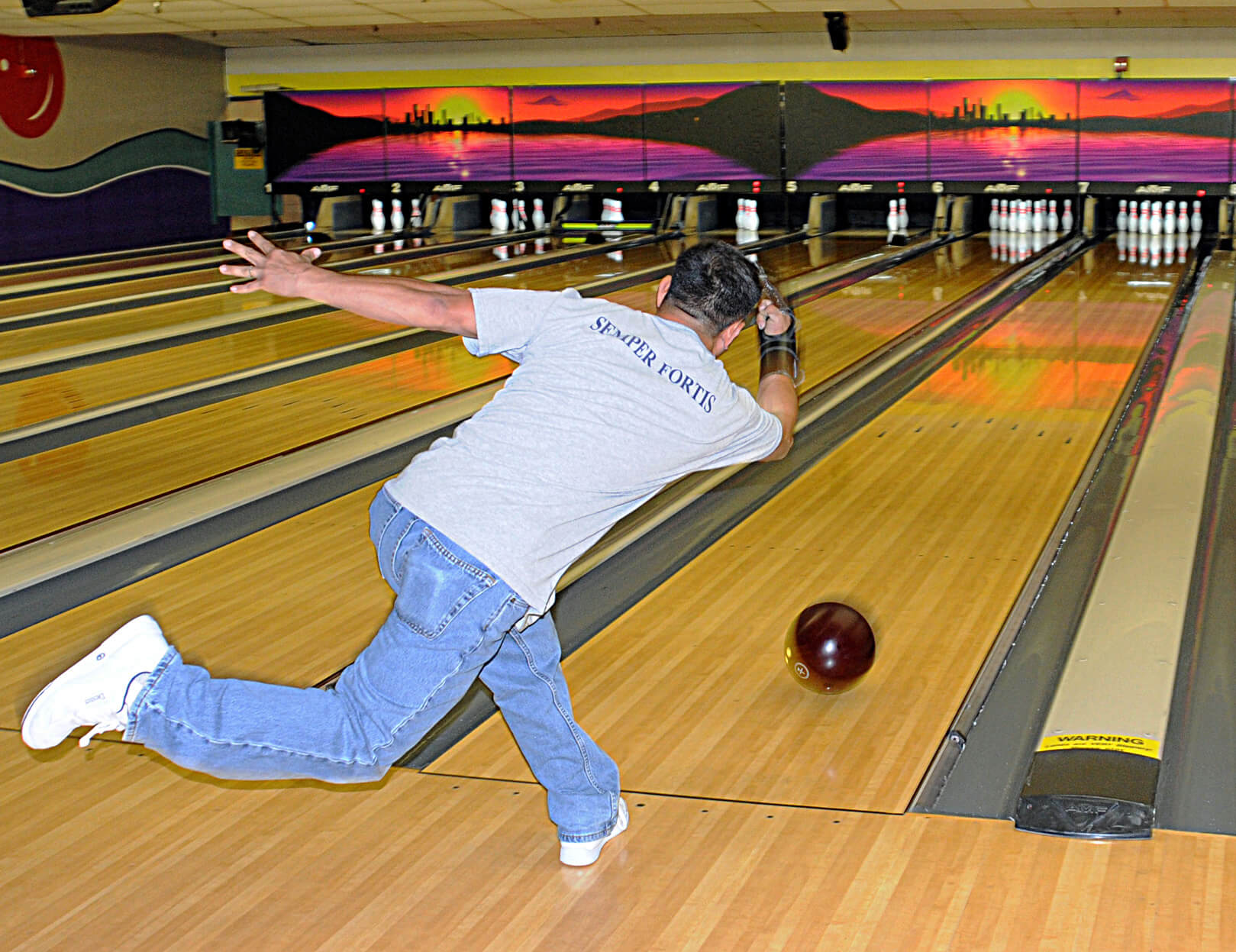
Pin bowling: a tenpin bowler at an indoor bowling alley

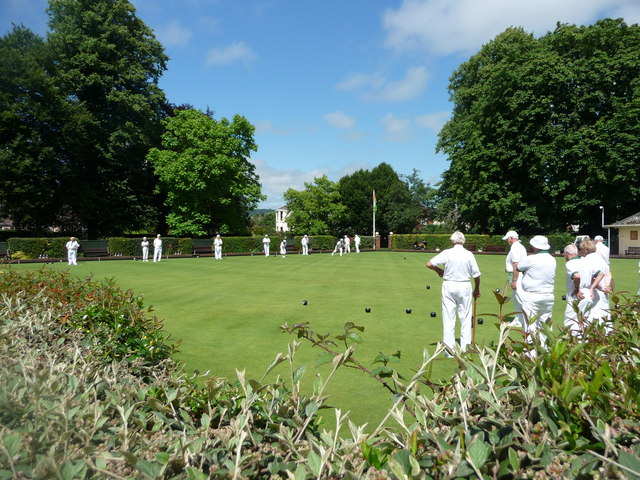
Target bowling: Bowls players at a bowling club

Bowling is a target sport and recreational activity in which a player rolls a ball toward pins (in pin bowling) or another target (in target bowling). Most references to bowling are to pin bowling, specifically tenpin bowling (played in the United Kingdom, Commonwealth countries, and elsewhere). Bowling can also refer to target bowling, such as lawn bowls. Bowling is played by 120 million people in more than 90 countries, including 70 million people in the United States.

== Types ==
Bowling is categorized into two main types: pin bowling and target bowling.

=== Pin bowling ===
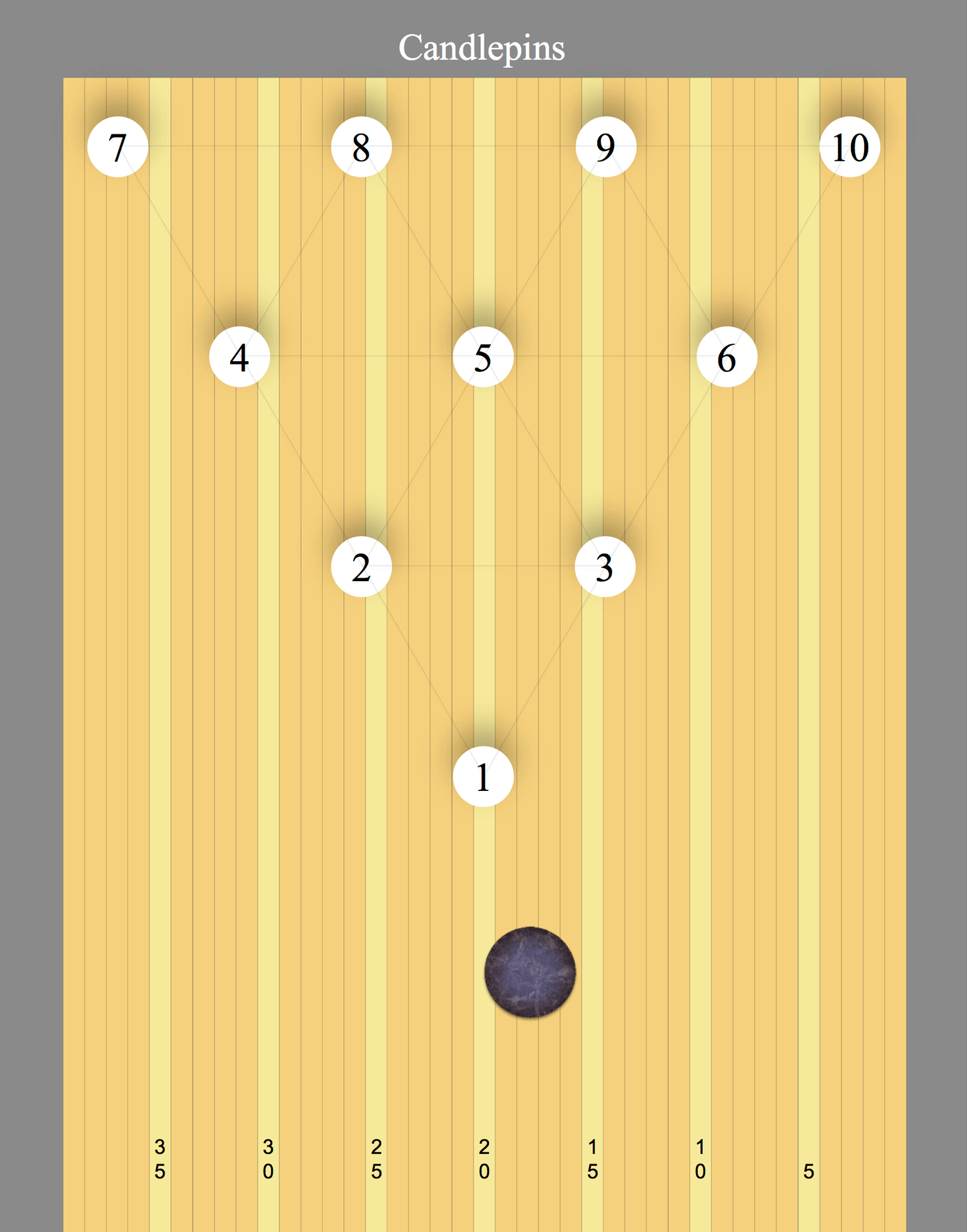
Candlepin balls are the smallest; candlepins are tallest and thinnest.

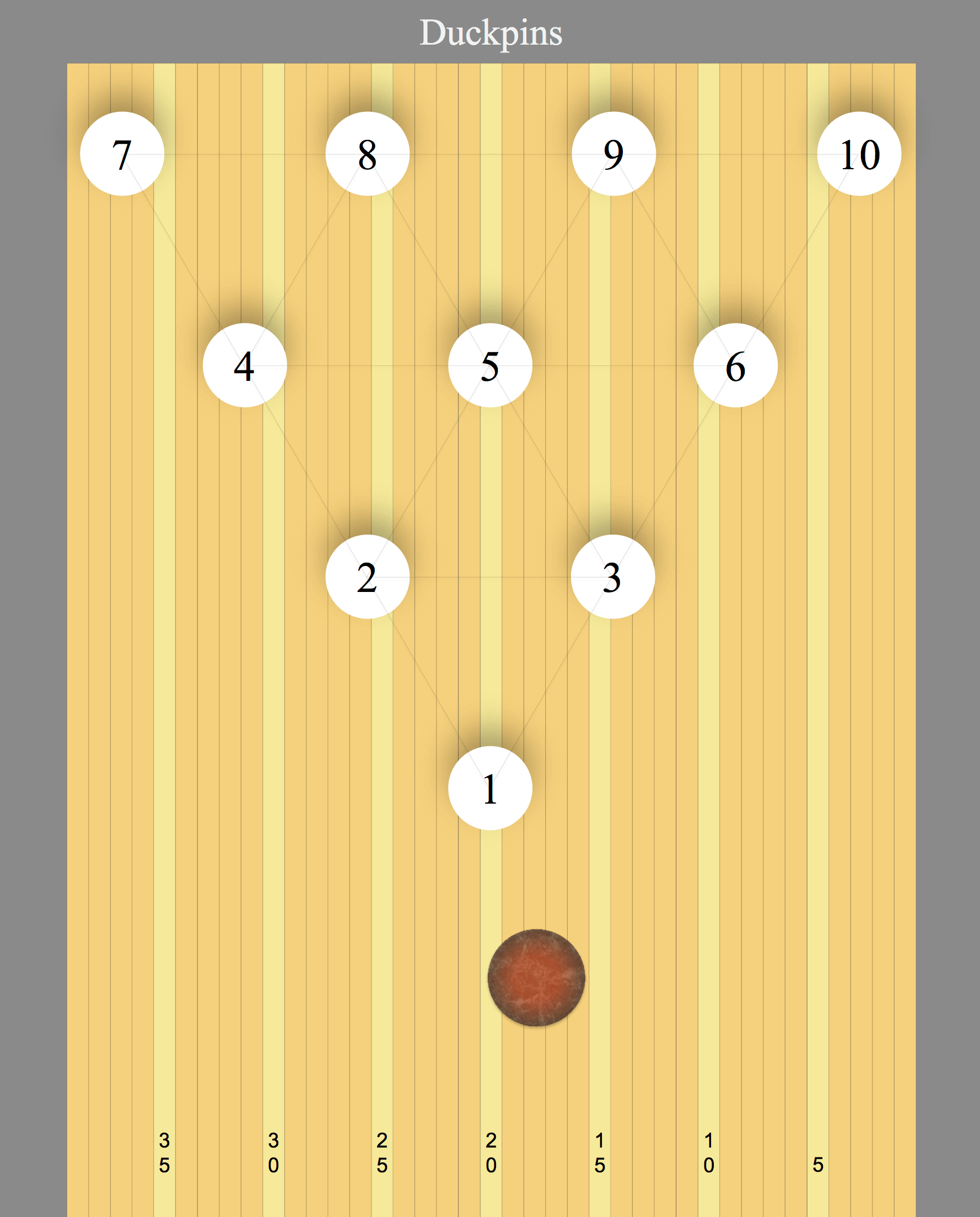
Duckpins are the shortest, and duckpin balls are barely larger than candlepin balls.

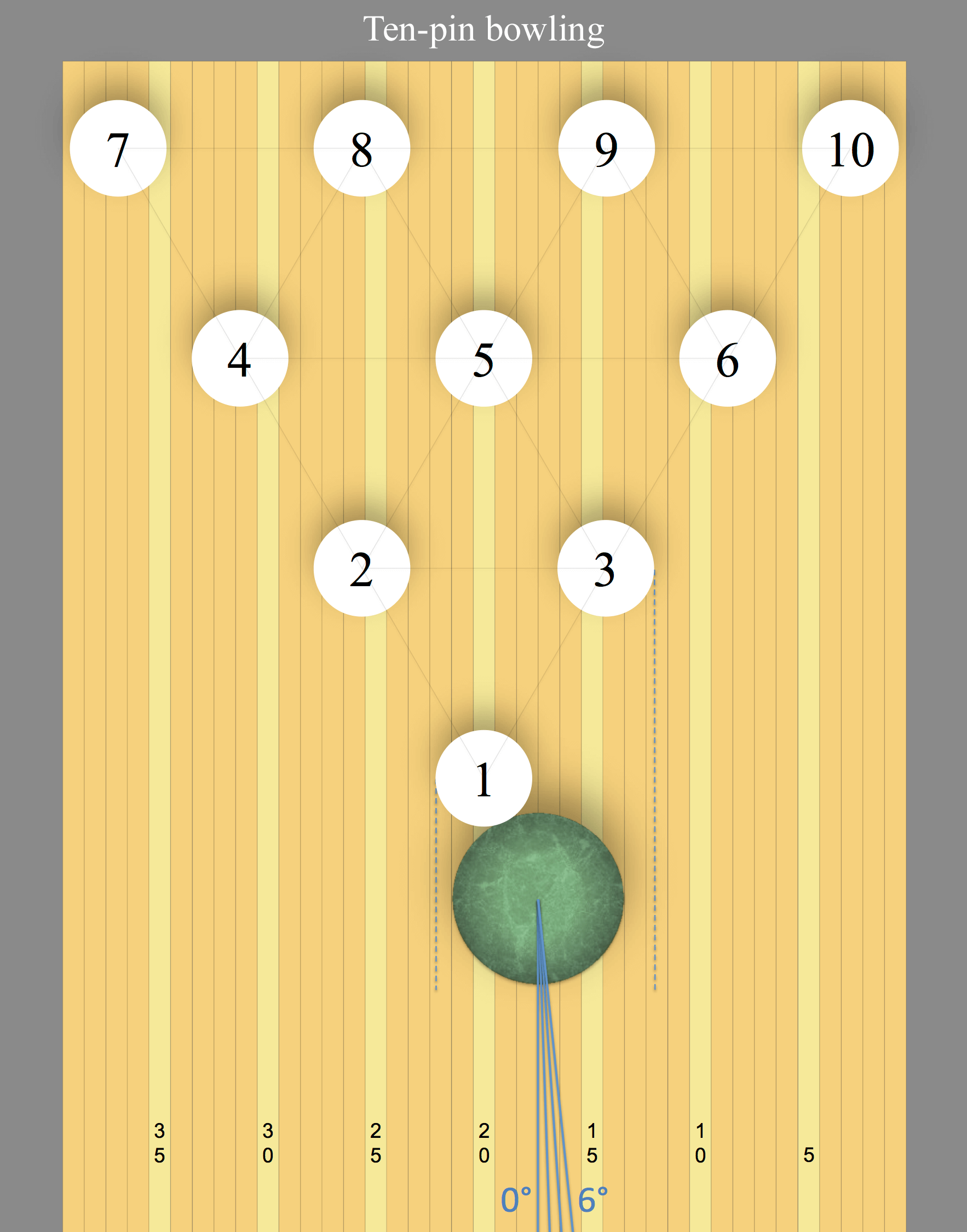
Tenpin balls and pins are the heaviest.

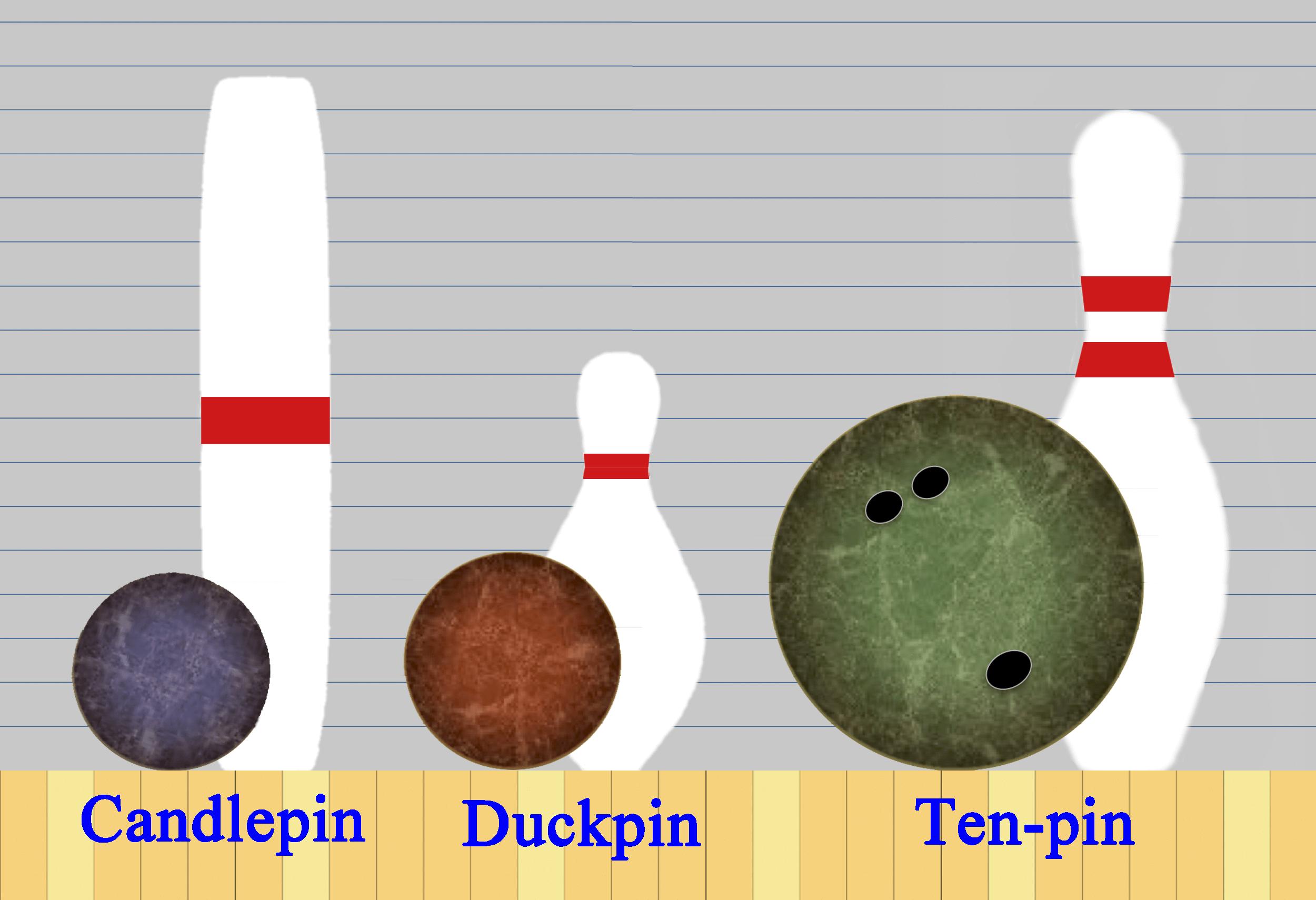
Balls and pins from three types of pin bowling. Horizontal lines are one inch apart.

In pin bowling, players knock over pins at the end of a long, smooth surface known as a lane. Lanes have a wooden or synthetic surface with a protective lubricant applied in various patterns that affect the ball's motion. A strike is scored when all the pins are knocked down on the first roll, and a spare is scored when all pins are knocked down on the second roll. The most common type of pin bowling is tenpin bowling; variants include candlepin, duckpin, nine-pin (kegel), and five-pin. The game of skittles is the forerunner of modern pin bowling.

- Tenpin bowling is the most popular type of bowling. It involves 10 pins arranged in a triangle at the end of a bowling lane. Tenpin balls have finger holes and possibly a thumb hole. When the term bowling is used, it usually refers to tenpin bowling.
- Nine-pin bowling (commonly called kegeln in Germany) is common in Europe. It uses nine pins arranged in a diamond formation.
- Candlepin bowling: Candlepins are thinnest and tallest (40 cm (16 in)), and have matching top and bottom ends. Candlepin balls are the smallest and lightest (1.1 kg (2.4 lb)) of any bowling sport. Fallen candlepins not cleared during a frame.
- Duckpin bowling: Duckpin bowling is similar to tenpin, but with shorter pins and a smaller ball having no holes.
- Five-pin bowling: Five-pins are taller than duckpins but shorter than tenpins, are between duckpins and candlepins in diameter, and have a rubber girdle. Five-pin balls are small and without holes. The sport is practiced primarily in Canada.

=== Target bowling ===
Target bowling is usually played outdoors on a specially-prepared lawn or natural terrain, like grass Depending on the game, players roll or throw a ball in an attempt to land it closest to a mark or target ball in the arena.

Lawn bowls, bocce, carpet bowls, pétanque, and boules have indoor and outdoor varieties. Curling may be considered target bowling on ice.

== History ==
=== Ancient world ===
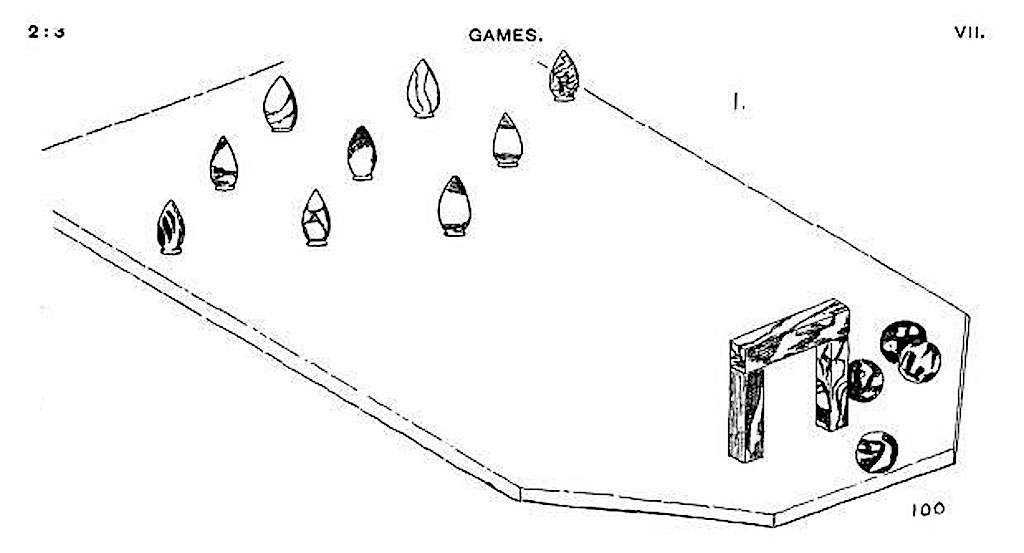
Archeologist's drawing of items found in 1895 in a tomb in Naqada, Egypt, thought to resemble the modern game of skittles. The archeologist speculated about the arrangement of the items.

The earliest known forms of bowling date back to ancient Egypt, with wall drawings depicting bowling found in a royal tomb dated to 3200 BCE and miniature pins and balls in a child's grave from the same time. Remnants of bowling balls were found among Egyptian artifacts dating back to the Egyptian protodynastic period in 3200 BCE. What is thought to be a child's game with porphyry (stone) balls, a miniature trilithon, and nine breccia-veined, alabaster vase-shaped figures thought to resemble the modern game of skittles, was found in Naqada in 1895.

Balls were made with the husks of grains, covered in a material such as leather and bound with string. Balls made of porcelain have also been found, indicating by their size and weight that they were rolled on the ground rather than thrown. Some resemble the modern jack used in target-bowling games. Bowling games were cited by Herodotus as an invention of the Lydians in Asia Minor. A similar game evolved among Roman legionaries entailing the tossing of stone objects as close as possible to other stone objects, which eventually evolved into Italian bocce (outdoor bowling). In Germany in the third or fourth century AD, a religious ritual involved cleansing oneself of sin by rolling a rock into a club (kegel) representing the heathen. Later pin bowlers were sometimes called "keglers".

=== Middle Ages ===
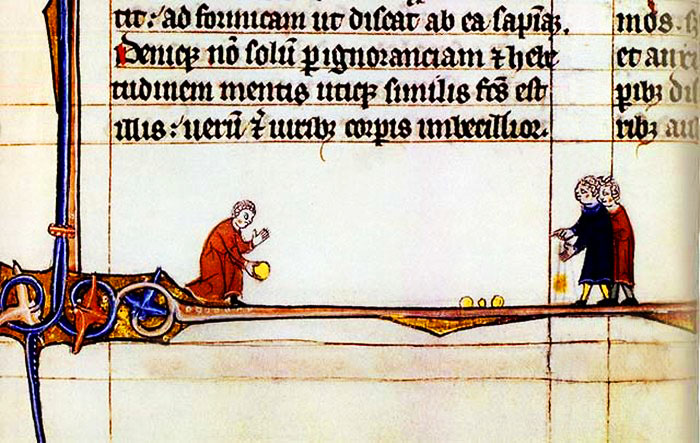
Bocce players in an illuminated manuscript

In 1299, the oldest-surviving known bowling green for target bowling was built: Master's Close, now the Old Bowling Green of the Southampton Bowling Club in Southampton, England. The green is still in use. Berlin and Cologne passed laws in 1325 limiting lawn-bowling bets to five shillings. King Edward III banned bowling as a distraction from archery practice.

From the 15th to the 17th centuries, lawn bowling spread from Germany to Austria, Switzerland, and the Low Countries. Playing surfaces were cinders or baked clay. Lawn-bowling lanes in London were first roofed in 1455, making bowling an all-weather game. Known as kegelbahns in Germany, they were often attached to taverns and guest houses. A 1463 public feast was held in Frankfurt, with a venison dinner followed by lawn bowling.

=== Modern era ===
==== 16th to 18th centuries ====
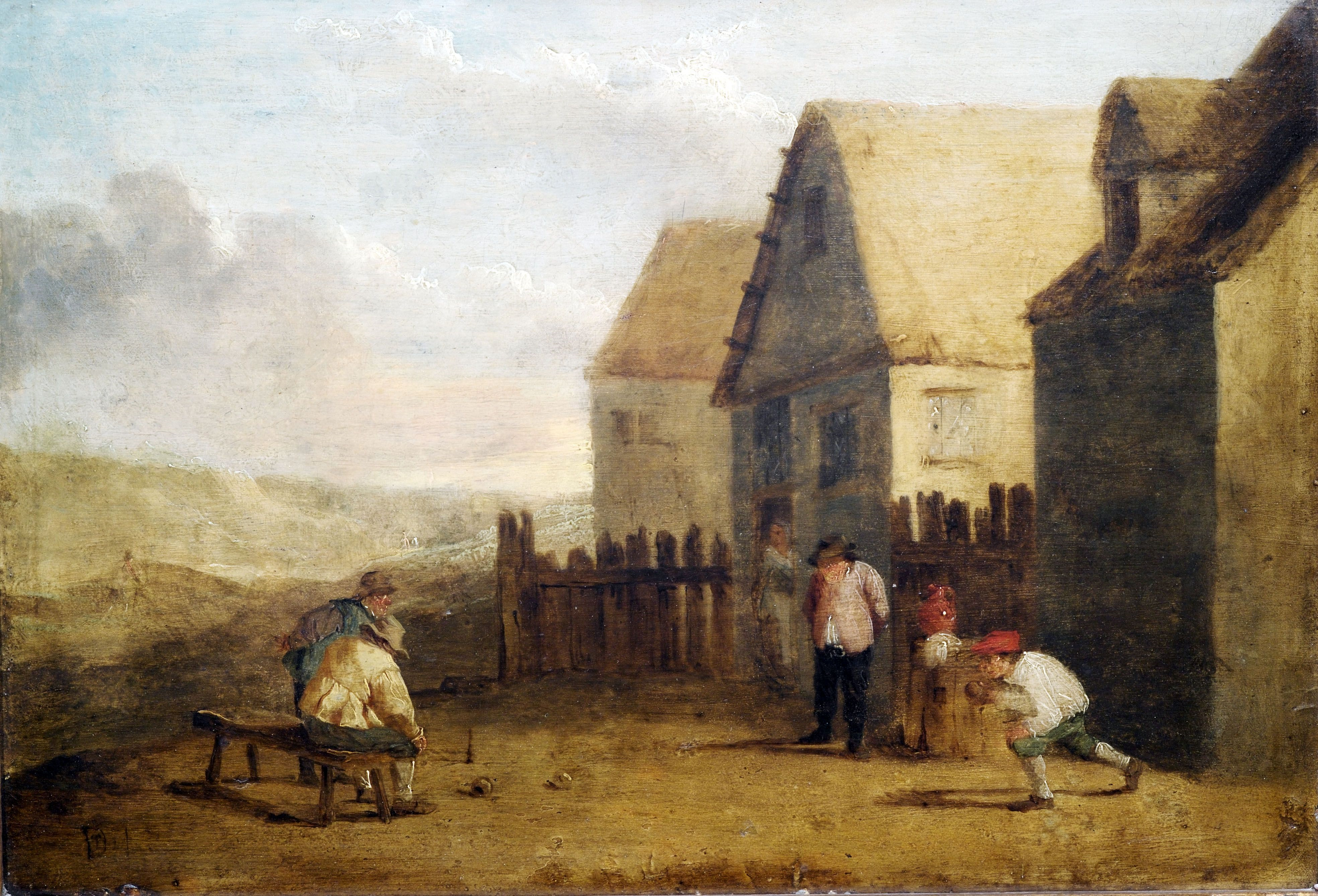
Peasants bowling in front of a 17th-century tavern

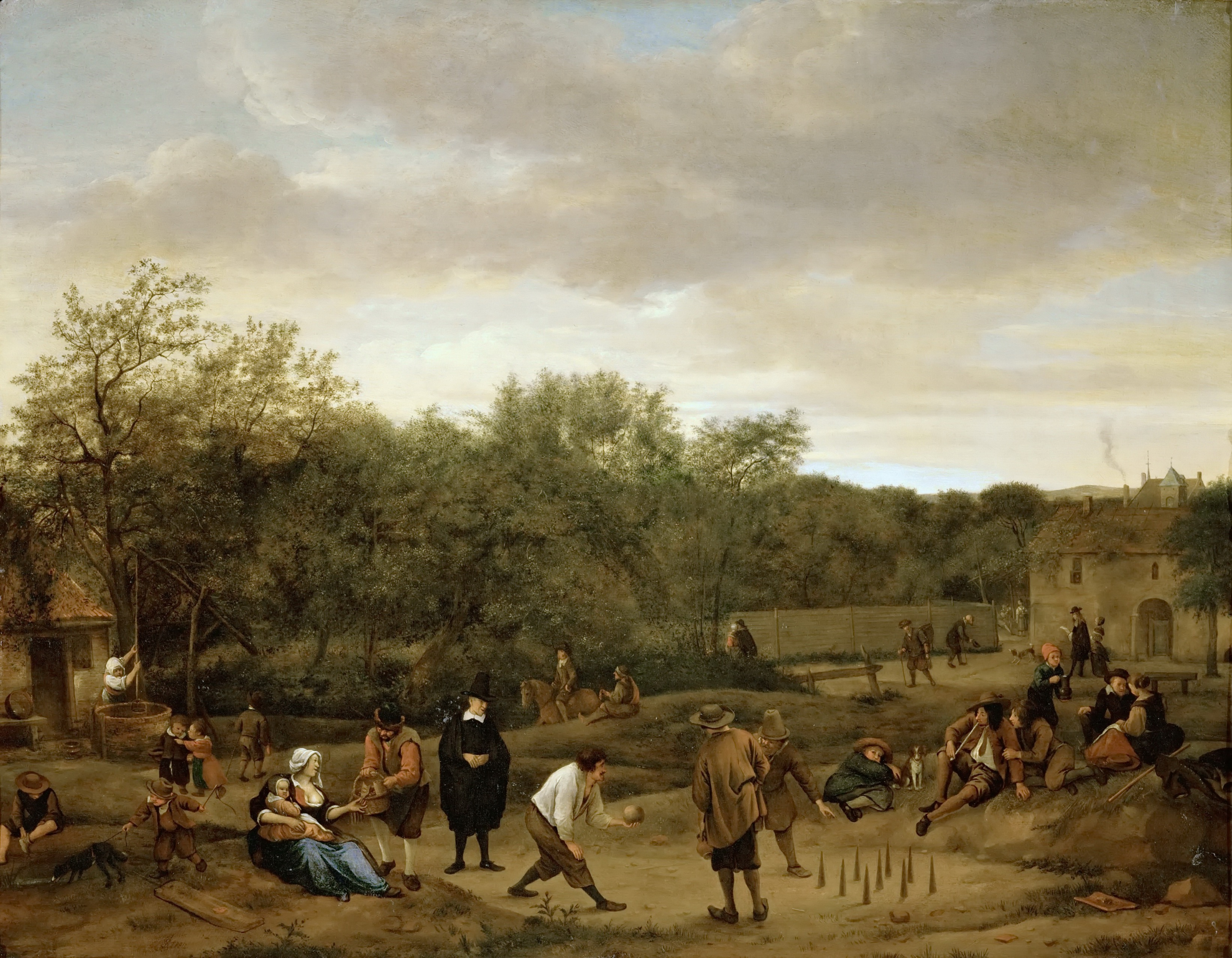
The Bowling Game (Jan Steen, c. 1655). Many Dutch Golden Age paintings depicted bowling.

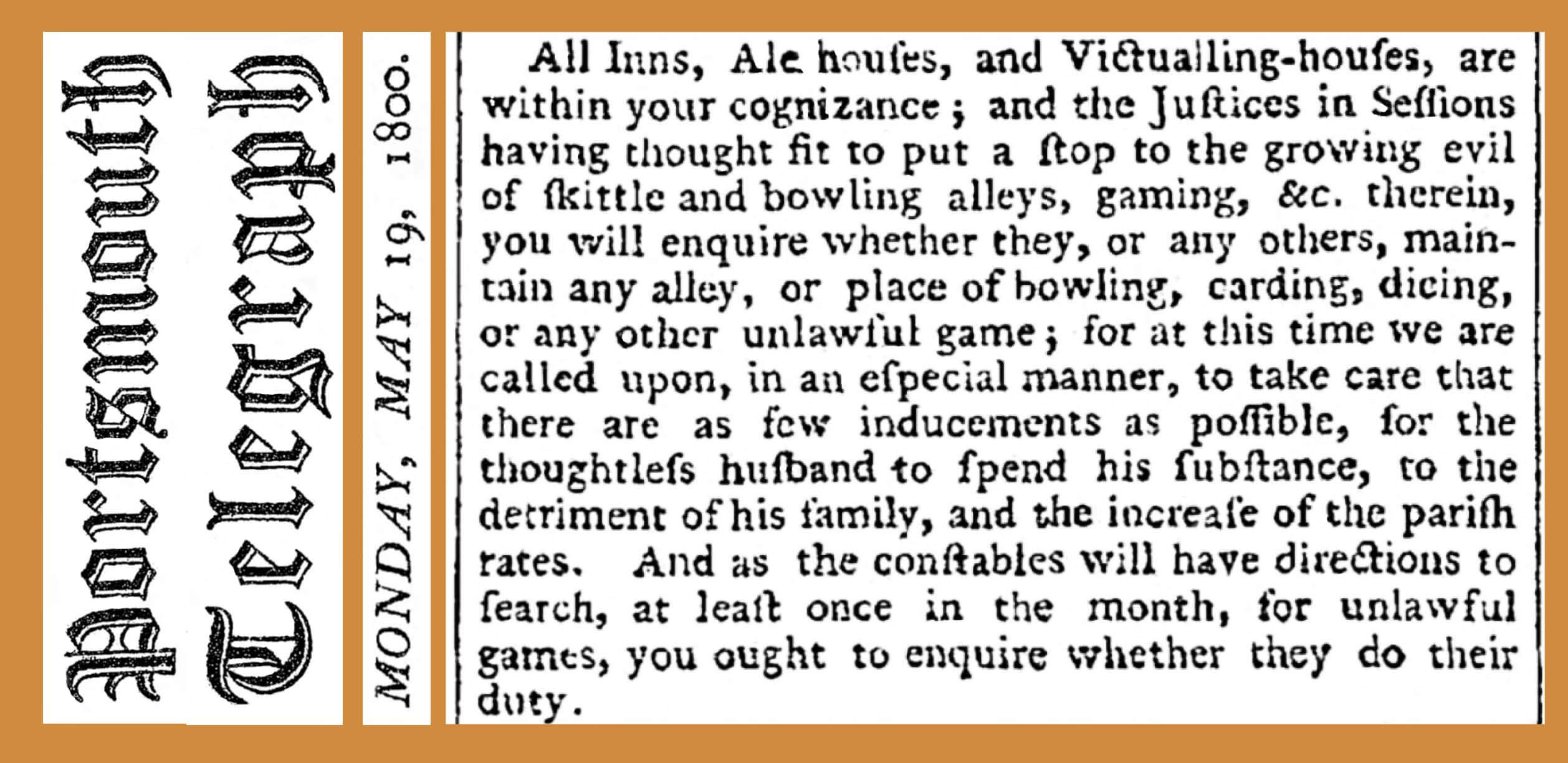
Bowling had a negative image. An 1800 English mayor proclaimed "putting a stop to the growing evil of skittle and bowling alleys ... to take care that there are as few inducements as possible for the thoughtless husband to spend his substance to the detriment of his family."

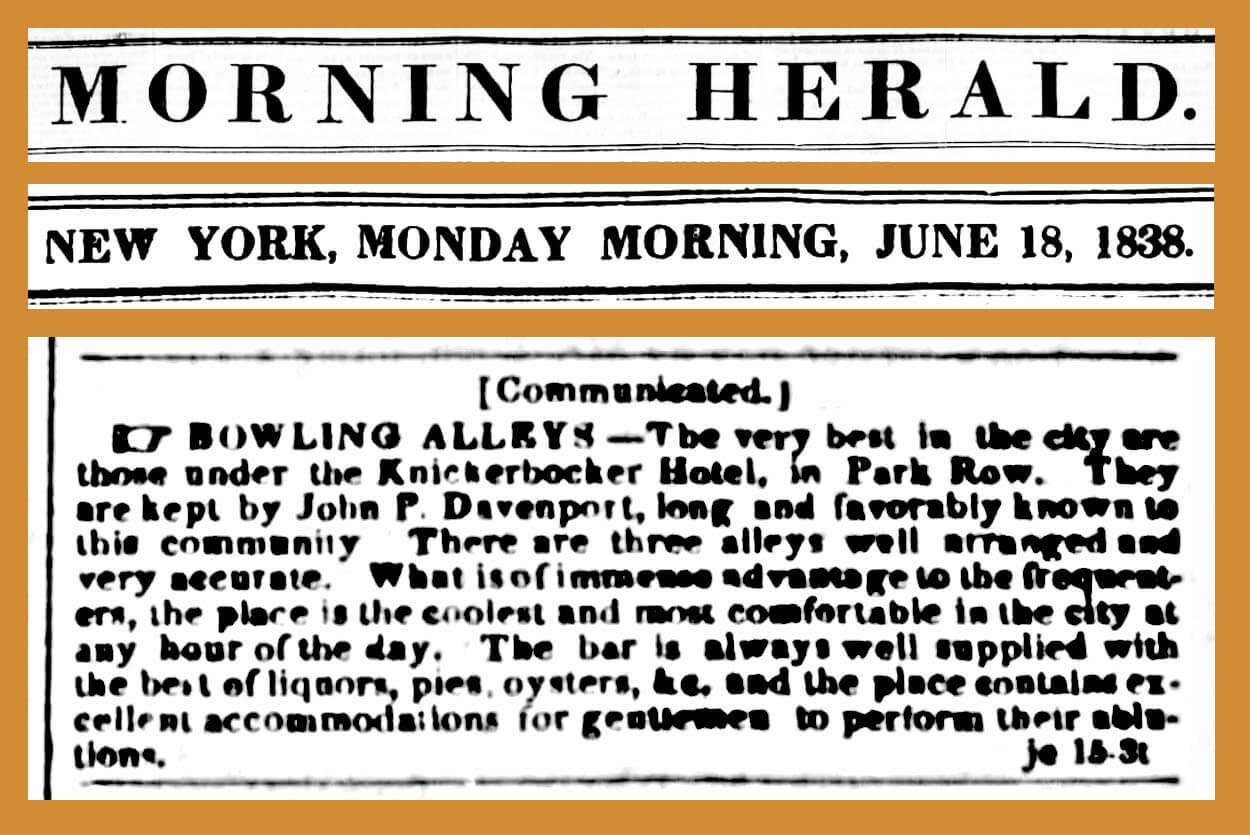
1838 New York newspaper ad for the Knickerbocker Hotel's three bowling alleys

King Henry VIII was an avid bowler. In 1511, he banned bowling for the lower classes and imposed a levy on private lanes to limit them to the wealthy. Martin Luther set the number of bowling pins (which varied from 3 to 17) at nine. He had a bowling lane built next to his home for his children, and sometimes rolled a ball himself.

On 29 July 1588, Francis Drake was reportedly playing bowls at Plymouth Hoe when the arrival of the Spanish Armada was announced; he replied, "We have time enough to finish the game and beat the Spaniards too." Henry Hudson discovered Hudson Bay in 1609, bringing Dutch colonization to New Amsterdam (later New York); Hudson's men reportedly brought a form of pin bowling with them. Late-17th-century Dutchmen enjoyed bowling at the Old King's Arms Tavern, near modern-day 2nd and Broadway in New York City. Bowling Green in New York City was built in 1733 on the site of a Dutch cattle market and parade ground, the city's oldest surviving public park.

==== 19th century ====
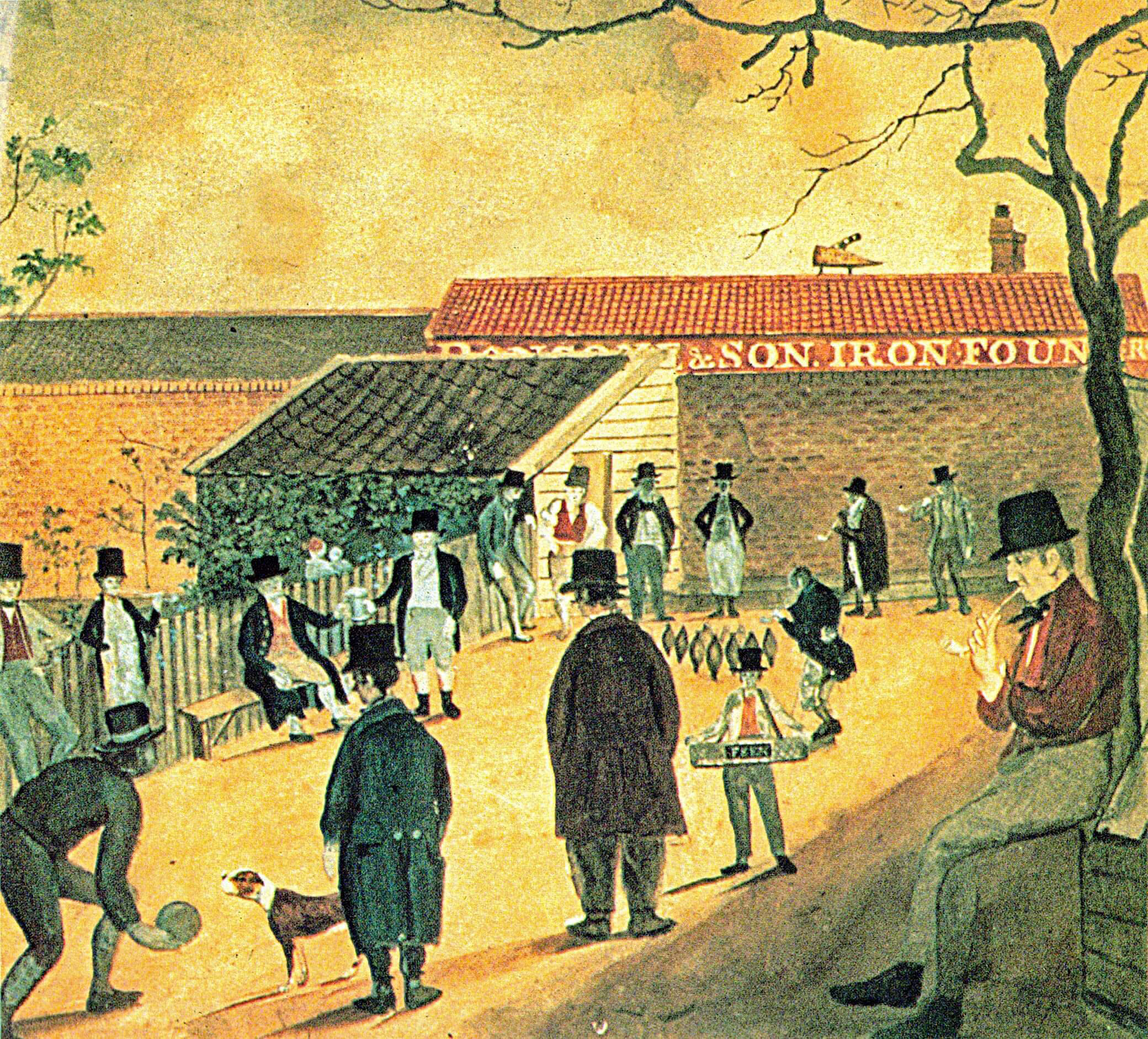
A circa-1810 Ipswich painting of outdoor tenpin bowling

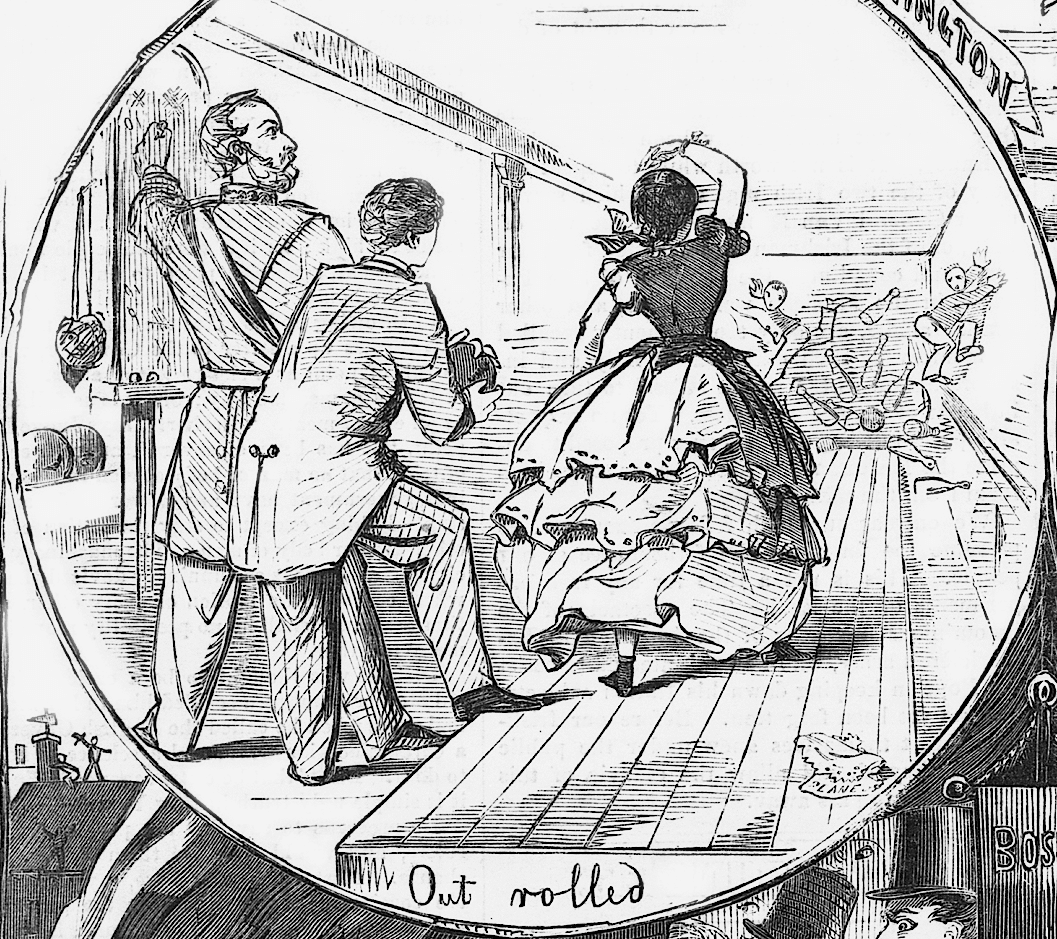
Tongue-in-cheek illustration of a bowling alley from an 1860 Harpers Weekly cover

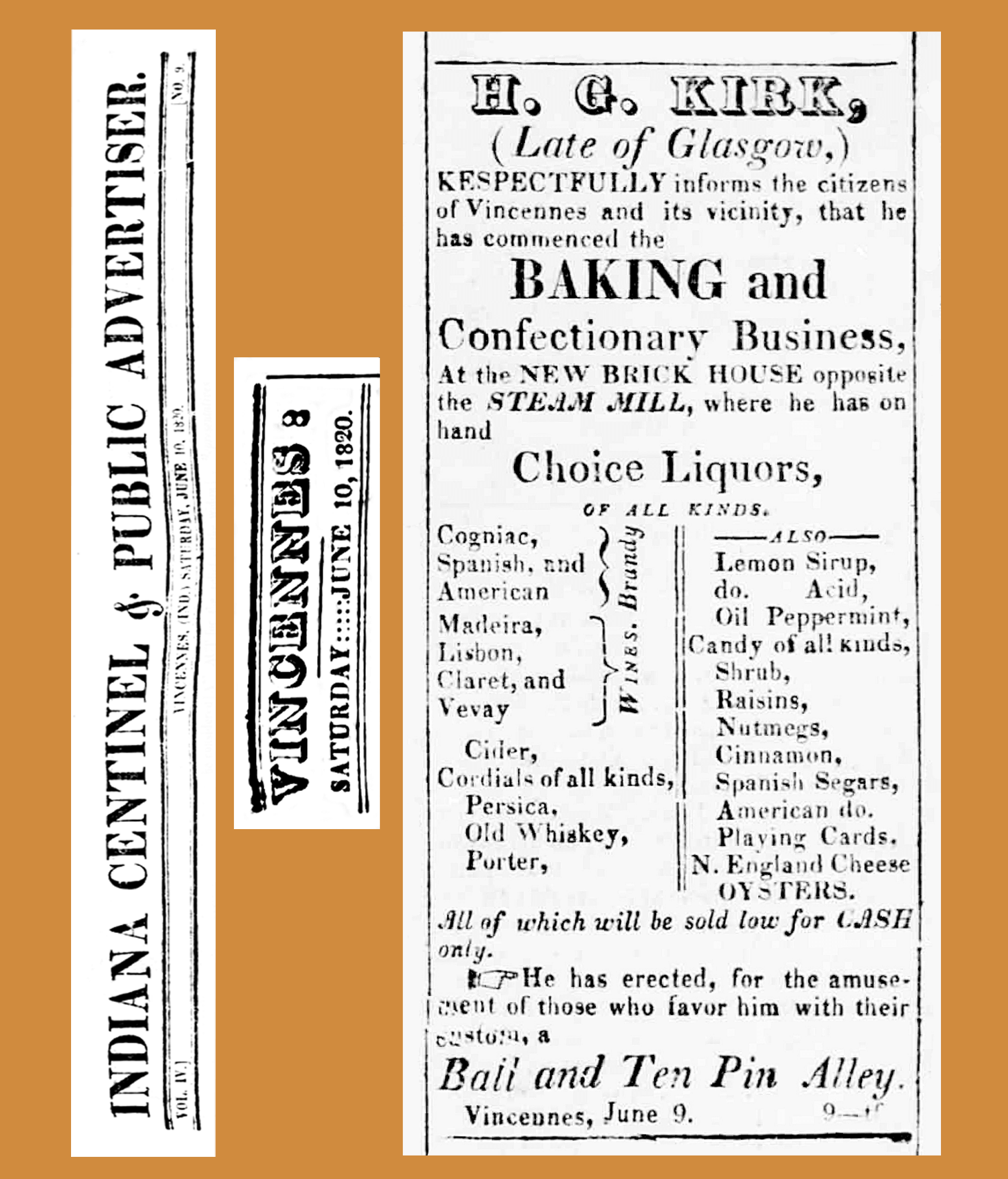
1820 Indiana newspaper ad mentioning a "Ball and Ten Pin Alley" to attract customers to a bakery

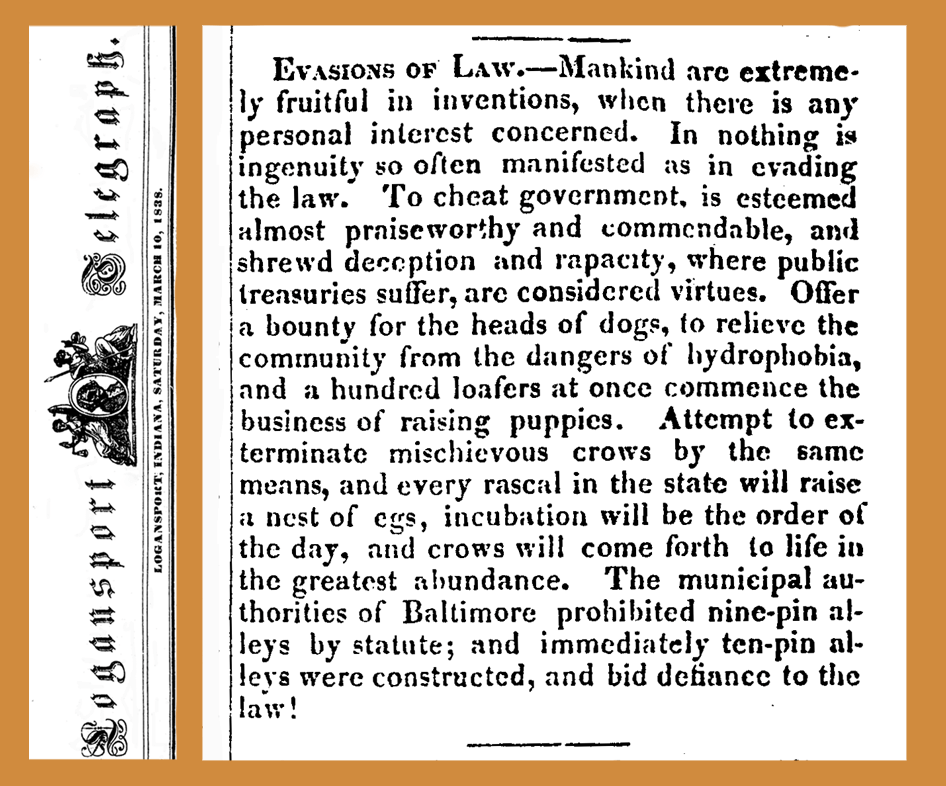
An 1838 Indiana newspaper describes how tenpin bowling alleys were constructed to evade a Baltimore statute prohibiting nine-pin bowling.

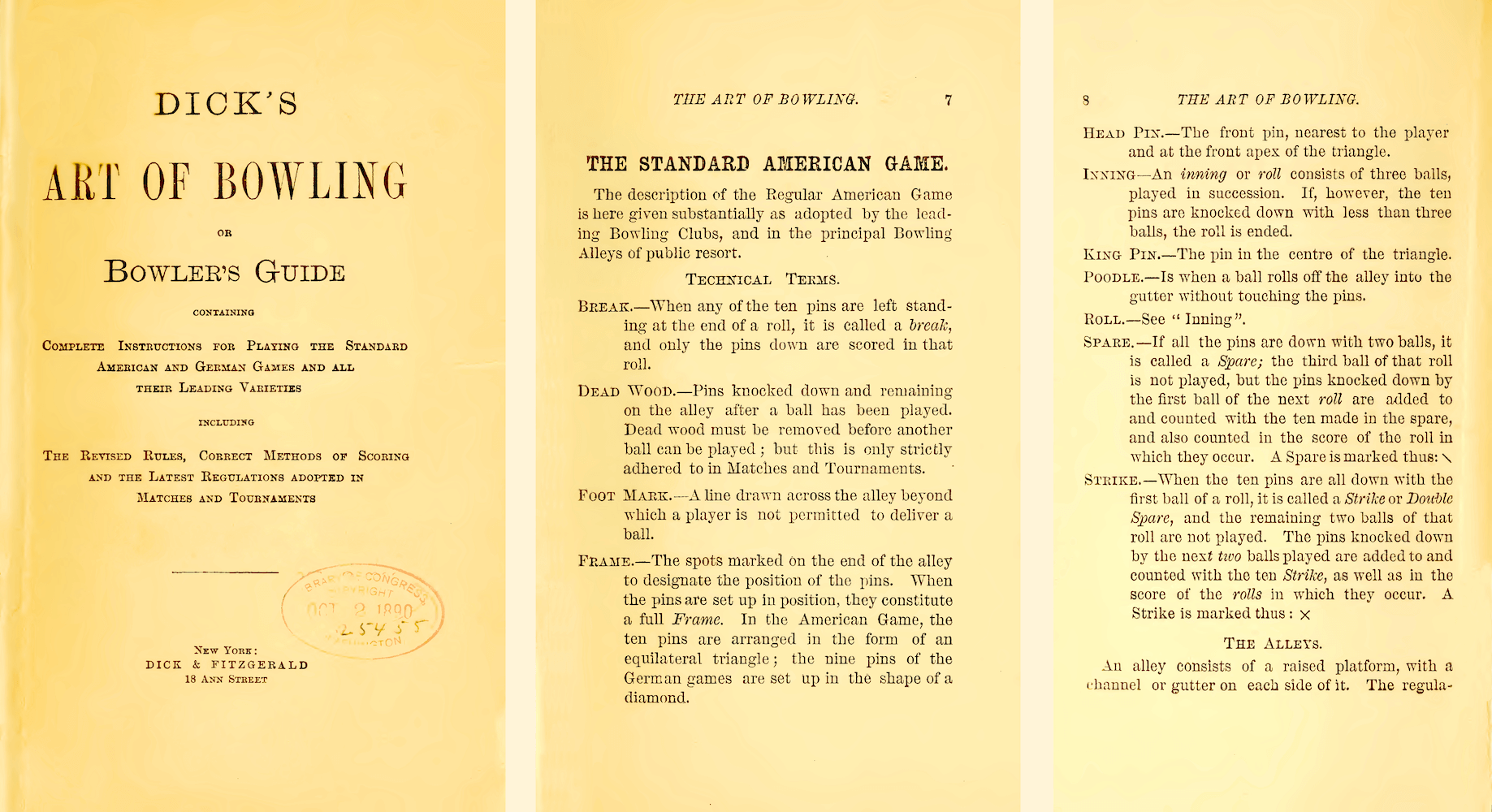
An 1890 Bowler's Guide describes how "innings" or "rolls" (frames) used up to three balls.

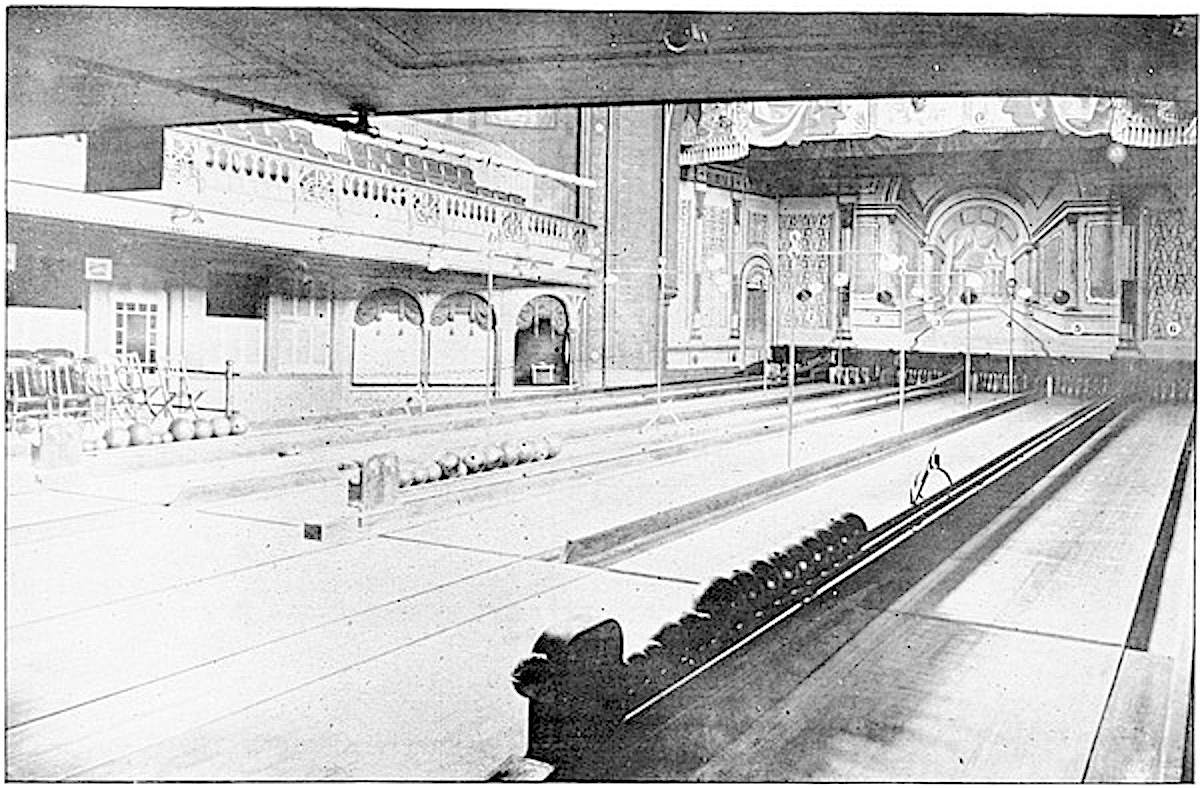
Palace Bowling Alleys in the Pawtucket, Rhode Island Music Hall c. 1895, with different-sized balls

A painting of Ipswich, England c. 1810 shows a man bowling with a triangular formation of ten pins before that variant of the sport is believed to have appeared in the United States. An 1828 auction notice in Ipswich cites "ten-pin and skittle grounds".

Washington Irving mentioned ninepin bowling for the first time in American literature in his 1819 story, "Rip Van Winkle". Newspaper articles and advertisements at least as early as 1820 refer to "ten pin alleys", usually as a side attraction of a business or property. By the late 1830s, New York's Knickerbocker Hotel housed a three-lane bowling alley. The oldest surviving bowling lanes in the United States were built in 1846 as part of Roseland Cottage, the summer estate of Henry Chandler Bowen (1831–1896) in Woodstock, Connecticut. The lanes, now part of Historic New England's Roseland Cottage House Museum, have Gothic Revival architectural elements compatible with the estate. The Scottish Bowling Association for lawn bowling was founded in Scotland by 200 clubs in 1848; it was dissolved and revived in 1892. Glasgow cotton merchant William Wallace Mitchell (1803–1884) published Manual of Bowls Playing in 1864, which became a standard reference for lawn bowling in Scotland. The National Bowling Association (NBA) was founded in 1859 by 27 New York City clubs to standardize rules for tenpin bowling, setting the ball size and the distance between the foul line and the pins but failing to agree on other rules; it was superseded in 1895 by the American Bowling Congress. Candlepin bowling was invented in 1880 by Justin White. Brunswick Corporation (founded in 1845) of Chicago, Illinois, a manufacturer of billiard tables, began making bowling balls, pins, and wooden lanes during the 1880s to sell to taverns installing bowling alleys. Duckpin bowling was invented in Boston during the early 1890s, spreading to Baltimore around 1899. Joe Thum—who became known as the "father of modern bowling"—began opening tenpin bowling alleys (including at 401 Greenwich Street in the Tribeca West Historic District) and strove to elevate the sport's image to compete with upper-class diversions such as theaters and opera houses.

Rules for tenpin bowling were established in New York City on 9 September 1895 by the American Bowling Congress (ABC) (later the United States Bowling Congress), who changed the scoring system from a maximum 200 points for 20 balls to a maximum 300 points for 12 balls and set the maximum ball weight at 16 lb (7.3 kg) and pin distance at 12 in (30 cm). The first ABC champion (1906–1921) was Jimmy Smith (1885–1948). Floretta "Doty" McCutcheon (1888–1967) defeated Smith in a 1927 exhibition match and founded a school that taught 500,000 women how to bowl. Women were allowed to join the ABC in 1993, and two years later the ABC merged with the Women's International Bowling Congress (WIBC) to become the United States Bowling Congress (USBC).

==== Early 20th century ====
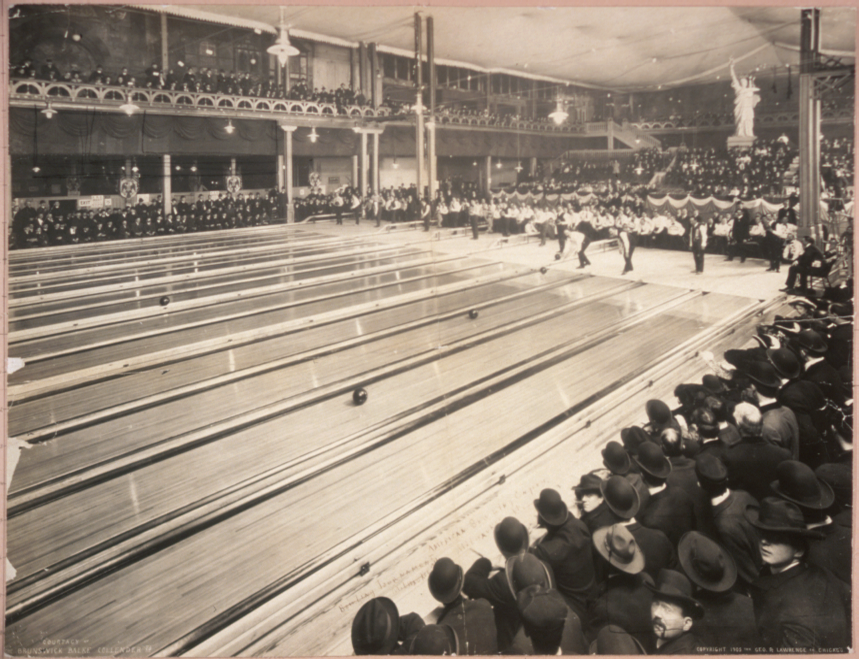
1905 ABC bowling tournament in Milwaukee

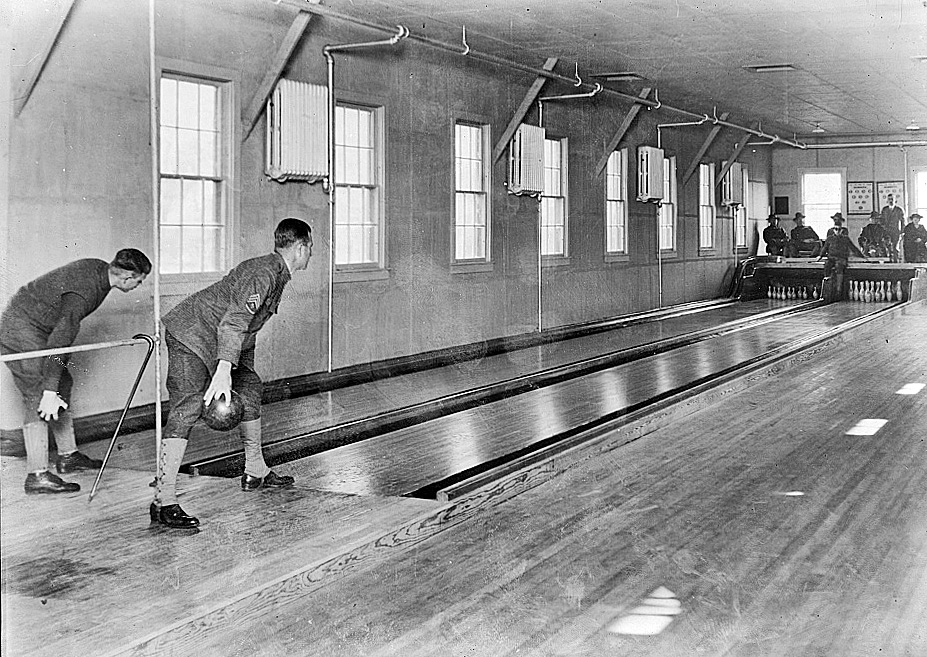
Side-by-side duckpin and tenpin bowling lanes c. 1919. A duckpin ball has no finger holes, and contemporary ten-pin balls had a thumb hole and one finger hole.

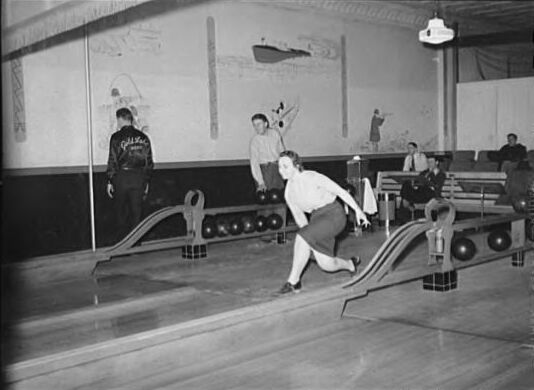
A bowling alley in February 1940

The English Bowling Association was founded in 1903 by cricketer W. G. Grace. On 1 January 2008, it merged with the English Women's Bowling Association to become Bowls England. In 1903, D. Peifer of Chicago developed a handicap method for bowling. Rubber duckpin bowling was invented two years later by Willam Wuerthele of Pittsburgh, and it caught on in Quebec.

The ABC initially used bowling balls made of lignum vitae hardwood from the Caribbean. These were eventually supplanted by the "Evertrue" rubber ball, and by the Brunswick "Mineralite" rubber ball in 1905. Columbia Industries, founded in 1960, was the first manufacturer to produce polyester resin ("plastic") in bowling balls. In 1980, urethane-shell bowling balls were introduced by Ebonite.

Rules for target bowling evolved separately in each country which adopted the predominantly-British game. In 1905, the International Bowling Board was formed. Its constitution adopted the rules of the Scottish Bowling Association, with variations allowed at the national level. The Victorian Ladies' Bowling Association, founded in Melbourne in September 1907, was the world's first women's lawn-bowling association. The oldest surviving tenpin bowling alley opened in 1908 in the basement of Milwaukee's Holler House tavern, with the country's oldest sanctioned lanes. Europe's first tenpin bowling alley was installed in Sweden the following year, but the game failed to catch on in the rest of the continent until after World War II. Tenpin bowling became popular in Great Britain after hundreds of bowling lanes were installed on U.S. military bases during World War II.

The monthly Bowlers Journal was founded in Chicago in 1913, and is still in existence. In late 1916, The Women's International Bowling Congress (originally the Woman's National Bowling Association) was founded in St. Louis in late 1916, and merged with the United States Bowling Congress in 2005. Prohibition in the U.S. forced bowling alleys to disassociate from saloons, turning bowling into a family game and encouraging female bowlers.

The annual Petersen Open Bowling Tournament (also known as the Pete), first held in Chicago on 2 October 1921, became bowling's richest tournament. In 1998, it was taken over by AMF. The International Bowling Association (IBA) was formed in 1926 by the United States, Sweden, Germany, the Netherlands, and Finland, and held four world championships by 1936. The National Bowling Association of America changed its name to the Bowling Writers Association of America in 1953, after being founded in Peoria, Illinois, by four bowling journalists on 21 March 1934.

In August 1939, the National Negro Bowling Association was founded in Detroit. Five years later it opened membership to all, and reached 30,000 members in 2007. The Bowling Proprietors Association of America (BPAA) held the first BPAA All-Star tournament in 1942. In 1947, the Australian Women's Bowling Council was founded. It held the first Australian women's national lawn-bowling championship in Sydney in 1949, won by R. Cranley of Queensland. The Professional Women Bowling Writers (PWBW) was founded in Dallas on 18 April 1948, and began admitting men in 1975. On 1 January 2007, it merged with the Bowling Writers Association of America.

==== Mid-20th century ====
Dick Weber in 1986

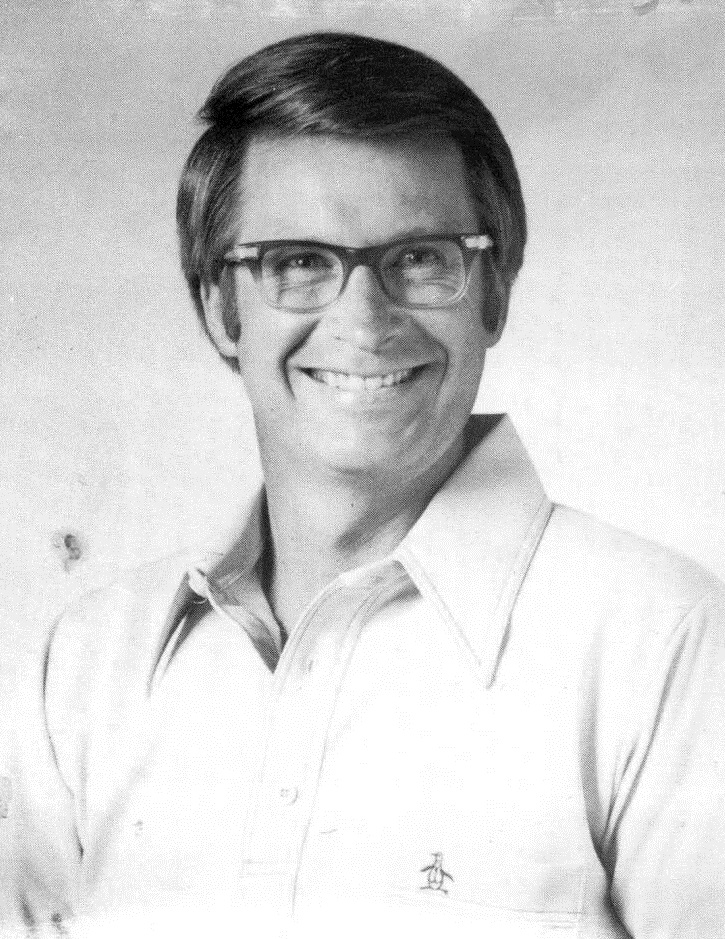
Earl Anthony in 1979

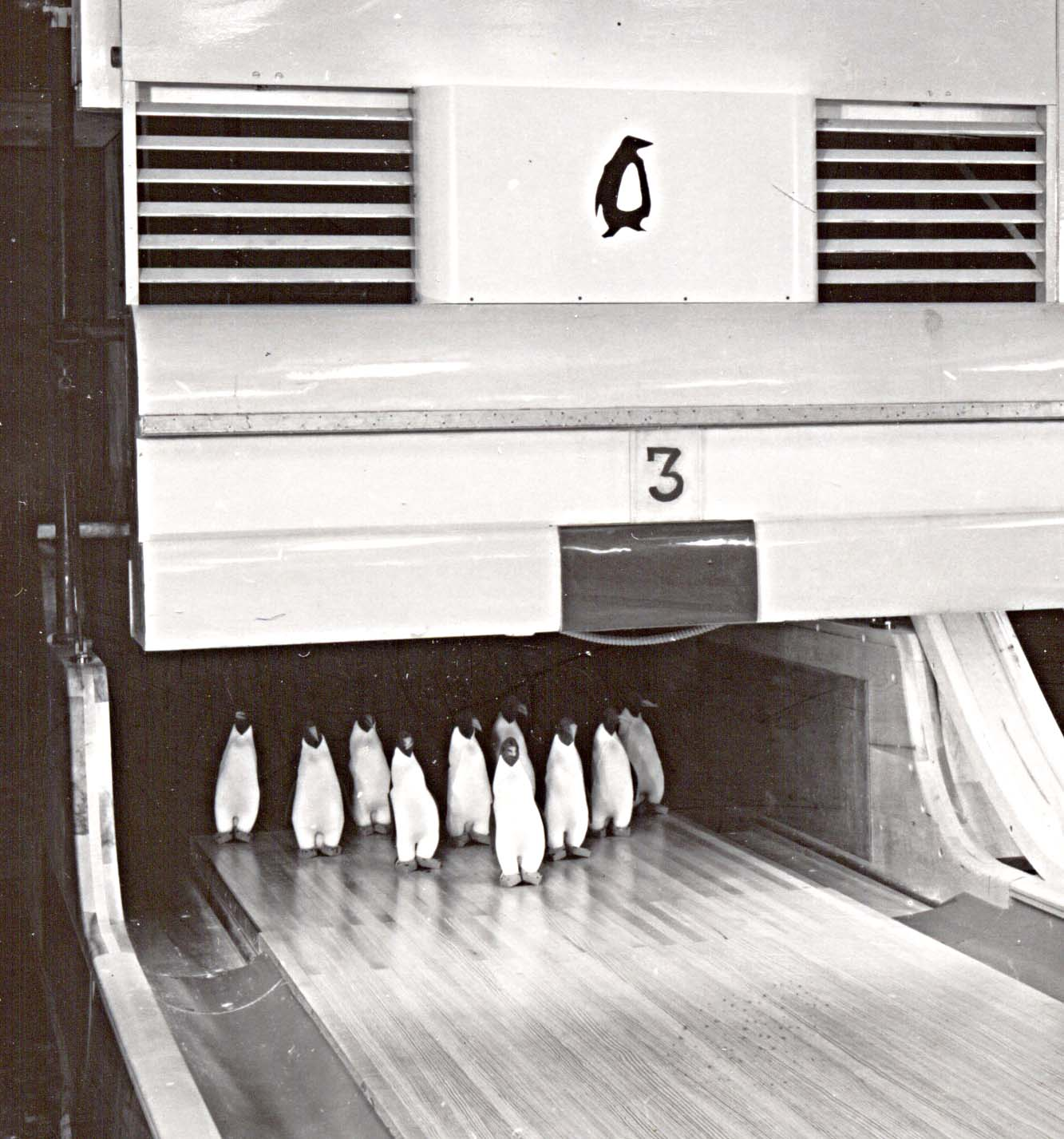
In 1961, Seabees constructed two lanes at McMurdo Station. Stuffed penguin "pins" were used for the inauguration.

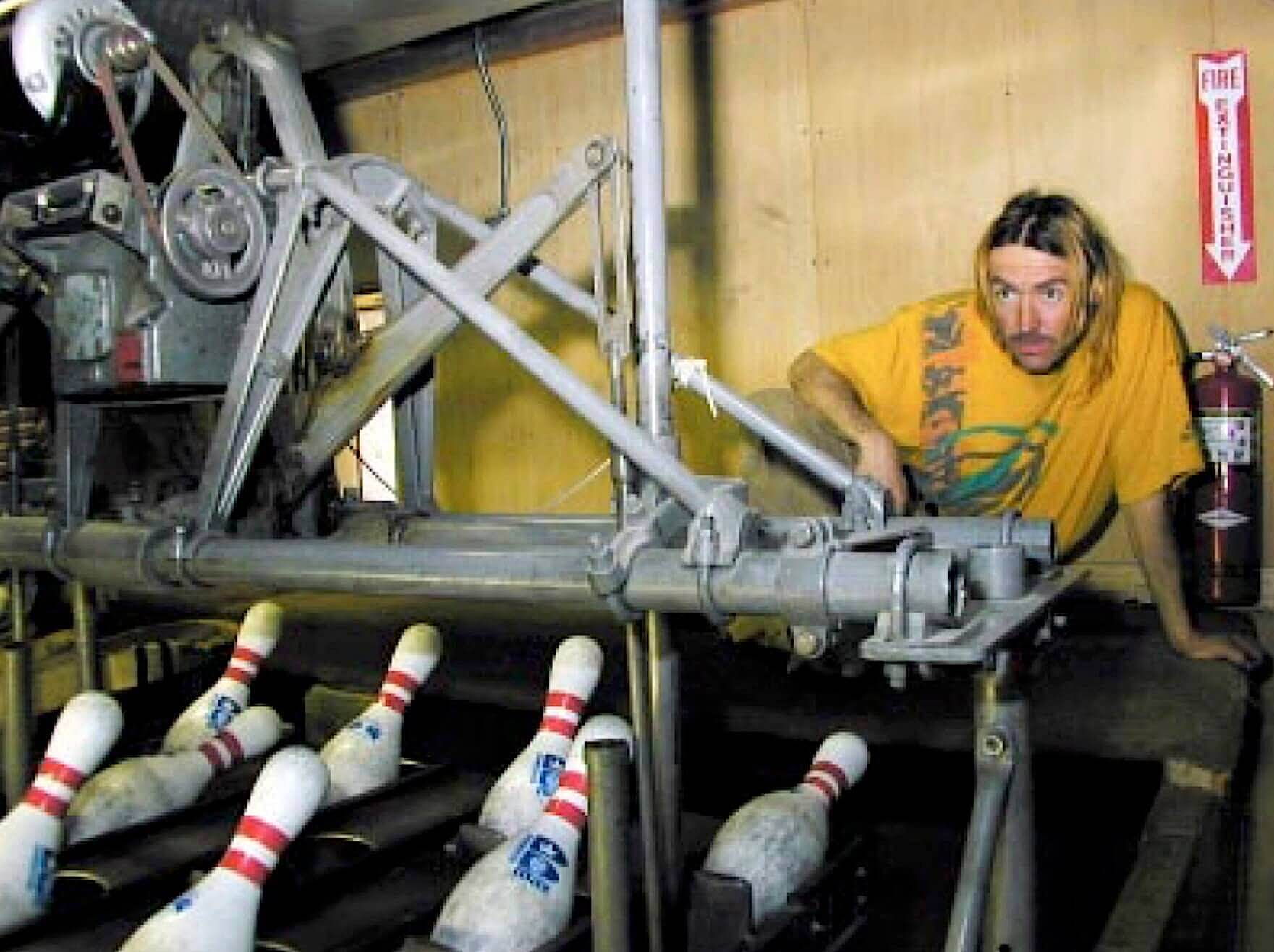
The McMurdo lanes, among few in the world with human pinsetters, were dismantled in 2009/2010 due to structural problems.

In 1950, after extensive lobbying by civil-rights groups in the wake of the 1947 integration of Major League Baseball, the American Bowling Congress opened its membership to African Americans and other minority groups. The WIBC followed suit the following year. Professional bowlers' salaries rivaled those of baseball, football, and hockey players until the late 1970s.

The first ABC Masters tournament was held in 1951, becoming one of the four majors by 2000. In 1952, the International Bowling Federation was founded in Hamburg to coordinate international amateur competition in nine- and tenpin bowling. Two years later, the first World Bowling Championships were held in Helsinki. In 1979, the International Olympic Committee recognized the organization as the world governing body for bowling.

American Machine and Foundry (AMF) of Brooklyn began marketing automatic pinsetter machines in 1952, eliminating the need for human pinsetters. On 4 October 1953, Grazio Castellano of Brooklyn was the first person to bowl a perfect game on television during an Eastern All-Star league session in Newark, New Jersey. In 1954, Steve Nagy was the first person to bowl a perfect 300 game on film.

The Professional Bowlers Association (PBA) was founded in Akron, Ohio in 1958 by 33 prominent bowlers (including Don Carter, Dick Weber, Dick Hoover, Buzz Fazio, Billy Welu, Carmen Salvino and Glenn Allison) after a presentation by sports agent Eddie Elias. The PBA eventually reached about 4,300 members in 14 countries. On 28 November 1960, the first PBA Championship in Memphis, Tennessee, was won by Don Carter. It was renamed the PBA World Championship in 2002, and awards the Earl Anthony Trophy to the winner. Earl Anthony was the first PBA member to earn $100,000 in 1975, and the first to earn $1,000,000 by 1982. The PBA was purchased in 2000 by former Microsoft executives, who moved its headquarters to Seattle.

The Professional Women's Bowling Association (PWBA) was founded in 1960, and ceased operations in 2003. The National Bowling League (NBL) was founded to compete with the PBA. It attracted players such as Billy Welu and Buzz Fazio, but was unable to sign Don Carter. The league's failure to get a TV contract caused it to fold after its first championship in 1962. The British Tenpin Bowling Association (BTBA) was formed on 26 May 1961.

On 27 January 1962, ABC Television aired its first Saturday-afternoon broadcast of a PBA Tour event: the Empire State Open at Redwood Lanes in Albany, New York; the partnership between ABC and the PBA lasted through 1997. The first PBA Tournament of Champions was held that year; it became an annual event in 1965, and was sponsored by Firestone Tire from 1965 through 1993. The American Wheelchair Bowling Association (AWBA) was founded in Louisville, Kentucky, by Richard F. Carlson.

On 28 June 1963, the first British-made tenpin was made by H. Massil and Sons, who received permit number 1 from the British Tenpin Bowling Association (BTBA). The fifth World Bowling Championships were held from 3 to 10 November 1963 in Mexico City, attended by 132 men and 45 women from 19 nations. Team USA debuted, winning seven of the eight gold medals. On 25 November 1963, a Sports Illustrated article entitled "A Guy Named Smith Is Striking It Rich" reported that PBA stars earned more money than other professional sports stars; "with more than $1 million in prizes to shoot for, the nation's top professional bowlers are rolling in money." The number of bowling alleys in the U.S. increased from 65,000 in 1957 to 160,000 in 1962, but the U.S. bowling boom ended in 1963. This was compensated for by a boom in Europe and Japan, making tenpin bowling an international sport.

In 1964, Don Carter was the first athlete to sign a $1 million endorsement contract: a multi-year deal with Ebonite International. Marion Ladewig, a nine-time winner of the Bowling Writers Association of America's Female Bowler of the Year Award, became the first Superior Performance inductee into the WIBC Hall of Fame that year. The following year, the AMF Bowling World Cup was established. On 27 January 1967, the Japan Professional Bowling Association (JPBA) was founded in Tokyo.

The BPAA All-Star tournament was renamed the BPAA U.S. Open in 1971, and became a major PBA tournament. In 1978, National Negro Bowling Association pioneer J. Elmer Reed was the first African American to be inducted into the ABC Hall of Fame. Willie Willis won the Brunswick National Resident Pro Tournament in Charlotte, North Carolina on 16 December 1979, the first African-American bowling champion in the PBA in a non-touring event. He was the first African American in the Firestone Tournament of Champions the following year, placing 13th.

==== Late 20th century ====
Automatic lane-oiling machines can be programmed to apply different oil patterns. "Typical house shot" patterns enable higher scores than the more-challenging "sport shots".

Earl Anthony won the Toledo Trust PBA National Championship on 27 February 1982, the first bowler to reach $1 million in career earnings. That year, the Young American Bowling Alliance was formed from a merger of the American Junior Bowling Congress, the Youth Bowling Association, and the collegiate divisions of the ABC and WIBC. The 1982 Commonwealth Games in Brisbane added women's bowls to the events. On 1 July 1982, former PBA pro Glenn Allison rolled the first 900 series (three consecutive 300 games in a three-game set) to be submitted to the ABC for award consideration. The ABC refused to certify the score, however, citing non-compliant lane conditions.

George Branham III was the first African American to win a PBA national touring event: the Brunswick Memorial World Open in Chicago on 22 November 1986. On 18 September 1988, the 1988 Summer Olympics in Seoul included tenpin bowling as a demonstration sport. Tenpin bowling became an international medal-level sport for the first time at the Pan American Games in Havana on 2 August 1991. The ABC introduced resin bowling balls during the 1992–1993 season, increasing the number of 300 games by 20 percent. In 1995, the first Best Bowler ESPY Award was presented. That year, the National Bowling Stadium opened in Reno, Nevada.

On 2 February 1997, Jeremy Sonnenfeld bowled the first officially-sanctioned 900 series (three consecutive 300 games) at Sun Valley Lanes in Lincoln, Nebraska. The World Tenpin Masters bowling tournament was established the following year. The Weber Cup (named after Dick Weber) was established in 2000 as the tenpin-bowling equivalent of golf's Ryder Cup, with Team USA playing Team Europe in a three-day match.

==== 21st century ====
Zach Wilkins' two-handed delivery, popularized by Jason Belmonte in the 2000s

Kyle Troup's two-handed delivery, showing increased rev rate and resulting hook

The number of sanctioned 300 games per league bowler has increased substantially since the 1990s. Freeman and Hatfield posit that the increase in perfect games is due to the introduction of reactive resin coverstocks, asymmetric ball cores, synthetic lane surfaces, and precision lane-oiling machines.

In 2023, the USBC began certifying string pinsetters, which are being installed in a growing number of bowling centers because of their reduced cost and maintenance requirements.

On 31 March 2004, Missy Bellinder (later Parkin) was the first female member of the PBA. The PBA had opened up its membership to women after the 2003 demise of the PWBA. One year later, Liz Johnson was the first woman to make the televised final round of a PBA Tour event. In 2004, the Brunswick Euro Challenge was founded for amateur and pro tenpin bowlers from Europe, Asia, and the U.S. On 24 January 2010, Kelly Kulick was the first woman to win the PBA Tournament of Champions and the first woman to win a PBA national tour event.

In November 2012, after league bowling dropped from 80 percent to 20 percent of its business, AMF Bowling Centers filed for Chapter 11 bankruptcy protection for the second time (first in 2001). AMF merged the following year with upscale New York-based bowling-center operator Bowlmor (which did not support league bowling) in an attempt to turn league bowling around, growing from 276 centers in 2013 to 315 in 2015. The PBA League was founded in 2013, consisting of eight permanent five-person teams with an annual draft. In 2015, the Professional Women's Bowling Association (PWBA) was revived after a 12-year hiatus.

A study of professional and master tenpin bowlers found that average scores declined less than 10 percent from age 20 to age 70. This decline in a sport focusing on skill and technique is smaller than that of sports dominated by muscular strength, cardiovascular endurance or agility, which decrease about 10 percent per decade.

== Equipment ==
=== Ball ===
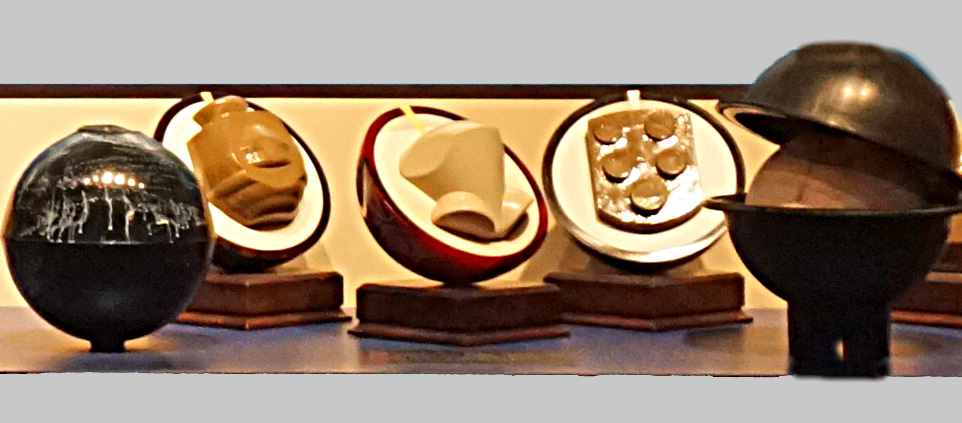
Bowling balls with exposed cores at the International Bowling Museum

Bowling balls vary by the type of bowling. Tenpin balls are about 8.59 inches (21.8 cm) in diameter, typically have three holes, and weigh from 6 to 16 lb (2.7 to 7.3 kg). The size and spacing of the finger holes on non-customized balls are generally smaller on lighter balls to accommodate smaller hands. Modern resin covers (surfaces, available since the early 1990s) enhance a ball's hook (curve) potential, and the shape of the balls' cores permits fine-tuning desired ball paths. Traditional plastic balls are suitable for straighter shots. Duckpin and candlepin balls fit in the palm, and have no holes.

=== Pins ===
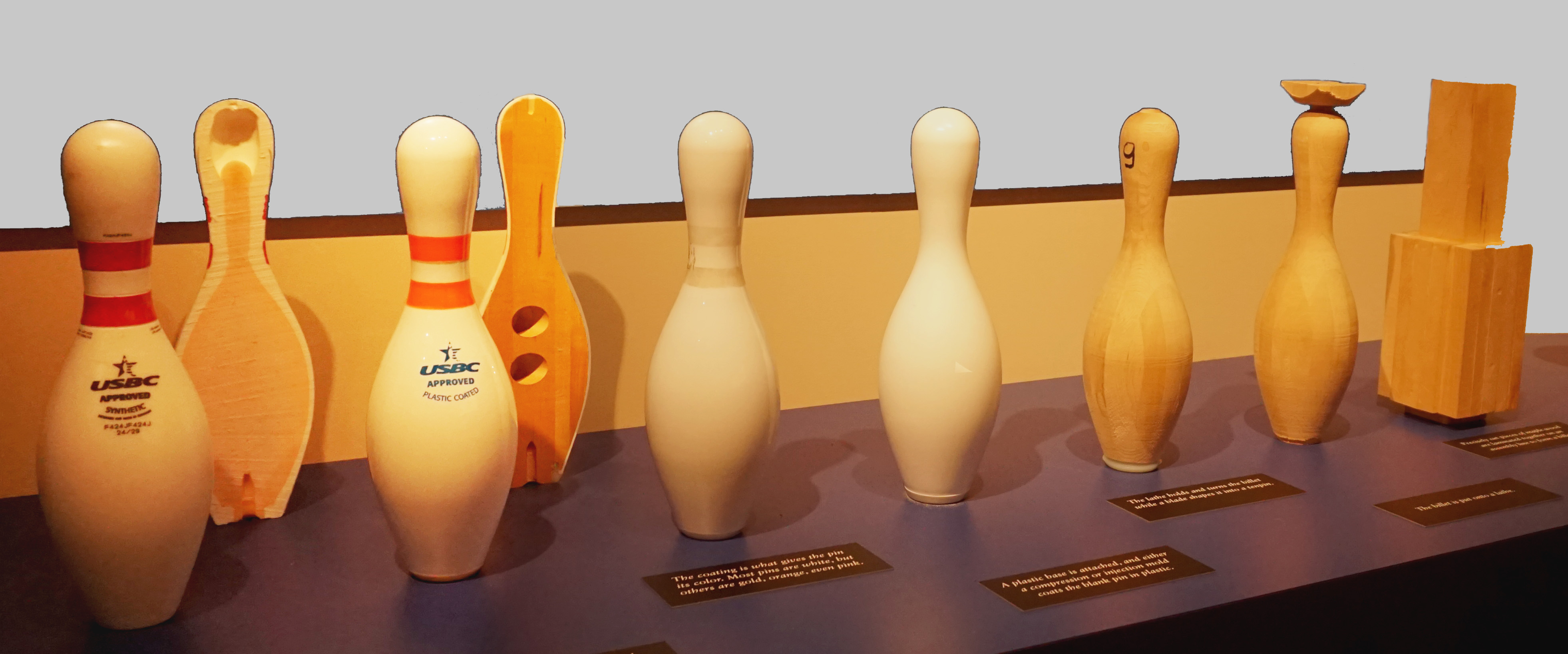
A tenpin bowling pin at various stages of manufacture

- External video
- YouTube short: String pinsetter operation

Bowling pins are the target of a bowling ball in pin bowling. The size and shape of pins vary, but are generally cylindrical and wider where the ball strikes the pin. Tenpin-bowling pins are the largest and heaviest, weighing 3 lb 6 oz (1.5 kg). Duckpins are shorter and squatter than standard tenpins; candlepins are the tallest at 15 3/4 in (40 cm), but are only 2 15/16 in (7.5 cm) wide and 2 lb 8 oz (1.1 kg) in weight.

Bowling pins are constructed by gluing blocks of maple into the approximate shape, and turning them on a lathe. After the lathe shapes the pin, it is coated with plastic, painted, and covered with a glossy finish. Because of the scarcity of suitable wood, bowling pins can be made from approved synthetics. Sanctioned synthetic pins exist for five-pin, duckpin, and candlepin bowling, and one synthetic tenpin model is approved by the USBC. When hit by the ball, synthetic pins usually sound different from wooden pins.

The USBC said that effective 1 August 2023, it would certify string pinsetters and string-pin bowling as a category of equipment and competition independent from conventional free-fall pinsetters. USBC lab data indicated that the strike percentage of string-pin bowling is 7.1 percent lower, and the organization planned additional testing to determine whether a scoring conversion should exist between the categories. String pinsetters are less expensive and easier to maintain, motivating bowling centers to phase them in.

=== Shoes ===
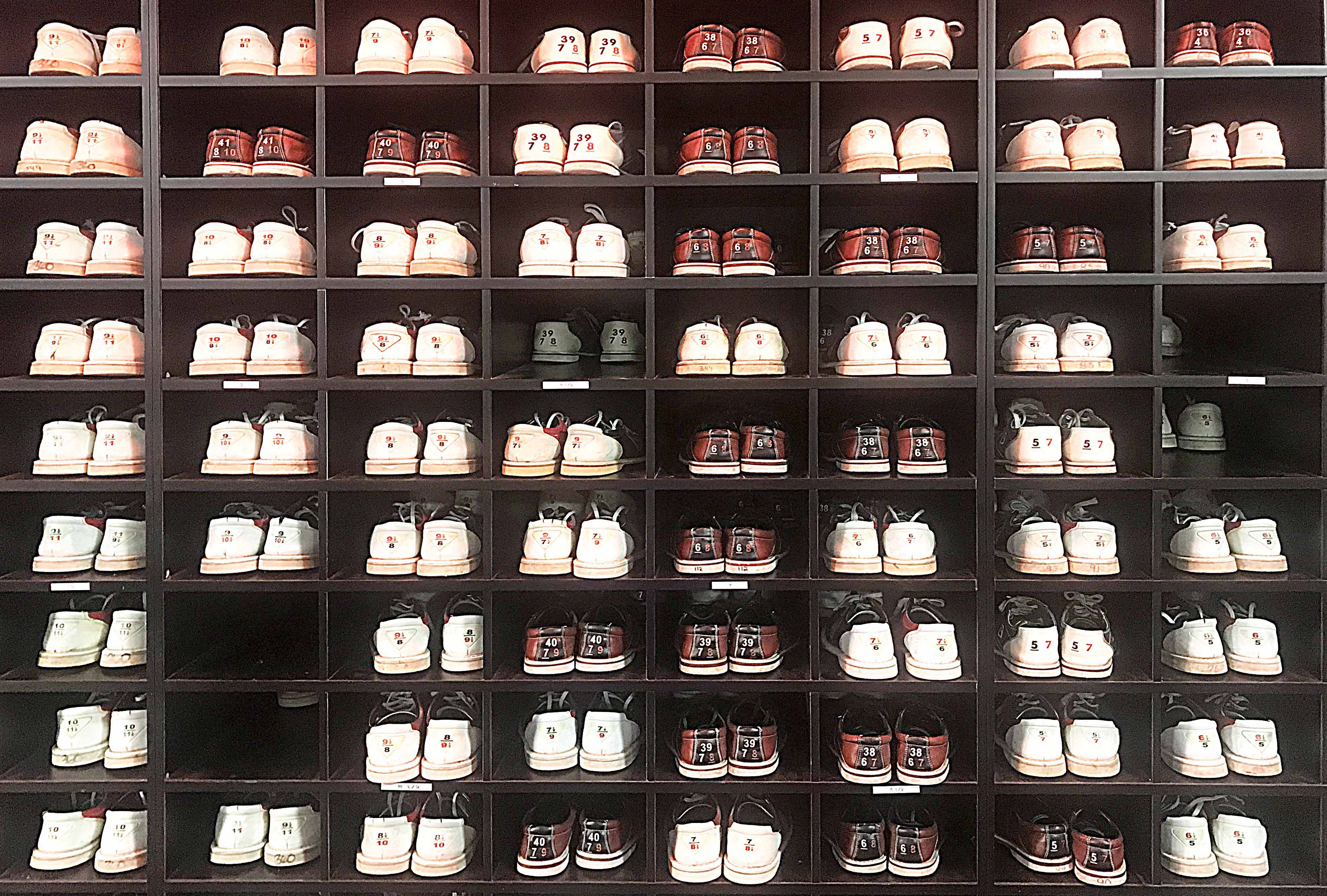
To prevent damage to lane approaches from street shoes, bowling centers provide special bowling shoes. Bowling shoes have soles that make it easier to slide on the approach.

The sole of the non-sliding shoe is generally made of rubber for traction; the sole of the sliding shoe is made of a smooth material, allowing a slide into the release. Bowling shoes may be purchased or rented from bowling centers. Wet or dirty soles may not slide properly, and could damage the approach surface.

== Scoring ==
A standard game of tenpin bowling consists of 10 frames, with a maximum of two rolls in each of the first nine frames and three in the tenth. For a strike, the bowler knocks down all 10 pins on the first roll; if this occurs in the first nine frames, the frame ends without a second roll. A spare occurs if the bowler leaves any pins standing after the first roll and knocks them all down on the second. In a frame, the bowler scores one point for every pin knocked down; a spare or strike awards one extra point for each pin knocked down on the next one or two rolls, respectively. In the tenth frame, the bowler receives one extra roll for making a spare and two for a strike. The highest possible score for a game is 300, achieved by rolling 12 consecutive strikes (a perfect game).

== Accessibility ==
Technological innovation has made bowling accessible to members of the disabled community. The IKAN Bowler, a device designed by quadriplegic engineer Bill Miller, attaches to a wheelchair and allows the user to control the speed, direction, and timing of the tenpin bowling ball's release. Its name comes from the Greek word ikano, which means "capable" or "enabled". For bowls, the sport has introduced a number of innovations to enable people with a disability to participate at all levels of the sport from social to Olympic-standard:

- Bowling arms and lifters enable bowlers to deliver a ball, minimizing the amount of movement required
- Wheelchair and green manufacturers have produced modified wheel tires and ramps to enable wheelchair athletes to access bowl greens
- Modified conditions of play, as outlined in disability classification in lawn bowls

== In popular culture ==
=== U.S. presidents ===
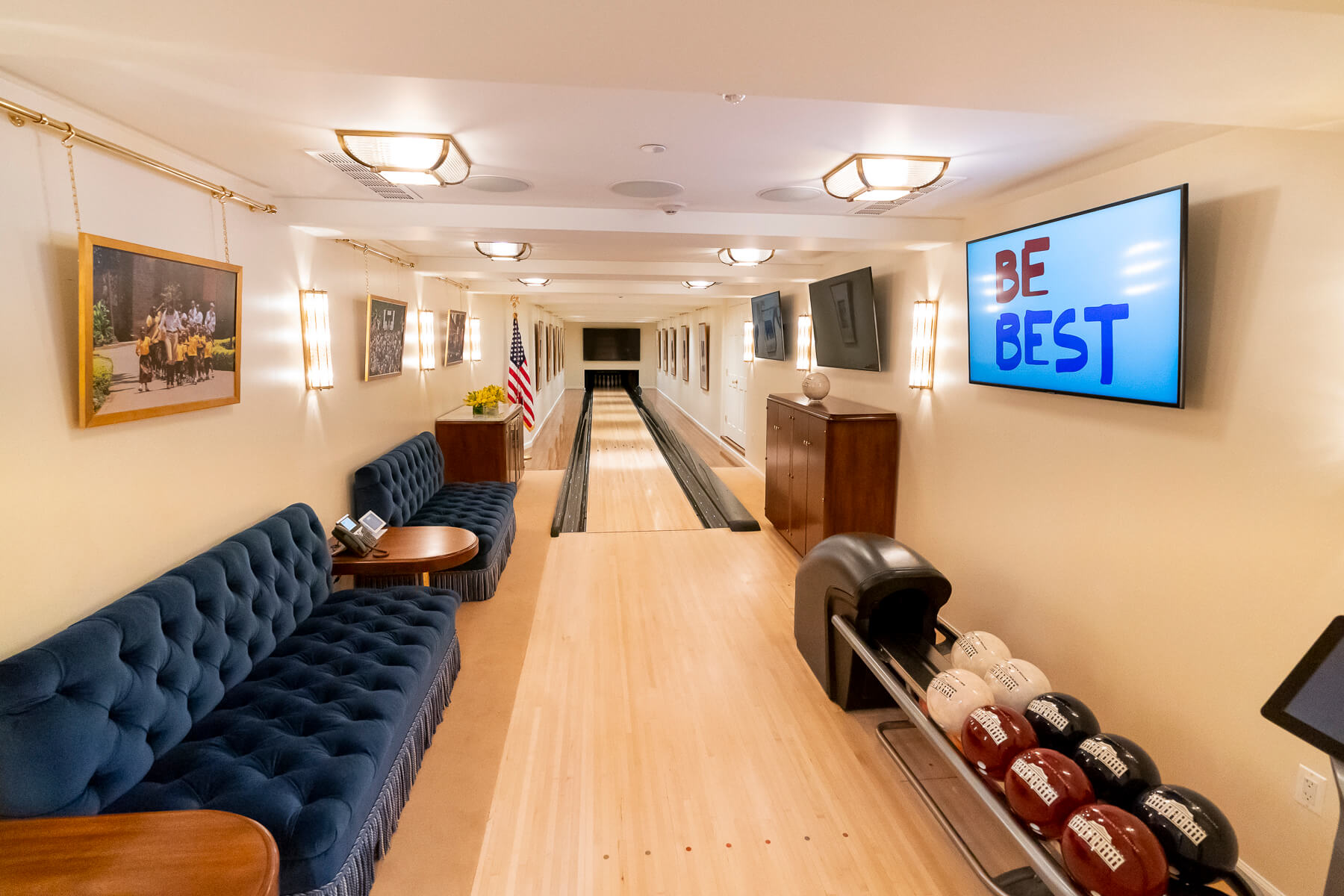
Single bowling lane under the White House's north portico after renovation, 2019

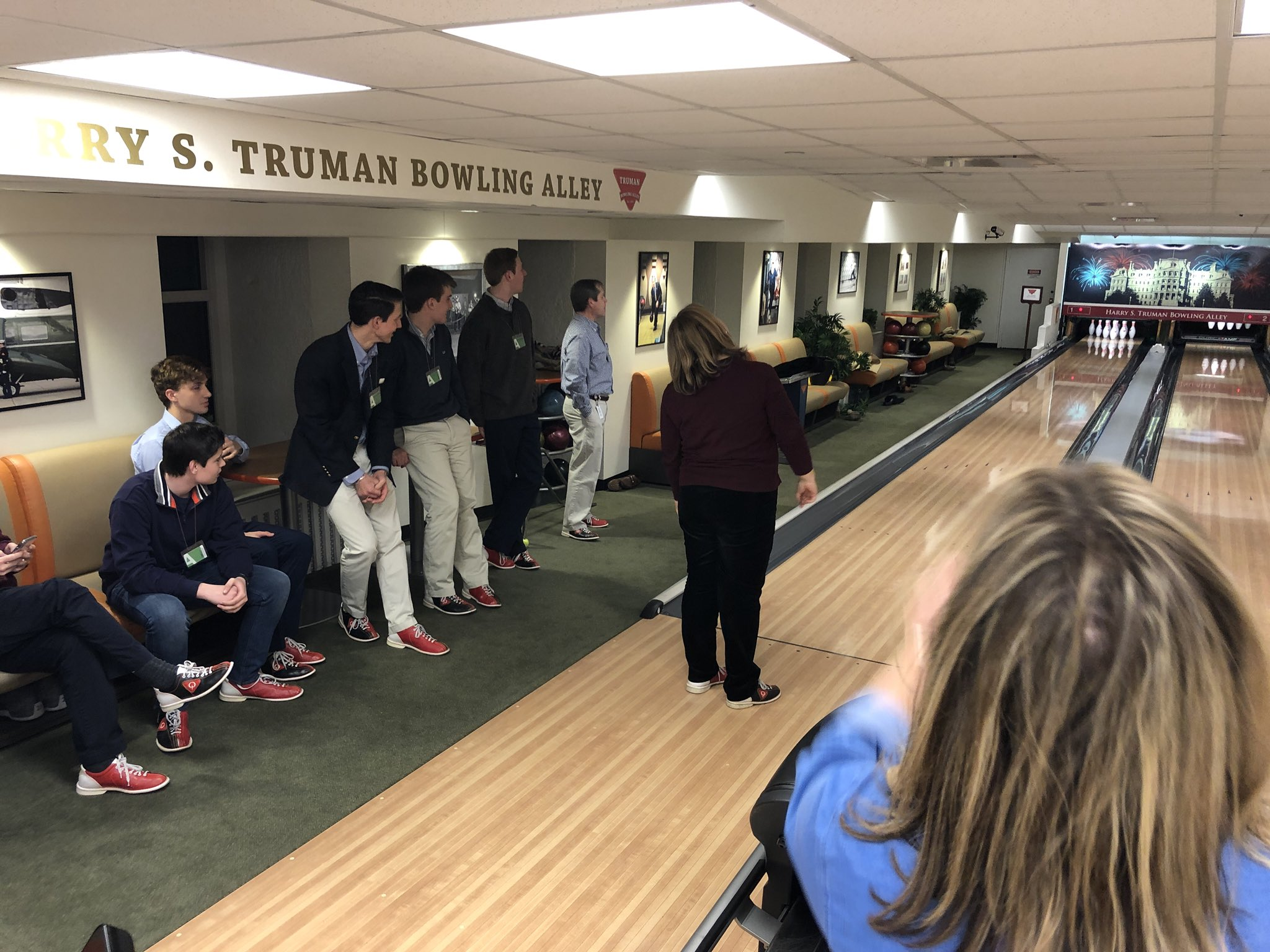
Two-lane Truman Bowling Alley in the Eisenhower Executive Office Building, 2018

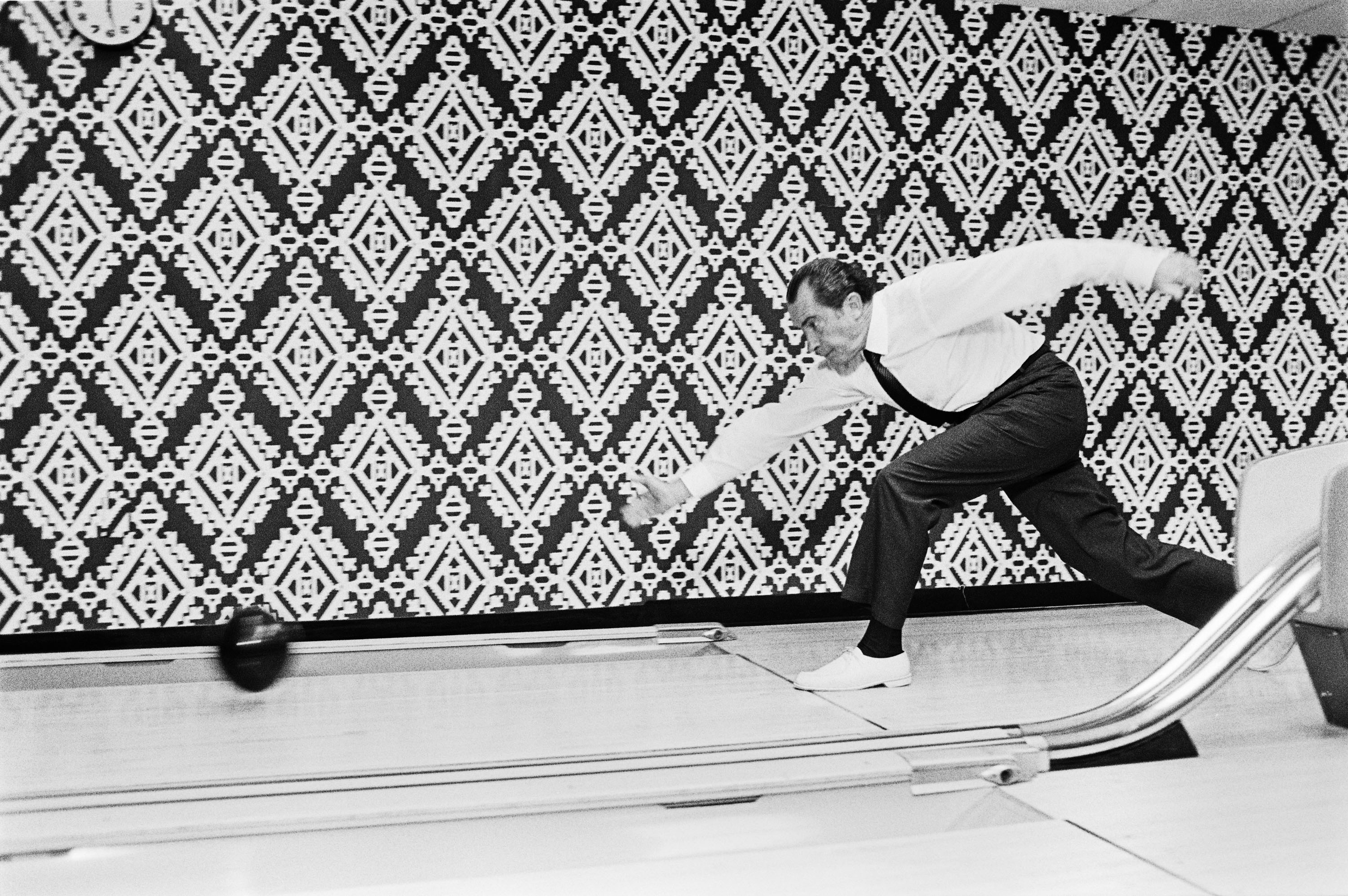
Richard Nixon bowling in 1971 in what was called the Old Executive Office Building (now called the Eisenhower Executive Office Building)

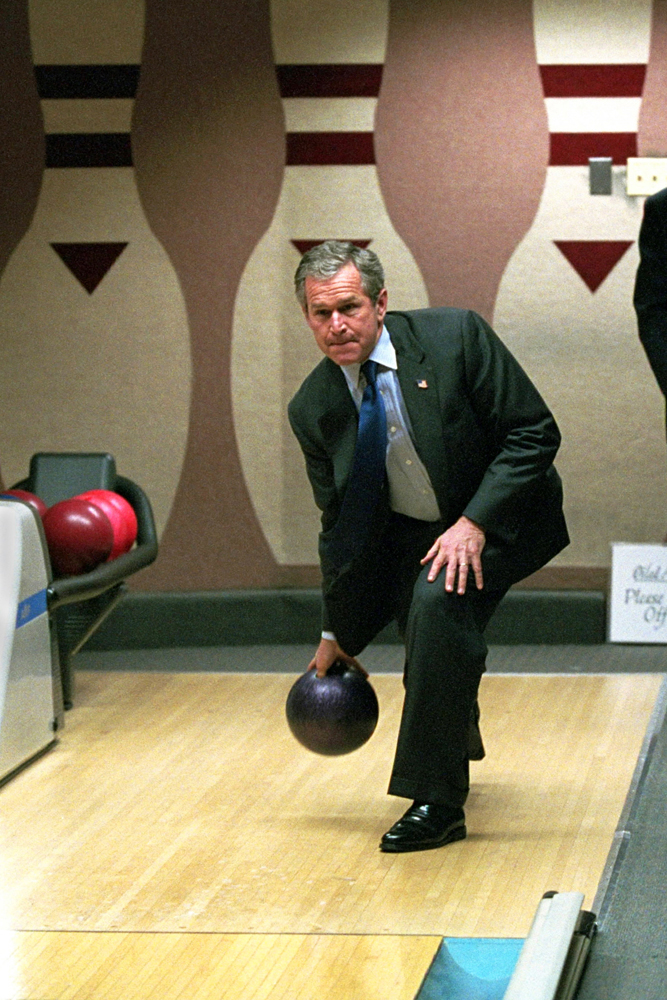
George W. Bush bowling at the White House, 2001

When Abraham Lincoln served a term in the U.S. House of Representatives from 1847 to 1849, he lived near a bowling alley. "He was 'very fond of bowling' ... Though 'a very awkward bowler,' he nevertheless 'played the game with great zest and spirit, solely for exercise and amusement'". "He took victory and defeat 'with like good nature and humor, and left the alley at the conclusion of the game without a sorrow or disappointment'".

In 1948, two bowling lanes were installed on the ground floor of the West Wing of the White House as a birthday gift for President Harry S. Truman. The lanes were moved to the Old Executive Office Building (now the Eisenhower Executive Office Building) in 1955 for the benefit of White House employees; its old location became a mimeograph room and, in 1961, the Situation Room. On 9 July 2014, the General Services Administration published and quickly withdrew a solicitation for bids to replace the Truman bowling lanes, which were deemed "irreparable" for not having had "any professional, industry standard maintenance, modifications, repairs or attention" for fifteen years. A $253,000 contract was awarded for "routine repairs" in 2026.

Friends of President Richard Nixon, said to be an avid bowler, had a one-lane alley built in an underground space below the building's North Portico in 1969. The one-lane bowling alley underwent major renovations in 1994 and 2019.

=== Paintings ===
A c. 1810 painting shows bowlers in Ipswich playing the sport outdoors in the earliest known depiction of tenpin bowling, before tenpin bowling was documented in the United States. On 28 January 1950, Bowling Strike by George Hughes appeared on the cover of The Saturday Evening Post. In 1982, American expressionist painter LeRoy Neiman produced a painting of Earl Anthony's million-dollar strike.

=== Informal use ===
Children afraid of thunderstorms are told that thunder is God bowling.

== See also ==
- Automatic scorer
- Bowling Alone (2000) argues that the decline in league bowling exemplifies a decline in social participation.
- Frames per stop
- Glossary of bowling
- International Bowling Federation, the world governing body of bowling
- Irish road bowling along country roads, without a target
- New Zealand Indoor Bowls
- Open bowling
