= Open bowling =

Open bowling is a term used by bowlers and bowling establishments to describe non-sanctioned play. Open bowling has numerous purposes, including competition, practice, and recreation.
