= Floretta McCutcheon =

American bowler (1888–1967)

Personal information
- Born: July 22, 1888 Ottumwa, Iowa, US
- Died: February 2, 1967 (aged 78) Pasadena, California, US

Sport
- Sport: bowling

Floretta "Doty" McCutcheon (July 22, 1888 – February 2, 1967) was a professional bowler and activist. She is widely regarded for her professional achievements as well as work in popularizing bowling among women.

In her early years, McCutcheon competed on the local women's volleyball team at her YWCA. McCutcheon originally started bowling because she was advised to be more physically active by her doctor. Eventually, she married bowling enthusiast Robert McCutcheon. It was not until 1923 that she bowled her first game. In 1923, her husband formed a bowling league and added her to the roster without her permission. Her technique was originally to throw the bowling ball as far as she possibly could. Eventually this changed in 1926 as she focused specifically on controlling her delivery. In 1927, she challenged world champion, Jimmy Smith to a three-game set and beat him 704 to 696. A year later she became employed by the Brunswick Corporation, as an instructor.

== Bowling schools ==
McCutcheon was inspired to open bowling schools, which was an idea stemmed from popular cooking schools in the era. 1931 marked the opening of the first McCutcheon School of Bowling. That same year, almost 3,500 women attended. Focused on popularizing the sport among women, at one point she was the only instructor focusing on teaching women specifically. Ultimately, during her career as an instructor, she taught over 300,000 women.

== Legacy ==
She appears as a contestant on the 20th January 1955 edition of You Bet Your Life where she states that people call her "Mac" and that she had rolled ten perfect scores. She gets through to the jackpot question but cannot name 'the sweetheart of Hiawatha'.

In 1956, she was inducted to the Bowling Hall of Fame and in 1973, the Colorado Sports Hall of Fame. McCutcheon decided to write her own bowling booklets and then proceeded to create her own organized bowling leagues. After a long career, McCutcheon decided to retire in South Pasadena, California. McCutcheon was inducted into the Iowa Sports Hall of Fame in 1988.
