= Bowling at the Pan American Games =

- No. of events: 4 (men: 2; women: 2)

Bowling, primarily in the form of the tenpin sport, as regulated by the World Bowling organization (the Pan American Games' tenpin events are governed by World Bowling's PABCON American Zone division), has been a sport at the Pan American Games since the 1991 Pan American Games.

== Medal table ==
As of 2023 Pan American Games

Rank	Nation	Gold	Silver	Bronze	Total
1	United States	26	7	9	42
2	Colombia	5	5	8	18
3	Canada	4	5	6	15
4	Mexico	3	7	10	20
5	Brazil	1	2	1	4
6	Panama	1	0	0	1
7	Venezuela	0	10	5	15
8	Dominican Republic	0	1	4	5
9	Puerto Rico	0	1	2	3
10	Guatemala	0	1	0	1
10	Netherlands Antilles	0	1	0	1
12	Costa Rica	0	0	2	2
13	Argentina	0	0	1	1
Totals (13 entries)		40	40	48	128

- Discontinued team

== Men ==
=== Singles ===
Games	Gold	Silver	Bronze
1991 Havana	Patrick Healey Jr. United States	Luis Serfaty; Venezuela	Jon Juneau; United States
1995 Mar del Plata	Bill Rowe; Canada	Patrick Healey Jr. United States	Marco Zepeda; Mexico
1999 Winnipeg	David Romero; Colombia	Michael Mullin; United States	Marc Doi; Canada
2003 Santo Domingo	Daniel Falconi; Mexico	Marcos Baeza; Mexico	Bill Hoffman; United States
2007 Rio de Janeiro	Rhino Page; United States	Daniel Falconi; Mexico	Lucas Legnani; Argentina
2011 Guadalajara	Santiago Mejía; Colombia	Chris Barnes; United States	Marcelo Suartz; Brazil
2011 Guadalajara	Santiago Mejía; Colombia	Chris Barnes; United States	Manuel Fernandez; Dominican Republic
2015 Toronto	Marcelo Suartz; Brazil	Amleto Monacelli; Venezuela	Dan MacLelland; Canada
2015 Toronto	Marcelo Suartz; Brazil	Amleto Monacelli; Venezuela	Devin Bidwell; United States
2019 Lima	Nicholas Pate; United States	Marcelo Suartz; Brazil	Jakob Butturff; United States
2019 Lima	Nicholas Pate; United States	Marcelo Suartz; Brazil	Jean Perez; Puerto Rico
2023 Santiago	A. J. Johnson; United States	Mitch Hupé; Canada	Marco Moretti; Costa Rica
2023 Santiago	A. J. Johnson; United States	Mitch Hupé; Canada	Cristian Azcona; Puerto Rico

=== Doubles ===
Games	Gold	Silver	Bronze
1995 Mar del Plata	Patrick Healey Jr. and Chris Barnes; United States	Samir Daou and Carlos Finx, Jr. Netherlands Antilles	Mark Doi and Bill Rowe; Canada
1999 Winnipeg	not included in the Pan American Games program		
2003 Santo Domingo	Bill Hoffman and Scott Pohl; United States	George Lambert IV and Danyck Briere; Canada	Andrés Gómez and David Romero; Colombia
2007 Rio de Janeiro	Cassidy Schaub and Rhino Page; United States	Fabio Rezende and Rodrigo Hermes; Brazil	Victor Richards and Rolando Sebelen; Dominican Republic
2011 Guadalajara	Chris Barnes and Bill O'Neill; United States	José Lander and Amleto Monacelli; Venezuela	Andrés Gómez and Santiago Mejía; Colombia
2015 Toronto	Dan MacLelland and François Lavoie; Canada	Jaime González and Manuel Otalora; Colombia	Devin Bidwell and Tommy Jones; United States
2019 Lima	Jakob Butturff and Nicholas Pate; United States	Manuel Otalora and Alfredo Quintana; Colombia	José Llergo and Alturo Quintero; Mexico
2023 Santiago	Donald Lee and William Duen; Panama	Mitch Hupé and François Lavoie; Canada	Juan Rodríguez and Marco Moretti; Costa Rica

== Women ==
=== Singles ===
Games	Gold	Silver	Bronze
1991 Havana	Edda Piccini; Mexico	Julie Gardner; United States	Mandy Wilson; United States
1995 Mar del Plata	Catharine Willis; Canada	Mariela Alarza; Venezuela	Lisa Bishop; United States
1999 Winnipeg	Janette Piesczynski; United States	Alicia Marcano; Venezuela	Jennifer Willis; Canada
2003 Santo Domingo	Shannon Pluhowsky; United States	Sofia Granda; Guatemala	Clara Guerrero; Colombia
2007 Rio de Janeiro	Tennelle Milligan; United States	Alicia Marcano; Venezuela	Aumi Guerra; Dominican Republic
2011 Guadalajara	Liz Johnson; United States	Jennifer Park; Canada	Caroline Lagrange; Canada
2011 Guadalajara	Liz Johnson; United States	Jennifer Park; Canada	Karen Marcano; Venezuela
2015 Toronto	Shannon Pluhowsky; United States	Aumi Guerra; Dominican Republic	Liz Johnson; United States
2015 Toronto	Shannon Pluhowsky; United States	Aumi Guerra; Dominican Republic	Rocio Restrepo; Colombia
2019 Lima	Clara Guerrero; Colombia	Miriam Zetter; Mexico	Iliana Lomelí; Mexico
2019 Lima	Clara Guerrero; Colombia	Miriam Zetter; Mexico	María Rodríguez; Colombia
2023 Santiago	Clara Guerrero; Colombia	Juliana Franco; Colombia	Sandra Góngora; Mexico
2023 Santiago	Clara Guerrero; Colombia	Juliana Franco; Colombia	Breanna Clemmer; United States

=== Doubles ===
Games	Gold	Silver	Bronze
1995 Mar del Plata	Missy Howard and Lesia Stark; United States	Georgina Serratos and Gabriela Sandoval; Mexico	Margalit Mizrachi and Mariela Alarza; Venezuela
1999 Winnipeg	not included in the Pan American Games program		
2003 Santo Domingo	Adriana Pérez and Illiana Lomeli; Mexico	Shannon Pluhowsky and Stacy Werth; United States	Sara Vargas and Clara Guerrero; Colombia
2007 Rio de Janeiro	Diandra Asbaty and Tennelle Milligan; United States	Michelle Ayala and Yoselin Leon; Puerto Rico	Adriana Pérez and Sandra Góngora; Mexico
2011 Guadalajara	Liz Johnson and Kelly Kulick; United States	Sandra Góngora and Miriam Zetter; Mexico	Anggie Ramírez and María Rodríguez; Colombia
2015 Toronto	Clara Guerrero and Rocio Restrepo; Colombia	Liz Johnson and Shannon Pluhowsky; United States	Patricia de Faria and Karen Marcano; Venezuela
2019 Lima	Stefanie Johnson and Shannon O'Keefe; United States	Miriam Zetter and Iliana Lomelí; Mexico	Astrid Valiente and Aumi Guerra; Dominican Republic
2023 Santiago	Jordan Richard and Breanna Clemmer; United States	Juliana Franco and Clara Guerrero; Colombia	Sandra Góngora and Iliana Lomeli; Mexico

== Discontinued ==
=== Men's All-Events ===
Games	Gold	Silver	Bronze
1995 Mar del Plata	Patrick Healey Jr. United States	Pedro Carreyo; Venezuela	Agustin De Farias; Venezuela

=== Men's team ===
Games	Gold	Silver	Bronze
1991 Havana	United States; Steve Kloempken; Ralph Solan; Jon Juneau; Patrick Healey Jr.	Venezuela; Pedro Carreyo; Pedro Elias Cardozo; Luis Serfaty; Francisco Carabano	Mexico; Alfonso Rodriguez; Roberto Silva; Daniel Falconi; Luis Javier Iserte
1995 Mar del Plata	United States; Patrick Healey Jr. Mark Van Meter; John Eiss; Chris Barnes	Venezuela; Agustin De Farias; Pedro Avendano; Arturo Hernandez; Pedro Carreyo	Canada; Marc Doi; Doug Schatz; Paul Gyarmati; Bill Rowe
1999 Winnipeg	United States; John Gaines; John Eiss; Tony Manna, Jr. Michael Mullin	Canada; Mathieu Chouinard; Marc Doi; Jean Sebastian Lessard; Alan Tone	Mexico; Daniel Falconi; Roberto Silva; Víctor de la Fuente; Ernesto Avila

=== Women's All-Events ===
Games	Gold	Silver	Bronze
1995 Mar del Plata	Liz Johnson; United States	Edda Piccini; Mexico	Luz Leal; Colombia

=== Women's team ===
Games	Gold	Silver	Bronze
1991 Havana	United States; Maureen Webb; Julie Gardner; Mandy Wilson; Lynda Norry	Venezuela; Mirella DeTrasolini; Gisela Sanchez; Mariela Alarza; Gabriela Bigai	Mexico; Edda Piccini; Ana Maria Avila; Leticia Rosas; Celia Flores
1995 Mar del Plata	Canada; Sandy Lowe; Anne Saasto; Debbie Ship; Catharine Willis	United States; Lisa Bishop; Lesia Stark; Missy Howard; Liz Johnson	Venezuela; Margalit Mizrachi; Mariela Alarza; Marianela Lista; Mirella Trasolini
1999 Winnipeg	United States; Tennelle Grijalva; Debbie Kuhn; Kelly Kulick; Janette Piesczynski	Colombia; Paola Gómez; María Salazar; Clara Guerrero; Sara Vargas	Mexico; Leticia Ituarte; Maria Martinez; Gloria Ortega; Veronica Hernandez

== Events ==
Event	1991	1995	1999	2003	2007	2011	2015	2019	2023	2027
Men's singles	•	•	•	•	•	•	•	•	•	•
Men's doubles		•		•	•	•	•	•	•	•
Men's team	•	•	•							
Men's All-Events		•								
Women's singles	•	•	•	•	•	•	•	•	•	•
Women's doubles		•		•	•	•	•	•	•	•
Women's team	•	•	•							
Women's All-Events		•								
Events	4	8	4	4	4	4	4	4	4	4
