= Venues of the 1999 Pan American Games =

Sports venues in Winnipeg, Manitoba, Canada

The 1999 Pan American Games were held in Winnipeg, Manitoba, Canada and surrounding area. The Pan American Games ran from July 23 to August 8, 1999.

== Planning ==
A total of 32 sporting venues were used for the games. The Pan Am Pool, built for the 1967 games, featured in the 1999 games for all aquatic events. The venue underwent a $3.3 million renovation for the games. Other new venues included the $8.7 million Investors Group Athletic Centre built for multiple sports and the $12 million CanWest Global Park for the baseball competition.

The main stadium for the games was the Winnipeg Stadium, which staged the ceremonies and the beach volleyball competitions.

A portion of the Pan American Games Society (1999) budget supported the refurbishment of University of Manitoba campus residences to serve as the Athletes Village, the upgrade of various sport and training facilities including the Pan Am Stadium (University Stadium), which had hosted events of the 1967 games.

The Winnipeg Velodrome, also built for the 1967 games, had become obsolete and disused for cycling and so was demolished prior to the 1999 games. The 1999 games used a temporary facility at Red River Exhibition Park.

== Winnipeg venues ==
Venue	Sports	Capacity	Ref.
Assiniboine Park	Archery; Athletics (race walk)		
CanWest Global Park	Baseball (preliminaries through medal round)		
Centennial Concert Hall	Weightlifting		
Duckworth Centre	Boxing; Karate; Racquetball (preliminaries)		
Grant Park High School	Roller sports (speed)		
Investors Group Athletic Centre	Basketball (preliminaries); Gymnastics (rhythmic); Volleyball (preliminaries)		
Kildonan East Collegiate	Field hockey		
Le Club La Verendrye	Bowling		
Maples Complex	Fencing; Modern pentathlon		
Max Bell Centre	Inline hockey Roller sports (figure)		
Pan Am Pool	Diving; Swimming; Synchronized swimming Water polo		
Red River Exhibition Park (Red River Meadows)	Equestrian (jumping)		
Red River College soccer field	Football (women)		
Red River College Gym	Table tennis		
University Stadium	Athletics		
Winnipeg Arena	Basketball (preliminaries and medal round); Gymnastics (artistic); Volleyball (preliminaries and medal round)		
Winnipeg Convention Centre Hall A	Badminton; Handball		
Winnipeg Convention Centre Hall B	Judo; Taekwondo; Wrestling		
Winnipeg Lawn Tennis Club	Tennis		
Winnipeg Squash Racquet Club	Squash (preliminaries)		
Winnipeg Soccer Complex	Football (men)		
Winnipeg Stadium	Beach volleyball Ceremonies (opening/closing)		
Winnipeg Winter Club	Racquetball (preliminaries + finals); Squash (preliminaries + finals)		

== Venues outside of Winnipeg ==
Venue	Sports	City/Town	Capacity	Ref.
Birds Hill Provincial Park	Cycling (road); Roller sports (speed road events); Triathlon	—N/a		
Birds Hill Provincial Park Equestrian Facility	Equestrian (dressage and eventing)	—N/a	10,000	
Birch Ski Area	Cycling (mountain biking)	Roseisle		
Gimli Yacht Club	Sailing	Gimli	1,000	
John Blumberg Softball Complex	Softball	Headingley	8,500	
Minnedosa Lake	Canoeing; Rowing	Minnedosa		
Stonewall Quarry Park	Baseball (Preliminaries + quarterfinal)	Stonewall		
Transcona Water Ski Site	Water skiing	Transcona		
Winnipeg Revolver And Pistol Association	Shooting (pistol + rifle)	West St. Paul		
Winnipeg Trap & Skeet Club	Shooting (shotgun)	Oak Bluff		
