= Colombia at the 1999 Pan American Games =

- IOC code: COL
- NOC: Colombian Olympic Committee
- Website: www.olimpicocol.co (in Spanish)

in Winnipeg July 23 – August 8, 1999
- Competitors: 168 in 23 sports
- Medals Ranked 7th: Gold 7 Silver 17 Bronze 18 Total 42

Pan American Games appearances (overview)
- 1951; 1955; 1959; 1963; 1967; 1971; 1975; 1979; 1983; 1987; 1991; 1995; 1999; 2003; 2007; 2011; 2015; 2019; 2023

The 13th Pan American Games were held in Winnipeg, Manitoba, Canada from July 23 to August 8, 1999.

== Medals ==
=== Gold ===
===== Bowling =====
- Men's Singles: David Romero

===== Cycling =====
- Men's Points Race: Marlon Pérez

===== Weightlifting =====
- Men's Light-Heavyweight (– 85 kg): Álvaro Velasco
- Men's Lightweight (– 69 kg): Jonny González

=== Silver ===
===== Athletics =====
- 10,000 metres: Stella Castro
- Marathon: Iglandini González

===== Bowling =====
- Women's Team: Paola Gómez, María Salazar, Clara Guerrero, and Sara Vargas

===== Cycling =====
- Men's Keirin: Jhon González
- Women's 3.000m Individual Pursuit: María Luisa Calle

===== Gymnastics =====
- Men's Parallel Bars: Jorge Giraldo

===== Karate =====
- Men's Kumite (– 65 kg): Alberto Espejo

===== Weightlifting =====
- Men's Flyweight (– 56 kg): Nelson Castro
- Men's Featherweight (– 62 kg): Roger Berrio
- Men's Lightweight (– 69 kg): Heriberto Barbosa
- Women's Flyweight (– 48 kg): Leddy Zuluaga
- Women's Lightweight (– 63 kg): María Perea Díaz
- Women's Super Heavyweight (+ 75 kg): María Isabel Urrutia

=== Bronze ===
===== Athletics =====
- 200 metres: Felipa Palacios

===== Boxing =====
- Men's Middleweight (– 75 kg): José Luis Herrera

===== Cycling =====
- Men's 4.000m Individual Pursuit: Marlon Pérez
- Women's 25 km Points Race: María Luisa Calle

===== Gymnastics =====
- Men's Pommel Horse: Jorge Giraldo

===== Squash =====
- Men's Team Competition: Colombia

===== Water Skiing =====
- Men's Jump: Simón Siegert

===== Weightlifting =====
- Women's Featherweight (– 53 kg): Luz Adriana Gallego
- Women's Super Heavyweight (+ 75 kg): Carmenza Delgado

== Results by event ==
===== Athletics =====
- Gilmar Mayo
- Héctor Moreno
- María Eugenia Villamizar
- Zuleima Araméndiz
- Orlando Guerrero
- Janeth Lucumí
- Iglandini González
- Felipa Palacios
- Mirtha Brock
- Norfalia Carabalí
- Norma González
- Patricia Rodríguez
- Sandra Borrero
- Antonio Florián Álvarez

===== Bowling =====
- Abraham Jaimes
- Javier Hernández Mora
- Jorge David Romero
- Jaime Andrés Gómez
- María Salazar
- Paola Gómez
- Sara Vargas
- Clara Guerrero
- Antonio Salazar

===== Boxing =====
- Carlos Mesa Baena
- Francisco Calderón
- José Luis Herrera
- José Leonardo Cruz
- Wilfrido Valdéz
- Mario Miranda

===== Cycling =====
- John Ramírez
- Jhon García
- Víctor Herrera
- Juan David Alzate
- Luis Felipe Laverde
- Marlon Pérez
- John Jaime González
- María Luisa Calle
- Víctor Hugo Peña
- Santiago Botero
- Iván Parra
- Hernán Antolinez
- Diego Garavito
- Carlos Andrés Trujillo
- Flor Marina Delgadillo
- Antonio Dieguez

===== Equestrian =====
- César Parra
- Stephanie O'Mara
- Tatiana Londoño
- Marco Bernal
- Germán Camargo
- Manuel Torres
- Roberto González
- Roberto Terán
- Pedro Chitiva

===== Fencing =====
- Juan Miguel Paz
- Mauricio Rivas
- Saúl Andrés Vasco
- William González
- Agapito Nusa

===== Gymnastics =====
- Alexánder Rangel
- Jorge Giraldo
- Jesús Augusto Romero
- Jairo Ruiz

===== Judo =====
- Javier Jaramillo
- José Gerardo Serna

===== Karate =====
- Alberto Espejo
- Carlos Ignacio Gómez
- José Julián Quinchía
- Sandra Upegui
- Iván Parra

===== Roller Skating =====
- Erika Rueda
- Berenice Moreno
- José Fernando Bustamante
- Diego Rosero
- Mauricio Jaramillo
- Willy Augusto Trujillo
- Ana María Neira
- Pilar Delgado
- Edwin Guevara

===== Shooting =====
- Adriana Rendón
- Amanda Haydee Mondol
- Andrés Felipe Torres
- Bernardo Tovar
- Danilo Caro
- María Teresa Rueda
- Jorge Jaramillo
- Juan Fernando Velázquez
- Jairo Reyna
- Luis Onelio Argota

===== Softball =====
- Ana María Jailler
- Adriana Galego
- Ana Patricia Pussey
- Ana María Aigneren
- Luz Helena Montes
- María Elena Galeano
- Isabel Bonfante
- Zunilda Mendoza
- Ana Patricia Buj
- Claudia León
- Bertha Sofía Gómez
- Yadelcy Flórez
- Eugenia Liliana
- Beatriz Cudriz
- Claudia Miranda

===== Squash =====
- Alfonso Vargas
- Daniel Lombana
- Bernardo Samper
- Diana Samper
- Isabel Botero
- María Castro
- Martha Luz Vega
- Santiago Montoya
- Mario Leiva

===== Swimming =====
- Alejandro Bermúdez
- Fernando Jácome
- Isabel Ceballos
- María Alejandra Ortiz
- Jacqueline Gaona
- Erika Piedrahíta
- Jessica Baross

===== Table tennis =====
- Diego Germán Ramírez
- Carlos Andrés Alvarado
- Paúl Alfonso Díaz
- Darío Ferrer

===== Taekwondo =====
- Carolina Bejarano
- Eduardo González
- Milton Eliécer Castro
- Mónica Urrego
- Iván Darío Valencia

===== Triathlon =====
- Maria Morales
- Ricardo Cardeño
- John Freddy Tibocha
- María Virginia Prieto
- Vela Sebastián Higuera
- Camilo Salcedo
- Solmar Bermúdez
- Nicolás Deeb
- Hernán Salcedo

===== Volleyball =====
- Omar Zapata
- Francisco Sandoval
- Andrés Cortés
- Carlos López
- Jorge Olarte
- Álvaro Velasco
- Jaime Viáfara
- Carlos Riascos
- Juan José Parra
- Mauricio Giraldo
- Harold Ramírez
- Diego Escobar
- Rodrigo Canaval

===== water polo =====
- Normas Ríos
- Libardo Arboleda
- Álvaro Zapata
- David Alarcón
- Joaquín Ortíz
- Andrés Madrid
- Pablo Jiménez
- Jorge González
- Camilo Pérez
- César Molina
- Roberto Quitero
- Juan Madrid
- Sebastían Hernández
- Rafael Cuartas
- Holmes Arias
- David Rivera
- John Rivera
- Felipe Giraldo
- Héctor Escobar
- Iván Gómez

===== Water Skiing =====
- Christian Siegert
- Esteban Siegert
- María Luisa Botero
- Natalia Hernández
- Simón Siegert
- Darío Mesa

===== Weightlifting =====
- Heriberto Barbosa
- Luz Adriana Gallego
- Álvaro Velasco
- Leddy Andrea Zuluaga
- Bibiana Muñoz
- Juan Carlos Fernández
- María Alejandra Perea
- María Isabel Urrutia
- Roger Berrío Hernández
- Johnny González Beltrán
- Nelson Castro
- José Oliver Ruíz
- Karouchokov Gantcho

===== Wrestling =====
- Luis Fernando Izquierdo
- Víctor Capacho
- Edison Hurtado Lerma
- Luis Cortés
- Isidro Cañedo

== See also ==
- Colombia at the 2000 Summer Olympics
