= Cycling at the 1999 Pan American Games =

The cycling competition at the 1999 Pan American Games was held in Winnipeg, Manitoba, Canada.

== Men's competition ==
=== Men's Individual Road Race ===
- Held on August 4 over 2033 kilometres

RANK	FINAL	TIME
1st place, gold medalist(s)	Brian Walton (CAN)	4:46:26
2nd place, silver medalist(s)	Gord Fraser (CAN)	4:48:18
3rd place, bronze medalist(s)	Pedro Pérez Márquez (CUB)	4:48:18
4	David Clinger (USA)	4:48:18
5	Luis Sepúlveda (CHI)	4:48:18
6	Jesús Zárate (MEX)	4:48:18
7	Rubert Marín (COL)	4:48:18
8	Miny Marcio (BRA)	4:48:18
9	Anton Villatoro Bird (GUA)	4:48:18
10	Ernan Antolinez (COL)	4:48:18
11	Hussein Monsalve (VEN)	4:48:18
12	Manuel Guevara (VEN)	4:48:18
13	Federico Moreira (URU)	4:48:18
14	Irving Aguilar (MEX)	4:48:18
15	Elliot Hubbard (BER)	4:48:18
16	Oscar Villalobo (ARG)	4:48:18
17	Eric Wohlberg (CAN)	4:48:24
18	Pérez Arango (COL)	4:48:24
19	Cassio Freitas (BRA)	4:48:37
20	Czeslaw Lukaszewicz (CAN)	4:48:39
21	R. Basulto Gómez (CUB)	4:48:47
22	Víctor Peña (COL)	4:48:55
23	L. Leitheimer (USA)	4:49:20
24	Tomás Margalef (URU)	5:01:26
25	G. Garrido Zenteno (CHI)	5:01:26
26	Carlitos Jones (BAR)	5:07:54
27	Angel Flanegin (ARU)	5:07:54
28	Guillermo Brunetta (ARG)	5:07:54
29	Stefan Baraud (CAY)	5:07:54
30	José Zeceña Carpio (GUA)	5:07:54
31	Erick Castaño (ECU)	5:07:54
32	Alexis Méndez (VEN)	5:07:54
34	Rubén Pegorín (ARG)	5:07:54
35	Andrew Smiling (BIZ)	5:07:54
36	José Cruz Pérez (DOM)	5:07:54
37	Miguel Pérez Laparra (GUA)	5:07:54
38	Harwin Méndez (VEN)	5:07:54
39	Pablo Viracocha (ECU)	5:07:54
40	C. Hernández (MEX)	5:07:54
41	Juan Fierro González (CHI)	5:07:54
42	Alejandro Mendoza (MEX)	5:07:54
43	Ernest Meighan (BIZ)	5:07:54
44	Milton Wynants (URU)	5:07:54
45	Luciano Pagliarini (BRA)	5:07:54
46	Wendy Cruz Martínez (DOM)	5:07:54
47	Daniel Rogelin (BRA)	5:07:54
48	Gregorio Bare (URU)	5:07:54
49	E. Valdés Prieto (CUB)	5:07:54
50	Iddis Tabarez Díaz (CUB)	5:07:54
—	Derek Bouchard-Hall (USA)	DNF
—	Stefan Larsen (USA)	DNF
—	Rudy Ispache Guzmán (GUA)	DNF
—	Carlos Faraj Díaz (HON)	DNF
—	Michael Vernon (CAY)	DNF
—	Enzo Cesario (CHI)	DNF
—	Gustavo Toledo (ARG)	DNS
—	Víctor Mendoza (BOL)	DNS

=== Men's Road Time Trial ===
- Held on July 25 over 55.2 kilometres

RANK	CYCLIST	TIME
1st place, gold medalist(s)	Eric Wohlberg (CAN)	1:07:30.91
2nd place, silver medalist(s)	Levi Leipheimer (USA)	1:08:02.25
3rd place, bronze medalist(s)	Márcio May (BRA)	1:09:38.90
4.	Dylan Casey (USA)	1:10:45.90
5.	Víctor Hugo Peña (COL)	1:11:23.32
6.	Rubén Pegorín (ARG)	1:12:09.84
7.	Federico Moreira (URU)	1:12:17.77
8.	Anton Villatoro (GUA)	1:12:28.08

=== Men's 1000 m Track Time Trial ===
- Held on July 28

RANK	CYCLIST	TIME
1st place, gold medalist(s)	Julio César Herrera (CUB)	1:04.487
2nd place, silver medalist(s)	Erin Hartwell (USA)	1:05.347
3rd place, bronze medalist(s)	Doug Baron (CAN)	1:05:508
4.	Marcelo Ammendolia (ARG)	1:05.815
5.	Enzo Cesario (CHI)	1:06.572
6.	Michael Phillips (TRI)	1:07.307
7.	Gregorio Bare (URU)	1:07.743
8.	Shawn Kelly (BAR)	1:08.204
9.	Víctor Ordóñez (GUA)	1:10.718
10.	Antônio Murilo (BRA)	1:10.805

=== Men's 4000 m Individual Pursuit ===
- Held on July 29

RANK	CYCLIST	TIME
1st place, gold medalist(s)	Dylan Casey (USA)	4.29.513
2nd place, silver medalist(s)	Walter Pérez (ARG)	4.31.642
3rd place, bronze medalist(s)	Marlon Pérez (COL)	4.34.823
4.	Brian Walton (CAN)	4.37.271

=== Men's Match Sprint ===
- Held on July 30

RANK	CYCLIST	POINTS
1st place, gold medalist(s)	Marty Nothstein (USA)	2-0
2nd place, silver medalist(s)	Marcello Arrue (USA)	—
3rd place, bronze medalist(s)	Julio César Herrera (CUB)	2-0
4.	Alexander Cornieles (VEN)	—
5.	Barry Forde (BAR)	—
6.	Sebastian Alexandre (ARG)	—

=== Men's Points Race ===
- Held on July 30

RANK	CYCLIST	POINTS
1st place, gold medalist(s)	Marlon Pérez (COL)	24
2nd place, silver medalist(s)	Luis Martínez (MEX)	16
3rd place, bronze medalist(s)	Milton Wynants (URU)	15
4.	Gabriel Curuchet (ARG)	29 (-1)
5.	Brian Walton (CAN)	27 (-1)
6.	James Carney (USA)	21 (-1)

=== Men's 4000 m Team Pursuit ===
- Held on July 30

RANK	TEAM	TIME
1st place, gold medalist(s)	USA	4.20.24
2nd place, silver medalist(s)	CUB	4.27.65
3rd place, bronze medalist(s)	ARG	4.19.66
4.	CHI	4.23.48

=== Men's Madison ===
- Held on July 31

RANK	CYCLIST	POINTS
1st place, gold medalist(s)	Gabriel Curuchet (ARG); Juan Curuchet (ARG)	14
2nd place, silver medalist(s)	Jame Carney (USA); Brian Whitcomb (USA)	39 (-4)
3rd place, bronze medalist(s)	Richard Rodríguez (CHI); Luis Fernando Sepúlveda (CHI)	28 (-4)
4.	Miguel Ubeto (VEN); Tomás Gil (VEN)	27 (-4)
5.	Yiovani López (COL); Jhon García (COL)	23 (-4)
6.	Luis Martínez (MEX); Fernando Avíla † (MEX)	8 (-4)

=== Men's Keirin ===
- Held on July 31

RANK	CYCLIST	POINTS
1st place, gold medalist(s)	Marty Nothstein (USA)	11.214
2nd place, silver medalist(s)	Jhon González (COL)	—
3rd place, bronze medalist(s)	Mario Joseph (TRI)	—
4.	Sebastian Alexandre (ARG)	—
5.	Barry Forde (BAR)	—

=== Men's Olympic Sprint ===
- Held on July 31

RANK	CYCLIST	POINTS
1st place, gold medalist(s)	Marcello Arrue (USA); Johnny Barios (USA); Marty Nothstein (USA)	47.129
2nd place, silver medalist(s)	Joel Gelabert (CUB); Yosmani Rodríguez (CUB); Julio César Herrera (CUB)	47.899
3rd place, bronze medalist(s)	Sebastián Alexandre (ARG); Marcelo Ammendolia (ARG); Juan Haedo (ARG)	48.179
4.	Douglas Baron (CAN); James Fisher (CAN); Lars Madsen (CAN)	48.486
5.	Barry Forde (BAR); Shawn Kelly (BAR); John Cumberbatch (BAR)	48.824
6.	Clinton Grant (TRI); Michael Phillips (TRI); Mario Joseph (TRI)	48.587
7.	Richard Rodríguez (CHI); Enzo Cesario (CHI); Francisco Cabrera (CHI)	50.139

=== Men's Mountain Bike Race ===
- Held on August 2 (Started 19, Finished 14)

RANK	CYCLIST	TIME
1st place, gold medalist(s)	Edward Larsen (USA)	2:19:21
2nd place, silver medalist(s)	Carl Swenson (USA)	+ 1:09
3rd place, bronze medalist(s)	Christopher Sheppard (CAN)	+ 1:29
4.	Andrés Brenes (CRC)	+ 3:08
5.	Seamus McGrath (CAN)	+ 3:42
6.	Márcio Ravelli (BRA)	+ 4:33
7.	Ziranda Madrigal (MEX)	+ 9:28
8.	Federico Ramírez (CRC)	+ 11:01
9.	Salvador Barriga (MEX)	+ 11:43
10.	Jaime Mora (COL)	+ 13:57

== Women's competition ==
=== Women's Individual Road Race ===
- Held on August 4 over 81.3 kilometres

RANK	CYCLIST	TIME
1st place, gold medalist(s)	Karen Dunne (USA)	2:11:32
2nd place, silver medalist(s)	Yoanka González (CUB)	—
3rd place, bronze medalist(s)	Janildes Fernandes (BRA)	—
4.	Lyne Bessette (CAN)	—
5.	María Molina de Ortíz (GUA)	+ 2:42
6.	Flor Marina Delgadillo (COL)	+ 3:08
7.	Clara Hughes (CAN)	+ 3:42
8.	María Luisa Calle (COL)	+ 2:42

=== Women's Road Time Trial ===
- Held on July 25 over 27.5 kilometres

RANK	CYCLIST	TIME
1st place, gold medalist(s)	Elizabeth Emery (USA)	37:39.84
2nd place, silver medalist(s)	Lyne Bessette (CAN)	37:59.76
3rd place, bronze medalist(s)	Mary Holden (USA)	38:35.07
4.	Clara Hughes (CAN)	39:22.27
5.	Maureen Kaila Vergara (ESA)	40:06.41
6.	Madelin Jorge Salgado (CUB)	40:29.29
7.	Yulier Rodríguez Jiménez (CUB)	40:54.89
8.	Lorena Colman (ARG)	43:30.93
9.	Janildes Fernandes (BRA)	44:45.13

=== Women's 500 m Time Trial ===
- Held on July 28

RANK	CYCLIST	TIME
1st place, gold medalist(s)	Tanya Dubnicoff (CAN)	35.394
2nd place, silver medalist(s)	Nancy Contreras (MEX)	35.962
3rd place, bronze medalist(s)	Yumari González (CUB)	36.255
4.	Daniela Larreal (VEN)	36.589
5.	Jennie Reed (USA)	37.109
6.	Daniela Donadio (ARG)	37.841

=== Women's Match Sprint ===
- Held on July 30

RANK	CYCLIST	TIME
1st place, gold medalist(s)	Tanya Dubnicoff (CAN)	—
2nd place, silver medalist(s)	Jennie Reed (USA)	—
3rd place, bronze medalist(s)	Yumari González (CUB)	—
4.	Nancy Contreras (MEX)	—
5.	Karelia Machado (VEN)	—

=== Women's 3000 m Individual Pursuit ===
- Held on July 30

RANK	CYCLIST	TIME
1st place, gold medalist(s)	Erin Veenstra (USA)	—
2nd place, silver medalist(s)	María Luisa Calle (COL)	—
3rd place, bronze medalist(s)	Yoanka González (CUB)	—
4.	Lyne Bessette (CAN)	—

=== Women's 25 km Points Race ===
- Held on July 31

RANK	CYCLIST	POINTS
1st place, gold medalist(s)	Erin Veenstra (USA)	42
2nd place, silver medalist(s)	Belem Guerrero (MEX)	23
3rd place, bronze medalist(s)	María Luisa Calle (COL)	22
4.	Dania Pérez Serrano (CUB)	20
5.	Maureen Kaila Vergara (ESA)	0
6.	Mandy Poitras (CAN)	5 (-1)
7.	Verónica Martínez (ARG)	5 (-1)
8.	Daniela Larreal (VEN)	DNF

=== Women's Mountain Bike Race ===
- Held on August 2

RANK	CYCLIST	TIME
1st place, gold medalist(s)	Alison Dunlap (USA)	2:09:44
2nd place, silver medalist(s)	Alison Sydor (CAN)	+ 2:19
3rd place, bronze medalist(s)	Jimena Florit (ARG)	+ 8:42
4.	Flor Delgadillo (COL)	+ 17:22
5.	Cariza Muñoz (MEX)	+ 22:10
6.	Adriana Nascimento (BRA)	+ 28:11
7.	Arnolia Bianco Abbott (DOM)	Lapped

== Medal table ==
Place	Nation	Gold medal	Silver medal	Bronze medal	Total
1	United States	11	5	2	18
2	Canada	4	3	2	9
3	Cuba	1	3	5	9
4	Colombia	1	2	2	5
5	Argentina	1	1	3	5
6	Mexico	0	3	0	3
7	Brazil	0	1	1	2
8	Chile	0	0	1	1
8	Trinidad and Tobago	0	0	1	1
8	Uruguay	0	0	1	1
Total		18	18	18	53
