= Sergio Salazar (pentathlete) =

Mexican modern pentathlete (born 1973)

Personal information
- Born: 17 October 1973 (age 52) Mexico City, Mexico

Sport
- Sport: Modern pentathlon
Medal record
Representing Mexico
Pan American Games
Bronze medal – third place	1999 Winnipeg	Men's individual
Bronze medal – third place	2003 Santo Domingo	Men's individual
Central American and Caribbean Games
Gold medal – first place	2002 San Salvador	Men's team
Silver medal – second place	2002 San Salvador	Men's individual

Sergio Salazar (born 17 October 1973) is a Mexican modern pentathlete. He competed at the 1996 Summer Olympics and the 2004 Summer Olympics.
