= Samantha Harvey (disambiguation) =

Samantha Harvey (born 1975) is an English author.

Samantha Harvey may also refer to:

- Samantha Harvey (pentathlete) (born 1972), American-born Brazilian modern pentathlete
- Samantha Harvey (singer) (born 1993), British pop singer
