= Velizar Iliev =

American modern pentathlete

Personal information
- Nationality: American
- Born: March 9, 1966 (age 60) Vratsa, Bulgaria

Sport
- Sport: Modern pentathlon
Medal record
Representing United States
Pan American Games
Gold medal – first place	1999 Winnipeg	Men's

Velizar Iliev (born March 9, 1966) is an American modern pentathlete. He competed in the men's individual event at the 2000 Summer Olympics.
