= Sam Katz =

Canadian businessman and former politician

Sam Katz OM
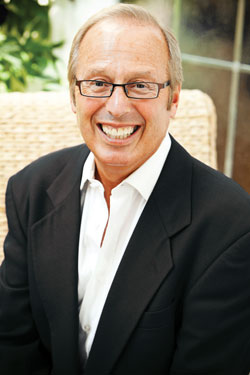

42nd Mayor of Winnipeg
- In office June 22, 2004 – November 3, 2014
- Preceded by: Glen Murray
- Succeeded by: Brian Bowman

Personal details
- Born: Samuel Michael Katz; August 20, 1951 (age 75) Rehovot, Israel
- Party: Independent
- Children: 2
- Education: University of Manitoba (BA)
- Occupation: Real estate developer; theatre producer

Samuel Michael Katz OM (born August 20, 1951) is a Canadian businessman and former politician who was the 42nd mayor of Winnipeg, Manitoba from 2004 to 2014. He is the owner of the Winnipeg Goldeyes of the American Association, as well as the Ottawa Titans of the Frontier League. He was owner of the Winnipeg Thunder and served as president of the short-lived National Basketball League.

== Life before mayorship ==
Katz was born in Rehovot, Israel. He emigrated to Winnipeg in November 1951 as an infant with his parents, Chaim and Zena Katz, and his older brother, David, and was raised in North Winnipeg. Shortly after graduating in 1973 with a Bachelor of Arts in economics from the University of Manitoba, he opened a retail clothing store in Brandon, Manitoba. Throughout his career he continued his entrepreneurial ventures in real estate and entertainment. His entertainment company, Showtime Productions Inc., brought artists such as Tina Turner, the Rolling Stones, and Paul McCartney, and musicals such as Evita, Les Misérables and The Phantom of the Opera to Winnipeg.

In 1994, he brought professional baseball back to Winnipeg with the Winnipeg Goldeyes, who now play in the American Association. Through this franchise, he arranged for the construction and success of Shaw Park in 1999. Katz was also founder of the Winnipeg Goldeyes Field of Dreams Foundation, an organization that has donated more than a $900,000 to children's charities and non-profit organizations in Manitoba.

== Mayor of Winnipeg (2004–2014) ==
On June 22, 2004, Katz was elected mayor of Winnipeg, beating Dan Vandal, Al Golden, and MaryAnn Mihychuk and receiving 42% of the vote. This came after Glen Murray's resignation as mayor to run in the 2004 federal election.

Katz was reelected in the 2006 elections with 61.60% of the vote. He was elected to a third term in the 2010 elections with 55% of the vote.

=== Mayoral decisions ===
==== Aboriginal Community ====
Katz assumed the role of Secretary of Urban Aboriginal Affairs in 2008. In 2009, Manitoba Métis Federation (MMF) President David Chartrand and Sam Katz launched “It’s My Community Too”. Katz pledged $3 million for aboriginal youth over three years beginning in 2009.

==== Advisory boards ====
Katz created the Mayor's Seniors Advisory Committee in 2007. Katz also created the citizen-led Police Advisory Board. Councillors Jenny Gerbasi, Mike Pagtakhan, Harvey Smith, Lillian Thomas and Dan Vandal voted in opposition to this board because it meets behind closed doors. In 2009, Katz hosted Mayor’s Symposium – A Sustainable Winnipeg. This symposium was a surprise to some residents because Katz has been critiqued for his approach to the environment and sustainability.

==== Economy ====
In 2005, Katz cut the business tax by 20%. Katz created a Special Events Marketing Fund for conferences and special events.

==== Efficiency at City Hall ====
First, the Mayor's Red Tape Commission recommended 30 recommendations to cut red tape. One of the recommendations of the commission was to implement 311. It was operational by January 2009. Expenditures have been posted on Winnipeg.ca since 2007. In 2009, Katz unveiled Plan Winnipeg, a 25-year blueprint for the future.

==== Environment ====
In 2008, Katz committed to a 20% reduction in corporate municipal greenhouse gases. In April 2009 a Mayor’s Symposium – A Sustainable Winnipeg was held and kicked off www.speakupwinnipeg.com, a collaborative approach to city planning that is socially, environmentally and financially sustainable.

==== Infrastructure ====
The Province of Manitoba and The City of Winnipeg negotiated a new infrastructure agreement with the Federal Government and the Provincial Government that included an increase of $50 million over two years (2006–08). Katz endorses the use of P3s (Public, Private Partnership) to fund roads, bridges and paths. This method is reported to have ensured the Charleswood Bridge project (completed in 1995 during Mayor Susan Thompson's term) was built on time and on budget. (Katz had nothing to do with the Charleswood Bridge project, which long preceded his involvement in City Hall.)

==== Property taxes ====
In 2009, Katz pledged to keep property taxes in Winnipeg frozen for the 12th straight year. The policy was applauded by the Canadian Taxpayers Federation, but has been criticized by the Canadian Centre for Policy Alternatives, which, in their 2010 Alternative Budget, said "the semblance of a property tax freeze is only made possible with less transparent tax increases to pick up the slack of fiscal irresponsibility."

==== Recreation ====
Katz supported an indoor soccer facility in The City of Winnipeg. Although controversial, he also championed having a waterpark in Winnipeg.

==== Safety ====
Katz welcomed a bylaw enacted in 2005 to restrict aggressive panhandling. He also committed to alternative options for at-risk youth including participation in sports and activities in community centres as a preventative measure. In 2007, Katz appointed Winnipeg Chief of Police Keith McCaskill. Katz increased the Winnipeg Police Department budget from $140 million to $160 million, which is 20% of the Operating Budget. Operation Clean Sweep became a permanent entity, which is supported by the established permanent Street Crime Unit. After touring New York City, Katz was interested in the creation and implementation of Crimestat, an interactive system to provide up-to-date information to help protect citizens. Katz supported a graffiti control bylaw to stop the sale and possession of spray paint to minors. Katz supported a Winnipeg auto theft suppression strategy as a way to crack down on auto theft.

==== Transportation ====
Construction of the Southwest Rapid Transit Corridor started in summer 2009. A transit strike was averted in 2008. Katz has said that Winnipeg should take full advantage of being the mid-continent trade corridor.

=== Criticism ===
Katz was the subject of criticism after a P3 deal was tabled and provisionally accepted a 30-year deal with Veolia to manage Winnipeg's waste water.

After referring to Winnipeg's five female Olympic medal winners as "beautiful females" whose close-up presence made him "feel like Hugh Hefner", Katz was criticized by a women's studies professor at the University of Manitoba. Reaction from the citizens of Winnipeg was mixed.

Katz is the target of humour in a song by The Consumer Goods. Their song "And the Final Words are Yours, Sam Katz" was entered in medium rotation at a number of local radio stations and offers Katz ironic sympathy for the difficulties of running "a city, a business and a baseball team", the use of Malathion for mosquito fogging, and a military training exercise (Operation Charging Bison).

Katz also came under fire from the city's French-speaking population after removing a bilingual requirement from the criteria for awarding a restaurant license on the Esplanade Riel bridge and backing away from earlier promises to help fund a French-language theatre.

Six days before the Winnipeg City Council voted on the city's operating budget, Katz revised it. This drew criticism from councillor Jenny Gerbasi and the Manitoba director of the Canadian Taxpayers Federation, Adrienne Batra.

==== Riverside Park Management ====
Riverside Park Management is a nonprofit organization founded by Katz in 1997 to create a leasehold stake in the proposed CanWest Park stadium that eventually housed his Winnipeg Goldeyes baseball team. Katz continued his involvement after being elected mayor and when a property tax controversy arose was accused of conflict of interest as he was both Mayor of Winnipeg and president of Riverside Park from August 2005 to April 2008, while the two sides were engaged in a financial dispute.

==== Fire hall construction controversy ====
A 2013 city-commissioned report on the construction of new fire halls alleged that Shindico, a Winnipeg-based commercial real-estate developer, received the contract due to favouritism. According to CBC News, the developer was granted building rights after previous correspondence between Shindico and the former fire chief, Reid Douglas, despite being the highest bidder. Katz in particular was criticized due to his long-standing relationship with Shindico, of which he had partial financial ownership until 2013. Katz said his financial ties to Shindico had been severed, and denied any allegations of favouritism or involvement in the fire hall contract.

Immediately after the report was published, multiple city councillors asked for Katz's resignation due to the fire hall situation. Katz's friendship with Phil Sheegl, the former City of Winnipeg Chief Administrative Officer who negotiated the fire hall contract, received substantial attention. Katz stated that the councillors were entitled to their opinions but that he would not resign.

==== Uniter opinion piece and lawsuit ====
Shortly after the fire hall report was released, an opinion piece written by a volunteer was published by the Uniter, the University of Winnipeg's main student newspaper. The piece, which criticized the mayor's handling of the fire hall, resulted in Katz's suing the university, the Uniter and the author of the piece. Katz said he was seeking an apology, as he knew that the Uniter did not have the funds necessary for a financial settlement. The university stated that it believed its involvement in the lawsuit was an error, given that it had no editorial oversight of the student paper. As of February 6, 2014, the case had not been heard in court.

== Honours ==
In 2002, Katz was presented with the Queen's Golden Jubilee Medal. In 2003, he received the University of Manitoba Distinguished Alumnus Award. In 2004, he was given the province's highest honour, the Order of Manitoba, for demonstrating an ability to improve the social, cultural and economic well-being of Manitoba and its residents.

== Personal life ==
Sam was married to Baillie, with whom he's had two daughters (born in 2001 and 2005). Katz began divorce proceedings with his wife on October 26, 2006 – one day after his reelection. Katz is married to Leah Pasuta.

== Electoral record ==
Winnipeg municipal by-election, June 22, 2004: Mayor of Winnipeg
Candidate	Votes	%
Sam Katz	99,015	42.51
Dan Vandal	55,644	23.89
Allan Golden	34,562	14.84
MaryAnn Mihychuk	23,412	10.05
Garth Steek	16,497	7.08
Gordon Kirkby	1,986	0.85
Shirley Timm-Rudolph	801	0.34
Nelson P. Morrison	528	0.23
Natalie Pollock	453	0.19
Total valid votes	232,898	100.00

2006 Winnipeg municipal election: Mayor of Winnipeg
Candidate	Votes	%
(x)Sam Katz	104,380	61.60
Marianne Cerilli	38,227	22.56
Kaj Hasselriis	22,401	13.22
Ron Pollock	4,444	2.62
Total valid votes	169,452	100.00

2010 Winnipeg Mayoral election
Candidate	Votes	%
(x) Sam Katz	116,308	54.8
Judy Wasylycia-Leis	90,913	42.8
Brad Gross	3,398	1.68
Rav Gill	1,775	0.8
