= 1967 Pan American Games =

5th edition of the Pan American Games

V Pan American Games
- Host: Winnipeg, Canada
- Nations: 28
- Athletes: 2,361
- Events: 169 in 19 sports
- Opening: July 23
- Closing: August 6
- Opened by: Prince Philip, Duke of Edinburgh
- Main venue: Winnipeg Stadium

The 1967 Pan American Games, officially known as the V Pan American Games (French: V Jeux panaméricains) and commonly known as Winnipeg 1967, were held in Winnipeg, Manitoba, Canada, from July 23 to August 6, 1967.

Winnipeg was chosen as host of the Pan American Games on its second try. It first bid for the 1963 Games at the 1959 PASO meeting in Chicago. It lost to São Paulo, Brazil. The Winnipeg Pan American Society then turned its sights to 1967 and was named host at the PASO meeting at the São Paulo Games.

== Host city selection ==
Three cities submitted bids to host the '1967 Pan American Games that were recognized by the Pan American Sports Organization (PASO). On April 22, 1963, Winnipeg was selected over Caracas and Santiago to host the V Pan American Games by the PASO at its general assembly in São Paulo, Brazil.

== Medal count ==
^{1}	Host nation

To sort this table by nation, total medal count, or any other column, click on the icon next to the column title.

Rank	Nation	Gold	Silver	Bronze	Total
1	United States ^{a}	128/120	69/63	47/42	244/225
2	Canada ^{1} ^{a}	17/12	39/37	50/43	106/92
3	Brazil	11	10	5	26
4	Argentina ^{a}	8	14/13	12/11	34/32
5	Mexico	7	16	25	48

Note

The medal counts for the United States, Canada and Argentina are disputed.

== Sports ==
- Athletics
- Baseball
- Basketball
- Boxing
- Cycling
- Diving
- Equestrian
- Fencing
- Field hockey
- Football
- Gymnastics
- Judo
- Rowing
- Sailing
- Shooting
- Swimming
- Tennis
- Volleyball
- Water polo
- Weightlifting
- Wrestling

== Venues ==
The games used 17 different venues with a few still in use after 1967:

- Winnipeg Stadium – opened in 1953 it was used for the opening ceremonies; it was demolished in 2013 for re-development as retail and commercial site known as The Plaza at Polo Park
- Pan Am Stadium, University of Manitoba – hosted track and field and since renamed University Stadium
- Pan Am Pool – Swimming and diving; re-used for 1999 Pan Am Games and now in use as public pool
- Winnipeg Revolver and Pistol Association – shooting (rifle/pistol) ranges belong to a private shooting club. Team storage building now in use as an indoor pistol range.
- Winnipeg Velodrome – Cycling; demolished 1998 and now site of retail stores
- Royal Alexandra Hotel - Press Centre; built in 1908 it closed shortly after the Games ended and was demolished in 1971

== Broadcast ==
- CBC Television

Preceded by São Paulo	V Pan American Games; Winnipeg (1967)	Succeeded by Cali
