= Ziranda Madrigal =

Mexican cyclist

Personal information
- Born: 23 May 1977 (age 48) Uruapan, Michoacán, Mexico

Sport
- Sport: Cycling

Ziranda Madrigal Álvarez-Ugena (born 23 May 1977) he is a Mexican cyclist who specializes in competitive cross-country mountain biking. He is a multiple national champion and represented his country at the 1999 and 2003 Pan American Games, as well as at the 2000 Summer Olympics.

Madrigal currently coaches the Turbo mountain bike team and has also mentored the national mountain bike team of Mexico.
