= Modern pentathlon at the 1999 Pan American Games =

- Modern pentathlon pictogram
- Venue: Maples Complex
- Dates: July 31, 1999
- Competitors: 24 from 8 nations

Modern pentathlon competitions at the 1999 Pan American Games in Winnipeg, Canada were held on July 31, 1999 at the Maples Complex. After being left of the Pan American Games program in 1991 and 1995, the sport made its return. A women's event was also contested for the first time.

== Medal table ==
* Host nation (Canada)

Rank	Nation	Gold	Silver	Bronze	Total
1	United States	2	1	0	3
2	Mexico	0	1	1	2
3	Canada*	0	0	1	1
Totals (3 entries)		2	2	2	6

== Medalists ==
Event	Gold	Silver	Bronze
Men's	Velizar Iliev; United States	Brett Weatherbie; United States	Sergio Salazar; Mexico
Women's	Mary Beth Larsen; United States	Rocío Arias; Mexico	Kara Grant; Canada

== Participating nations ==
A total of eight nations entered 24 modern pentathletes. The numbers in parenthesis represents the number of participants entered.

- Argentina (2)
- Brazil (3)
- Canada (4)
- Chile (2)
- Guatemala (4)
- Mexico (4)
- Peru (1)
- United States (4)

== See also ==
- Modern pentathlon at the 2000 Summer Olympics
