= Modern pentathlon at the 2003 Pan American Games =

Modern pentathlon was one of the sports contested at the 2003 Pan American Games in Santo Domingo, Dominican Republic.

== Events ==
Event	Gold	Silver	Bronze
Men's individual	Vakhtang Iagorashvili; United States	Chad Senior; United States	Sergio Salazar; Mexico
Women´s individual	Anita Allen; United States	Samantha Harvey; Brazil	Mary Beth Larsen-Jagorachvili; United States

== Medal table ==
Rank	Nation	Gold	Silver	Bronze	Total
1	United States	2	1	1	4
2	Brazil	0	1	0	1
3	Mexico	0	0	1	1
Totals (3 entries)		2	2	2	6
