= Winnipeg Enterprises Corporation =

Non-profit organization In Canada

Winnipeg Enterprises Corporation was a non-profit organization in Winnipeg, Manitoba, Canada that owned and operated Winnipeg Stadium and Winnipeg Arena. It was established in 1952 by a group led by Winnipeg Blue Bombers president Culver Riley in an attempt to build a new football stadium at Polo Park. The provincial government gave its approval in July 1952, and under The Winnipeg Enterprises Corporation Incorporation Act, the corporation was to be an arm's-length body that would, in the public interest, oversee the building and operation of the stadium. Soon after the stadium was completed, the corporation was given approval to build the new 9,500 seat Winnipeg Arena next to the stadium.

Winnipeg Enterprises Corporation remained the landlord for both facilities until 2004, when its assets were transferred to the City of Winnipeg's direct control and the corporation's operations were wound down. The opening of the privately-owned MTS Centre in November 2004 rendered Winnipeg Arena obsolete; it was demolished in 2006. The Winnipeg Football Club operated the stadium until relocating to Investors Group Field in 2013.

== See also ==
- Riverside Park Management
