= Soccer at the 1999 Pan American Games =

Soccer (football) at the 1999 Pan American Games
- Venues: Winnipeg Soccer Complex; Red River Community College
- Dates: July 23 − August 7, 1999
- No. of events: 2 (1 men, 1 women)

Soccer (football) competitions at the 1999 Pan American Games in Winnipeg, Canada were held between July 23 and August 7, 1999. The event was called as soccer as the event was held in Canada.

Matches were held at the Winnipeg Soccer Complex and Red River Community College.

The women's competition was held for the first time.

== Medal summary ==
=== Medal table ===
Rank	Nation	Gold	Silver	Bronze	Total
1	Mexico	1	1	0	2
2	United States	1	0	1	2
3	Honduras	0	1	0	1
4	Costa Rica	0	0	1	1
Totals (4 entries)		2	2	2	6

=== Medalists ===
Event	Gold	Silver	Bronze
Men's tournament	Mexico	Honduras	United States
Women's tournament	United States	Mexico	Costa Rica
