= Bowling at the 1999 Pan American Games =

Bowling at the 1991 Pan American Games

This page shows the results of the Bowling Competition for men and women at the 1999 Pan American Games, held from July 23 to August 8, 1999 in Winnipeg, Manitoba, Canada. The event was included for the fourth time at the Pan American Games.

Having been held at the Games as a demonstration sport in 1983, the sport was given full status by the Pan American Sports Organization Council in 1986.

== Men's competition ==
=== Singles ===
| RANK | FINAL | AVERAGE |
|---|---|---|
| Gold medal | David Romero (COL) | 3,544 |
| Silver medal | Michael Mullin (USA) | 3,529 |
| Bronze medal | Marc Doi (CAN) | 3,518 |

=== Team ===
| RANK | FINAL | AVERAGE |
|---|---|---|
| Gold medal | United States • John Gaines • John Eiss • Tony Manna Jr. • Michael Mullin | 14,798 |
| Silver medal | Canada • Mathieu Chouinard • Marc Doi • Jean Sébastian Lessard • Alan Tone | 14,354 |
| Bronze medal | Mexico • Daniel Falconi • Roberto Silva • Victor de la Fuente • Ernesto Avila | 14,157 |

== Women's competition ==
=== Singles ===
| RANK | FINAL | AVERAGE |
|---|---|---|
| Gold medal | Janette Piesczynski (USA) | 3,328 |
| Silver medal | Alicia Marcano (VEN) | 3,327 |
| Bronze medal | Jennifer Willis (CAN) | 3,282 |

=== Team ===
| RANK | FINAL | AVERAGE |
|---|---|---|
| Gold medal | United States • Tennelle Grijalva • Debbie Kuhn • Kelly Kulick • Janette Piesczynski | 13,816 |
| Silver medal | Colombia • Paola Gómez • Maria Salazar • Clara Guerrero • Sara Vargas | 13,516 |
| Bronze medal | Mexico • Leticia Ituarte • María Martínez • Gloria Ortega • Veronica Hernández | 13,514 |

== Medal table ==
| Place | Nation | Gold medal | Silver medal | Bronze medal | Total |
|---|---|---|---|---|---|
| 1 | United States | 3 | 1 | 0 | 4 |
| 2 | Colombia | 1 | 1 | 0 | 2 |
| 3 | Canada | 0 | 1 | 2 | 3 |
| 4 | Venezuela | 0 | 1 | 0 | 1 |
| 5 | Mexico | 0 | 0 | 2 | 2 |
| Total | | 4 | 4 | 4 | 12 |
