= Anita Allen (pentathlete) =

American modern pentathlete (born 1977)

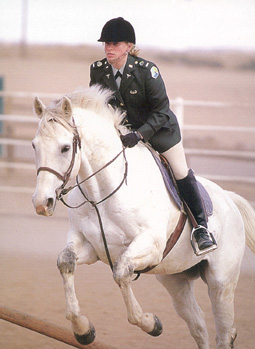

Personal information
- Born: September 10, 1977 (age 48) Star City, Indiana, U.S.
- Education: West Point
- Occupation: United States Army medical service officer
Medal record
Women's modern pentathlon
Representing United States
Pan American Games
Gold medal – first place	2003 Santo Domingo	Modern pentathlon

Anita Allen (born September 10, 1977, in Star City, Indiana) is a United States Army medical service officer who competed in the 2004 Olympic Games in the modern pentathlon, where she finished 18th of 32 competitors. A 2000 graduate of West Point, Allen finished first in the riding portion of the event. She was a standout cross country runner while at the academy. She won the women's modern pentathlon on August 11, 2003, at the 2003 Pan American Games.

== Gallery ==
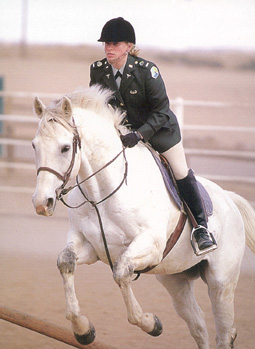

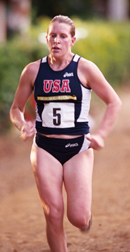

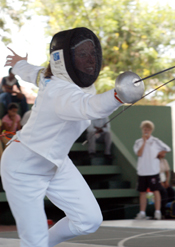

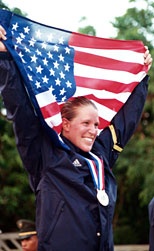
