= Samantha Harvey (pentathlete) =

Brazilian modern pentathlete

Personal information
- Born: October 13, 1972 (age 53) New York City, United States

Sport
- Sport: Modern pentathlon
Medal record
Representing Brazil
Pan American Games
Silver medal – second place	2003 Santo Domingo	Women's

Samantha Celeste Harvey (born October 13, 1972) is a Brazilian modern pentathlete. She placed 25th in the women's individual event at the 2004 Summer Olympics.

Harvey was born in New York City and originally competed for the US, and finished in fourth at the 1999 Pan American Games in Winnipeg, Canada. She is a professor of English at Boise State University in Idaho.
