= Riverside Park Management =

Riverside Park Management Inc.
- Company type: Non-profit
- Industry: property management
- Founded: 1997
- Headquarters: 1 Portage Ave East; Winnipeg, Manitoba, Canada; R3B 3N3
- Key people: Jason McRae-King, President; Sam Katz (Chairman)
- Products: Blue Cross Park (1999-present)

Riverside Park Management is a non-profit organization in Winnipeg, Manitoba, Canada that manages real estate properties including and surrounding Blue Cross Park, home to the Winnipeg Goldeyes baseball club.

== History ==
The organization was founded by Winnipeg businessman Sam Katz in 1997 to create a leasehold stake in the proposed CanWest Park stadium that eventually housed his Winnipeg Goldeyes baseball team. Katz himself served as the company's first president, and took part in negotiations with different levels of government concerning the stadium's construction. Riverside Park later leased the stadium grounds and surrounding lots from the city for $1 per year plus payments equal to property taxes, and sublet the land to the Goldeyes. CanWest Park, now known as Blue Cross Park opened in 1999. In July 2004, the Goldeyes and Riverside Park had the same directors.

Katz was elected as Mayor of Winnipeg in 2004, and remained president of Riverside Park until April 2008. He has said that he ended his involvement with the day-to-day management of the company after his election. His successor as president is Jason McRae-King.

=== Conflict-of-interest controversy ===
Riverside Park became involved in a local controversy after appealing a steep 2006 property tax reassessment for a parking lot next to the arena. Two years after the appeal was launched, Winnipeg's property department asked city council to renegotiate the lease on terms favourable to the company. The city's executive policy committee (i.e. the municipal cabinet) heard evidence that the reassessment occurred because of confusion between two city departments, after Riverside Park was informed that there would be no significant increase.

Some journalists and councilors argued that Katz was involved in a conflict-of-interest over this situation, as he was both Mayor of Winnipeg and president of Riverside Park from August 2005 to April 2008, while the two sides were engaged in a financial dispute. Winnipeg Free Press journalist Bartley Kives argued that the conflict was clear, although he added that there was nothing to suggest the mayor misused his position for personal benefit.

Other concerns were later raised about Riverside Park. Councillor Dan Vandal, a frequent critic of Katz, said that the city should have access to its financial records to determine if it was properly fulfilling its role as a non-profit corporation. Russ Wyatt, a member of Katz's cabinet, expressed concern that Riverside Management did not provide any payments to the city from 2001 to 2004 because its land did not officially appear on assessment rolls, and called for the parking lot controversy to be referred to an outside lawyer.

After a rancorous and divisive debate, city council voted 8-6 to revise the lease and retroactively eliminate $233,000 from Riverside Park's back taxes in late 2008. Katz recused himself from both the vote and debate.

A subsequent investigation by the Winnipeg Free Press raised further concerns about Riverside's financial arrangements with the Goldeyes. In an article entitled "Fair ball?", Bartley Kives wrote that "[l]egal, accounting, ethics and non-profit governance experts" suggested that the relationship between the two entities was "unusual from a business perspective". Kives noted that Riverside Park was then leasing four parcels of land from the City of Winnipeg (covering the stadium and surrounding parking lots), which it then sublet to the Goldeyes. Riverside Park also made regular payments to the Goldeyes, which Kives indicated were "presumably to pay back part of the construction debt". Riverside Park reduced its debt to the Goldeyes by $1.3 million between 2000 and 2005, while the Goldeyes increased their annual rent payments to Riverside Park from $75,000 to over $1 million in the same period. Kives further noted that the Free Press was unable to draw any conclusions regarding the accelerated rent payments, as Riverside Park refused to turn over its books for investigation. A corporate lawyer hired by the Free Press said that he had never seen such an arrangement, while the Manitoba director of the Canadian Taxpayers Federation said the city should have leased the land directly to the for-profit company without going through Riverside Park.

Shortly after city council voted to eliminate Riverside Park's back taxes, the City of Winnipeg took over the parking lot that was the source of the controversy. Katz has repeatedly argued that there was nothing improper about his activities, and has accused the media of sensationalizing the controversy.

== See also ==
- Sam Katz
- Blue Cross Park
- Winnipeg Enterprises Corporation
