= Mexico at the 1999 Pan American Games =

- IOC code: MEX
- NOC: Comité Olímpico Mexicano (in Spanish)

in Winnipeg, Manitoba, Canada July 23 – August 8, 1999
- Medals Ranked 6th: Gold 11 Silver 16 Bronze 30 Total 57

Pan American Games appearances (overview)
- 1951; 1955; 1959; 1963; 1967; 1971; 1975; 1979; 1983; 1987; 1991; 1995; 1999; 2003; 2007; 2011; 2015; 2019; 2023; 2027

The 13th Pan American Games were held in Mar del Plata, Argentina from July 23 – August 8, 1999.

== Medals ==
=== Gold ===
===== Athletics =====
1. Men's 5000 metres - David Galván
2. Men's 20 kilometres walk - Bernardo Segura
3. Men's 50 kilometres walk - Joel Sánchez
4. Women's 400 metres - Ana Guevara
5. Women's 5000 metres - Adriana Fernandez
6. Women's 10,000 metres - Nora Rocha
7. Women's 20 kilometres walk - Graciela Mendoza

===== Diving =====
1. Men's 10m Platform - Fernando Platas

===== Football =====
1. Men's team - Mexico

===== Taekwondo =====
1. Men's Flyweight (– 58 kg) - Óscar Salazar
2. Men's Middleweight (– 80 kg) - Víctor Estrada

=== Silver ===
===== Athletics =====
1. Men's 10,000 metres - David Galván
2. Men's 20 kilometres walk - Daniel Garcia
3. Men's 50 kilometres walk - Carlos Mercenario
4. Women's 20 kilometres walk - Rosario Sánchez

===== Boxing =====
1. Men's Light Flyweight (48 kilograms) - Liborio Romero

===== Cycling =====
1. Men's Points Race - Luis Martínez
2. Women's 500 m Time Trial - Nancy Contreras
3. Women's 25 km Points Race - Belem Guerrero

===== Diving =====
1. Men's 3m Springboard - Fernando Platas

===== Fencing =====
1. Women's Individual foil - Cecilia Esteva

===== Football =====
1. Women's team - Mexico

===== Karate =====
1. Women's Kata - Ulda Alarcon

===== Modern pentathlon =====
1. Women's - Rocío Arias

===== Rowing =====
1. Lightweight Four-Oared Shell Without Coxswain - Mexico

===== Taekwondo =====
1. Men's Heavyweight (+ 80 kg) - Rodrigo Martinez

===== Tennis =====
1. Men's doubles - Óscar Ortiz & Marco Osorio

=== Bronze ===
===== Archery =====
1. Women's team - Mexico

===== Athletics =====
1. Men's 400 metres - Alejandro Cárdenas

===== Badminton =====
1. Men's Doubles - Bernardo Monreal & Luis Lopezllera

===== Beach volleyball =====
1. Women's team - Laura Almaral & Mayra Huerta

===== Bowling =====
1. Men's Doubles - Daniel Falconi, Roberto Silva, Victor de la Fuente, Ernesto Avila
2. Women's Doubles - Leticia Ituarte, Maria Martinez, Gloria Ortega, Veronica Hernández

===== Boxing =====
1. Men's Flyweight (51 kilograms) - Daniel Ponce de León
2. Men's Featherweight (57 kilograms) - Jorge Martinez
3. Men's Lightweight (60 kilograms) - Cristian Bejarano

===== Canoeing =====
1. Men's C-1 1000 metres - José Romero
2. Men's C-2 1000 metres - Mexico

===== Diving =====
1. Men's 10m Platform - Eduardo Rueda
2. Women's 10m Platform - María Alcalá

===== Equestrian =====
1. Individual dressage - Bernadette Pujals Cavallo
2. Team dressage - Mexico

===== Judo =====
1. Women's Extra-Lightweight (48 kg) - Adriana Angeles

===== Karate =====
1. Men's Kata - Hector Ortiz
2. Men's Kumite (75 kg) - Tetsuo Alonso Murayama
3. Men's Kumite (80 kg) - Antonio Puente Torres
4. Women's Kumite (+ 60 kg) - Cristina Madrid

===== Modern pentathlon =====
1. Men's - Sergio Salazar

===== Racquetball =====
1. Men's doubles - Alvaro Beltrán, Javier Moreno

===== Rowing =====
1. Women's Double sculls - Manuela González, Maurenis Hernández

===== Sailing =====
1. Women's Europe class - Tanía Elias Calles

===== Shooting =====
1. Men's 50 metre rifle three positions - Roberto José Elias

===== Squash =====
1. Women's team - Mexico

===== Synchronized swimming =====
1. Team - Mexico

===== Taekwondo =====
1. Women's Flyweight (– 49 kg) - Agueda López

===== Water skiing =====
1. Women's Tricks - Mariana Ramirez

===== Weightlifting =====
1. Women's Lightweight (– 58 kg) - Soraya Jiménez

===== Wrestling =====
1. Greco-Roman (76 kg) - Rodolfo Hernández
