= Winnipeg Arena =

Arena located in Winnipeg

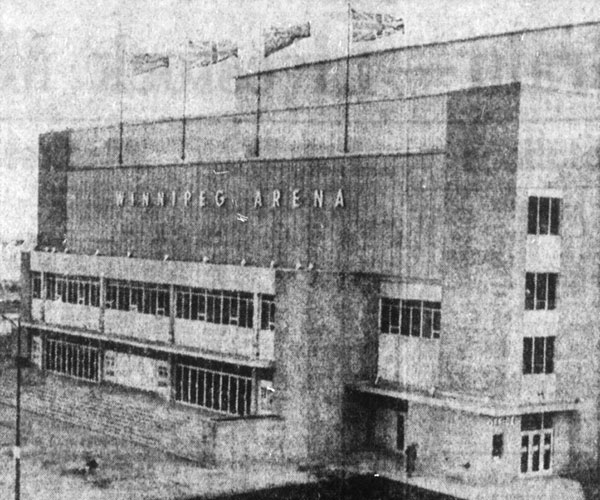
- Interactive map of Winnipeg Arena
- Address: 1430 Maroons Road
- Location: Winnipeg, Manitoba
- Coordinates: 49°53′13″N 97°11′52″W
- Owner: Winnipeg Enterprises Corp.
- Operator: Winnipeg Enterprises Corp.
- Capacity: Ice hockey: 10,100 WHA; Ice hockey: 15,393 NHL; Ice hockey: 13,985 AHL

Construction
- Groundbreaking: October 19, 1954
- Opened: October 18, 1955
- Closed: November 7, 2004
- Demolished: March 26, 2006
- Cost: $2.5 million CAD ($29.1 million in 2025 dollars)
- Architects: Herbert Henry Gatenby Moody Moody and Moore Architects

Tenants
- Winnipeg Warriors (WHL) (1955–1961); Winnipeg Jets/Clubs/Monarchs (WCHL) (1967–1977); Winnipeg Jets (WHA / NHL) (1972–1996); Winnipeg Warriors (WHL) (1980–1984); Winnipeg Thunder (WBL / NBL) (1992–1994); Manitoba Moose (IHL / AHL) (1996–2004)

Winnipeg Arena was an indoor arena located in the Polo Park district of Winnipeg, Manitoba, Canada.

The arena was the city's premier ice hockey venue from 1955 to 2004 and is best remembered as the home of the first Winnipeg Jets franchise, which played in the World Hockey Association (WHA) from 1972 to 1979 and the National Hockey League (NHL) from 1979 to 1996. It was also home to junior and minor league teams such as the Manitoba Moose (1996–2004) and Winnipeg Warriors (1955–1961). The arena closed after the completion of the Canada Life Centre in November 2004 and was later demolished. A retail and commercial complex occupies the site today.

== History ==
=== Early years (1955–1972) ===
Construction on a new facility to replace Winnipeg's obsolete Shea's Amphitheatre began in October 1954. Situated between Winnipeg Stadium and Polo Park, the new arena opened its doors for the 1955–56 hockey season and, in its original configuration, had a seating capacity of approximately 9,500. During the 1950s and 1960s, the Winnipeg Arena was considered to be among the finest facilities in the western half of North America.

The Winnipeg Arena's grand opening occurred in conjunction with the first hockey game played on October 18, 1955, a Western Hockey League minor pro game between the Winnipeg Warriors and the Calgary Stampeders. The ceremonial opening face-off was conducted by Warriors Hockey Club president J. D. Perrin Sr. before a sell-out crowd (including standing room) of 9,671, a then-record for the league. The following year, Perrin offered to purchase the arena and Winnipeg Stadium from Winnipeg Enterprises Corporation. In keeping with the tenor of the times, when public ownership was thought to be advantageous, the offer was rejected. The Warriors called the arena home until 1961, when the club was sold and relocated. Six years later, the arena found a new tenant in the Winnipeg Jets junior hockey club when it began play in the new Western Hockey League. The club would later be renamed the Monarchs and played at the arena until 1977.

On September 6, 1972, the Winnipeg Arena found itself in the international spotlight when it hosted the third game of the Summit Series between Canada and the Soviet Union. Approximately 9,800 spectators packed the arena to witness the two teams battle to a 4–4 draw. The Arena was also host to game 3 of the 1974 Summit Series on September 21, when the Soviets beat Canada 8 to 5.

=== Winnipeg Jets era (1972–1996) ===
A new era for the Winnipeg Arena began in the fall of 1972 when the city's new professional hockey team, the Winnipeg Jets, entered the upstart World Hockey Association. Their on-ice success during the 1970s brought three WHA championship banners to the rafters of the arena and made the Jets the pride of the city and province. Winnipeg Arena hosted the most regular season games of any venue in WHA history with 279, one more game than Colisée de Québec; the last WHA game was held on May 20, 1979 at Winnipeg Arena as the Jets won 7–3 to win their final WHA title. The venue hosted the series-clinching games in 1976, 1978, and 1979, with Winnipeg winning each time. In 1979, the Jets were one of four teams admitted into the National Hockey League following the demise of the WHA, which necessitated a major expansion to the arena to meet the NHL's minimum capacity. The seating capacity was expanded to 15,565, mostly through the construction of upper decks on the east and west sides. The construction of these upper decks created an overhang above the lower deck seating areas, obstructing views according to many spectators. That same year, a painting of Queen Elizabeth II was commissioned for the arena by Francis Lawrence Jobin, the Lieutenant Governor of Manitoba. The painting measured 5 by 7 metres (16 by 23 ft) (one of the largest ever painted of the Queen) and hung from the arena's rafters. A White Way sign centre-hung scoreboard with colour matrix animation boards replaced an American Sign and Indicator centre-hung scoreboard in 1985. The American Sign and Indicator scoreboard, in use since the 1980–1981 season, was moved to Copps Coliseum in Hamilton, Ontario.

During the 1980s, a tradition known as the "White Out" was initiated in which boisterous and sometimes raucous fans dressed in all-white during playoff games to create an intimidating environment for opposing teams. This led to the Winnipeg Arena's reputation as one of the loudest sports venues in North America during the 1980s and 1990s. This tradition continued with the revived Jets team in 2011.

=== Post-Jets era (1996–2004) ===
Financial troubles forced the Jets to leave Winnipeg in 1996. It was a big blow for the city, but the arena was not without a tenant for long, as the Manitoba Moose of the International Hockey League moved in the next season. Renovations once again took place, with the addition of club seats and a new club lounge in place of the North End ice level seats. The Moose would be the arena's last tenant.

The arena found itself back in the international spotlight when it hosted the 1999 IIHF World Junior Hockey Championships. The tournament was a major success, setting a new attendance record, with 170,000 fans taking in the games. With the support of lively crowds reminiscent of the former Jets days, the host Canadian team advanced to the gold medal game, but lost to Russia in overtime.

=== Other uses ===
Aside from hockey, the Winnipeg Arena was often used for basketball, including home games for the Winnipeg Thunder, an independent professional team in the early 1990s; the inaugural Naismith Cup between the Toronto Raptors and Vancouver Grizzlies on October 21, 1995; and 1999 Pan American Games basketball and volleyball tournaments. In preparation for the Games, the portrait of the Queen was removed to make room for banners. It was placed in storage and never returned to the rafters. The arena also played host to charity fundraising hockey games such as Schmockey Night as well as figure skating events like Stars On Ice, Ice Capades, and Disney on Ice. The local Shiners Khartoum Temple also hosted the annual Shrine Circus there.

The arena was also a frequent concert venue and a stop for professional wrestling tours such as the American Wrestling Association and WWE. In television and film, the arena was used for the made-for-television documentary Inside the Osmonds and the ESPN film A Season on the Brink. The arena, along with its multiple hockey tenants, was a major plot point in director Guy Maddin's 2007 film My Winnipeg.

== Demolition ==
The opening of the privately owned MTS Centre, now known as Canada Life Centre, in 2004 meant the end for the Winnipeg Arena. The arena's last official event was an American Hockey League game between the Manitoba Moose and Utah Grizzlies played before a capacity crowd on November 4, 2004. Several former Jets players, including Bobby Hull and Teemu Selänne, were present for a special ceremony as the banners hanging from the rafters were lowered before the game. Most of the memorabilia from the arena including the seats were auctioned off to the public prior to the demolition.

The Winnipeg Arena sat vacant until 2006, at which time the City of Winnipeg took on the $1.45 million expense of demolishing the arena. After the building was gutted, final demolition took place on March 26, 2006. On that morning, hundreds of hockey fans gathered to watch the building fall, while chanting, "Go Jets, Go!" However, the planned implosion failed to bring down the entire structure; construction vehicles later pulled down the remainder. The vacant site was purchased by the Ontario Teachers' Pension Plan for $3.6 million and used as a parking lot for Canad Inns Stadium across the street until construction of new retail and office space began in 2011. The new complex, known as Polo Park North, opened in 2013.

Preceded by First Arena	Home of the Winnipeg Jets; 1972–1996	Succeeded by Philips Arena (as the Atlanta Thrashers)
Preceded by Saint Paul Civic Center	Home of the Manitoba Moose; 1996–2004	Succeeded by MTS Centre
Preceded by Polideportivo Islas Malvinas; Mar del Plata	Pan American Games Basketball Tournament; Venue; 1999	Succeeded by Palacio de los Deportes Virgilio Travieso Soto; Santo Domingo
