= Venezuela at the 1995 Pan American Games =

- IOC code: VEN
- NOC: Venezuelan Olympic Committee
- Website: www.cov.com.ve

in Mar del Plata 11–26 March 1995
- Medals Ranked 7th: Gold 9 Silver 14 Bronze 25 Total 48

Pan American Games appearances (overview)
- 1951; 1955; 1959; 1963; 1967; 1971; 1975; 1979; 1983; 1987; 1991; 1995; 1999; 2003; 2007; 2011; 2015; 2019; 2023

The 13th Pan American Games were held in Mar del Plata, Argentina from March 11 to March 26, 1995.

== Medals ==
=== Gold ===
===== Boxing =====
- Men's Light Flyweight (– 48 kg): Edgar Velasquez

===== Gymnastics =====
- Men's Vault: Víctor Solorzano

===== Swimming =====
- Men's 200 m Butterfly: Nelson Mora

===== Taekwondo =====
- Women's – 51 kg: Eliana Pantoja
- Women's – 55 kg: Oly Padron
- Women's + 70 kg: Adriana Carmona

===== Weightlifting =====
- Men's Light-Heavyweight (– 83 kg): Julio César Luña

=== Silver ===
===== Bowling =====
- Men's All-Events: Pedro Carreyo
- Men's Teams: Agustin de Farias, Pedro Avendano, Arturo Hernández, and Pedro Carreyo
- Women's Singles: Mariela Alarza

===== Judo =====
- Women's Half Heavyweight (– 72 kg): Francis Gómez

===== Taekwondo =====
- Men's – 58 kg: Yosvani Pérez
- Men's – 70 kg: Quidio Quero

=== Bronze ===
===== Boxing =====
- Men's Flyweight (– 51 kg): José Luis Lopez

===== Bowling =====
- Men's All-Events: Agustin de Farias
- Women's Doubles: Margalit Mizrachi and Mariela Alarza
- Women's Teams: Margalit Mizrachi, Mariela Alarza, Marianela Lista, and Mirella Trasolini

===== Judo =====
- Women's Extra Lightweight (– 48 kg): María Villapol
- Women's Half Middleweight (– 61 kg): Xiomara Griffith

===== Swimming =====
- Men's 4 × 100 m Freestyle: Venezuela

===== Synchronized swimming =====
- Women's Solo: María Elena Giusti

===== Taekwondo =====
- Women's – 65 kg: Ohdra Malpica

===== Weightlifting =====
- Men's Featherweight (– 64 kg): Henry Blanco
- Men's Heavyweight (– 108 kg): Pedro Marin

== See also ==
- Venezuela at the 1996 Summer Olympics
