= Bowling at the 1995 Pan American Games =

This page shows the results of the Bowling Competition for men and women at the 1995 Pan American Games, held from March 11 to March 26, 1995, in Mar del Plata, Argentina. The event was included for the third time at the Pan American Games.

== Men's competition ==
=== Singles ===
RANK	FINAL	AVERAGE
Gold medal	Bill Rowe (CAN)	1,295
Silver medal	Patrick Healey (USA)	1,260
Bronze medal	Marco Zepeda (MEX)	1,237

=== Doubles ===
RANK	FINAL	AVERAGE
Gold medal	United States • Patrick Healey • Chris Barnes	2,559
Silver medal	Netherlands Antilles • Samir Daou • Carlos Finx	2,545
Bronze medal	Canada • Mark Doi • Bill Rowe	2,463

=== Teams ===
RANK	FINAL	AVERAGE
Gold medal	United States • Patrick Healey • Mark Van Meter • John Eiss • Chris Barnes	4,923
Silver medal	Venezuela • Agustin de Farias • Pedro Avendano • Arturo Hernández • Pedro Carreyo	4,684
Bronze medal	Canada • Marc Doi • Doug Schatz • Paul Gyarmati • Bill Rowe	4,677

=== All-Events ===
RANK	FINAL	AVERAGE
Gold medal	Patrick Healey (USA)	3,464
Silver medal	Pedro Carreyo (VEN)	3,410
Bronze medal	Agustin de Farias (VEN)	3,404

== Women's competition ==
=== Singles ===
RANK	FINAL	AVERAGE
Gold medal	Catharine Willis (CAN)	1,305
Silver medal	Mariela Alarza (VEN)	1,266
Bronze medal	Lisa Bishop (USA)	1,212

=== Doubles ===
RANK	FINAL	AVERAGE
Gold medal	United States • Missy Howard • Lesia Stark	2,548
Silver medal	Mexico • Georgina Serratos • Gabriela Sandoval	2,463
Bronze medal	Venezuela • Margalit Mizrachi • Mariela Alarza	2,445

=== Teams ===
RANK	FINAL	AVERAGE
Gold medal	Canada • Sandy Lowe • Anne Saasto • Debbie Ship • Catharine Willis	4,676
Silver medal	United States • Lisa Bishop • Lesia Stark • Missy Howard • Liz Johnson	4,557
Bronze medal	Venezuela • Margalit Mizrachi • Mariela Alarza • Marianela Lista • Mirella Trasolini	4,547

=== All-Events ===
RANK	FINAL	AVERAGE
Gold medal	Liz Johnson (USA)	2,726
Silver medal	Edda Piccini (MEX)	2,590
Bronze medal	Luz Leal (COL)	2,485

== Medal table ==
Place	Nation	Gold medal	Silver medal	Bronze medal	Total
1	United States	5	2	1	8
2	Canada	3	0	2	5
3	Venezuela	0	3	3	6
4	Mexico	0	2	1	3
5	Netherlands Antilles	0	1	0	1
6	Colombia	0	0	1	1
Total		8	8	8	24
