= Winnipeg Velodrome =

Cycling facility in Winnipeg, Manitoba

- Interactive map of Winnipeg Velodrome
- Location: Winnipeg, Manitoba, Canada
- Coordinates: 49°53′13″N 97°11′41″W
- Operator: Winnipeg Enterprises
- Capacity: 3,000
- Surface: 400 meters, 38 degrees, concrete

Construction
- Opened: June 5, 1967
- Demolished: 1998
- Cost: $350,000

The Winnipeg Velodrome was a cycling facility built in Winnipeg, Manitoba for the 1967 Pan-American Games and managed by Winnipeg Enterprises. The facility was a banked short-track oval with a cement surface. The velodrome was located near the Winnipeg Arena and Winnipeg Stadium. Notable athletes to compete here include Jocelyn Lovell.

The infield was large enough to accommodate a Canadian football-sized field, and indeed, the Velodrome was an important venue for high-school football in the city. It was planned as a facility that could relieve the larger Winnipeg Stadium from the duty of hosting amateur football, which was taking a serious toll on the grass field and making it unsuitable for professional play. Following the installation of artificial turf at Winnipeg Stadium in 1987, amateur teams resumed playing in the larger facility and football activity at the Velodrome declined sharply. Starting in 1994, the Velodrome was occasionally used as a practice facility by the Winnipeg Blue Bombers of the Canadian Football League on days when the Winnipeg Goldeyes were using the Stadium.

By the 1990s, the facility had become functionally obsolete for competitive cycling, and its use by cyclists had all but ceased. In light of the facility's deterioration, a decision was made to build a temporary velodrome for the 1999 Pan-American Games at the Red River Exhibition Park. The Winnipeg Velodrome was demolished in 1998 and the site is now occupied by retail stores. The temporary facility built to replace the Winnipeg Velodrome was itself disassembled and sold to a group in the Netherlands shortly after the 1999 Pan-American Games, leaving Manitoba without a velodrome facility.

== See also ==
- List of cycling tracks and velodromes
