= Bowling at the 2007 Pan American Games =

The bowling competition of the 2007 Pan American Games in Rio de Janeiro, Brazil was held at the Barra Bowling Center from July 23 to July 26. There were 4 events on offer.

== Medal summary ==
=== Medal table ===
Rank	Nation	Gold	Silver	Bronze	Total
1	United States (USA)	4	0	0	4
2	Mexico (MEX)	0	1	1	2
3	Brazil (BRA)	0	1	0	1
3	Puerto Rico (PUR)	0	1	0	1
3	Venezuela (VEN)	0	1	0	1
6	Dominican Republic (DOM)	0	0	2	2
7	Argentina (ARG)	0	0	1	1
Totals (7 entries)		4	4	4	12

=== Events ===
Event	Gold	Silver	Bronze
Men's individual	Rhino Page; United States	Daniel Falconi; Mexico	Lucas Legnani; Argentina
Women's individual	Tennelle Milligan; United States	Alica Marcano; Venezuela	Aumi Guerra; Dominican Republic
Men's pairs	Rhino Page; Cassidy Schaub; United States	Rodrigo Hermes; Fábio Rezende; Brazil	Víctor Richards; Rolando Sebelen; Dominican Republic
Women's pairs	Tennelle Milligan; Diandra Asbaty; United States	Yoselin León; Michelle Ayala; Puerto Rico	Sandra Góngora; Adriana Pérez; Mexico

== See also ==
- 2007 Pan American Games
