= Rhino Page =

American ten-pin bowler

Personal information
- Born: Ryan Jacob Page; July 10, 1983 (age 43) Topeka, Kansas, U.S.
- Years active: 2003-present (turned pro in 2007)
- Height: 5 ft 7 in (170 cm)
- Website: http://www.rhinopage.com/index.html

Bowling Information
- Affiliation: PBA
- Rookie year: 2008
- Dominant hand: Left (tweener delivery)
- Wins: 6 PBA Tour (1 major)
- 300-games: 15
- Sponsors: Big Bowling
Medal record
Representing United States
Pan American Games
Gold medal – first place	2007 Rio de Janeiro	Individual
Gold medal – first place	2007 Rio de Janeiro	Pairs

Ryan Jacob "Rhino" Page (born July 10, 1983) is a left-handed bowler on the Professional Bowlers Association (PBA) Tour, and was the 2008 PBA Rookie of the Year. (See PBA Bowling Tour: 2007-08 season.)

Page is a former U.S. Amateur champion, winning the event in 2005.

Page attended the University of Kansas in Lawrence, Kansas. He helped the Jayhawks win the school's first-ever Intercollegiate Bowling Championship in 2004, and was named the MVP of the championships.

== Amateur accomplishments ==
- Member of Junior Team USA in 2001 and 2002
- Member of the 2004 Intercollegiate Bowling Championship team (University of Kansas)
- Named 2004 Intercollegiate Bowling Championships MVP
- Named first team All-American in 2004-05
- Member of Team USA from 2004 through 2010
- Has won over 20 medals in international competition, including: two gold medals (masters and singles) in the 2007 Pan American games, five total medals in the 2007 American Zone Championships, and four total medals at the 2008 WTBA World Men's Championships
- Won the 2005 U.S. Amateur Championship
- Represented Team USA at the 2008 FIQ Championships in Thailand. (This was the first year that professionals were allowed to participate in the FIQ event.)

== PBA career ==
Page has won six PBA Tour titles, with one major, including one title in each of his first three years on tour. He began the 2007–08 season as a non-exempt bowler, meaning he had to bowl in the Tour Qualifying Round (TQR) every week just to make the starting field of 64 bowlers. He became the third player in PBA history to win a tournament out of the TQR when he won the Go RVing Classic in March, 2008. Along the way, he set a number PBA rookie records, including:

- Most times qualifying for a tournament out of the TQR (12)
- Most match play round appearances for a non-exempt bowler (9)
- Most TV finals appearances when starting from the TQR (5)
- First non-exempt bowler ever to make the TV finals in back-to-back weeks. (The feat was matched in the 2009-10 season by Ryan Ciminelli.)
- Highest rookie season earnings of all time ($84,811)
- Highest 7-game pinfall ever in the TQR (1,883 at the 2007-08 Lumber Liquidators Championship)

Page won his second PBA title the next season at the Lumber Liquidators Shark Championship on December 14, 2008.

Page won the PBA Viper Championship on September 5, 2009 in Allen Park, Michigan, 268–246, over Tour rookie Ryan Ciminelli. This was his third PBA title to date. He finished runner-up in the 2008-09 Tournament of Champions, losing the final match in the 10th frame to friend and Tour roommate Patrick Allen, 267–263. The second ball in that frame left a 1-3-4-7-9-10 washout, costing him the game, even though he converted the washout. Page also won the PBA Experience Showdown in April 2010. This was a non-title special event featuring the five winners of the 2009–10 oil pattern championships.

In the 2009 Dydo Japan Cup, Page defeated one of the top Korean bowlers, Jeong Tae-Hwa, with a score of 300-235, and made history for being the first bowler ever to roll a 300 game in the televised final round of the Japan Cup. It was the 20th televised perfect game overall in PBA Tour history. Although he did not win the tournament, Page earned a $100,000 bonus for the 300 game.

On November 9, 2012 Page was the first player selected by the new PBA League.

After suffering injuries in 2014, appearing in only 11 events that season with little success, Page returned to prominence in the 2015 PBA season, earning the #1 seed in the prestigious Barbasol Tournament of Champions. He was defeated in the final match, however, by reigning TOC champion Jason Belmonte, 232–214. He also made the TV finals for the 2015 PBA World Championship, but was knocked out in the opening match by Scott Norton.

Rhino was a member of the 'Merica Rooster Illusion team, which won the PBA Team Challenge title in Las Vegas on November 1, 2016. This counted as his fourth PBA title. Page was honored as the 2016 PBA Tony Reyes Community Service Award recipient for his charitable work. He has run the Rhino Page "Strike Out Crohn's and Colitis" fund-raiser for the past eight years, raising over $225,000 to fight these debilitating intestinal diseases.

On August 27, 2017, Page won his fifth PBA Tour title, and first singles title in eight years, at the PBA Xtra Frame Kenn-Feld Classic held in Coldwater, Ohio. On November 1, 2017, Rhino won the 2017 U.S. Open for his sixth title and first major championship, defeating top seed Jakob Butturff in the final match.

Page won the 2017 "Best Bowler" ESPY Award in a fan vote conducted by ESPN.

Through June 2019, Page had totaled 15 perfect 300 games in PBA events and had cashed over $725,000 in winnings, with his highest season earnings of $197,760 coming in 2008-09. He also owns nine PBA Regional Tour titles.

As of 2023, Page is semi-retired from the PBA Tour and has not participated in a national event since the PBA League series in 2020.

Page ranked #24 on the PBA's 2025 "Best 25 PBA Players of the Last 25 Seasons" list. The ranking was based on a points system that took into account standard titles, major titles, top-five finishes and Player of the Year awards.

=== PBA Titles ===
Major tournaments are in bold type.

1. 2008: Go RVing Classic (Norwich, CT)
2. 2008: Lumber Liquidators Shark Championship (Baltimore, MD)
3. 2009: PBA Viper Championship (Allen Park, MI)
4. 2016: PBA Team Challenge (w/ E. J. Tackett, Marshall Kent, Chris Loschetter and Ronnie Russell) (Las Vegas, NV)
5. 2017: PBA Xtra Frame Kenn-Feld Group Classic (Coldwater, OH)
6. **2017: U.S. Open** (Liverpool, NY)

== Personal ==
Page grew up in California, where his T-ball coach gave him the nickname "Rhino" for his intensity. He is currently a member of the USBC Board of Directors.

Resides in Montana. Runs Grizzly Lanes in Big Fork, Montana.
