= Juan José Parra =

Colombian footballer (born 2001)

Personal information
- Full name: Juan José Parra Barrientos
- Date of birth: 6 May 2001 (age 25)
- Place of birth: Medellín, Colombia
- Height: 6 ft 3 in (1.90 m)
- Position: Defender

Team information
- Current team: Independiente Medellín

Youth career
- Independiente Medellín

Senior career*
Years	Team	Apps	(Gls)
2020–	Independiente Medellín	2	(0)
2021	→ North Texas SC (loan)	5	(0)
- * Club domestic league appearances and goals as of 29 May 2021

Juan José Parra Barrientos (born 6 May 2001) is a Colombian professional footballer who plays as a defender for Categoría Primera A club Independiente Medellín.

== Career ==
Born in Medellín, Parra began his career with the local club Independiente Medellín, rising up the youth ranks. He made his professional debut for the club on 22 October 2020 in the Copa Libertadores against Libertad, coming on as a 73rd-minute substitute during the 4–2 victory.

=== North Texas SC (loan) ===
On 8 February 2021, Parra joined USL League One club North Texas SC, the reserve club of Major League Soccer club FC Dallas, on loan for the 2021 season. He made his debut for the club on 1 May 2021 against Greenville Triumph, coming on as a halftime substitute in a 0–4 defeat. On 20 July 2021, North Texas and Parra mutually agreed to terminate his loan early.

== Career statistics ==
As of match played 29 May 2021

Appearances and goals by club, season and competition
Club	Season	League			Cup		Continental		Total	
Club	Season	Division	Apps	Goals	Apps	Goals	Apps	Goals	Apps	Goals
Independiente Medellín	2020	Categoría Primera A	2	0	0	0	1	0	3	0
North Texas SC (loan)	2021	USL League One	5	0	—		—		5	0
Career total			7	0	0	0	1	0	8	0
