= Pilar Delgado =

Mexican actress model and dancer

- Born: María del Pilar Delgado Peregrino; March 15, 1966 (age 60); Mexico City, Mexico
- Education: Instituto Nacional de Bellas Artes y Literatura
- Occupations: Actress, model, dancer
- Years active: 1982–present
- Parent: Miguel Delgado Contreras

Pilar Delgado (born María del Pilar Delgado Peregrino on March 15, 1966, in Mexico City, Mexico) is a Mexican actress model and dancer.

Delgado she a daughter of Gynecologist & Obstretician Miguel Delgado Contreras. She attended the INBA (National Institute for Arts) in Mexico, studied classical & contemporary dance. Later, she began her acting career on TV and participated in several sit-coms for Televisa.

== Filmography ==
=== Films ===
- La mafia tiembla (1986)
- Agente 0013: Hermelinda Linda 2 (1986)
- Durazo, la verdadera historia (1988)
- El mil hijos (1989)
- El día de las sirvientas (1989)

=== Television ===
- Las aventuras de Cerebrón y sus amigos (1983)
- Soltero en el aire (1984)
- Salón de belleza (1985)
- Mi secretaria as Pilar (1985)
- Las aventuras de Lenguardo (1985)
- Hospital de la risa as Nurse Pilar (1986)
- Nosotros los Gómez (1988)

=== Theatre ===
- El Don Juan Tenorio (1982-1989)

=== Club nocturno ===
- Show de Luis de Alba
- Show de Pompín Iglesias
- Show de Joaquín García "Borolas"
- Show de Sergio D´Fasio
- Show de Isabel Martínez "La Tarabilla"
