= Lucas Legnani =

Argentine ten-pin bowler

Personal information
- Born: 10 November 1978 (age 47) Buenos Aires, Argentina

Sport
- Sport: Tenpin bowling
Medal record
Representing Argentina
Pan American Games
Bronze medal – third place	2007 Rio de Janeiro	Men's singles

Lucas Legnani (born November 10, 1978, in Buenos Aires, Argentina) is an Argentine ten-pin bowler. He finished in 14th position of the combined rankings at the 2006 AMF World Cup. He was also a bronze medalist at the 2007 Pan American Games in Rio de Janeiro, Brazil.
