= Flor Delgadillo Ruiz =

Colombian cyclist

Flor Marina Delgadillo Ruiz
Personal information
- Born: 12 February 1972 (age 54) Colombia

Cycling career
- Sport: Cycling
- Disciplines: Road cycling Mountain biking
Medal record
Women's road bicycle racing
Representing Colombia
Pan American Championships
Silver medal – second place	2002 Quito	Road race
Bronze medal – third place	2002 Quito	Time trial

Flor Marina Delgadillo Ruiz (born 12 February 1972) is a road cyclist from Colombia. She represented her nation at the 2000 Summer Olympics in the Women's cross-country. She also rode at the 2001 UCI Road World Championships. She became national road race champion in 2000.
