= Blue Cross Park =

Baseball stadium in Winnipeg, Canada

- The Fishbowl
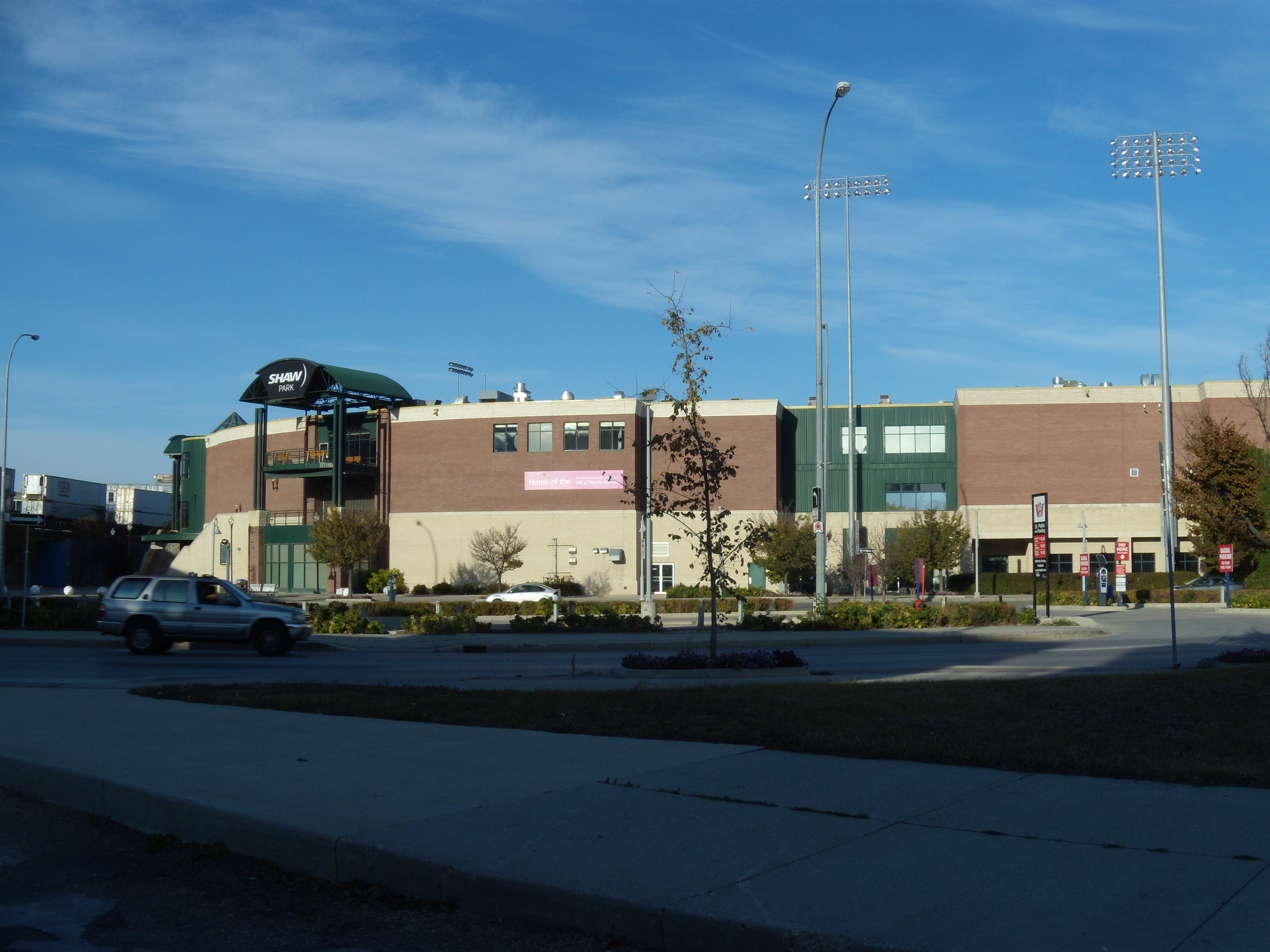

- Location within Manitoba Location within Canada
- Interactive map of Blue Cross Park
- Former names: CanWest Global Park (1999–2008); Canwest Park (2008–2011); Shaw Park (2011–2023)
- Address: One Portage Avenue East; Winnipeg, Manitoba; Canada
- Coordinates: 49°53′37.79″N 97°7′59.93″W
- Owner: Riverside Park Management
- Operator: Winnipeg Goldeyes Baseball Club Inc.
- Capacity: 7,461 (baseball)
- Executive suites: 30
- Type: Stadium
- Events: Sporting events, Music
- Surface: Grass
- Record attendance: 8,668 (August 29, 2005)
- Field size: Left field: 325 ft (99 m); Center field: 400 ft (122 m); Right field: 325 ft (99 m)
- Public transit: Winnipeg Transit; FX4 F7 D12 D13 D16 31

Construction
- Groundbreaking: May 1, 1998
- Built: 1998–99
- Opened: May 24, 1999
- Expanded: 2000, 2003
- Cost: $9 million
- Architects: MMP (architects); Sink Combs Dethlefs (design)
- Builder: The Dominion Company of Winnipeg

Tenants
- Winnipeg Goldeyes (AA) 1999–2019, 2021–present Winnipeg Wesmen (NAIA) 2012–2017

Blue Cross Park (formerly Shaw Park) is a baseball stadium in Winnipeg, Manitoba, Canada. It is located adjacent to The Forks, near the city's downtown, and is home to the Winnipeg Goldeyes of the American Association.

== Features ==
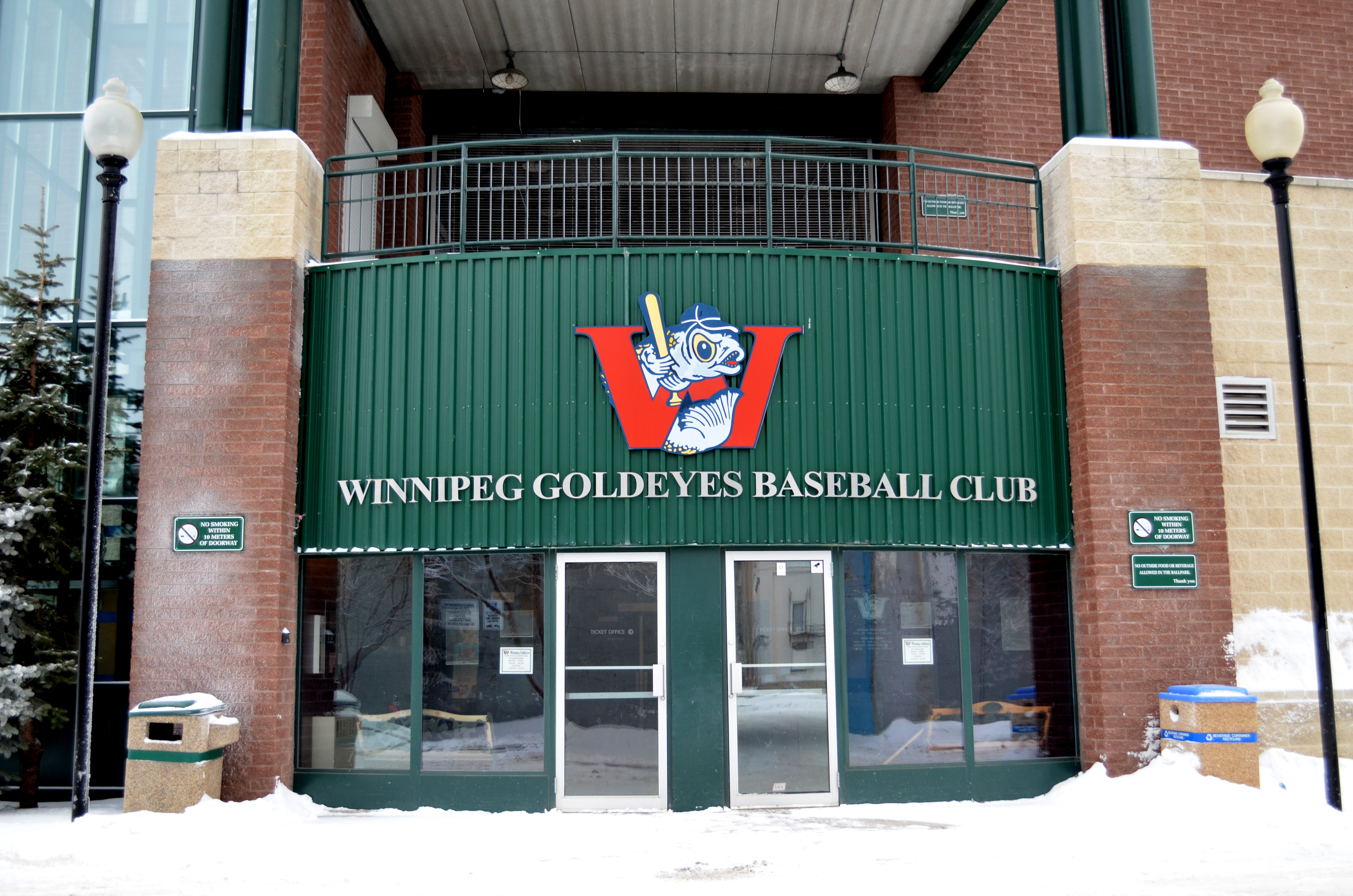
Winnipeg Goldeyes Baseball Club entrance

Blue Cross Park has a seating capacity of 7,461, as well as 30 luxury skysuites, a picnic area, and an open patio overlooking the field from the right field corner. An Indian cuisine restaurant is located on the third floor. A Goldeyes retail store and the baseball club's offices are also located within the ballpark.

The playing field has a natural grass surface and a traditional dirt infield. The outfield dimensions are symmetrical, with distances of 325 feet (99 m) from home plate to each foul pole and 400 feet (120 m) to straightaway centerfield. The Canadian Museum for Human Rights and Esplanade Riel bridge are visible in the distance beyond the outfield fence. The Red River flows northward beyond the left field fence, on the far side of Waterfront Drive. Trains can be frequently seen and heard passing the ballpark, as it is built inside a curve of the main CN Rail line running through downtown Winnipeg.

== History ==
Blue Cross Park, originally named CanWest Global Park, opened on May 24, 1999, replacing Winnipeg Stadium as the home of the Goldeyes and the city's premier baseball facility. It was built in three phases. The first phase saw the stands completed along the third base side to the left field wall and halfway along the first base side, giving the stadium a seating capacity of 6,140. The second phase, completed in 2000, saw the first base stands partially extended, increasing seating capacity to 6,300, and the addition of the skysuites and concession space. The right field stands, patio, and restaurant were completed as part of the final phase in 2003. As part of the final expansion, the City of Winnipeg was required to reroute Pioneer and Water Avenues. A record attendance of 8,668 occurred on August 29 during the 2005 season.

Winnipeg-based CanWest Global purchased the naming rights to the ballpark when it opened in 1999. CanWest Global Park later became Canwest Park after the media company's name change in 2008. Shaw Communications acquired the ballpark's naming rights when it acquired Canwest's broadcasting assets from bankruptcy court in 2010. The ballpark was renamed Shaw Park prior to the 2011 season. The Shaw Park name was retained even though Shaw sold its media division to Corus Entertainment in 2016.

Following the Rogers Communications acquisition of Shaw Communications, the Winnipeg Goldeyes announced a new 10-year naming rights partnership with Manitoba Blue Cross on November 8, 2023, with the ballpark being renamed Blue Cross Park.

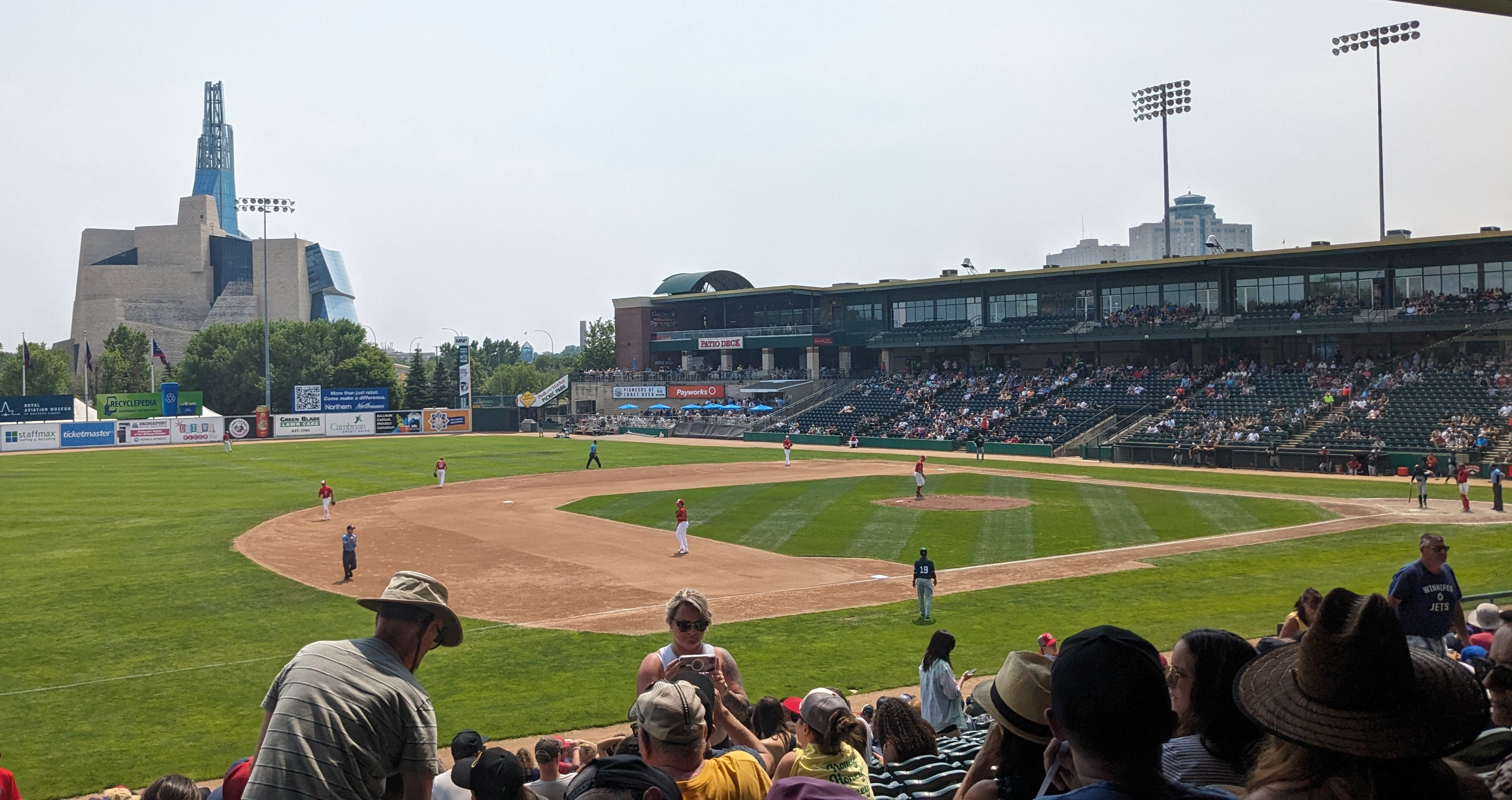
A baseball game between the Winnipeg Goldeyes and Gary SouthShore RailCats held at the venue in 2023

== Major events ==
The ballpark served as the main baseball venue for the 1999 Pan American Games in Winnipeg. The host Canadian squad captured the bronze medal, which was their best finish ever, up to that point. Cuba won the gold medal, defeating the United States in the championship game. A number of future and former Major League players participated, including Mark Mulder, Brad Penny, José Contreras, Craig Paquette, and Adam Kennedy. The baseball tournament was a qualifier for the 2000 Summer Olympics.

Outside of baseball, Blue Cross Park is occasionally used as an outdoor concert venue, having hosted top Canadian musical acts such as The Guess Who and The Tragically Hip.

Events and tenants
Preceded by Winnipeg Stadium	Home of the Winnipeg Goldeyes; 1999 – current	Succeeded by incumbent
Preceded by Yogi Berra Stadium	Host of the NoL All-Star Game; CanWest Global Park; 2001	Succeeded by Stade Municipal
Preceded by Newman Outdoor Field	Host of the NoL All-Star Game; Canwest Park; 2008	Succeeded by Silver Cross Field
Preceded by Lawrence–Dumont Stadium; 2010	Host of the AAB All-Star Game; Shaw Park; 2014	Succeeded by future
