= Winnipeg Stadium =

Stadium in Winnipeg, Manitoba, Canada

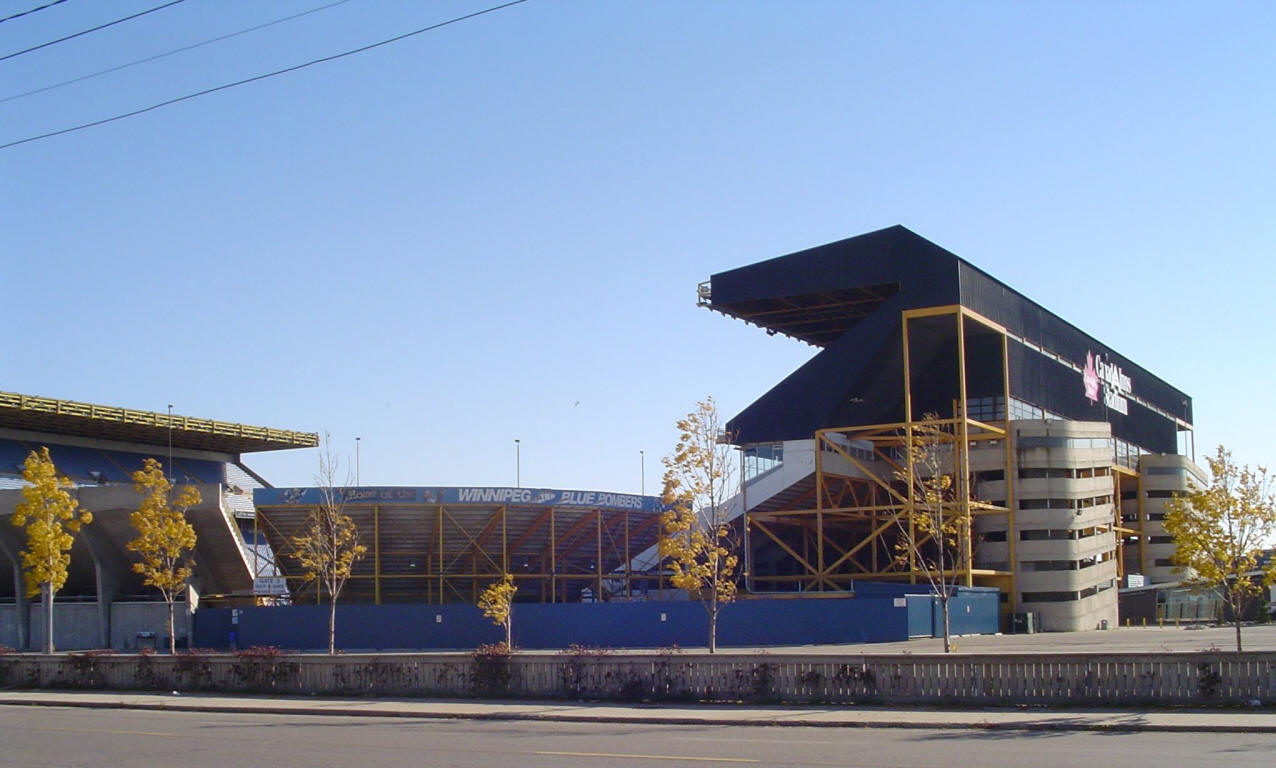
- Interactive map of Winnipeg Stadium
- Location: 1465 Maroons Road; Winnipeg, Manitoba, R3G 0L6
- Coordinates: 49.889570°N 97.198320°W
- Owner: City of Winnipeg
- Operator: Winnipeg Enterprises Corporation; Winnipeg Football Club
- Capacity: Canadian football: 15,700 (1953); 17,995 (1954); 32,946 (1978); 33,675 (1987); 29,533 (1999)
- Surface: Grass (1953–1987); AstroTurf (1988–2002); AstroPlay (2003–2012)
- Record attendance: 51,985 (1991 Grey Cup)

Construction
- Groundbreaking: November 1952
- Opened: August 14, 1953
- Closed: January 3, 2013
- Demolished: April–August 9, 2013
- Cost: $483,000 CAD ($5.66 million in 2025 dollars)
- Architects: Moody and Moore

Tenants
- Winnipeg Blue Bombers (CFL) (1953–2012); Winnipeg Goldeyes (NL) (1953–1964, 1969); Winnipeg Whips (IL) (1970–1971); Winnipeg Fury (CSL) (1987–1992); Winnipeg Goldeyes (NL) (1994–1998); Winnipeg Rifles (CJFL) (2002–2012)

Winnipeg Stadium (also known as Canad Inns Stadium) was a multipurpose stadium in Winnipeg, Manitoba, Canada.

The stadium was located at the corner of St. James Street and Maroons Road, immediately north of the Polo Park Shopping Centre and the now-defunct Winnipeg Arena. Although built for the Canadian Football League's Winnipeg Blue Bombers, the stadium also accommodated baseball and soccer, and was used by various iterations of the Winnipeg Goldeyes and Winnipeg Whips. The stadium was demolished after the Blue Bombers moved to the stadium known then as Investors Group Field in 2013.

== History ==
During the Blue Bombers' early years, the team played at Osborne Stadium, a much smaller venue located near the Manitoba Legislative Buildings. The fast passing-dominated play of Bombers quarterback Jack Jacobs dramatically increased attendance at Blue Bombers games and precipitated the need for a new, larger stadium.

In the wake of several unsuccessful proposals for a new stadium, Winnipeg Enterprises Corporation, a newly created non-profit organization led by Winnipeg Football Club president Culver Riley, presented a plan for the construction of a new 15,700-seat stadium in the Polo Park district. The City of Winnipeg approved the plan in August 1952. Winnipeg Stadium was officially opened on August 14, 1953, with a fundraising gala to benefit the Winnipeg Unit of the Shriners Hospitals for Children. Foster Hewitt served as the master of ceremonies as 12,000 spectators watched an array of Shriners, athletes, politicians, and actress Corinne Calvet inaugurate the stadium. The following night, the Blue Bombers played the first football game at the new stadium against the Ottawa Rough Riders. The stadium became known as "the house that Jack built" in recognition of the contributions of Jack Jacobs.

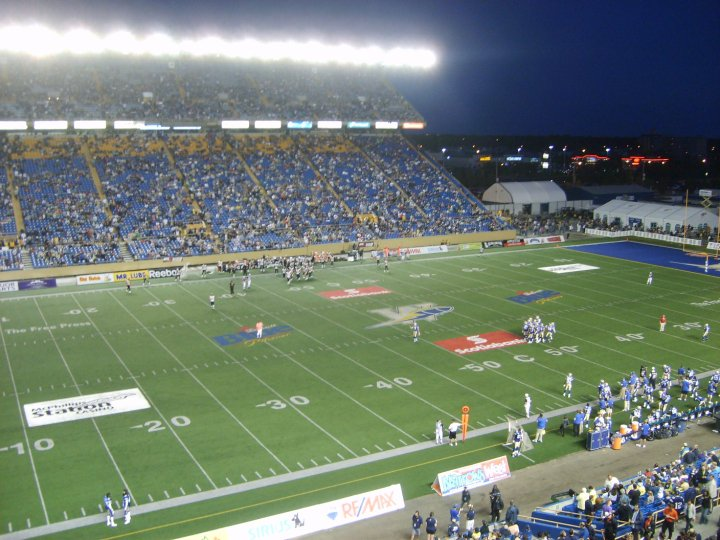
Winnipeg Blue Bombers game at Canad Inns Stadium, August 2010

The on-field success of the Blue Bombers and their growing fan base led to numerous expansions of the facility beginning in 1954, when capacity was raised to 17,995. Of those seats, only 10,166 were on permanent concrete grandstands, with the remainder being temporary seating in the stadium corners. Further additions included the construction of new north end-zone seating in 1966 and expansion of the west side grandstands, including a new upper deck, in 1972. In 1978, the east side grandstands were expanded, with a new upper deck, raising capacity to 32,946. Seats were also added in 1987 when the stadium was configured to accommodate baseball, at which point its capacity peaked at 33,675.

AstroTurf was installed in time for the 1988 season (when it was installed, the Edmonton Eskimos became the last CFL team to have a natural grass surface, but it would switch to a next-generation artificial surface in 2010), which the team welcomed with a Grey Cup victory that year at Lansdowne Park in Ottawa. In 1999, the lower deck benches were replaced by theatre-style seats, the press boxes were enlarged, and a club lounge was added. As a result, seating capacity was reduced to 29,533 and remained that way until the stadium's closure. The artificial turf was replaced by a next-generation AstroPlay surface in 2003.

Winnipeg-based hotel chain Canad Inns acquired the naming rights to Winnipeg Stadium in 2001, after which the facility became known as Canad Inns Stadium. In 2004, Winnipeg Enterprises Corporation was dissolved and operation of the facility was turned over to the Winnipeg Football Club.

== Baseball ==
The original baseball grandstands were built in 1954, at a cost of $184,000, and located in the southwest corner of the complex. The grandstands housed the original incarnation of the Winnipeg Goldeyes and the Winnipeg Whips, the Class AAA affiliate of the Montreal Expos. The grandstands were demolished in the early 1980s to make way for the Blue and Gold Room and, for nearly a decade, baseball could not be accommodated at the stadium.

The stadium once again became a multi-sport venue in the late 1980s. Artificial turf, retractable seats on the east side stands, and new seating behind the home plate area (the northwest corner of the football field) were installed in an effort to attract another professional baseball team to Winnipeg. Although official minor league baseball never returned to the city, the new Winnipeg Goldeyes, an independent team, began play at the stadium in 1994. The Goldeyes played five seasons at the stadium, which included a Northern League championship in 1994 and an independent baseball single-game attendance record of 22,081 set in 1997. The Goldeyes moved into their own ballpark in 1999, which marked the end of baseball at Winnipeg Stadium.

== Major events ==
The stadium hosted the opening ceremonies of both the 1967 and 1999 Pan-American Games. The 1967 Games saw the construction of new north end zone seating. The 1999 Games saw several improvements in preparation for the event, including new seats to replace old benches, additional media and club seating, improved lighting and sound, and a new scoreboard.

The CFL's championship game, the Grey Cup, was held at the stadium in 1991, 1998, and 2006. In each instance, temporary seating was installed to increase the stadium's capacity. The stadium's attendance record for football was set at the 1991 game, when 51,985 fans watched the Toronto Argonauts defeat the Calgary Stampeders. For the 2006 game, temporary seats were erected at the south end of the football field, raising the stadium's capacity to 44,784.

The stadium also hosted numerous outdoor concerts, including big-name acts such as The Rolling Stones, Pink Floyd, David Bowie, Paul McCartney, AC/DC, Bon Jovi, the Eagles and U2. Many outdoor music festivals, such as Festival Express, Edgefest and Rock on the Range, were also held at the stadium.

== Closure ==
Increasing maintenance costs and the accidental death of a fan during a football game in 2006 intensified discussions on the future of Canad Inns Stadium. By 2009, it was estimated that the aging stadium would require over $52 million in upgrades as early as 2012 in order to make it safe and viable for another decade. Faced with the decision on whether to refurbish the old stadium or replace it, the Manitoba government fast-tracked financing for a new stadium. In 2010, Premier Greg Selinger, together with the Winnipeg Football Club and the University of Manitoba, unveiled plans to build a $190 million stadium on the university campus in south Winnipeg in time for the 2012 CFL season, after which Canad Inns Stadium would be demolished.

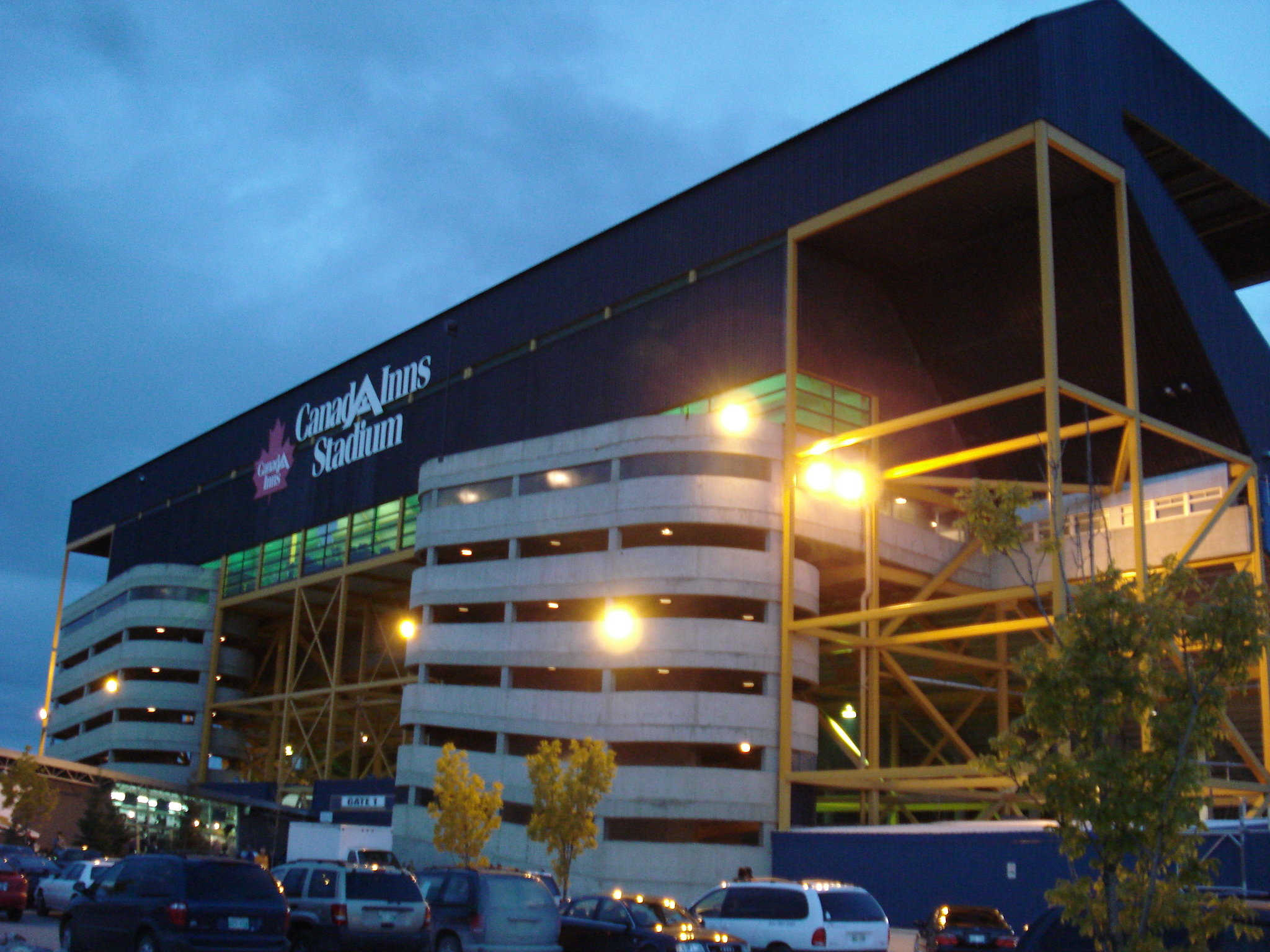
West side stands of Canad Inns Stadium

In anticipation of the scheduled move to Investors Group Field (now Princess Auto Stadium), the Blue Bombers held a special ceremony to close out Canad Inns Stadium prior to their last regular season game of 2011. However, as construction delays at the new stadium pushed back its opening date by several months, the team was forced to return to Canad Inns Stadium for the 2012 season. The Blue Bombers played their final game at the stadium on November 3, 2012, defeating the Montreal Alouettes 19–11. The football club officially closed its offices at Canad Inns Stadium on January 3, 2013.

=== Demolition ===
In June 2012, the city announced the proposed sale of the stadium to Polo Park Holdings Inc, owner of the nearby Polo Park shopping centre, for $30.25 million. The sale was finalized in April 2013 and demolition began soon after. The stadium was dismantled piece-by-piece over a period of four months, beginning with the north end zone and west side grandstands.

Items from the old stadium, including seats, pieces of turf, and other equipment not moved to IG Field, were sold to the public prior to the demolition. Other fixtures, such as stadium benches, were donated to local community clubs and sports teams.

The site is currently being developed into a retail and commercial park known as The Plaza at Polo Park. Demolition of the stadium has also permitted the city to connect two segments of Milt Stegall Drive (formerly Arena Road) which were separated by the stadium.

== See also ==
- List of Canadian Football League stadiums

Events and tenants
Preceded by Osborne Stadium	Home of the Winnipeg Blue Bombers; 1953–2012	Succeeded by IG Field
Preceded by First stadium	Home of the Winnipeg Goldeyes; 1994–1998	Succeeded by CanWest Global Park
Preceded by Estadio José María Minella; Mar del Plata	Pan American Games; Opening and Closing Ceremonies; 1999	Succeeded by Estadio Olímpico Juan Pablo Duarte; Santo Domingo
