= Mike Mullin (bowler) =

American ten-pin bowler

Mike Mullin, of Congers, New York, is an American ten-pin bowler.

In 1992, Mullin shocked the All Time Junior Bowlers Tour with 27 victories, which stood as the record for a few years. That same year, he won the Coca-Cola Junior National Tournament, held in Tucson, Arizona. He attended Don Bosco Prep, where he was Athlete of the Week twice, and won the Triple Crown in his senior year, winning the county, Sectional, and State Tournaments. He won over $18,000 in scholarship money during his junior bowling career, among which included the John Jowdy Scholarship from Columbia 300.

In September 1992, he began college at St. John's University, graduating in 1996. In 1994, he was named the Chuck Hall Star of Tomorrow by the American Bowling Congress (now called the USBC). In May 1995, he won the ACU-I Collegiate Singles Championship at the National Bowling Stadium in Reno, Nevada. In July 1995, he finished in the Top 15 money winners at the High Roller in Las Vegas. In July 1996, he finished in the Top 20 money winners at the High Roller. In October 1995, Mike was asked to join Patrick Allen and Mike Lichstein's Columbia team to compete in the World Team Challenge. They won their first event together, and then in August 1996, the team finished 2nd in the Grand Championships of the World Team Challenge. Also in August 1996, he was part of Junior Team USA and traveled to Hong Kong. There, he competed in the FIQ Youth Games, and won 2 Bronze Medals and a Gold in Team All Events. He was a 3-time Collegiate All American.

In January 1997, Mike was asked to join the Amateur Staff of Columbia 300. In March 1997, his Columbia 300 team won the World Team Challenge in Windsor Locks, Connecticut. In April 1997, he won the Singles and All Events at the Connecticut State Championships. In September 1997, Mike took his first singles competition overseas to the British Open in Nottingham, England. In January 1998, Mike joined the Amateur Staff of Vise Inserts. In February 1998, he traveled to Abu Dhabi, United Arab Emirates to compete in the UAE International Open, where he finished in 16th place.

In May 1998, the ABC Masters held the largest singles event in history, with a field of over 600 bowlers. Mike finished in 4th place, making the CBS TV finals, losing to Parker Bohn III, who rolled a 300, and Chris Sand (248). In June 1998, he traveled to Florida to compete in the Cream of the Crop Tournament in New Port Richey. He won the mixed doubles event with Becky Kregling. Mike averaged over 240 for the 11 games, shooting a 300-game and an 800 series in qualifying. Also in June, his Columbia team won another World Team Challenge Event this time in Staten Island, NY.

He now regularly competes in the Weber Cup.
