= 1999 Pan American Games =

International sports competition

XIII Pan American Games
- Host: Winnipeg, Canada
- Motto: Americas' Fest
- Nations: 42
- Athletes: 5,083
- Events: 330 in 34 sports
- Opening: July 23
- Closing: August 8
- Opened by: Governor General Roméo LeBlanc
- Cauldron lighter: Alwyn Morris; Silken Laumann
- Main venue: Winnipeg Stadium

The 1999 Pan American Games, officially the XIII Pan American Games (French: XIII Jeux panaméricains) or the 13th Pan American Games and commonly known as Winnipeg 1999, were a major international multi-sport event that was held from July 23 to August 8, 1999, in Winnipeg, Manitoba, Canada and surrounding towns and cities. Canoeing competitions started the day before the games officially began. Approximately 5,000 athletes from 42 nations participated in the games to vie for a total of 330 medal events in 34 sports and 42 disciplines.

Financially, the 1999 games were a success, generating a surplus of $8.9 million through a combination of fiscal restraint and the contribution of nearly 20,000 volunteers.

The 1999 Pan American Games were the second Pan American Games hosted by Canada and Winnipeg. Previously, Winnipeg hosted the 1967 Pan American Games.

== Bidding process ==
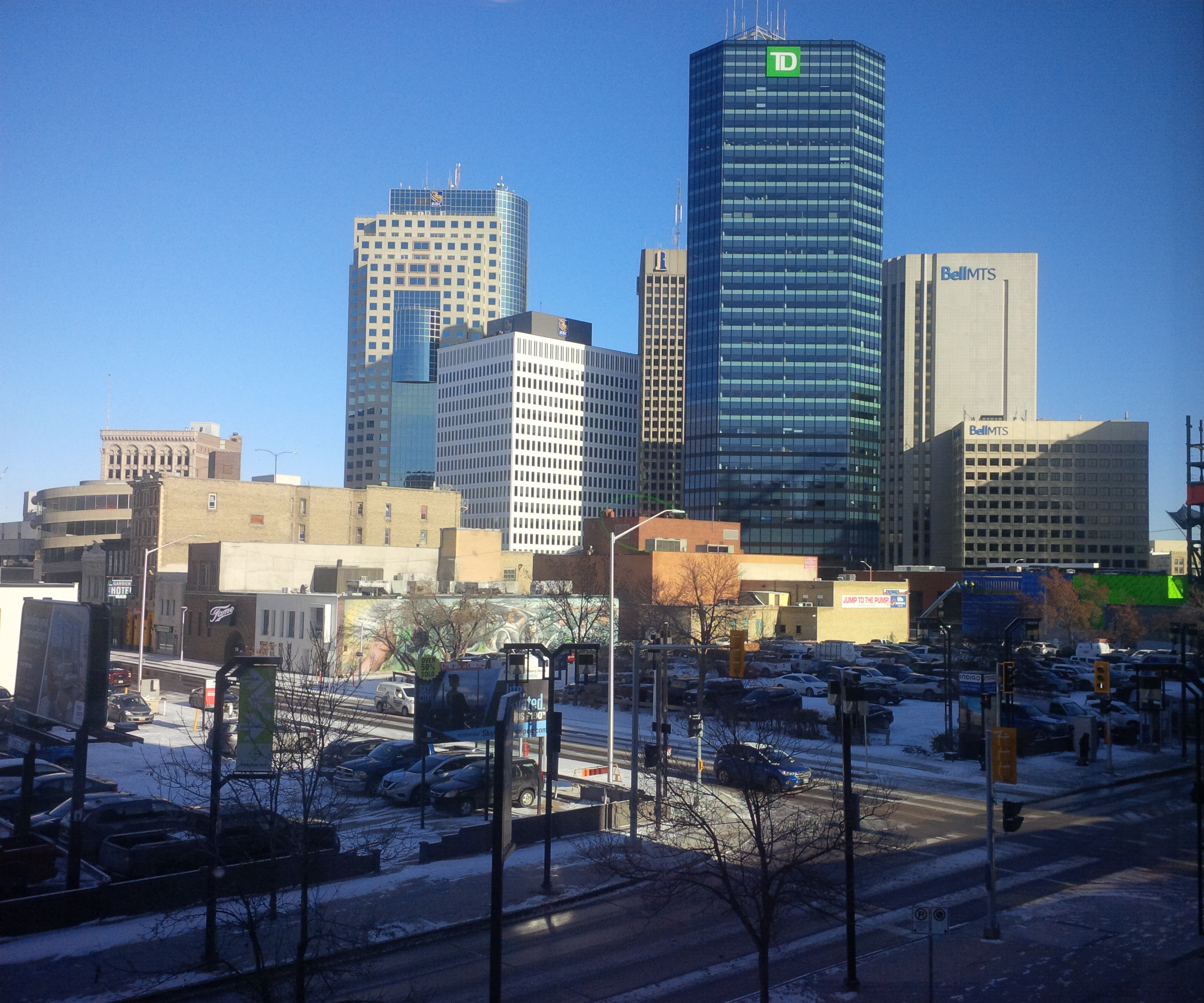
Winnipeg (pictured in 2019) was selected by the Canadian Olympic Association as the official bid city from Canada for the 1999 Pan American Games

Winnipeg beat both Santo Domingo, Dominican Republic, and Bogotá, Colombia in 1994 to win hosting rights for the event.

In 1988, a delegation from Winnipeg announced that once it got approval from the Canadian Olympic Association, the city would submit a bid to host the 1999 Pan American Games. On December 5, 1992, Winnipeg secured the Canadian bidding rights, defeating Toronto by one vote. Other Canadian cities in the running were Halifax, Edmonton, and Sherbrooke. Toronto would later go on to host the 2015 Pan American Games, 16 years later.

Any country that had previously held the games was allotted two votes; those countries were Argentina, Brazil, Mexico, United States, and Venezuela, making 50 votes in total, and a city needed a majority vote (26) to win. Canada and Colombia were not allowed to vote, as they each had a city making a bid.

After the first round of voting, Bogotá was eliminated having the fewest voting with 10 votes. In the second round, Winnipeg and Santo Domingo reached a 25-to-25 tie. Canadian Bidding Committee Co-Chairman Don Mackenzie managed to convince delegates from three National Olympic Committees to change their votes before the tiebreaker round, focusing on the fact that "Santo Domingo had no place for water-skiing, but Portage la Prairie has one of the best water-skiing facilities in Canada." Winnipeg went on to defeat Santo Domingo by a vote of 28 to 22. Santo Domingo later won the rights to the next games in 2003.

1999 Pan American Games bidding results
City	NOC	Round 1	Round 2	Round 3
Winnipeg	Canada	22	25	28
Santo Domingo	Dominican Republic	18	25	22
Bogotá	Colombia	10	—	—

== Development and preparation ==
=== Venues ===
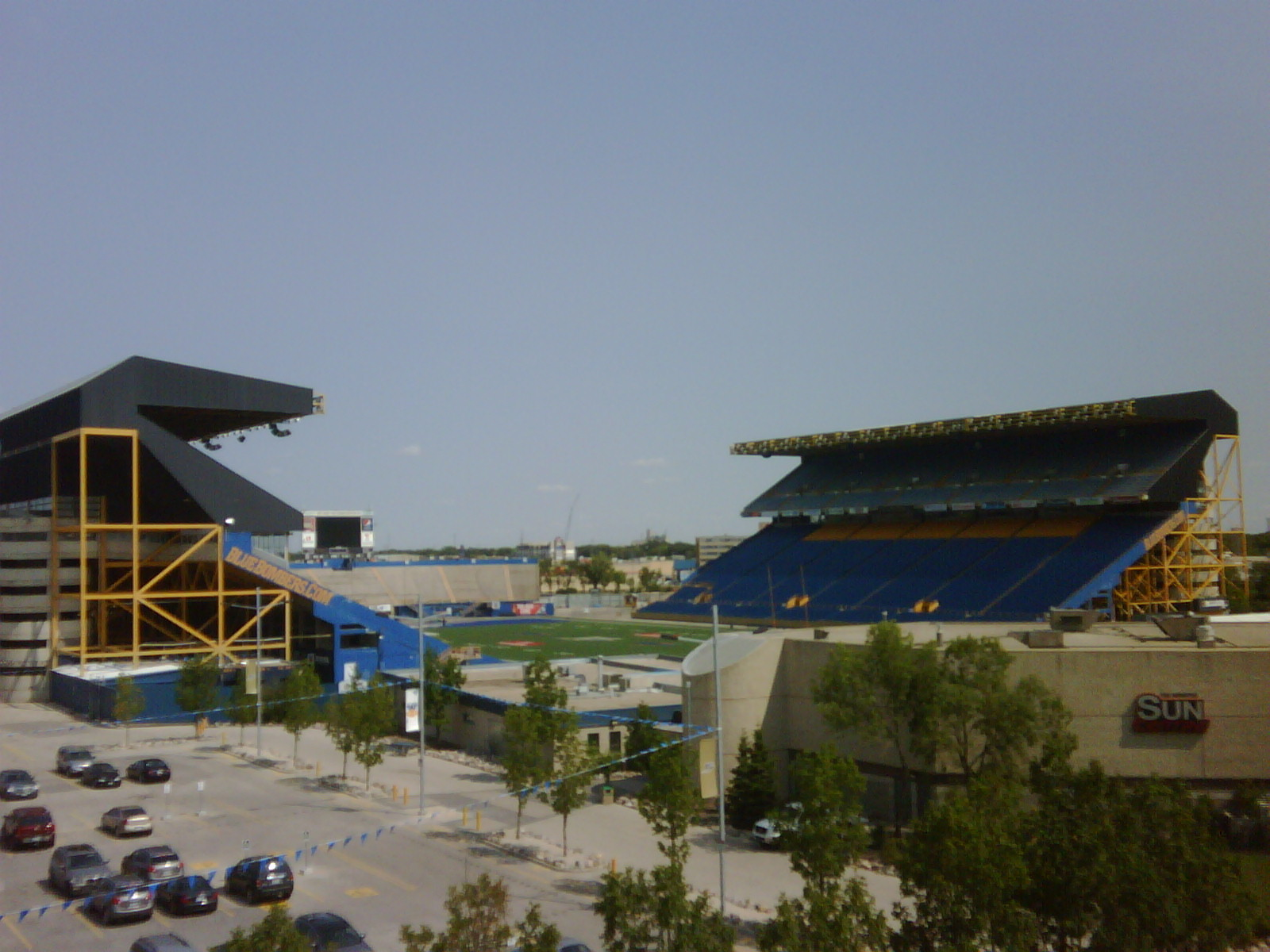
Winnipeg Stadium

A total of 32 sporting venues were used for the games. The Pan Am Pool, built for the 1967 games, featured in the 1999 games for all aquatic events. The venue underwent a $3.3 million renovation for the games. Other new venues included the $8.7 million Investors Group Athletic Centre built for multiple sports and the $12 million CanWest Global Park for the baseball competition.

The main stadium for the games was the Winnipeg Stadium, which staged the ceremonies and the beach volleyball competitions.

A portion of the Pan American Games Society (PANAM'99) budget supported the refurbishment of University of Manitoba residences to serve as the Athletes Village, the upgrade of various sports and training facilities including the Pan Am Stadium (University Stadium), which had hosted events of the 1967 games.

The Winnipeg Velodrome, also built for the 1967 games, had become obsolete and disused for cycling and so was demolished prior to the 1999 games. The cycling venue was a temporary facility at Red River Exhibition Park.

== The Games ==
=== Opening ceremony ===
The opening ceremony of the 1999 Pan American Games took place on Friday July 23, 1999, beginning at 19:30 p.m. CDT and lasted for two hours and forty-five minutes at the Winnipeg Stadium. A crowd of 30,000 spectators attended the ceremony. Seven Aboriginal Canadians, who were denied entrance into the 1967 Pan American Games, also in Winnipeg, this time entered the stadium with the torch while on canoes. Former Olympians Alwyn Morris and Silken Laumann were the final two torchbearers who lit the cauldron. A total of 3,400 performers took part in the ceremony, including the Winnipeg Symphony Orchestra and singer Jeremy Kushnier. Singer Chantal Kreviazuk sang the national anthem, O Canada as part of the ceremony. Governor General Roméo LeBlanc officially opened the games. One of the dignitaries in attendance was Anne, Princess Royal.

=== Participating teams ===
All 42 nations of PASO competed.

A map of all 42 participating nations

- Antigua and Barbuda
- Argentina
- Aruba
- Bahamas
- Barbados
- Belize (3)
- Bermuda
- Bolivia
- Brazil
- British Virgin Islands
- Canada (618)
- Cayman Islands
- Chile
- Colombia
- Costa Rica
- Cuba
- Dominica
- Dominican Republic
- Ecuador
- El Salvador
- Grenada
- Guatemala
- Guyana
- Haiti
- Honduras
- Jamaica
- Mexico
- Netherlands Antilles
- Nicaragua
- Panama
- Paraguay
- Peru
- Puerto Rico
- Saint Lucia
- Saint Kitts and Nevis (1)
- Saint Vincent and the Grenadines
- Suriname
- Trinidad and Tobago
- United States (704)
- Uruguay
- Venezuela
- Virgin Islands

=== Sports ===
330 events in 34 sports were contested. Beach volleyball and inline hockey made their Pan American Games debut. While women's tournaments in football, and water polo were held for the first time.

Numbers in parentheses indicate the number of medal events contested in each sport.

- Aquatics
  - Diving (4)
  - Swimming (32)
  - Synchronized swimming (2)
  - Water polo (2)
- Archery (4)
- Athletics (46)
- Badminton (5)
- Baseball (1)
- Basketball (2)
- Bowling (4)
- Boxing (12)
- Canoeing (12)
- Cycling
  - Mountain biking (2)
  - Road (4)
  - Track (12)
- Equestrian (6)
- Fencing (10)
- Field hockey (2)
- Football (2)
- Gymnastics
  - Artistic (14)
  - Rhythmic (2)
- Handball (2)
- Judo (14)
- Karate (11)
- Modern pentathlon (2)
- Racquetball (4)
- Roller sports
  - Artistic roller skating (4)
  - Inline speed skating (6)
  - Inline hockey (1)
- Rowing (14)
- Sailing (10)
- Shooting (14)
- Softball (2)
- Squash (4)
- Table tennis (4)
- Taekwondo (8)
- Tennis (4)
- Triathlon (2)
- Volleyball
  - Volleyball (2)
  - Beach volleyball (2)
- Water skiing (6)
- Weightlifting (15)
- Wrestling (16)

=== World records set ===
- Weightlifting – 77 kilogram clean & jerk – 202.5 kilograms hoisted by Idalberto Aranda (Cuba)

=== Impact of positive doping results ===
Perhaps the greatest drug scandal in the sport of track and field, since Ben Johnson's disqualification at the 1988 Summer Olympics, occurred here when Javier Sotomayor the current high jump world record holder tested positive for cocaine. A Cuban national hero, his subsequent suspension was fought from the highest levels, with Fidel Castro claiming it was an anti-Cuba conspiracy staged by the United States. Despite a second positive test for cocaine a few months later, Sotomayor eventually had his suspension reduced by a year, just in time to win the silver medal at the 2000 Summer Olympics. A year later he retired, when he faced another positive drug test.

Canada was stripped of its gold medal for inline hockey when the team's goaltender Steve Vézina tested positive for multiple banned substances.

=== Medal count ===
^{1}	Host nation

To sort this table by nation, total medal count, or any other column, click on the icon next to the column title.

Rank	Nation	Gold	Silver	Bronze	Total
1	United States	106	109	80	295
2	Cuba	70	40	47	157
3	Canada ^{1}	64	52	80	196
4	Brazil	25	32	44	101
5	Argentina	25	19	28	72

== Media ==
Lorita (left) and Pato (right), the mascots of the games

The 1999 Games' mascot features two birds named Pato (Wood duck) and Lorita (Parrot).

Television broadcasts of the games were produced by Paul Graham.

== Legacy ==
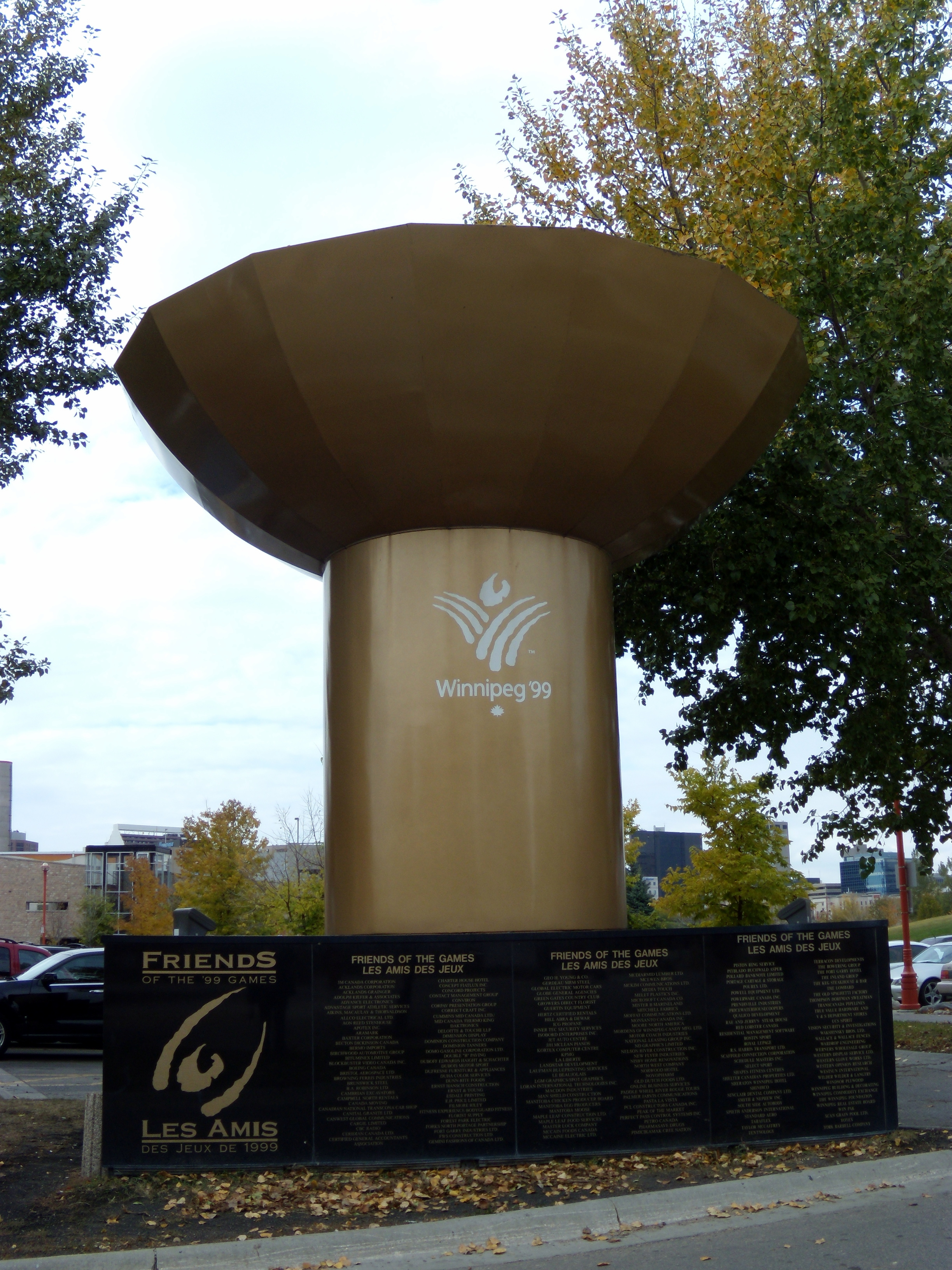
Pan Am Games monument at The Forks, Winnipeg

The 1999 Pan Am games have been "seen by many Winnipeggers as a chance to put their city squarely in the international spotlight". Winnipeg mayor Glen Murray became nationally well known as a result of the Games and thanks to extensive coverage by the CBC, anchored by CBC Sports' Brian Williams. However, the Games themselves only had mixed success, as the Pan Am Games ranked below the Olympics and Commonwealth Games in international prestige. The Games cost $129 million CDN and finished with a financial surplus of $8.8 million CDN.

Hosts Canada celebrated its medal haul, which was the second best after the United States. However, some considered Canada's results overrated, since the U.S. amassed the most medals with a mostly second-string team while Canada and Cuba had fielded their top national athletes. Cuba also managed more golds than Canada, despite having a smaller roster.

Frequent comparisons were made to the 1967 Pan Am Games, also hosted by Winnipeg, where the United States had fielded many rising stars, such as Mark Spitz. By comparison, the Americans had sent their "B" team to the 1999 Games. No major U.S. networks covered the Pan Am Games, except for the Spanish-language network Univisión, while newspapers only sent second-string reporters instead and the stories never made front page news. Many high-profile athletes, of all nationalities, such as U.S. champion sprinters and Brazilian football players, were in Europe during these Pan Am games, taking part in professional events. South American nations (with the exception of Uruguay) did not send their under-23 male soccer teams after the organizing committee refused to pay appearance money to CONMEBOL.

== 1999 Parapan American Games, Mexico City ==
In 1999, the Parapan American Games were not hosted in Winnipeg, but rather in Mexico City. The inaugural event involved 1,000 athletes from 18 countries competing in four sports.

== See also ==
- 2017 Canada Games

Preceded by Mar del Plata	XIII Pan American Games; Winnipeg (1999)	Succeeded by Santo Domingo
