= Uruguay at the 2007 Pan American Games =

- IOC code: URU
- NOC: Uruguayan Olympic Committee
- Website: www.cou.org.uy

in Rio de Janeiro 13–29 July 2007
- Competitors: 173 in 22 sports
- Flag bearer: Andrés Silva
- Medals Ranked 22nd: Gold 0 Silver 1 Bronze 2 Total 3

Pan American Games appearances (overview)
- 1951; 1955; 1959; 1963; 1967; 1971; 1975; 1979; 1983; 1987; 1991; 1995; 1999; 2003; 2007; 2011; 2015; 2019; 2023

The 15th Pan-American Games were held in Rio de Janeiro, Brazil, between 13 July 2007 and 29 July 2007.

== Medals ==
=== Silver ===
===== Sailing =====
- Men's Snipe Class: Pablo Defazio and Eduardo Medici

=== Bronze ===
===== Basketball =====
- Men's Team Competition: Uruguay national basketball team

===== Cycling =====
- Men's Points Race: Milton Wynants

== Competitors by event ==
=== Athletics ===
- Andrés Silva
- Heber Viera
- Stefanía Zoryez
- Déborah Gyurcsek

=== Basketball ===
==== Men's team competition ====
- Preliminary Round (Group B)

- Defeated United States (72-81)
- Lost to Argentina (69-71)
- Defeated Panama (76-68)

- Semi Finals

- Lost to Brazil (73-85)

- Bronze Medal Match

- Defeated Argentina (99-93) → Bronze Medal

- Team Roster

- Emiliano Taboada
- Mauricio Aguiar
- Leandro García
- Esteban Batista
- Gastón Paez
- Nicolás Mazzarino
- Fernando Martínez
- Panchi Barrera
- Claudio Charquero
- Martín Osimani
- Juan Pablo Silveira
- Sebastián Izaguirre

=== Beach Volleyball ===
- Fabio Dalmás and Nicolás Zanotta
- Mariana Guerrero and Karina Cardozo

=== Canoeing ===
- Marcelo D'Ambrosio
- Christian Vergara
- Guillermo Giorgi

=== Cycling ===
- Milton Wynants
- Luis Morales
- Alen Reyes
- Fabiana Granizal

=== Equestrian ===
- Ricardo Monge
- Julio Álvarez
- Edison Quintana

=== Field Hockey ===
==== Women's team competition ====
- Andrea Fazzio
- Carolina Mutilva
- Bettiana Ceretta
- Anna Karina Bissignano
- Patricia Bueno
- Mariana Ríos
- Virginia Casabó
- Eleonora Rebollo
- Carolina Gibernau
- Patricia Campos
- Alessandra Rasso
- Verónica Dupont
- Virginia Bessio
- Sofía Sanguinetti
- Mercedes Lerena
- María Algorta

=== Football ===
==== Women's team competition ====
- Luciana Gómez
- Stefanía Maggiolini
- Tamy Gares
- Carla Arrua
- Aída Camaño
- Guillermina Rodríguez
- Alejandra Laborda
- Paula Viera
- Angélica Souza
- Juliana Castro
- Sindy Ramírez
- Lorena López
- Gabriela Paiva
- Laura Far
- Carla Quinteros
- Inés Rusch
- Natalia González
- Mayra Padrón

=== Gymnastics ===
- Romina Moccia

=== Handball ===
==== Men's team competition ====
- Gonzalo Gamba
- Carlos Pintos
- Nicolás Orlando
- Hernann Wenzel
- Maximiliano Gratadoux
- Pablo Poggio
- Maximiliano Malfatti
- Rodrigo Bernal
- Sebastián Noveri
- Pablo Caro
- Nicolás Fabra
- Gabriel Spangenberg
- Pablo Marrochi
- Luis Eduardo Suberbielle
- Pablo Montes

=== Judo ===
- Javier Terra

=== Karate ===
- Manuel Costa

=== Modern Pentathlon ===
- Luis Siri
- Luis Benavides

=== Rowing ===
- Rodolfo Collazo
- Angel García
- Jhonatan Esquivel
- Emiliano Dumestre
- Emmanuel Bouvier
- Danilo Frangi
- Joe Reboledo

=== Sailing ===
- Santiago Silveira
- Nicolás Shabán
- Alejandro Foglia
- Pablo Defazio
- Eduardo Medici
- Sebastián Raña

=== Shooting ===
- Carolina Lozado
- Diana Cabrera
- Luis Méndez
- Jorge García

=== Skating ===
- María Cecilia Laurino
- Maximiliano García

=== Swimming ===
- Paul Kutscher
- Martín Kutscher
- Francisco Picasso
- Gabriel Melconian
- Daniel Queipo
- Antonella Scanavino
- Elsa Pumar
- Andrea Guerra
- Inés Remersaro

=== Taekwondo ===
- Mayko Votta

=== Tennis ===
- Marcel Felder
- Federico Sansonetti
- Estefanía Cracium
- María Arechavaleta

=== Triathlon ===
==== Men's Competition ====
- Guillermo Nantes

- 2:04:16.84 — 28th place

==== Women's Competition ====
- Virginia López

- 2:15:18.67 — 25th place

=== Weightlifting ===
- Mauricio de Marino
- Edward Silva

== See also ==
- Sport in Uruguay
- Uruguay at the 2008 Summer Olympics
