= Uruguay at the 2027 Pan American Games =

- IOC code: URU
- NOC: Uruguayan Olympic Committee

in Lima, Peru 2027 – 2027
- Competitors: 51 in 5 sports
- Medals: Gold 0 Silver 0 Bronze 0 Total 0

Pan American Games appearances (overview)
- 1951; 1955; 1959; 1963; 1967; 1971; 1975; 1979; 1983; 1987; 1991; 1995; 1999; 2003; 2007; 2011; 2015; 2019; 2023; 2027

Uruguay is scheduled to compete at the 2027 Pan American Games in Lima, Peru from July 23 to August 8, 2027. This will be Uruguay's 20th appearance at the Pan American Games, having competed at every edition of the games since the inaugural edition in 1951.

== Competitors ==
The following is the list of number of competitors participating at the games per sport/discipline.

Sport	Men	Women	Total
Equestrian			2
Field hockey	0	16	16
Football	0	18	18
Rugby sevens	12	0	12
Sailing	2	1	3
Total	14	35	51

== Equestrian ==
Uruguay qualified two equestrians (one in Eventing and one in Jumping) at the 2026 South American Games.

=== Eventing ===
Athlete	Horse	Event	Dressage		Cross-country			Jumping			Total	
Athlete	Horse	Event	Result	Rank	Penalties	Total	Rank	Penalties	Total	Rank	Penalties	Rank
		Individual										

=== Jumping ===
Athlete	Horse	Event	Qualification											Final							
Athlete	Horse	Event	Round 1			Round 2.1			Round 2.2			Total		Round A			Round B			Total	
Athlete	Horse	Event	Faults	Result Time	Rank	Faults	Result Time	Rank	Faults	Result Time	Rank	Faults	Rank	Faults	Result Time	Rank	Faults	Result Time	Rank	Faults	Rank
		Individual																			

== Field hockey ==
Uruguay qualified a women's team as one of the two best countries not yet qualified in the Field Hockey World Ranking of September 30, 2026.

Summary

Team	Event	Group stage				Semifinal	Final / BM / Pl.	
Team	Event	Opposition Result	Opposition Result	Opposition Result	Rank	Opposition Result	Opposition Result	Rank
Uruguay women	Women's tournament							

== Football ==
Uruguay qualified a women's team after finishing 4th at the 2025 Copa America Femenina.

Summary

Key:

- A.E.T – After extra time.
- P – Match decided by penalty-shootout.

Team	Event	Group Stage				Semifinal	Final / BM	
Team	Event	Opposition Score	Opposition Score	Opposition Score	Rank	Opposition Score	Opposition Score	Rank
Uruguay women's	Women's tournament							

== Rugby sevens ==
Uruguay qualified a men's team (of 12 athletes) after winning the bronze medal at the 2026 Sudamérica Rugby Sevens.

Summary

Team	Event	Group stage				Semifinal	Final / BM / Pl.	
Team	Event	Opposition Result	Opposition Result	Opposition Result	Rank	Opposition Result	Opposition Result	Rank
Uruguay men	Men's tournament							

== Sailing ==
Uruguay qualified 2 boats for a total of 3 sailors.

Men

Athlete	Event	Opening series																		Finals				
Athlete	Event	1	2	3	4	5	6	7	8	9	10	11	12	13	14	15	16	Points	Rank	QF	SF	M / F	Points	Rank
	49er													—N/a						—N/a				
	Women's IQFoil																							
