= Uruguay at the 1999 Pan American Games =

- IOC code: URU
- NOC: Uruguayan Olympic Committee
- Website: www.cou.org.uy

in Winnipeg 23 July – 8 August 1999
- Competitors: 123 in 21 sports
- Medals Ranked 20th: Gold 0 Silver 1 Bronze 3 Total 4

Pan American Games appearances (overview)
- 1951; 1955; 1959; 1963; 1967; 1971; 1975; 1979; 1983; 1987; 1991; 1995; 1999; 2003; 2007; 2011; 2015; 2019; 2023; 2027

The 13th Pan American Games were held in Winnipeg, Manitoba, Canada from July 23 to August 8, 1999.

== Medals ==
=== Silver ===
===== Roller sports =====
- Mixed Team: Karina Rocha and Germán Alves

=== Bronze ===
===== Athletics =====
- Women's Pole Vault: Déborah Gyurcsek

===== Cycling =====
- Men's Points Race: Milton Wynants

===== Karate =====
- Men's Kumite (+ 80 kg): Manuel Costa

== Results by event ==
=== Athletics ===
- Néstor García
- Heber Viera
- Cristian Rosales
- Danielo Estefan
- Mónica Falcioni
- Déborah Gyurcsek

=== Basketball ===
==== Men's team competition ====
- Team roster

- Adrián Bertolini
- Marcel Bouzout
- Bruno Abratansky
- Jorge Cabrera
- Diego Castrillón
- Diego Losada
- Nicolás Mazzarino
- Oscar Moglia Jr.
- Pablo Morales
- Luis Silveira
- Martín Suárez
- Hugo Vázquez

- Head coach: César Somma

=== Canoeing ===
- Marcelo d'Ambrosio

=== Cycling ===
- Gregorio Bare
- Tomas Margaleff
- Federico Moreira
- Milton Wynants

=== Equestrian ===
- Jorge Fernández
- Edison Quintana
- Pablo Núñez
- Federico Daners
- Federico Fernández
- Fernando Amado
- Hugo Garciacelay
- Ricardo Monge

=== Fencing ===
- Daniel Olivera
- Pablo Odella
- Florencia Navatta
- María Victoria Díaz

=== Football ===
Uruguay participated with an under-23 selection of amateur players of OFI.

==== Men's team competition ====
- Team roster

- Martín Góngora
- Mauro Basualdo
- Williams Airala
- Mario Pascale
- Marcos Shur
- Fernando Daghero
- Luis Maseda
- Richar Albin
- Rafael Muniz
- Sergio González
- William da Costa
- Julio Pablo Rodríguez
- Jorge Reyna
- Ruben Morán
- Andrés Larre Pérez
- Jorge Rodríguez
- Carlos González
- Mariano Bogliacino

- Head coach: Luis Matosas

=== Gymnastics ===
- María del Carmen Laurino
- Rossina Castelli
- Eugenia Tambler

=== Handball ===
==== Men's team competition ====
- Team roster

- Sebastián Bolla
- Daniel Schneider
- Maximiliano Gratadoux
- Pablo Montes
- Luis Pelloni
- Gonzalo Gómez
- Martín Montemurro
- Christian Van Rompaey
- Ignacio Mahia
- Gastón Balleto
- Mauricio Sapiro
- Joaquín Santoro
- Gonzalo Graña

==== Women's team competition ====
- Team roster

- Silvana Renom
- Luciana Restuccia
- María José del Campo
- Daniela Fuentes
- María del Campo
- Mercedes Amor
- Haloy Yaicouschi
- Jussara Castro
- María Crocci
- Silvana de Armas
- Sofía Griot
- Lorena Estefanell
- Lucía Curbelo

=== Judo ===
- Milton Terra
- Álvaro Paseyro

=== Karate ===
- Manuel Costa
- Pablo Layerla
- Jony Martínez
- Paola Loitey

=== Roller Sports ===
- Karina Rocha
- Germán Alves
- Ana Claudia Ibarra

=== Rowing ===
- Martín Pesce
- Jesús Posse
- Martín Simoncelli
- Ruben Scarpatti
- Pablo Gutiérrez

=== Sailing ===
- Adolfo Carrau
- Ricardo Fabini
- Roberto Fabini
- Ignacio Saralegui

=== Shooting ===
- Luis Méndez
- Roberto Fandiño
- Luis Pérez

=== Swimming ===
- Claudia Campiño
- Elena Casal
- Diego Gallo
- Francisco Picasso

=== Tennis ===
- Enrique Dondo
- Gonzalo Rodríguez

=== Triathlon ===
- Bruno Nantes

=== Weightlifting ===
- Sergio Lafuente
- Edward Silva

=== Wrestling ===
- William Fernández

== See also ==
- Sport in Uruguay
- Uruguay at the 2000 Summer Olympics
