= Uruguay at the 2003 Pan American Games =

- IOC code: URU
- NOC: Uruguayan Olympic Committee
- Website: cou.org.uy

in Santo Domingo 1–17 August 2003
- Medals Ranked 18th: Gold 2 Silver 1 Bronze 5 Total 8

Pan American Games appearances (overview)
- 1951; 1955; 1959; 1963; 1967; 1971; 1975; 1979; 1983; 1987; 1991; 1995; 1999; 2003; 2007; 2011; 2015; 2019; 2023; 2027

The 14th Pan American Games were held in Santo Domingo, Dominican Republic from August 1 to August 17, 2003.

== Medalists ==
The following competitors from Uruguay won medals at the games. In the by discipline sections below, medalists' names are bolded.

Medal	Name	Sport	Event	Date
Gold	Milton Wynants	Cycling	Men's road race	
Gold	Milton Wynants	Cycling	Men's points race	

=== Bronze ===
===== Canoeing =====
- Men's C-1 1000 m: Darwin Correa

===== Handball =====
- Women's Team Competition: Uruguay women's national handball team

- Mercedes Amor, Silvana de Armas, Jussara Castro, Verónica Castro, Lorena Estefanell, Mariana Fleitas, N'Haloy Laicouschi, Victoria Graña, Sofía Griot, Florencia Polcaro, Ivanna Scavino, Marcela Schelotto, Cecilia Schwedt, María Inés Terragno, and María Noel Uriarte

== Results by event ==
=== Swimming ===
==== Men's Competition ====
Athlete	Event	Heat		Final	
Athlete	Event	Time	Rank	Time	Rank
Francisco Picasso	50 m freestyle	23.70	14	23.69	15
Paul Kutscher	50 m freestyle	23.72	16	did not advance	
Francisco Picasso	100 m freestyle	52.17	19	52.14	16
Paul Kutscher	100 m freestyle	51.37	11	51.48	9
Paul Kutscher	200 m freestyle	1:55.60	15	1:56.05	15

=== Triathlon ===
Athlete	Event	Race			Total	
Athlete	Event	Swim	Bike	Run	Time	Rank
Guillermo Nantes	Men's Individual	21:37.100	1:01:27.300	44:07.900	02:08:04	28

== See also ==
- Sport in Uruguay
- Uruguay at the 2004 Summer Olympics
