= Uruguay at the 2019 Pan American Games =

- IOC code: URU
- NOC: Uruguayan Olympic Committee

in Lima, Peru 26 July–11 August 2019
- Competitors: 147 in 12 sports
- Flag bearer: Julieta Mautone (opening)
- Medals: Gold 0 Silver 4 Bronze 4 Total 8

Pan American Games appearances (overview)
- 1951; 1955; 1959; 1963; 1967; 1971; 1975; 1979; 1983; 1987; 1991; 1995; 1999; 2003; 2007; 2011; 2015; 2019; 2023; 2027

Uruguay competed in the 2019 Pan American Games in Lima, Peru from July 26 to August 11, 2019.

On July 1, 2019, sport shooter Julieta Mautone was named as the country's flag bearer during the opening ceremony.

The Uruguayan team consisted of 147 (104 men and 43 women) athletes.

== Competitors ==
The following is the list of number of competitors (per gender) participating at the games per sport/discipline.

Sport	Men	Women	Total
Athletics	4	3	7
Basketball	12	4	16
Basque pelota	4	2	6
Bodybuilding	1	1	2
Boxing	1	0	1
Canoeing	4	0	4
Cycling	1	1	2
Equestrian	8	2	10
Field hockey	0	16	16
Football	18	0	18
Golf	2	2	4
Gymnastics	1	1	2
Judo	1	0	1
Karate	2	0	2
Modern pentathlon	2	1	3
Roller sports	0	1	1
Rowing	9	1	10
Rugby sevens	12	0	12
Sailing	6	3	9
Shooting	4	1	5
Surfing	2	0	2
Swimming	2	3	5
Taekwondo	1	0	1
Tennis	2	0	2
Triathlon	1	0	1
Volleyball	2	0	2
Weightlifting	2	1	3
Total	104	43	147

== Medalists ==
Medal	Name	Sport	Event
Silver	Jimena Miranda; Camila Naviliat	Basque Pelota	
Silver	Julian Schweizer	Surfing	Longboard
Silver	Nicolás Landauer	Sailing	Kites
Silver	Ricardo Fabini; Florencia Parnizari	Sailing	Snipe
Bronze	Lucas Fernández	Boxing	Men's 56 kg
Bronze	Emiliano Lasa	Athletics	Long jump
Bronze	Déborah Rodríguez	Athletics	800 m
Bronze	Maximiliano Larrosa	Karate	Final Kumite - 60 kg

Medals by sport
Sport	1st place, gold medalist(s)	2nd place, silver medalist(s)	3rd place, bronze medalist(s)	Total
Sailing	0	2	0	2
Basque pelota	0	1	0	1
Surfing	0	1	0	1
Athletics	0	0	2	2
Boxing	0	0	1	1
Karate	0	0	1	1
Total	0	4	4	8

Medals by day
Day	Date	1st place, gold medalist(s)	2nd place, silver medalist(s)	3rd place, bronze medalist(s)	Total
1	July 27	0	0	0	0
2	July 28	0	0	0	0
3	July 29	0	0	0	0
4	July 30	0	0	0	0
5	July 31	0	0	0	0
6	August 1	0	0	0	0
7	August 2	0	0	1	1
8	August 3	0	0	0	0
9	August 4	0	1	0	1
10	August 5	0	0	0	0
11	August 6	0	0	0	0
12	August 7	0	0	1	1
13	August 8	0	0	0	0
14	August 9	0	1	0	1
15	August 10	0	2	1	3
16	August 11	0	0	1	1
Total		0	4	4	8

Medals by gender
Gender	1st place, gold medalist(s)	2nd place, silver medalist(s)	3rd place, bronze medalist(s)	Total
Women	0	1	1	2
Men	0	2	3	5
Mixed	0	1	0	1
Total	0	4	4	8

== Athletics ==
Track & road events

Athlete	Event	Semifinal		Final	
Athlete	Event	Time	Rank	Time	Rank
Déborah Rodríguez	Women's 800 metres	2:06.30	9 Q	2:01.66	3rd place, bronze medalist(s)
Santiago Catrofe	Men's 1500 metres	—N/a		3:43.17	4
Eduardo Gregorio	Men's 1500 metres	—N/a		3:49.66	13
María Pía Fernández	Women's 1500 metres	—N/a		4:10.93	5
Nicolás Cuestas	Men's marathon	—N/a		2:13:59	7

Field events

Athlete	Event	Result	Rank
Emiliano Lasa	Men's long jump	7.87	3rd place, bronze medalist(s)
Lorena Aires	Women's high jump	1.74	10

== Basketball ==
=== 5 × 5 ===
Summary

Team	Event	Preliminary round				Semifinal	Final / BM / Pl.	
Team	Event	Opposition Result	Opposition Result	Opposition Result	Rank	Opposition Result	Opposition Result	Rank
Uruguay men	Men's tournament	Argentina; L 65-102	Mexico w72-61	Dominican Republic; L 57-83	3	Did not advance	Uruguay; L 68-78	6

==== Men's tournament ====
Preliminary round

Team	Pld	W	L	PF	PA	PD	Pts	Qualification
Argentina	3	2	1	268	234	+34	5	Qualified for the Semifinals
Dominican Republic	3	2	1	245	220	+25	5	Qualified for the Semifinals
Uruguay	3	1	2	194	246	−52	4	
Mexico	3	1	2	194	201	−7	4	

31 July 2019
18:00

Report

Argentina	102–65	Uruguay
Scoring by quarter: 27–2, 24–15, 22–27, 29–21
Pts: Deck 23; Rebs: Scola 8 Asts: Scola 4		Pts: Parodi 11; Rebs: Four players 3 Asts: Parodi, Rodríguez, Wachsmann 2

Coliseo Eduardo Dibos, Lima
Referees: Steven Anderson (USA)

1 August 2019
18:00

Report

Mexico	61–72	Uruguay
Scoring by quarter: 12–19, 12–11, 22–14, 15–28
Pts: Zesati 19; Rebs: Zesati 6 Asts: Estrada 2		Pts: Rojas 19; Rebs: Rojas 5 Asts: Parodi 4

Coliseo Eduardo Dibos, Lima
Referees: Michael Weiland (CAN)

2 August 2019
10:30

Report

Uruguay	57–83	Dominican Republic
Scoring by quarter: 19–15, 12–20, 12–19, 14–29
Pts: Four players 9 Rebs: Wachsmann 13; Asts: Parodi 5		Pts: Figueroa 16; Rebs: Rojas, Vargas 5 Asts: Solano 9

Coliseo Eduardo Dibos, Lima
Referees: Jorge Vazquez (PUR)

Fifth place match

3 August 2019
13:30

Report

Venezuela	78–68	Uruguay
Scoring by quarter: 19–25, 17–12, 23–22, 19–9
Pts: Zamora 15; Rebs: Graterol 7 Asts: Guillent 3		Pts: Rojas 17; Rebs: Wachsmann 7 Asts: Parodi 3

Coliseo Eduardo Dibos, Lima
Referees: Jorge Vazquez (PUR)

=== 3 × 3 ===
Summary

Team	Event	Preliminary round						Semifinal	Final / BM / Pl.	
Team	Event	Opposition Result	Opposition Result	Opposition Result	Opposition Result	Opposition Result	Rank	Opposition Result	Opposition Result	Rank
Uruguay women	Women's tournament	Venezuela; L 8-14	United States; L 5-21	Argentina; L 13-19	Dominican Republic; L 13-17	Argentina; L 16-20	5	Did not advance	Venezuela; L 11-21	5

==== Women's tournament ====
Preliminary round

Pos	Team	Pld	W	L	PF	PA	PD	Qualification
1	United States	5	5	0	102	48	+54	Semifinals
2	Argentina	5	4	1	76	68	+8	Semifinals
3	Dominican Republic	5	3	2	68	73	−5	Semifinals
4	Brazil	5	2	3	76	89	−13	Semifinals
5	Venezuela	5	1	4	72	80	−8	Fifth place match
6	Uruguay	5	0	5	55	91	−36	Fifth place match

Source: Lima 2019
Rules for classification: 1) Wins; 2) Head-to-head record; 3) Points scored.

27 July 2019
15:00

Report

Venezuela	14–8	Uruguay
Pts: Wallen, Pérez 5		Pts: Gayoso 3

Coliseo Eduardo Dibos
Referees: Glenn Tuitt (USA) / Carolina Zachi (BRA)

27 July 2019
18:00

Report

Uruguay	5–21	United States
Pts: Gayoso 5		Pts: Hebard 7

Coliseo Eduardo Dibos
Referees: Kayla Herdman (CAN) / Sonia Maldonado (PUR)

27 July 2019
21:30

Report

Argentina	19–13	Uruguay
Pts: Llorente 10		Pts: Gayoso 8

Coliseo Eduardo Dibos
Referees: Kayla Herdman (CAN) / Carolina Zachi (BRA)

28 July 2019
16:00

Report

Dominican Republic	17–13	Uruguay
Pts: Reynoso 9		Pts: Dolinsky 6

Coliseo Eduardo Dibos
Referees: Sonia Maldonado (PUR) / Glenn Tuitt (USA)

28 July 2019
20:00

Report

Uruguay	16–20	Brazil
Pts: Gayoso 10		Pts: Silva 7

Coliseo Eduardo Dibos
Referees: Sonia Maldonado (PUR) / Ángel Martínez (PUR)

Fifth place match

29 July 2019
11:00

Report

Venezuela	21–11	Uruguay
Pts: Márquez 8		Pts: Gayoso 9

Coliseo Eduardo Dibos
Referees: Sonia Maldonado (PUR) / Carolina Zachi (BRA)

== Basque pelota ==
Men

Athlete	Event	Preliminary round					Semifinal	Final	
Athlete	Event	Opposition Result	Opposition Result	Opposition Result	Opposition Result	Rank	Opposition Result	Opposition Result	Rank
Braian Ramirez Mesa	Men's individual fronton rubber ball	Tejeda (USA); W 2–0	Rodriguez (MEX); L 0–2	Fernandez (GUA); W 2–0	Vera (VEN); W 2–0	2 Q	Andreasen (ARG); L 0–2	González (CUB); L 0–2	4
Aparicio Guichón; Lucas Rivas	Men's doubles trinquete rubber ball	Domínguez - Romero (CHI); L 1–2	García - Pérez (MEX); L 0–2	Andreasen - Andreasen (ARG); L 0–2	Bellido - Velásquez (PER); W 2–0	4 Q	—N/a	Domínguez - Romero (CHI); L 0–2	4
Richard Airala	Individual hand fronton	Alvarez (MEX); L 0–2	Otheguy (BRA); L 1–2	—N/a		3	Did not advance		

Women

Athlete	Event	Preliminary round					Semifinal	Final	
Athlete	Event	Opposition Result	Opposition Result	Opposition Result	Opposition Result	Rank	Opposition Result	Opposition Result	Rank
María Miranda; Camila Naviliat	Women's doubles trinquete rubber ball	Castillo - Flores Buendia (MEX); W 2–0	Paredes - Rodríguez (PER); W 2–0	—N/a		1 Q	Valderrama - Solas (CHI); W 2–0	Pinto - García (ARG); L 1–2	2nd place, silver medalist(s)

== Bodybuilding ==
Uruguay qualified a full team of two bodybuilders (one male and one female).

Athlete	Event	Pre-judging		Final	
Athlete	Event	Points	Ranking	Points	Ranking
Rodrigo Chucarro	Men's class bodybuilding	—N/a		Did not advance	
María Josefina Larraud	Women's bikini fitness	—N/a		Did not advance	

- There were no results in the pre-judging stage, with only the top six advancing.

== Boxing ==
Uruguay qualified one male boxer.

Men

Athlete	Event	Quarterfinal	Semifinal	Final	
Athlete	Event	Opposition Result	Opposition Result	Opposition Result	Rank
Lucas Fernández	–56 kg	Keevin Allicock (GUY); W 3-2	Duke Ragan (USA); L 0-5	—N/a	3rd place, bronze medalist(s)

== Canoeing ==
=== Sprint ===
Uruguay qualified a total of 4 sprint athletes.

Men

Athlete	Event	Heat		Semifinal		Final	
Athlete	Event	Time	Rank	Time	Rank	Time	Rank
Sebastián Delgado	K-1 1000 m	3:39.182	2 QF	—N/a		3:39.135	4
Sebastián Delgado; Matías Otero	K-2 1000 m	3:45.966	4 QSF	3:30.504	3 QF	3:23.449	5
Sebastián Delgado; Matías Otero; Julián Cabrera; José López	K-4 500 m	—N/a				1:25.901	7

== Cycling ==
=== Road ===
Men

Athlete	Event	Time	Rank
Pablo Zunino	Men's road race	4:09:18	24

Women

Athlete	Event	Time	Rank
Fabiana Granizal	Women's road race	2:19:51	8

=== Track ===
Omnium

Athlete	Event	Scratch race		Elimination race		Time trial		Points race		Total	
Athlete	Event	Rank	Points	Rank	Points	Rank	Points	Points	Rank	Points	Rank
Pablo Zunino	Men's	16	13	18	12	16	13	-60	DNF	-10	14
Fabiana Granizal	Women's	14	14	12	15	22	10	-20	15	28	15

== Equestrian ==
Uruguay qualified ten equestrians.

=== Dressage ===
Athlete	Horse	Event	Qualification						Grand Prix Freestyle / Intermediate I Freestyle	
Athlete	Horse	Event	Grand Prix / Prix St. Georges		Grand Prix Special / Intermediate I		Total		Grand Prix Freestyle / Intermediate I Freestyle	
Athlete	Horse	Event	Score	Rank	Score	Rank	Score	Rank	Score	Rank
Ramon Beca	Zaire	Individual	Eliminated		did not advance					
Agustina Bravo	SVR Rafaga	Individual	60.324	34	57.882	34	118.206	34	did not advance	

=== Eventing ===
Athlete	Horse	Event	Dressage		Cross-country		Jumping		Total	
Athlete	Horse	Event	Points	Rank	Points	Rank	Points	Rank	Points	Rank
Rodrigo Abella	SVR Arbitro	Individual	44.30	38	Eliminated		did not advance			
Luis Aranco	SVR Grunon	Individual	41.30	28	Eliminated		did not advance			
Lucia Chieza	SVR Energico	Individual	43.20	32	31.60	16	12.00	22	86.80	19
Edison Quintana	SVR Fraile del Santa Lucia	Individual	41.00	27	Eliminated		did not advance			
Rodrigo Abella; Luis Aranco; Lucia Chieza; Edison Quintana	As above	Team	125.50	8	2031.60	9	12.00	5	2086.80	9

=== Jumping ===
Athlete	Horse	Event	Qualification								Final					
Athlete	Horse	Event	Round 1		Round 2		Round 3		Total		Round A		Round B		Total	
Athlete	Horse	Event	Faults	Rank	Faults	Rank	Faults	Rank	Faults	Rank	Faults	Rank	Faults	Rank	Faults	Rank
Marcelo Chirico	QH Baloudarc LF	Individual	15.68	40	20	39	25	41	60.68	41	did not advance					
Raul Guarino	Dandy LV Chevet	Individual	15.98	41	16	33	12	28	43.98	36 Q	12	19 Q	16	21	28	21
Juan Luzardo	Stan	Individual	9.25	29	16	33	13	32	38.25	32 Q	12	19 Q	Retired			
Martin Rodriguez	Liborious	Individual	15.47	39	22	41	22	39	59.47	40 Q	Withdrew					
Marcelo Chirico; Raul Guarino; Juan Luzardo; Martin Rodriguez	As above	Team	40.40	10	52	8	47	9	139.40	8	—N/a					

== Field hockey ==
Uruguay qualified a women's team of 16 athletes. The team qualified by being ranked second at the 2018 South American Games.

=== Women's tournament ===
The following players were named in the Uruguay squad.

Head Coach: Nicolás Tixe

1. Constance Schmidt-Liermann (GK)
3. Manuela Vilar
5. Pilar Oliveros
6. Camila de Maria
7. Constanza Barrandeguy
8. Janine Stanley
10. Anastasia Olave
13. Agustina Taborda
14. Magdalena Gomez
15. Clementina Cristiani
17. Teresa Viana
20. Agustina Nieto (C)
21. Soledad Villar
22. Camila Piazza
25. Agustina Prattes
27. Jimena Garcia
29. Georgina Petrik
32. Maria Bate (GK)

Preliminary round

Pos	Team	Pld	W	D	L	GF	GA	GD	Pts	Qualification
1	Argentina	3	3	0	0	18	1	+17	9	Quarter-finals
2	Canada	3	2	0	1	15	3	+12	6	Quarter-finals
3	Uruguay	3	1	0	2	8	8	0	3	Quarter-finals
4	Cuba	3	0	0	3	2	31	−29	0	Quarter-finals

Source: FIH

29 July 2019
10:00

Argentina	2–0	Uruguay
Rebecchi 7'; D'Elía 47'	Report

Umpires:
Amber Church (NZL)
Megan Robertson (CAN)

31 July 2019
14:00

Uruguay	8–1	Cuba
Viana 2', 14'; Piazza 17', 19'; Cristiani 23'; Taborda 30'; Villar 39'; Stanley 46'	Report	Milanes 53'

Umpires:
Mary Driscoll (USA)
Catalina Montesino (CHI)

2 August 2019
10:00

Uruguay	0–5	Canada
	Report	Norlander 4'; Donohoe 10'; McManus 38', 43'; Stewart 51'

Umpires:
Mary Driscoll (USA)
Maria Locatelli (ARG)

Quarter-finals

4 August 2019
15:00

Uruguay	0–5	Chile
	Report	Maldonado 15', 17', 34'; Villagran 37'; Urroz 49'

Umpires:
Liu Xiaoying (CHN)
Ayanna McClean (TTO)

Cross over

6 August 2019
09:30

Peru	0–14	Uruguay
	Report	Viana 3', 30', 32', 42', 45'; Oliveros 11', 56'; Stanley 17'; Taborda 23', 31', 50'; Vilar del Valle 26', 32'; Olave 35'

Umpires:
Mary Driscoll (USA)
Megan Robertson (CAN)

5th place match

9 August 2019
11:45

Uruguay	4–0	Mexico
Vilar del Valle 32', 39' de María 57'; Nieto 60'	Report

Umpires:
Liu Xiaoying (CHN)
Megan Robertson (CAN)

== Football ==
Summary

Team	Event	Group stage				Semifinal	Final / BM / Pl.	
Team	Event	Opposition Result	Opposition Result	Opposition Result	Rank	Opposition Result	Opposition Result	Rank
Uruguay men	Men's tournament	Peru; W 2–0	Jamaica; W 2–0	Honduras; W 3–0	4	Argentina; L 0–3	Mexico; L 0–1	4

=== Men's tournament ===
Uruguay qualified a men's team of 18 athletes.

=== Men's tournament ===
Group B

Pos	Team	Pld	W	D	L	GF	GA	GD	Pts	Qualification
1	Uruguay	3	3	0	0	7	0	+7	9	Knockout stage
2	Honduras	3	1	1	1	5	6	−1	4	Knockout stage
3	Jamaica	3	1	0	2	3	5	−2	3	Fifth place match
4	Peru (H)	3	0	1	2	2	6	−4	1	Seventh place match

Source: Lima 2019
Rules for classification: Tie-breakers
(H) Hosts
29 July 2019
20:30

Uruguay	2–0	Peru
Núñez 6'; Fernández 36'	Report

Estadio Universidad San Marcos
Referee: Ulises Mereles (Paraguay)
1 August 2019
17:30

Jamaica	0–2	Uruguay
	Report	Fernández 61', 72'

Estadio Universidad San Marcos
Referee: Wagner Magalhães (Brazil)
4 August 2019
17:30

Uruguay	3–0	Honduras
Arriaga 34' (o.g.); Ramírez 75' (pen.); Fernández 84'	Report

Estadio Universidad San Marcos
Referee: Gustavo Murillo (Colombia)

Semifinal

7 August 2019
20:30

Uruguay	0–3	Argentina
	Report	Gaich 6', 85'; Valenzuela 29'

Estadio Universidad San Marcos
Referee: Wagner Magalhães (Brazil)

Bronze medal match

10 August 2019
17:30

Mexico	1–0	Uruguay
Yrizar 7'	Report

Estadio Universidad San Marcos
Referee: Fernando Echenique (Argentina)

== Golf ==
Uruguay qualified a full team of four golfers (two men and two women).

Athlete(s)	Event	Final					
Athlete(s)	Event	Round 1	Round 2	Round 3	Round 4	Total	Rank
Juan Álvarez	Men's individual	70	72	67	67	276 (-8)	8
Facundo Álvarez	Men's individual	70	71	77	73	291 (+7)	25
Sofia Garcia Austt	Women's individual	73	72	71	75	291 (+7)	12
Jimena Marques Vazquez	Women's individual	73	73	78	74	298 (+14)	20
Juan Álvarez; Facundo Álvarez; Sofia Garcia Austt; Jimena Marques Vazquez	Mixed team	143	143	138	141	565 (-3)	11

== Gymnastics ==
=== Artistic ===
Uruguay qualified one male and one female artistic gymnast.

Men
Individual qualification

Athlete	Apparatus												Overall result	Pos.
Athlete	F		PH		R		V		PB		HB		Overall result	Pos.
Athlete	Result	Pos.	Result	Pos.	Result	Pos.	Result	Pos.	Result	Pos.	Result	Pos.	Overall result	Pos.
Victor Rostagno	13.050	21	9.450	43	12.200	38	14.150	11	10.400	46	12.250	26	71.500	30

Women
Individual qualification

Athlete	Apparatus								Overall result	Pos.
Athlete	V		UB		BB		F		Overall result	Pos.
Athlete	Result	Pos.	Result	Pos.	Result	Pos.	Result	Pos.	Overall result	Pos.
Pierina Cedres	12.150	39	10.700	42	10.700	37	11.200	37	44.750	32

== Judo ==
Uruguay qualified one male judoka.

Men

Athlete	Event	Preliminaries	Quarterfinals	Semifinals	Repechage	Final / BM	
Athlete	Event	Opposition Result	Opposition Result	Opposition Result	Opposition Result	Opposition Result	Rank
Pablo Aprahamian	100 kg	Junior Angulo (ECU); L 00S2-01S2	Did not advance				9

== Karate ==
Kumite (sparring)

Athlete	Event	Round robin				Semifinal	Final	
Athlete	Event	Opposition Result	Opposition Result	Opposition Result	Rank	Opposition Result	Opposition Result	Rank
Maximiliano Larrosa	Men's –60 kg	Agustín Farah (ARG); W 5-0	Andrés Rendón (COL); W 4-3	Douglas Brose (BRA); D 1-1	1 Q	Joaquín Lavín (CHI); L 0-3	—N/a	3rd place, bronze medalist(s)
Juan Alen Macedo	Men's –84 kg	Kamran Madani (USA); L 0-4	Alan Cuevas (MEX); L 2-4	Mohamed Yussuf (BOL); W 4-0	3	—N/a		5

== Modern pentathlon ==
Uruguay qualified three modern pentathletes (two men and one woman).

Athlete	Event	Fencing (Épée one touch)				Swimming (200 m freestyle)			Riding (Show jumping)			Shooting / Running (10 m laser pistol / 3000 m cross-country)			Total	
Athlete	Event	V – D	Rank	MP points	BP	Time	Rank	MP points	Penalties	Rank	MP points	Time	Rank	MP points	MP points	Rank
Joaquín Musto	Men's individual	13-18	21	187	2	2:23.11	26	264	22	13	278	13:22.00	29	498	1229	18
Bryan Fabian Aranda	Men's individual	8-23	28	152	5	2:22.30	24	266			EL	12:40.00	26	540	963	29
Joaquín Musto; Bryan Fabian Aranda	Men's relay	13	9	210	0	2:04.61	9	301	33	3	267	11:56.00	11	584	1362	9
Lucia Sanabia	Women's individual	8-23	28	152	0	3:23.63	30	143			DNS	16:53.00	29	287	582	30

== Roller sports ==
=== Artistic ===
Uruguay qualified a female artistic skater.

Athlete	Event	Short program		Long program		Total	
Athlete	Event	Score	Rank	Score	Rank	Score	Rank
María Agustina Suanes	Women's	18.83	5	22.90	7	41.73	7

== Rowing ==
Uruguay qualified five boats and ten rowers (nine men and one woman).

Men

Athlete	Event	Heat		Repechage		Semifinal		Final	
Athlete	Event	Time	Rank	Time	Rank	Time	Rank	Time	Rank
Mauricio Lopez	Single sculls	8:28.74	5 R	7:23.02	2 SF	7:25.82	4 FB	7:26.03	11
Leandro Rodas; Martín Zocalo	Double sculls	6:44.62	3 R	6:29:25	3 FB	—N/a		6:37.55	7
Álvaro Silva; Felipe Klüver	Lwt double sculls	7:31.05	5 R	6:39:93	5 FB	—N/a		6:43.13	7
Bruno Cetraro; Martín González; Marcos Sarraute; Leandro Sauvagno	Quadruple sculls	6:17.61	1 FA	—N/a				5:50.68	DPG ^{a}

Women

Athlete	Event	Heat		Repechage		Semifinal		Final	
Athlete	Event	Time	Rank	Time	Rank	Time	Rank	Time	Rank
Sabrina Díaz	Lwt single sculls	8:19.83	5 R	8:01.43	4 FB	—N/a		DNS	

Legenda de classificação: FA=Final A (medalha); FB=Final B (sem medalha); SF=Semifinal;R=Repescagem

- ^{a} Marcos Sarraute, of Uruguay, lost his gold medal for doping violation. As a result, the Uruguayan team was eliminated from the competition.

== Rugby sevens ==
=== Men's tournament ===
Pool stage

Pos	Team	Pld	W	D	L	PF	PA	PD	Pts	Qualification
1	Argentina	3	3	0	0	96	7	+89	9	Semifinals
2	Canada	3	2	0	1	69	12	+57	7	Semifinals
3	Jamaica	3	1	0	2	14	93	−79	5	5–8th place semifinals
4	Uruguay	3	0	0	3	10	77	−67	3	5–8th place semifinals

Source: Lima 2019
Rules for classification: 1) Points; 2) Head-to-head result; 3) Point difference; 4) Points scored; 5) draw.

26 July 2019
12:20

Canada	31–0	Uruguay
Try: Hirayama (2) 1'm, 3'm Cejvanovic (2) 5'c, 8'c Morra 10'c Con: Hirayama (3/5) 6', 9', 10'	Report

Villa María del Triunfo Sports Center
Referee: Cisco Lopez (United States)

27 July 2019
13:05

Argentina	32–0	Uruguay
Try: Álvarez 1'c Del Mestre 5'm Gonzalez 6'm Mare 10'm Bazan Velez 12'm Sábato 13'm Con: Mare (1/3) 1'; Ulloa (0/2); Revol (0/1)	Report

Villa María del Triunfo Sports Center
Referee: Paulo Duarte (Portugal)

27 July 2019
16:30

Uruguay	10–14	Jamaica
Try: Passadore 7'm McCubbin 12'm Con: Pastore (0/1); Brazionis (0/1)	Report	Try: Caton-Brown 1'c Osborne 3'c Con: Adamson (2/2) 2', 3'

Villa María del Triunfo Sports Center
Referee: Dale Hall (Canada)

5th-8th place classification

28 July 2019
10:00

Chile	24–5	Uruguay
Try: Fe. Neira 0'm Blanc (2) 5'c, 14'c Fernández 7'm Con: Fernández (2/4) 6', 14'	Report	Try: Ardao 11'm Con: Brazionis (0/1)

Villa María del Triunfo Sports Center
Referee: Neheun Jauri Rivero (Argentina)

== Sailing ==
Uruguay has qualified 6 boats for a total of 9 sailors.

Athlete	Event	Race																					Total	
Athlete	Event	1	2	3	4	5	6	7	8	9	10	11	12	13	14	15	16	17	18	M1	M2	M3	Points	Pos.
Ignacio Rodriguez	Laser	7	10	6	13	9	~~16~~	10	10	4	7	—N/a								23; STP	—N/a		99	11º
Hernan Umpierre; Fernando Diz	49er	2	4	4	3	5	4	6	6	6	5	~~9~~; ~~DSQ~~	6	—N/a						—N/a	—N/a		51	6º
Dolores Moreira	Laser radial	1	4	1	3	5	2	5	6	~~19~~; ~~DSQ~~	8	—N/a								18	—N/a		53	4
Ricardo Fabini; Florencia Parnizari	Snipe	~~9~~	7	3	1	5	2	2	1	2	1	—N/a								10	—N/a		34	2nd place, silver medalist(s)
Pablo Defazio; Dominique Knüppel	Nacra 17	6	6	6	~~10~~	4	4	4	5	1	3	4.5	4	—N/a						8	—N/a		51.5	4º
Nicolas Landauer	Kites	~~6~~	2	1	1	1	4	2	2	2	2	1	1	3	3	2	2	~~11~~	~~9~~	6 UFD	2	2	39	2nd place, silver medalist(s)

== Shooting ==
Uruguay qualified five sport shooters (four men and one woman).

Men

Athlete	Event	Qualification		Final	
Athlete	Event	Points	Rank	Points	Rank
Ignacio Hernández	10 m air pistol	549-6x	32	—N/a	
Jonathan Ayala	10 m air rifle	611.6	18	—N/a	
Rudi Lausarot	10 m air rifle	618.0	8º Q	161.5	6
Franco González	Trap	115	12	—N/a	

Women

Athlete	Event	Qualification		Final	
Athlete	Event	Points	Rank	Points	Rank
Julieta Mautone	10 m air pistol	568-17x	1 Q	194.2	4
Julieta Mautone	25 m pistol	551-11x	20	—N/a	

Mixed

Athlete	Event	Qualification		Final	
Athlete	Event	Points	Rank	Points	Rank
Julieta Mautone; Ignacio Hernandez	10 m air pistol	753-17x	8	—N/a	

== Surfing ==
Uruguay qualified two male surfers in the sport's debut at the Pan American Games.

Artistic

Athlete	Event	Round 1	Round 2	Round 3	Round 4	Repechage 1	Repechage 2	Repechage 3	Repechage 4	Repechage 5	Final / BM	
Athlete	Event	Opposition Result	Opposition Result	Opposition Result	Opposition Result	Opposition Result	Opposition Result	Opposition Result	Opposition Result	Opposition Result	Opposition Result	Rank
Lucas Madrid	Men's open	Mesinas (PER); L 9.00 - 14.34	—N/a			Corzo (MEX); L 7.23 – 11.44	Did not advance					
Julian Schweizer	Men's longboard	Clemente (PER), Villao (ECU); L 11.17 Q	Robbins (USA), Gil (ARG); L 11.14 Q	Clemente (PER); L 15.70 - 18.10	—N/a			Cortéz (CHI); W 15.10 – 7.03	Gil (ARG) W 15.00 – 14.73	Robbins (USA) W 15.10 – 12.50	Clemente (PER) L 11.73 – 19.13	2nd place, silver medalist(s)

== Swimming ==
Uruguay qualified five women (two men and three women).

Key

- Note – Positions given to an entire phase
- QA – Qualified to final A
- QB – Qualified to final B

Men

Event	Athletes	Heat		Final	
Event	Athletes	Time	Rank	Time	Rank
50 metre freestyle	Enzo Martínez	22.77	10 QB	22.74	10
100 metre breaststroke	Martin Melconian	1:01.89	8 QA	1:02.09	8
200 metre breaststroke	Martin Melconian	2:21.72	14 QB	Withdrew	

Women

Event	Athletes	Heat		Final	
Event	Athletes	Time	Rank	Time	Rank
50 metre freestyle	Inés Remersaro	27.55	22	—N/a	
100 metre freestyle	Inés Remersaro	59.69	24	—N/a	
200 metre freestyle	Nicole Frank Rodriguez	2:09.97	19	—N/a	
100 metre breaststroke	Micaela Sierra Graf	1:15.02	16 QB	1:16.08	16
200 metre breaststroke	Micaela Sierra Graf	2:46.88	18	—N/a	
200 m medley	Nicole Frank Rodriguez	2:26.46	16 QB	2:26.43	14

== Tennis ==
Athlete	Event	Round of 64	Round of 32	Round of 16	Quarterfinals	Semifinals	Final / Bronze Medal	Rank
Athlete	Event	Opposition Score	Opposition Score	Opposition Score	Opposition Score	Opposition Score	Opposition Score	Rank
Franco Roncadelli	Men's singles	Seanon Williams (BAR); W 6-0, 6-0	João Menezes (BRA); L 4-6, 0-6	Did not advance				17
Francisco Llanes	Men's singles	Sam Riffice (USA); L 1-6,6-4, 5-7	Did not advance					33
Francisco Llanes; Franco Roncadelli	Men's doubles	n/a	Bye	Cid - Estrella Burgos (DOM); L 1-6, 5-7	Did not advance			9

== Triathlon ==
Individual

Athlete	Event	Swimming (1.5 km)	Transition 1	Biking (40 km)	Transition 2	Running (10 km)	Total	Rank
Federico Savecki	Men's	18:03	0:46	1:03:54	0:27	35:18	1:58:25	21

== Volleyball ==
=== Beach ===
Uruguay qualified a men's pair.

Athlete	Event	Group stage				Round of 16	Quarterfinal	Semifinal	Final / BM	
Athlete	Event	Opposition Result	Opposition Result	Opposition Result	Rank	Opposition Result	Opposition Result	Opposition Result	Opposition Result	Rank
Renzo Cairus; Mauricio Vieyto	Men's	González - Reyes (CUB); W 2–1	Brandão - Santos (BRA); L 0–2	Alpizar - Valenciano (CRC); W 2–0	3 Q	Leonardo - García (GUA); W 2–0	Capogrosso - Azaad (ARG); L 1–2	5th-8th place classification Brandão - Santos (BRA); W 2–0	5th place match González - Reyes (CUB); L 0–2	6

== Weightlifting ==
Uruguay qualified three weightlifters (two men and one woman).

Men

Athlete	Event	Snatch		Clean & jerk		Total	
Athlete	Event	Weight	Rank	Weight	Rank	Weight	Rank
Enrique Juanico	–96 kg	132	13	155	16	287	13
Rodrigo Marra	–109 kg	135	7	164	7	299	7

Women

Athlete	Event	Snatch		Clearn & jerk		Total	
Athlete	Event	Weight	Rank	Weight	Rank	Weight	Rank
Sofía Rito	–55 kg	73	9	90	9	163	9

== See also ==
- Uruguay at the 2020 Summer Olympics
