= Uruguay at the 2011 Pan American Games =

- IOC code: URU
- NOC: Uruguayan Olympic Committee
- Website: www.cou.org.uy

in Guadalajara 14–30 October 2011
- Competitors: 113 in 20 sports
- Flag bearer: Marcelo Chirico
- Medals Ranked 19th: Gold 0 Silver 3 Bronze 2 Total 5

Pan American Games appearances (overview)
- 1951; 1955; 1959; 1963; 1967; 1971; 1975; 1979; 1983; 1987; 1991; 1995; 1999; 2003; 2007; 2011; 2015; 2019; 2023; 2027

Uruguay competed at the 2011 Pan American Games in Guadalajara, Mexico from October 14 to 30, 2011. Uruguay sent 113 athletes in over sports.

== Medalists ==
Medal	Name	Sport	Event	Date
Silver	Carlos Buzzo; Enzo Cazzola	Basque pelota	Pairs Trinkete; Paleta Rubber	October 26
Silver	Gaston Dufau; Pablo Baldizan	Basque pelota	Pairs Trinkete; Paleta Leather	October 26
Silver	Maria Jimena Miranda; Camila Naviliat	Basque pelota	Pairs Trinkete; Paleta Rubber	October 27
Bronze	Pablo Defazio; Manfredo Finck	Sailing	Snipe	October 23
Bronze	Uruguay national football team	Football	Men's tournament	October 28

== Athletics ==
=== Men ===
Track and road events

Event	Athletes	Heats		Semifinal		Final	
Event	Athletes	Time	Rank	Time	Rank	Time	Rank
5000 m	Ubaldo de los Santos	did not advance				15:23.87	14th
400 m hurdles	Andrés Silva			DNF		did not advance	

Field events

Event	Athletes	Semifinal		Final	
Event	Athletes	Result	Rank	Result	Rank
Long jump	Emiliano Lasa	7.81 m. PB	4th Q	7.73 m.	6th
Discus throw	Rodolfo Daniel Casanova			48.62 m.	11th

=== Women ===
Track and road events

Event	Athletes	Semifinal		Final	
Event	Athletes	Time	Rank	Time	Rank
400 m hurdles	Déborah Rodríguez	1:00.72	5th	did not advance	

Field events

Event	Athletes	Semifinal		Final	
Event	Athletes	Result	Rank	Result	Rank
Pole vault	Déborah Gyurcsek			3.70 m.	12th

== Basketball ==
Men

Team

- Emiliano Baston
- Nicolas Borsellino
- Hernando Caceres
- Bruno Fitipaldo
- Federico Haller
- Ican Loriente
- Reque Newsome
- Joaquin Osimani
- Martin Osimani
- Juan Pablo Silveira
- Sebastian Vazquez
- Santiago Vidal

Standings

Pos	Team	Pld	W	L	PF	PA	PD	Pts	Qualification
1	United States	3	2	1	231	206	+25	5 (Note: United States 77–76 Dominican Republic)	Advance to Semifinals
2	Dominican Republic	3	2	1	231	194	+37	5	Advance to Semifinals
3	Brazil	3	1	2	206	238	−32	4 (Note: Brazil 80–71 Uruguay)	
4	Uruguay	3	1	2	214	244	−30	4	

Notes:

Results

October 26
13:00

Report

Brazil	80–71	Uruguay
Scoring by quarter: 19–18, 17–17, 20–16, 24–20
Pts: Giovannoni 15; Rebs: Giovannoni 8 Asts: Santos 3		Pts: Fitipaldo 16; Rebs: Vázquez, Borsellino 5 Asts: Osimani 5

CODE Dome, Guadalajara
Referees: Fernandez (ARG), Fernandez (CRC), Vazquez (PUR)

October 27
17:30

Report

Uruguay	55–69	Dominican Republic
Scoring by quarter: 15–17, 19–19, 12–13, 9–20
Pts: Osimani 16; Rebs: Osimani 8 Asts: Osimani 4		Pts: Coronado Gil 17; Rebs: Martínez 21; Asts: Martínez 4

CODE Dome, Guadalajara
Referees: Aluz (ARG), Ramos (MEX), Vazquez (PUR)

October 28
17:30

Report

United States	80–82	Uruguay
Scoring by quarter: 29–20, 24–22, 11–20, 16–20
Pts: Dyson 19; Rebs: Lyons 6 Asts: Sloan 3		Pts: Osimani 23; Rebs: Borsellino 8 Asts: Osimani 6

CODE Dome, Guadalajara
Referees: Donnelly (CAN), Dueñas (COL), Ramos (MEX)

Seventh Place Match

October 29
10:30

Report

Argentina	71–69	Uruguay
Scoring by quarter: 22–16, 18–12, 20–20, 11–21
Pts: Sandes 23; Rebs: Sandes 10; Asts: 3 players 3		Pts: Borsellino 15; Rebs: Borsellino 10; Asts: Osimani 8

CODE Dome, Guadalajara
Referees: Vazquez (PUR), Hayles (JAM), Fernandez (CRC)

2011 Pan American Games 8th

Uruguay

== Basque pelota ==
Uruguay qualified two athletes each in the paleta rubber pairs trinkete, paleta leather pairs trinkete, paleta leather pairs 36 m fronton, paleta leather pairs 30 m fronton, and the women's paleta rubber pairs trinkete categories.

=== Men ===
Athlete(s)	Event	Series 1	Series 2	Series 3	Series 4	Bronze Medal	Final
Athlete(s)	Event	Opposition Score	Opposition Score	Opposition Score	Opposition Score	Opposition Score	Opposition Score
Raul Comesaña; Fausto Lancelotti	Paleta Rubber Pairs 30 m Fronton	Eduardo Casellas (VEN) & Jaime Vera; W 12-3, 12-10	Jose Fiffe (CUB) & Jhoan Torreblanca; L 5-12, 12-10, 1-5	Jesus Hurtado (MEX) & Daniel Salvador Rodriguez; L 1-12, 0-12	Leonardo Benique (PER) & Kevin Martinez; W 12-1, 12-2	did not advance	
Lucas Rivas; Elder Tavares	Paleta Leather Pairs 36 m Fronton	Rodrigo Ledesma (MEX) & Javier Francisco Mendiburu; L 15-5, 15-8	Jorge Borrajo (VEN) & Gabriel Reyes; L 10-15, 11-15	Luciano Callarelli (ARG) & Carlos Dorato; L 4-15, 13-15	Rafael Fernández (CUB) & Azuan Perez; L 9-15, 7-15	did not advance	
Pablo Baldizan; Gaston Dufau	Paleta Leather Pairs Trinkete	Jose Azael Herrera (MEX) & Jorge Marin; W 15-3, 15-7	Frendy Fernandez (CUB) & Anderson Jardines; W 15-6, 15-14	Cristian Algarbe (ARG) & Jorge Villegas; L 7-15, 12-15	Sebastian Perez (CHI) & Raimundo Saez; W 15-9, 15-6		Cristian Algarbe (ARG) & Jorge Villegas; L 7-15, 13-15 (silver)
Carlos Buzzo; Enzo Cazzola	Paleta Rubber Pairs Trinkete	Adrian Raya (MEX) & Guillermo Verdeja; W 15-8, 15-13	Jose Piña (VEN) & Jesus Zarraga; W 15-8, 15-2	Facundo Andreasen (ARG) & Sergio Villegas; L 4-15, 3-15	Sebastian De Orte (CHI) & Esteban Romero; W 15-2, 15-13		Facundo Andreasen (ARG) & Sergio Villegas; L 4-15, 3-15 (silver)

=== Women ===
Athlete(s)	Event	Series 1	Series 2	Series 3	Series 4	Bronze Medal	Final	Rank
Athlete(s)	Event	Opposition Score	Opposition Score	Opposition Score	Opposition Score	Opposition Score	Opposition Score	Rank
Maria Miranda; Camila Naviliat	Paleta Rubber Pairs Trinkete	Ariana Cepeda (MEX) & Rocio Guillen; W 15-12, 15-11	Yurisleidis Allue (CUB) & Daniela Darriba; W 15-5, 15-6	Maria Lis Garcia (ARG) & Veronica Stele; L 5-15, 5-15	Daniela Apablaza (CHI) & Zita Solas; W 15-14, 15-4		Maria Lis Garcia (ARG) & Veronica Stele; L 9-15, 6-15 (silver)	

== Beach volleyball ==
Uruguay qualified a men's and women's team in the beach volleyball competition.

Athlete	Event	Preliminary Round			Quarterfinals	Semifinals	Finals
Athlete	Event	Opposition Score	Opposition Score	Opposition Score	Opposition Score	Opposition Score	Opposition Score
Guillermo Williman; Nicolas Zanotta	Men's	Christian Redmann (CAN); Benjamin Saxton (CAN); L 17-21, 19-21	Dany López (NCA); Gerald Umaña (NCA); W 21-11, 21-13	Aldo Miramontes (MEX); Juan Virgen (MEX); W 21-18, 21-19	Alison Cerutti (BRA); Emanuel Rego (BRA); L 16-21, 13-21	did not advance	
Fabiana Gómez; Lucia Guigou	Women's	Nathalia Alfaro (CRC); Ingrid Morales (CRC); W 16-21, 21-14, 15-13	Amalia Valeska Hernandez (NCA); Lollette Rodríguez (NCA); W 21-12, 21-15	Bibiana Candelas (MEX); Mayra García (MEX); L 15-21, 10-21	Emily Day (USA); Heather Hughes (USA); L 12-21, 12-21	did not advance	

== Equestrian ==
=== Eventing ===
Athlete	Horse	Event	Dressage		Cross-country		Jumping				Total	
Athlete	Horse	Event	Dressage		Cross-country		Qualifier		Final		Total	
Athlete	Horse	Event	Penalties	Rank	Penalties	Rank	Penalties	Rank	Penalties	Rank	Penalties	Rank
Federico Daners	SVR Ron	Individual	63.20	32nd	20.00	23rd	4.00	22nd	12.00	17th	99.20	17th
Gimena Fernandez	Lover Foss	Individual	67.80	42nd	59.20	28th	7.00	26th	did not advance			

=== Jumping ===
Individual

Athlete	Horse	Event	Ind. 1st Qualifier		Ind. 2nd Qualifier			Ind. 3rd Qualifier			Ind. Final					
Athlete	Horse	Event	Ind. 1st Qualifier		Ind. 2nd Qualifier			Ind. 3rd Qualifier			Round A		Round B		Total	
Athlete	Horse	Event	Penalties	Rank	Penalties	Total	Rank	Penalties	Total	Rank	Penalties	Rank	Penalties	Rank	Penalties	Rank
Marcelo Chirico	Omanie Du Landais	Individual	7.29	35th	9.00	16.29	31st	16.00	32.29	43rd	did not advance					
Martin Rodriguez	Cointreau Z	Individual	11.55	43rd	5.00	16.55	32nd	6.00	22.55	30th	10.00	24th	2.00	19th	34.55	19th
Carlos Cola	Don Quijote	Individual	15.44	51st	17.00	32.44	32nd	9.00	41.44	48th	did not advance					
Federico Daners	Chicolas	Individual	38.80	54th	DNS			did not advance								

Team

Athlete	Horse	Event	Qualification Round		Final					
Athlete	Horse	Event	Qualification Round		Round 1		Round 2		Total	
Athlete	Horse	Event	Penalties	Rank	Penalties	Rank	Penalties	Rank	Penalties	Rank
Marcelo Chirico; Martin Rodriguez; Carlos Cola; Federico Daners	Omanie Du Landais; Cointreau Z Don Quijote; Chicolas	Team	34.28	11th	31.00	10th	31.00	11th	96.28	11th

== Football ==
Uruguay qualified a men's team in the football competition.

=== Men ===
- Matías Cubero
- Guillermo de los Santos
- Gastón Silva
- Adrián Gunino
- Facundo Píriz
- Mauricio Prieto
- Leonardo Pais
- Gonzalo Papa
- Federico Puppo
- Tabaré Viudez
- Maxi Rodríguez
- Martín Sebastian Rodríguez
- Santiago Silva
- Emiliano Albín
- Diego Martín Rodríguez
- Mathias Abero
- Gianni Rodríguez
- Matías Britos

Men's team will participate in Group A of the football tournament.

Pos	Team	Pld	W	D	L	GF	GA	GD	Pts	Qualification
1	Mexico	3	2	1	0	8	4	+4	7	Advance to Semifinals
2	Uruguay	3	1	1	1	4	6	−2	4	Advance to Semifinals
3	Trinidad and Tobago	3	0	3	0	3	3	0	3	
4	Ecuador	3	0	1	2	2	4	−2	1	

October 21, 2011
13:00

Ecuador	0 – 1	Uruguay
	Report	Puppo 4'

Estadio Omnilife, Guadalajara
Referee: Erick Roberto Andino (Honduras)

October 23, 2011
17:00

Mexico	5 – 2	Uruguay
Amione 15', 48'; Ponce 29'; Zavala 42'; Peralta 71'	Report	Prieto 51'; M. Rodríguez 57'

Estadio Omnilife, Guadalajara
Referee: Raúl Orosco (Bolivia)

October 25, 2011
10:00

Uruguay	1 – 1	Trinidad and Tobago
Abero 17'	Report	Winchester 10'

Estadio Omnilife, Guadalajara
Referee: Marlon Mejía (El Salvador)

==== Semifinals ====
October 26, 2011
20:00

Argentina	1 – 0	Uruguay
Pezzella 9'	Report

Estadio Omnilife, Guadalajara
Referee: Omar Ponce (Ecuador)

==== Bronze medal match ====
October 28, 2011
17:00

Costa Rica	1 – 2	Uruguay
McDonald 81' (pen.)	Report	G. Silva 48'; Píriz 61'

Estadio Omnilife, Guadalajara
Referee: Raúl Orosco (Bolivia)

== Judo ==
Uruguay qualified one athlete in the 73 kg men's category.

Men

Athlete	Event	Round of 16	Quarterfinals	Semifinals	Final
Athlete	Event	Opposition Result	Opposition Result	Opposition Result	Opposition Result
Sergio Sar Pellejero	−73 kg		Ronald Girones (CUB); L 000 - 100	did not advance (to repechage round)	

Repechage Rounds

Athlete	Event	Repechage 8	Repechage Final	Bronze Final
Athlete	Event	Opposition Result	Opposition Result	Opposition Result
Sergio Sar Pellejero	+100 kg		Lee Mata (MEX); L 000 S2 - 114	did not advance

== Karate ==
Uruguay qualified one athlete in the 84 kg men's category.

Athlete	Event	Round Robin (Pool A/B)			Semifinals	Final
Athlete	Event	Match 1	Match 2	Match 3	Semifinals	Final
Athlete	Event	Opposition Result	Opposition Result	Opposition Result	Opposition Result	Opposition Result
Pablo Layerla	Men's -84 kg	Homero Morales (MEX); L PTS 0:1	Sorin Alexandru (CAN); L PTS 0:7	Yilber Ocoro (COL); W PTS 4:1	did not advance	

== Modern pentathlon ==
Uruguay qualified one male pentathlete.

Men

Athlete	Event	Fencing (Épée One Touch)			Swimming (200m Freestyle)			Riding (Show Jumping)			Combined			Total Points	Final Rank
Athlete	Event	Results	Rank	MP Points	Time	Rank	MP Points	Penalties	Rank	MP Points	Time	Rank	MP Points	Total Points	Final Rank
Luis Siri	Men's	7 V - 17 D	22nd	640	2:36.34	23rd	924	93.60	21st	1028	16:23.73	22nd	1068	3660	22nd

== Roller skating ==
Women

Artistic

Athlete	Event	Short Program		Long Program	
Athlete	Event	Result	Rank	Result	Rank
Lucia Rivas	Free skating	104.80	10th	108.80	7th

== Rowing ==
=== Men ===
Athlete(s)	Event	Heats		Repechage		Final	
Athlete(s)	Event	Time	Rank	Time	Rank	Time	Rank
Jhonatan Esquivel	Single sculls (M1x)	7:54.38	5th R	7:45.16	4th qB	7:25.48	4th B
Rodolfo Collazo; Emiliano Dumestre	Lightweight double sculls (LM2x)	6:50.29	4th R	6:51.25	3rd qB	6:44.89	1st B
German Anchieri; Jhonatan Esquivel; Martin Saldivia; Leandro Salvagno	Quadruple sculls (M4x)	6:29.05	4th Q			6:07.84	5th

== Rugby sevens ==
Uruguay qualified a team to participate in rugby sevens. It consisted of 12 athletes.

Team

- Jose Albanell
- Santiago Arocena
- Felipe Berchesi
- Sebastian Cuello
- Ezequiel Espiga
- Federico Favaro
- Juan Martin Llovet
- Manuel Martinez
- Rodrigo Martinez
- Agustín Ormaechea
- Alejo Parra
- Alberto Román

Team	Pld	W	D	L	PF	PA	PD	Pts
Argentina	3	3	0	0	92	15	+77	12
Uruguay	3	2	0	1	52	26	+26	9
Guyana	3	1	0	2	12	65	−53	6
Mexico	3	0	0	3	10	60	−50	3

October 29, 2011
12:15

Uruguay	20 – 0	Guyana
	Report

Tlaquepaque Stadium, Guadalajara

October 29, 2011
14:25

Uruguay	22 – 0	Mexico
	Report

Tlaquepaque Stadium, Guadalajara

October 29, 2011
16:05

Argentina	26 – 10	Uruguay
	Report

Tlaquepaque Stadium, Guadalajara

=== Quarterfinals ===
October 30, 2011
9:25

Brazil	0 – 7	Uruguay
	Report

Tlaquepaque Stadium, Guadalajara

=== Semifinals ===
October 30, 2011
12:00

Argentina	17 – 5	Uruguay
	Report

Tlaquepaque Stadium, Guadalajara

=== Bronze medal match ===
October 30, 2011
14:30

Uruguay	17 – 19	United States
Tries: Ormaechea (2); Cons: Berchesi (1/2)	Report	Tries: Pulu, Punimata, Unufe; Cons: Niua (2/2)

Tlaquepaque Stadium, Guadalajara

== Sailing ==
Uruguay qualified three boats and four athletes in the sailing competition.

Men

Athlete	Event	Race											Net Points	Final Rank
Athlete	Event	1	2	3	4	5	6	7	8	9	10	M	Net Points	Final Rank
Alejandro Foglia	Single-handed Dinghy (Laser)	4	3	7	6	4	4	4	3	(8)	2	8	45.0	4th

Women

Athlete	Event	Race											Net Points	Final Rank
Athlete	Event	1	2	3	4	5	6	7	8	9	10	M	Net Points	Final Rank
Andrea Foglia	Single-handed Dinghy (Laser Radial)	10	7	5	7	7	(11)	8	6	8	10	/	68.0	9th

=== Open ===
Athlete	Event	Race											Net Points	Final Rank
Athlete	Event	1	2	3	4	5	6	7	8	9	10	M	Net Points	Final Rank
Pablo Defazio; Manfredo Finck	Double-handed Dinghy (Snipe)	(9)	3	2	4	6	4	4	4	3	3	4	37.0	3rd place, bronze medalist(s)

== Shooting ==
Men

Event	Athlete	Qualification		Final	
Event	Athlete	Score	Rank	Score	Rank
10 m air rifle	Rudi Lausarot	577-31x	21st	did not advance	

Women

Event	Athlete	Qualification		Final	
Event	Athlete	Score	Rank	Score	Rank
10 m air rifle	Diana Cabrera	374-16x	28th	did not advance	

== Synchronized swimming ==
Uruguay qualified a pair of athletes in the duet synchronized swimming competition.

Athletes	Event	Technical Routine		Free Routine (Final)			
Athletes	Event	Points	Rank 1	Points	Rank	Total Points	Rank
Sofia Orihuela; Florencia Rodrigo	Women's duet	68.375	10th	69.400	10th	137.775	10th

== Swimming ==
Men

Event	Athlete(s)	Preliminaries		Swim-off		Final	
Event	Athlete(s)	Result	Rank	Result	Rank	Result	Rank
50 m Freestyle	Gabriel Melconian	22.96	=8th (Q Swim-off)	23.07	2nd qB	23.10	3rd B
100 m Freestyle	Gabriel Melconian	51.02	12th qB			50.30	2nd B
200 m Freestyle	Martin Kutscher	1:53.32	10th qB			1:53.89	6th B
100 m Breaststroke	Martin Melconian	1:03.05	6th Q			1:03.10	6th
200 m Butterfly	Joel Romeu	2:07.87	14th qB			2:06.30	5th B
200 m Individual Medley	Joel Romeu	2:18.02	14th			did not advance	
400 m Individual Medley	Joel Romeu	4:53.76	11th			did not advance	
4 × 100 m Freestyle Relay	Rodrigo Cacerers; Gabriel Melconian; Joel Romeu; Martin Kutscher	3:32.08	5th Q			3:28.27	6th

Women

Event	Athletes	Heats		Final	
Event	Athletes	Time	Position	Time	Position
100 m Backstroke	Ines Remesaro	1:07.61	20th	did not advance	
200 m Backstroke	Ines Remesaro	2:27.77	16th QB	2:24.16	4th B

== Taekwondo ==
Uruguay qualified one athlete in the 58 kg men's category.

Men

Athlete	Event	Round of 16	Quarterfinals	Semifinals	Final
Athlete	Event	Opposition Result	Opposition Result	Opposition Result	Opposition Result
Maykko Votta	Flyweight (-58kg)	Victor Gonzalez (PAN); W 10 - 9	Marcio Ferreira (BRA); L 2 – 7	did not advance	

== Tennis ==
Men

Athlete	Event	1st Round	Round of 32	Round of 16	Quarterfinals	Semifinals	Final
Athlete	Event	Opposition Score	Opposition Score	Opposition Score	Opposition Score	Opposition Score	Opposition Score
Ariel Behar	Singles	Mauricio Doria-Medina (BOL); L 6(5) - 7, 4 - 6	did not advance				
Federico Sansonetti	Singles	Nicolás Massú (CHI); L 0 - 6, 1 - 6	did not advance				
Martín Cuevas	Singles	Daniel Alejandro Lopez (PAR); L 6(6) - 7, 4 - 6	did not advance				
Martín Cuevas; Federico Sansonetti	Doubles		Christopher Diaz-Figueroa (GUA); Sebastien Vidal (GUA); W 6 - 3, 4 - 6, [10-6]	Juan Sebastián Cabal (COL); Robert Farah Maksoud (COL); W 1 - 6, 3 - 6	did not advance		

== Triathlon ==
American

Men

Athlete	Event	Swim (1.5 km)	Trans 1	Bike (40 km)	Trans 2	Run (10 km)	Total	Rank
Martin Oliver	Individual	19:25; 25th	0:28; 33rd	58:54; 27th	0:19; 28th	39:08; 19th	1:58:16	27th

Women

Athlete	Event	Swim (1.5 km)	Trans 1	Bike (40 km)	Trans 2	Run (10 km)	Total	Rank
Virginia Lopez	Individual	DSQ						

== Weightlifting ==
Athlete	Event	Snatch			Clean & Jerk			Total	Rank
Athlete	Event	Attempt 1	Attempt 2	Attempt 3	Attempt 1	Attempt 2	Attempt 3	Total	Rank
Mauro Acosta	Men's 62 kg	80	86	~~90~~	110	117	124	210	8th
