= Uruguay at the 1995 Pan American Games =

- IOC code: URU
- NOC: Uruguayan Olympic Committee
- Website: www.cou.org.uy

in Mar del Plata 11–26 March 1995
- Medals Ranked 11th: Gold 1 Silver 4 Bronze 3 Total 8

Pan American Games appearances (overview)
- 1951; 1955; 1959; 1963; 1967; 1971; 1975; 1979; 1983; 1987; 1991; 1995; 1999; 2003; 2007; 2011; 2015; 2019; 2023; 2027

The 12th Pan American Games were held in Mar del Plata, Argentina from March 11 to March 26, 1995.

== Medals ==
=== Silver ===
===== Cycling =====
- Men's Points Race (Track): Milton Wynants

=== Bronze ===
===== Cycling =====
- Men's Individual Time Trial (Road): Servando Figueredo

== Results by event ==
=== Athletics ===
- Juan Silva
- Ricardo Vera

=== Basketball ===
==== Men's team competition ====
- Preliminary round

- Defeated Mexico (92-78)
- Lost to Argentina (81-83)
- Lost to Brazil (83-107)
- Lost to United States (96-104)
- Defeated Puerto Rico (101-76)

- Semi-Finals

- Lost to Argentina (74-90)

- Bronze Medal Match

- Lost to Brazil (86-90) → 4th place

- Team roster

- Marcel Bouzout
- Gonzalo Caneiro
- Marcelo Capalbo
- Federico Garcín
- Jeffrey Granger
- Adrián Laborda
- Diego Losada
- Alain Mayor
- Oscar Moglia Jr.
- Gustavo Sczygielski
- Luis Silveira
- Luis Pierri

- Head coach: Victor Berardi

=== Cycling ===
- Gregorio Bare
- Fernando Britos
- Gustavo Figueredo
- Sergio Tesitore
- Milton Wynants

=== Swimming ===
- Javier Golovchenko

=== Rowing ===
- Norberto Alvarez
- Gianfranco Percovich
- Jesús Posse
- Daniel Salvagno
- Ruben Scarpatti
- Marcelo Trigo

=== Taekwondo ===
- Julio Carbajal

=== Tennis ===
- Claudia Brause
- Marcelo Filippini
- Diego Pérez

== See also ==
- Sport in Uruguay
- Uruguay at the 1996 Summer Olympics
