= Basque pelota at the 1995 Pan American Games =

Basque pelota was on the program for the first time at the 1995 Pan American Games in Mar del Plata, Argentina.

== Men's events ==
Event	Gold	Silver	Bronze
30m Frontenis	Mexico; Mexico	Argentina; Argentina	Cuba; Cuba
Trinquete Goma	Argentina; Argentina	Uruguay; Uruguay	Chile; Chile

== Women's events ==
Event	Gold	Silver	Bronze
30m Frontenis	Mexico; Mexico	Cuba; Cuba	Argentina; Argentina
Trinquete Goma	Argentina; Argentina	Mexico; Mexico	Uruguay; Uruguay

=== Open events ===
Event	Gold	Silver	Bronze
30m Goma	Argentina; Argentina	Mexico; Mexico	Cuba; Cuba
36m Mano Singles	Mexico; Mexico	Venezuela; Venezuela	Cuba; Cuba
36m Mano Doubles	Mexico; Mexico	Venezuela; Venezuela	Cuba; Cuba
36m Corta	Cuba; Cuba	Mexico; Mexico	Argentina; Argentina
36m Cuero	Argentina; Argentina	Cuba; Cuba	Mexico; Mexico
Trinquete Mano	Mexico; Mexico	Cuba; Cuba	Venezuela; Venezuela
Trinquete Mano Doubles	Mexico; Mexico	Venezuela; Venezuela	Cuba; Cuba
Trinquete Cuero	Uruguay; Uruguay	Argentina; Argentina	Mexico; Mexico

== Medal table ==
Place	Nation	Gold medal	Silver medal	Bronze medal	Total
1	Mexico	6	3	2	11
2	Argentina	4	2	2	8
3	Cuba	1	3	5	9
4	Uruguay	1	1	1	3
5	Venezuela	0	3	1	4
6	Chile	0	0	1	1
Total		12	12	12	36
