= Cycling at the 2002 Central American and Caribbean Games =

- Location: San Salvador
- Dates: 24 November-1 December

This page shows the results of the cycling competition at the 2002 Central American and Caribbean Games, held on 24 November to 1 December 2002 in San Salvador, El Salvador.

== Medal summary ==
=== Men's events ===
Event	Gold	Silver	Bronze
1 km Time Trial	Wilson Meneses (COL)	Alexander Cornieles (VEN)	Francisco Caballero (MEX)
Sprint	Jonathan Marín (COL)	Wilson Meneses (COL)	Alexander Cornieles (VEN)
Team Sprint	Venezuela; Alexander Cornieles; Jhonny Hernandez; Rubén Osorio	Colombia; Wilson Meneses; Jonathan Marín; Víctor Álvarez	Mexico; Mario Contreras; Francisco Caballero; Marco Zaragoza
4000m Individual Pursuit	José Sánchez (MEX)	Juan Pablo Forero (COL)	Isaac Cañizales (VEN)
4000m Team Pursuit	Colombia; Andrés Rodríguez; Juan Pablo Forero; Iván Casas; Carlos Alzate	Venezuela; Tomás Gil; Andris Hernández; Isaac Cañizales; Franklin Chacón	Mexico; Ignacio Sarabia; Juan Contreras; Marco Zaragoza; David Ramírez
Points Race	Ferney Bello (COL)	José Sánchez (MEX)	Honorio Machado (VEN)
Keirin	Rubén Osorio (VEN)	Jonathan Marín (COL)	Elisha Greene (TRI)
Scratch	Chesen Frey (ISV)	Luis Pérez (DOM)	Edwin Turriago (COL)
Madison	Mexico; Luis Fernando Macías; José Sánchez	Colombia; Edwin Turriago; Juan Pablo Forero	Venezuela; Tomás Gil; Miguel Ubeto
Road Race	José Chacón (VEN)	Oscar Álvarez (COL)	Domingo González (MEX)
Road Time Trial	Domingo González (MEX)	José Chacón (VEN)	Andrés Rodríguez (COL)

=== Women's events ===
Event	Gold	Silver	Bronze
500m Time Trial	Nancy Contreras (MEX)	Daniela Larreal (VEN)	Diana García (COL)
Sprint	Daniela Larreal (VEN)	Nancy Contreras (MEX)	Diana García (COL)
3000m Individual Pursuit	María Calle (COL)	Belem Guerrero (MEX)	Evelyn García (ESA)
Points Race	Belem Guerrero (MEX)	Evelyn García (ESA)	Dayana Chirinos (VEN)
Keirin	Daniela Larreal (VEN)	Diana García (COL)	Nancy Contreras (MEX)
Scratch	Daniela Larreal (VEN)	Belem Guerrero (MEX)	Evelyn García (ESA)
Road Race	Iona Wynter (JAM)	Amelia Blanco (DOM)	Belem Guerrero (MEX)
Road Time Trial	María Molina (GUA)	Ana Madriñan (COL)	Evelyn García (ESA)
