= Shooting at the 2011 Pan American Games – Men's 10 metre air rifle =

Shooting – Men's 10 metre air rifle at the 2011 Pan American Games
- Venue: Pan American Shooting Polygon
- Dates: October 17
- Competitors: 26 from 16 nations

Medalists
Gold medal	Matthew Rawlings	United States
Silver medal	Jonathan Hall	United States
Bronze medal	Gonzalo Moncada	Chile

The men's 10 metre air rifle shooting event at the 2011 Pan American Games was held on October 17 at the Pan American Shooting Polygon in Guadalajara. The defending Pan American Games champion is Jason Parker of the United States.

The event consisted of two rounds: a qualifier and a final. In the qualifier, each shooter fired 60 shots with an air rifle at 10 metres distance from the standing position. Scores for each shot were in increments of 1, with a maximum score of 10.

The top 8 shooters in the qualifying round moved on to the final round. There, they fired an additional 10 shots. These shots scored in increments of .1, with a maximum score of 10.9. The total score from all 70 shots was used to determine final ranking.

With the second-place finish (first-place finisher had already qualified a quota spot) Jonathan Hall of the United States qualifies his country a quota spot for the men's 10 metre air rifle event at the 2012 Summer Olympics in London, Great Britain.

== Schedule ==
All times are Central Standard Time (UTC-6).

Date	Time	Round
October 17, 2011	9:00	Qualification
October 17, 2011	14:00	Final

== Records ==
The existing world and Pan American Games records were as follows.

Qualification records
World record	Tevarit Majchacheep (THA); Denis Sokolov (RUS); Gagan Narang (IND); Gagan Narang (IND)	600	Langkawi, Malaysia; Winterthur, Switzerland; Bangkok, Thailand; New Delhi, India	January 27, 2000; March 1, 2008; November 5, 2008; October 6, 2010
Pan American record	Jason Parker (USA); Matthew Rawlings (USA)	594	Rio de Janeiro, Brazil; Rio de Janeiro, Brazil	July 15, 2007; July 15, 2007

Final records
World record	Gagan Narang (IND)	703.6 (600+103.6)	New Delhi, India	October 13, 2010
Pan American record	Jason Parker (USA)	695.8 (594+101.8)	Rio de Janeiro, Brazil	July 15, 2007

== Results ==
=== Qualification round ===
26 athletes from 16 countries competed.

Rank	Athlete	Country	1	2	3	4	5	6	Total	Notes
1	Matthew Rawlings	United States	99	100	100	100	98	98	595	Q, PR
2	Jonathan Hall	United States	100	99	99	99	99	98	594	Q
3	Jose De Jesus Mariscal	Mexico	100	98	100	99	97	97	591	Q
4	Cory Neifer	Canada	98	99	98	98	100	95	588	Q
5	Gonzalo Moncada	Chile	98	93	99	97	99	100	586	Q
6	Pablo Alvarez	Argentina	96	97	98	98	98	99	586	Q
7	Jose Luis Sanchez	Mexico	98	95	98	100	96	99	586	Q
8	Octavio Sandoval	Guatemala	98	99	98	98	96	96	585	Q
9	Bruno Heck	Brazil	99	99	96	96	96	98	584	
10	Marcelo Zoccali	Argentina	96	95	97	99	98	98	583	
11	Elvin Aroldo Lopez	Guatemala	96	98	98	94	98	98	582	
12	Yoleisy Lois	Cuba	94	98	97	99	98	96	582	
13	Cristian Morales	Bolivia	96	96	97	98	97	97	581	
14	Rocco Rosito	Brazil	98	97	96	94	98	98	581	
15	Julio Cesar Iemma	Venezuela	99	96	99	94	94	98	580	
16	Grzegorz Sych	Canada	97	97	97	97	96	95	579	
17	Rene Mejia	El Salvador	97	97	96	94	98	97	579	
18	Cesar Yui	Peru	96	97	97	98	96	94	578	
19	Mauricio Huerta	Chile	96	97	95	96	96	98	578	
20	Reynier Estopiñan	Cuba	96	98	97	94	95	98	578	
21	Rudi Lausarot	Uruguay	93	96	98	97	97	96	577	
22	Walter Martinez	Nicaragua	94	96	96	94	91	98	569	
23	Miguel Mejia	Peru	92	91	97	97	98	92	567	
24	Alexander Rivera	Puerto Rico	94	97	95	92	95	94	567	
25	Raul Vargas	Venezuela	93	91	94	95	95	95	563	
26	Hosman Duran	Dominican Republic	85	89	89	82	89	85	519	

=== Final ===
Rank	Athlete	Qual	1	2	3	4	5	6	7	8	9	10	Final	Total	Notes
1st place, gold medalist(s)	Matthew Rawlings (USA)	595	10.3	10.1	10.3	10.4	10.0	10.2	10.4	9.3	10.4	10.3	101.7	696.7	FPR
2nd place, silver medalist(s)	Jonathan Hall (USA)	594	10.1	10.4	10.4	9.6	10.4	10.2	10.3	10.7	10.0	10.5	102.6	696.6	
3rd place, bronze medalist(s)	Gonzalo Moncada (CHI)	586	9.9	10.7	10.4	10.0	10.2	10.4	10.1	10.3	10.6	10.3	102.9	688.9	
4	Jose De Jesus Mariscal (MEX)	591	9.5	9.9	9.4	10.5	10.2	10.0	9.5	9.9	9.2	9.7	97.8	688.8	
5	Cory Neifer (CAN)	588	9.1	10.5	10.4	10.2	9.9	10.3	10.4	10.4	9.3	9.8	100.3	688.3	
6	Octavio Sandoval (GUA)	585	10.0	10.9	10.2	10.1	10.4	10.0	9.9	10.3	10.4	9.7	101.9	686.9	
7	Pablo Alavarez (ARG)	586	10.3	9.8	10.2	9.9	9.0	10.9	10.5	10.0	9.4	10.3	100.3	686.3	
8	Jose Luis Sanchez (MEX)	586	9.3	10.8	9.4	9.8	9.7	9.9	9.4	10.3	10.6	9.6	98.8	684.8	
