= Uruguay at the 1991 Pan American Games =

- IOC code: URU
- NOC: Uruguayan Olympic Committee
- Website: cou.org.uy

in Havana 8–18 August 1991
- Medals Ranked 21st: Gold 0 Silver 1 Bronze 0 Total 1

Pan American Games appearances (overview)
- 1951; 1955; 1959; 1963; 1967; 1971; 1975; 1979; 1983; 1987; 1991; 1995; 1999; 2003; 2007; 2011; 2015; 2019; 2023

Uruguay participated in the 11th Pan American Games, which were held in Havana, Cuba, August 2–18, 1991.

== Medals ==
=== Silver ===
===== Athletics =====
- Men's 3,000 m Steeplechase: Ricardo Vera

== Results by event ==
=== Basketball ===
==== Men's team ====
- Preliminary round (group B)

- Lost to Brazil (72–94)
- Defeated Canada (62–61)
- Lost to Puerto Rico (78–98)
- Lost to Mexico (71–74)

- Quarterfinals

- Lost to United States (68–114)

- Classification Matches

- 5th/8th place: Lost to Venezuela (79–85)
- 7th/8th place: Lost to Argentina (71–63) → 8th place

== See also ==
- Sport in Uruguay
- Uruguay at the 1992 Summer Olympics
