= 2002 Pan American Cycling Championships =

- Venue: Ecuador
- Date(s): August 18–23, 2002
- Velodrome: José Luis Recalde
- Nations participating: 9

The 2002 Pan American Cycling Championships took place at the José Luis Recalde Velodrome in Quito, Ecuador August 18–23, 2002, and served as a qualifier for the cycling events at the 2003 Pan American Games. Mexico became champion after winning six golds, four silver and one bronze medal.

== Medal summary ==
=== Road ===
==== Men ====
Event	Gold	Silver	Bronze
Individual road race	Daniel Rincón; Colombia	Ismael Sarmiento; Colombia	Héctor Chiles; Ecuador
Individual time trial	José Medina; Chile	Johnny Leal; Colombia	Carlos Ibáñez; Colombia

==== Women ====
Event	Gold	Silver	Bronze
Individual road race	Belem Guerrero; Mexico	Flor Delgadillo; Colombia	Janildes Fernandes; Brazil
Individual time trial	Sonia López; Mexico	Paola Madriñán; Colombia	Flor Delgadillo; Colombia

==== Under 23 Men ====
Event	Gold	Silver	Bronze
Individual road race	Alexis Castro; Colombia	Carlos López; Mexico	Erick Castago; Ecuador
Individual time trial	Mauricio Ortega; Colombia	Erick Castaño; Ecuador	Juan Montenegro; Ecuador

=== Track ===
==== Men ====
Event	Gold	Silver	Bronze
Sprint	Barry Forde; Barbados	Julio Herrera; Cuba	Michel Pedroso; Cuba
1 km time trial	Wilson Meneses; Colombia (PR) (Note: Wilson Meneses Set a new Pan American 1 km time trial record with 1:01.863.)	Michel Pedroso; Cuba	Julio Herrera; Cuba
Keirin	Barry Forde; Barbados	Wilson Meneses; Colombia	Steen Madsen; Canada
Scratch	Juan de la Rosa; Mexico	Marcelo Arriaga; Chile	Marcos Novello; Brazil
Points race	Mario Arriagada; Chile	Luis Sepúlveda; Chile	Hernandes Quadri; Brazil
Individual pursuit	Marco Arriagada; Chile (PR) (Note: Marco Arriagada Set a new Pan American Individual pursuit record with 4:28.205.)	Luca Barazutti; Ecuador	Mark Ernsting; Canada
Madison	Chile; Richard Rodríguez; Luis Sepúlveda	Mexico; Juan de la Rosa; José Sánchez	Uruguay; Milton Wynants; Tomás Margalef
Team sprint	Cuba; Yasmani Pol; Michel Pedroso; Reiner Cartaya	Colombia; Wilson Meneses; Jonathan Marín; Víctor Álvarez	Chile; Sebastián Muñoz; José Aravena; Enzo Cesario
Team pursuit	Chile; Richard Rodríguez; Marco Arriaga; Luis Sepúlveda; Antonio Cabrera	Brazil; Hernandes Quadri; Armando Costa; Andre Polini; Marcos Novello	Mexico; Ignacio Sarabia; José Sánchez; Luis Macías; Juan de la Rosa

==== Women ====
Event	Gold	Silver	Bronze
Sprint	Lori-Ann Muenzer; Canada (PR) (Note: Lori-Ann Muenzer Set a new Pan American Sprint record with 0:11.010.)	Yumari González; Cuba	Diana García; Colombia
500 m time trial	Yumari González; Cuba (PR) (Note: Yumari González Set a new Pan American 500 m time trial world record with 0:34.647.)	Lori-Ann Muenzer; Canada	Diana García; Colombia
Keirin	Lori-Ann Muenzer; Canada	Yumari González; Cuba	Diana García; Colombia
Individual pursuit	Belem Guerrero; Mexico	Erin Carter; Canada	Sandra Gómez; Colombia
Points race	Patricia Palencia; Mexico	Belem Guerrero; Mexico	María Parra; Ecuador
Scratch	Belem Guerrero; Mexico	Patricia Palencia; Mexico	Claudia Aravena; Chile
