= Hernandes Quadri =

Brazilian cyclist

Personal information
- Born: 8 December 1967 (age 58) Santo Antônio da Platina, Paraná, Brazil

Cycling career
- Sport: Cycling
Medal record
Representing Brazil
Pan American Games
Bronze medal – third place	1995 Mar del Plata	Team pursuit
South American Games
Silver medal – second place	2006 Buenos Aires	Madison
Pan American Championships
Gold medal – first place	2000 Bucaramanga	Points race
Silver medal – second place	2002 Quito	Team pursuit
Bronze medal – third place	1994 Curico	Points race
Bronze medal – third place	2002 Quito	Points race
Bronze medal – third place	2006 Cabreuva	Madison

Hernandes Quadri Junior (born 8 December 1967) is a retired male road cyclist from Brazil. He represented his native country at the 1992 Summer Olympics and the 1996 Summer Olympics.

== Career ==
Quadri won the team pursuit silver medal and the bronze in points race in the 2002 Pan American Championships.

== Palmares ==
1992
1st in General Classification Volta Ciclistica Internacional de Santa Catarina (BRA)
1995
1st in General Classification Volta Ciclistica Internacional de Santa Catarina (BRA)
1st in Prova Ciclística 9 de Julho (BRA)
1997
3rd in General Classification Vuelta Ciclista del Uruguay (URU)
1999
1st in Circuito Boavista (BRA)
2002
1st in Volta Do ABC Paulista (BRA)
2003
2nd in Stage 2 Volta de Goias (BRA)
1st in Brazil National Championship, Road, Elite, Brazil (BRA)
