= Mexico at the 1995 Pan American Games =

- IOC code: MEX
- NOC: Comité Olímpico Mexicano (in Spanish)

in Mar del Plata, Argentina March 12–26, 1995
- Medals Ranked 5th: Gold 23 Silver 20 Bronze 37 Total 80

Pan American Games appearances (overview)
- 1951; 1955; 1959; 1963; 1967; 1971; 1975; 1979; 1983; 1987; 1991; 1995; 1999; 2003; 2007; 2011; 2015; 2019; 2023; 2027

The 12th Pan American Games were held in Mar del Plata, Argentina from March 12 to March 26, 1995.

== Medals ==
=== Gold ===
===== Athletics =====
1. Men's 5000 meters - Armando Quintanilla
2. Men's 10000 meters -Armando Quintanilla
3. Men's Marathon - Benjamín Paredes
4. Men's 50 kilometer road walk - Carlos Mercenario
5. Women's 5000 metres - Adriana Fernandez
6. Women's 10000 metre track walk - Graciela Mendoza

===== Basque pelota =====
1. Men's 30m Frontenis - Mexico
2. Women's 30m Frontenis - Mexico
3. Open 36m Mano Singles - Mexico
4. Open 36m Mano Doubles - Mexico
5. Open Trinquete Mano - Mexico
6. Open Trinquete Mano Doubles - Mexico

===== Diving =====
1. Men's 3m Springboard - Fernando Platas
2. Men's 10m Platform - Fernando Platas

===== Equestrian =====
1. Individual dressage - Patrick Burssens
2. Team dressage - Mexico

===== Taekwondo =====
1. Men's Finweight (50 kg) - Carlos Ayala
2. Men's Flyweight (54 kg) - Rubén Palafox
3. Men's Bantamweight (58 kg) - Rafael Zúñiga
4. Men's Middleweight (83 kg) - Víctor Estrada
5. Women's Finweight (43 kg) - Liliana Aguirre
6. Women's Middleweight (70 kg) - Monica del Real

=== Silver ===
===== Athletics =====
1. Men's 20 kilometer road walk - Daniel Garcia
2. Men's 50 kilometer road walk -
3. Women's 5000 metres - María del Carmen Díaz

===== Basque pelota =====
1. Women's Trinquete Goma - Mexico
2. Open 30m Goma - Mexico
3. Open 36m Corta - Mexico

===== Bowling =====
1. Women's doubles - Georgina Serratos, Gabriela Sandoval
2. Women's All-Events - Edda Piccini

===== Canoeing =====
1. Men's C-1 1000 metres - Juan Martinez
2. Men's C-2 500 metres - Mexico
3. Women's K-1 500 metres - Erika Duron

===== Cycling =====
1. Men's Individual Time Trial (Road) - Jesús Zárate
2. Women's 3,000 m Points Race (Track) - Belem Guerrero

===== Diving =====
1. Men's 1m Springboard - Fernando Platas
2. Men's 10m Platform - Juan Acosta

===== Equestrian =====
1. Show jumping - Romandia Jaime Azcarraga
2. Team Show jumping - Mexico

===== Football =====
1. Team - Mexico

===== Rowing =====
1. Women's Lightweight coxless pair - Mexico

===== Wrestling =====
1. Men's Greco-Roman (48 kg) - Enrique Aguilar

=== Bronze ===
===== Athletics =====
1. Men's Decathlon - Alejandro Cárdenas
2. 4 x 100 meters relay - Jaime Barragán, Carlos Villaseñor, Salvador Miranda, Alejandro Cárdenas
3. Women's 10000 metres - María del Carmen Díaz
4. Women's Marathon - Emma Cabrera
5. Women's 10000 metre track walk - Francisca Martinez

===== Archery =====
1. Women's Recurve - Marisol Bretón
2. Women's Recurve 50 m - Marisol Bretón
3. Women's Recurve 60 m - Marisol Bretón
4. Women's Recurve 70 m - Marisol Bretón

===== Basque pelota =====
1. Open 36m Cuero - Mexico
2. Trinquete Cuero - Mexico

===== Bowling =====
1. Men's Singles - Marco Zepeda

===== Canoeing =====
1. Men's C-1 500 metres - Juan Martinez
2. Men's C-2 1000 metres - Mexico
3. Women's K-2 500 metres - Mexico

===== Cycling =====
1. Women's 1,000 m Sprint (Track) - Nancy Contreras
2. Women's 3,000 m Individual Pursuit (Track) - Belem Guerrero Méndez

===== Equestrian =====
1. Show jumping - Flavier Ximenez

===== Fencing =====
1. Women's Individual épée - Yolitzin Martinez

===== Racquetball =====
1. Women's doubles - Mexico
2. Women's team - Mexico

===== Rowing =====
1. Men's Lightweight quadruple sculls - Mexico
2. Men's Lightweight coxless pair - Mexico
3. Women's Lightweight single sculls - Andrea Bradstret
4. Women's Lightweight double sculls - Mexico

===== Swimming =====
1. Men's 4 × 200 m Free Relay - Oscar Sotelo, Nelson Vargas, José Castellanos, Jorge Anaya

===== Synchronized swimming =====
1. Duet - Wendy Aguilar & Lilian Leal
2. Team - Mexico

===== Taekwondo =====
1. Women's Bantamweight (51 kg) - Patricia Mariscal
2. Women's Featherweight (55 kg) - Veronica Marquez

===== Water skiing =====
1. Men's Tricks - Sergio Font
2. Women's Jump - Andrea Gaytán

===== Wrestling =====
1. Greco-Roman (57 kg) - Armando Fernández García
2. Greco-Roman (90 kg) - Mario Alberto González
