= Paola Madriñán =

Colombian cyclist

Paola Madriñan
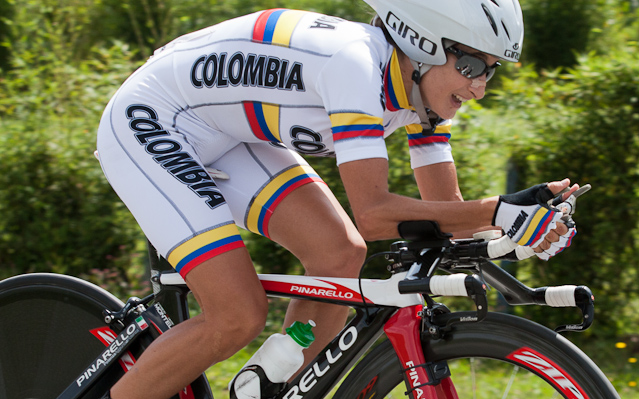
- Paola Madriñán en el Campeonato Pamanericano de Ciclismo en Ruta 2011

Personal information
- Born: Ana Paola Madriñan Villegas; 18 October 1973 (age 52) Colombia

Cycling career
- Sport: Cycling
- Discipline: Road cycling
- Role: Rider

Professional teams
- 2010: Team Valdarno Umbria
- 2014: Forno d'Asolo–Astute
Medal record
Women's road bicycle racing
Representing Colombia
Pan American Championships
Gold medal – first place	2004 Cojedes	Time trial
Gold medal – first place	2008 Montevideo	Time trial
Silver medal – second place	2002 Quito	Time trial
Silver medal – second place	2010 Aguascalientes	Time trial
Bronze medal – third place	2005 Mar del Plata	Time trial
Central American and Caribbean Games
Silver medal – second place	2002 San Salvador	Time trial

Ana Paola Madriñan Villegas (born 18 October 1973) is a road cyclist from Colombia. She won the time trial at the Pan American Road and Track Championships three times: in 2004, 2008 and 2010. in 2009 and represented her nation at the 2003, 2004 and 2007 UCI Road World Championships. She won the Colombian National Road Race Championships in 2003 and 2008.
