= Francisco Picasso =

Uruguayan swimmer (born 1982)

Personal information
- Full name: Francisco Picasso Risso
- National team: Uruguay
- Born: 19 June 1982 (age 44) Montevideo, Uruguay

Sport
- Sport: Swimming
- College team: Louisiana-Monroe (USA); Texas A&M Aggies (USA; 2006-07)

Francisco Picasso Risso (born 19 June 1982) is an Olympic and national-record holding swimmer from Uruguay. He swam for Uruguay at the 2000 and 2008 Olympics.

He has swum for Uruguay at:

- Olympics: 2000 and 2008
- World Championships: 2003, 2005, 2007
- Pan American Games: 1999, 2003, and 2007

At the 2000 Olympics, he swam the 200 Individual Medley. At the 2008 Olympics he swam the 50 freestyle.
