= Cycling at the 2004 Summer Olympics – Women's points race =

Cycling at the Olympics

Women's points race at the Games of the XXVIII Olympiad
- Venue: Olympic Velodrome

Medalists
1st place, gold medalist(s)		Olga Slyusareva	Russia
2nd place, silver medalist(s)		Belem Guerrero	Mexico
3rd place, bronze medalist(s)		María Luisa Calle	Colombia

The women's points race in cycling at the 2004 Summer Olympics consisted of a 100 lap (25 kilometre) points race with 10 sprints where points were awarded. 5 points were given to the first finisher of each sprint, with 3 going to the second-place finisher, 2 going to the third place cyclist, and 1 going to the fourth place rider. Cyclists could also score points by lapping the main body of riders, known as the peloton. 20 points were gained by doing this, while 20 points were lost if the peloton lapped the cyclist.

== Results ==
Russian sprinter and 2004 Olympics road race bronze medallist, Olga Slyusareva, was able to win three of the ten sprints, and place in four other sprints to achieve 20 points. The peloton was able to respond to any breakaways so no riders were able to achieve lap points. Mexican rider Belem Guerrero Méndez with 14 points was awarded the silver medal, closely followed by Maria Luisa Calle Williams from Colombia on 12 points. Calle Williams later tested positive for banned stimulant heptaminol, and Erin Mirabella was promoted to the bronze medal position. That decision, however, was later reversed on appeal. As a result of the IOC's 24 October 2005 decision, Mirabella was ordered to return the bronze medal and diploma and Calle's third-place result, bronze medal and diploma were reinstated.

No cyclists gained points from lapping the peloton. Three lost a lap, however.

Final results
Rank	Name	Country	Points
1st place, gold medalist(s)	Olga Slyusareva	Russia	20
2nd place, silver medalist(s)	Belem Guerrero	Mexico	14
3rd place, bronze medalist(s)	María Luisa Calle	Colombia	12
4	Erin Mirabella	United States	9
5	Vera Carrara	Italy	8
6	Sarah Ulmer	New Zealand	8
7	Gema Pascual	Spain	7
8	Katherine Bates	Australia	7
9	Katrin Meinke	Germany	5
10	Yoanka González	Cuba	5
11	Adrie Visser	Netherlands	5
12	Emma Davies	Great Britain	4
13	Sonia Huguet	France	2
14	Meifang Li	China	1
15	Lada Kozlíková	Czech Republic	0
16	Kyriaki Konstantinidou	Greece	-18
17	Kim Yong-Mi	South Korea	-19
18	Liudmyla Vypyrailo	Ukraine	-20
—	Santia Tri Kusuma	Indonesia	DNF
