= Iona Wynter =

Jamaican triathlete

Personal information
- Born: 25 November 1968 (age 57) London, England
Medal record
Women's cycling
Representing Jamaica
Central American and Caribbean Games
Gold medal – first place	2002 San Salvador	Road race
Gold medal – first place	2006 Cartagena	Scratch

Iona Wynter-Parks (née Wynter; born November 25, 1968, in London, England) is a former triathlete and cyclist from Jamaica.

Wynter-Parks was born to a Jamaican father and a German mother, and moved to Jamaica aged two. Wynter was educated at Campion College, Jamaica, the University of the West Indies, Dalhousie University, Georgia State University and Laval University, where she combined studies with triathlon training and employment, including modelling swimwear for Louis Garneau. Subsequently she secured funding from compatriot Chris Blackwell, founder of Island Records. Wynter finished 13th in the triathlon at the 1999 Pan American Games, qualifying her for the 2000 Summer Olympics. She took thirty-fourth place with a total time of 2:10:24.69.

Wynter subsequently shifted her focus to cycling. She won a gold medal in the cycling road race at the 2002 Central American and Caribbean Games. She rode on a professional U.S. cycling team sponsored by Italian olive oil company Colavita and headed by celebrated American cyclist Tina Pic. She also served as director of the Colavita team for the 2009 season. After the original Colavita team was dissolved in October 2011, she became a director of the new Colavita-espnW team established in 2012, alongside her former team-mate Pic. She was a member of the Autotrader.com team and then rode for Genesis-Scuba before entering into semi-retirement in order to balance her teaching career. She rode the 2005 season for Travel Girls and as a guest rider for the Quark Cycling Team.

She won the Central American and Caribbean Road Race Championships in 2002 and in 2006 became the Scratch Race Champion in the same Games. She has competed in the Pan American Games and the Commonwealth Games on the road and the track. She also competed in the Giro d'Italia Femminile. She hoped to compete in the 2008 Summer Olympics in Beijing, China, but failed to qualify. Only a very few athletes have qualified for the Olympic Games in two sports.

Wynter-Parks serves as first vice-president of the Jamaican Cycling Federation. She has also been the director of FieldSpa, a spa based at the Goldeneye Hotel and Resort developed on the former estate of Ian Fleming.
