= Kyriaki Konstantinidou =

Greek cyclist (born 1984)

Personal information
- Born: 30 November 1984 (age 41) Thessaloniki, Greece

Cycling career
- Sport: Cycling

Kyriaki Konstantinidou (Greek: Κυριακή Κωνσταντινίδου, born 30 November 1984) is a Greek cyclist. She competed in the women's points race at the 2004 Summer Olympics.
