= Basque pelota at the 2019 Pan American Games – Women's doubles trinquete rubber ball =

Basque pelota – women's doubles trinquete rubber ball at the 2019 Pan American Games
- Venue: Villa María del Triunfo Center
- Dates: 4–10 August
- Competitors: 12 from 6 nations

Medalists
Gold medal	Cynthia Pinto; Maria Garcia	Argentina
Silver medal	Maria Miranda; Camila Naviliat	Uruguay
Bronze medal	Paulina Castillo; Rosa Flores Buendia	Mexico

The women's doubles trinquete rubber ball basque pelota event at the 2019 Pan American Games was held from 4–10 August at the Basque pelota courts in the Villa María del Triunfo Sports Center in Lima, Peru. The Argentine team won the gold medal, after defeating Uruguay in the final.

== Results ==
=== Preliminary round ===
The preliminary stage consisted of 2 pools, where every team played the other 2 teams in the same group once. At the end of this stage, the first four teams played in the semifinals and then the winning two played a final match for the gold medal, while the losing two teams played for bronze.

==== Pool A ====
Pos	Team	Pld	W	L	PF	PA	PD	Pts
1	Argentina Cynthia Pinto Maria Garcia	2	2	0	60	19	+41	6
2	Chile Rosario Valderrama Zita Solas	2	1	1	44	56	−12	4
3	Cuba Yisley Rodríguez Yurisleidis Allué	2	0	2	32	61	−29	2

Updated to match(es) played on 18 September 2019. Source: Lima 2019

All times are local (UTC−5)

4 August; 18:11	Pinto – Garcia (Argentina)	2–0	(Cuba) Rodríguez – Allué	Villa María del Triunfo Sports Center; Referees: Leonardo Gabrie Mondada (URU)
4 August; 18:11	(15–4, 15–2); Report			Villa María del Triunfo Sports Center; Referees: Leonardo Gabrie Mondada (URU)

5 August; 16:55	Pinto – Garcia (Argentina)	2–0	(Chile) Valderrama – Solas	Villa María del Triunfo Sports Center; Referees: Andrés Emilio Caballero (CUB)
5 August; 16:55	(15–7, 15–6); Report			Villa María del Triunfo Sports Center; Referees: Andrés Emilio Caballero (CUB)

6 August; 15:05	Rodríguez – Allué (Cuba)	1-2	(Chile) Valderrama – Solas	Villa María del Triunfo Sports Center; Referees: Dardo Heber Ferreira
6 August; 15:05	(15-6, 7-15, 4-10); Report			Villa María del Triunfo Sports Center; Referees: Dardo Heber Ferreira

==== Pool B ====
Pos	Team	Pld	W	L	PF	PA	PD	Pts
1	Uruguay Maria Miranda Camila Naviliat	2	2	0	60	25	+35	6
2	Mexico Paulina Castillo Rosa Flores Buendia	2	1	1	49	35	+14	4
3	Peru Emily Paredes Karla Rodríguez	2	0	2	11	60	−49	2

Updated to match(es) played on 19 September 2019. Source: Lima 2019

All times are local (UTC−5)

4 August; 18:45	Castillo – Flores Buendia (Mexico)	0-2	(Uruguay) Miranda – Naviliat	Villa María del Triunfo Sports Center; Referees: Jorge Luis Balbi (ARG)
4 August; 18:45	(10-15, 9-15); Report			Villa María del Triunfo Sports Center; Referees: Jorge Luis Balbi (ARG)

5 August; 17:53	Castillo – Flores Buendia (Mexico)	2-0	(Peru) Paredes – Rodríguez	Villa María del Triunfo Sports Center; Referees: Alfonso Franco Romero (CHI)
5 August; 17:53	(15-5, 15-0); Report			Villa María del Triunfo Sports Center; Referees: Alfonso Franco Romero (CHI)

6 August; 16:12	Miranda – Naviliat (Uruguay)	2-0	(Peru) Paredes – Rodríguez	Villa María del Triunfo Sports Center; Referees: Alfonso Franco Romero (CHI)
6 August; 16:12	(15-5, 15-1); Report			Villa María del Triunfo Sports Center; Referees: Alfonso Franco Romero (CHI)

=== Semifinals ===
7 August; 15:02	Pinto – Garcia (Argentina)	2-0	(Mexico) Castillo – Flores Buendia	Villa María del Triunfo Sports Center; Referees: Alfonso Franco Romero (CHI)
7 August; 15:02	(15-10, 15-12); Report			Villa María del Triunfo Sports Center; Referees: Alfonso Franco Romero (CHI)

7 August; 16:01	Miranda – Naviliat (Uruguay)	2-0	(Chile) Valderrama – Solas	Villa María del Triunfo Sports Center; Referees: Rolando Antonio Casteleiro (CUB)
7 August; 16:01	(15-9, 15-10); Report			Villa María del Triunfo Sports Center; Referees: Rolando Antonio Casteleiro (CUB)

=== Bronze medal match ===
9 August; 16:27	Castillo – Flores Buendia (Mexico)	2-1	(Chile) Valderrama – Solas	Villa María del Triunfo Sports Center; Referees: Rolando Antonio Casteleiro (CUB)
9 August; 16:27	(15-11, 9-15, 10-7); Report			Villa María del Triunfo Sports Center; Referees: Rolando Antonio Casteleiro (CUB)

=== Gold medal match ===
10 August; 16:58	Pinto – Garcia (Argentina)	2-1	(Uruguay) Miranda – Naviliat	Villa María del Triunfo Sports Center; Referees: Rolando Antonio Casteleiro (CUB)
10 August; 16:58	(8-15, 15-9, 10-4); Report			Villa María del Triunfo Sports Center; Referees: Rolando Antonio Casteleiro (CUB)
