= Barry Forde =

Barbadian cyclist

Personal information
- Full name: Barry Ricardo Forde
- Born: 17 September 1976 (age 50) Saint James, Barbados

Cycling career
- Sport: Cycling
- Discipline: Track
- Role: Rider
- Rider type: Sprint
Medal record
Men's track cycling
Representing Barbados
World Championships
Silver medal – second place	2005 Los Angeles	Keirin
Bronze medal – third place	2003 Stuttgart	Keirin
Central American and Caribbean Games
Gold medal – first place	1998 Maracaibo	Sprint

Barry Ricardo Forde (born 17 September 1976) is a Barbadian former track cyclist. Forde was banned for two years and two months after testing positive for Testosterone on 28 October 2005.

He returned to competition after his ban, but Forde later failed a urine test for Erythropoietin (EPO) in September 2010. Forde was given a UCI Life Ban and as a result announced his retirement in March 2011.

He currently resides and works in Berlin Germany with his wife, interior designer Ji-Young Choi-Forde.

== Palmarès ==
2001
Pan American Championships, Medellín

Gold, Sprint

2002
2002 Pan American Championships, Quito

Gold, Keirin
Gold, Sprint

2003
World Championships, Stuttgart

Bronze, Keirin

Pan American Games

Gold, Sprint & Keirin (Disqualified)

Pan American Championships

Gold, Sprint

2005
World Championships, Los Angeles

Silver, Keirin

Pan American Championships, Mar del Plata

Gold, Keirin
Gold, Sprint

2008
World Cup

3rd, Keirin, Cali
