= 2004 UCI Track Cycling World Championships – Women's points race =

Rainbow jersey

The Women's Points Race was one of the 6 women's events at the 2004 UCI Track Cycling World Championships, held in Melbourne, Australia.

22 Cyclists from 22 countries participated in the race. Because of the number of entries, there were no qualification rounds for this discipline. Consequently, the event was run direct to the final.

== Final ==
The Final and only race was run at 19:55 on May 29. The competition consisted on 100 laps, making a total of 25 km with 10 sprints.

Elapsed Time=32:32.100 Average Speed=46.104 km/h

Rank	Name	Country	Sprint Number										Finish Order	Lap Points			Total Points
Rank	Name	Country	1	2	3	4	5	6	7	8	9	10	Finish Order	+	–	Balance	Total Points
	Olga Slyusareva	Russia	5				1	2	1	5	5		8	20		20	39
	Vera Carrara	Italy		2	1	5					3		16	20		20	31
	Belem Guerrero	Mexico				3	3			2	2		12	20		20	30
4	Sarah Ulmer	New Zealand						5	2			5	1				12
5	Li Meifang	China				1	2		5		1	3	2				12
6	Lyudmyla Vypyraylo	Ukraine			5					3			7				8
7	Katherine Bates	Australia	2	3				3					15				8
8	Hanka Kupfernagel	Germany	3			2						2	3				7
9	Adrie Visser	Netherlands			3				3				10				6
10	Marion Clignet	France					5						14				5
11	Gema Pascual	Spain	1									1	4				2
12	Lada Kozlíková	Czech Republic								1			11				1
13	Erin Mirabella	United States		1									13				1
14	Edita Kubelskienė	Lithuania											5				0
15	María Luisa Calle	Colombia											6				0
16	Eleftheria-Maria Ellinikaki	Greece											9				0
17	Santia Tri Kusuma	Indonesia											17				0
18	Yoanka González	Cuba		5	2								18		20	-20	-13
19	Mandy Poitras	Canada						1					19		20	-20	-18
DNF	Kim Yong Mi	South Korea														20	-20
DNF	Nontasin Chanpeng	Thailand														20	-20
DNF	Cherifa Adda	Algeria														20	-20
