= Uruguay at the Pan American Games =

- IOC code: URU
- NOC: Uruguayan Olympic Committee
- Website: www.cou.org.uy
- Medals Ranked 15th: Gold 14 Silver 34 Bronze 53 Total 101

Pan American Games appearances (overview)
- 1951; 1955; 1959; 1963; 1967; 1971; 1975; 1979; 1983; 1987; 1991; 1995; 1999; 2003; 2007; 2011; 2015; 2019; 2023

Uruguay at the Pan American Games.

== Pan American Games ==
=== Medals by games ===
Year	Host city	Gold	Silver	Bronze	Total
1951	Buenos Aires	0	0	0	0
1955	Mexico City	0	6	3	9
1959	Chicago	1	3	4	8
1963	São Paulo	4	1	7	12
1967	Winnipeg	0	1	4	5
1971	Cali	0	0	3	3
1975	Mexico City	0	0	2	2
1979	San Juan	0	0	0	0
1983	Caracas	1	0	2	3
1987	Indianapolis	2	2	3	7
1991	Havana	0	1	0	1
1995	Mar del Plata	1	4	3	8
1999	Winnipeg	0	1	3	4
2003	Santo Domingo	2	1	5	8
2007	Rio de Janeiro	0	1	2	3
2011	Guadalajara	0	3	2	5
2015	Toronto	1	1	3	5
2019	Lima	0	4	4	8
2023	Santiago	2	5	3	10
Total		14	34	53	101

== Junior Pan American Games ==
=== Medals by games ===
Games	Gold	Silver	Bronze	Total	Gold medals	Total medals
(Colombia) 2021 Cali-Valle	8	3	3	14	10th	10th
(Paraguay) 2025 Asunción	1	6	6	13	16th	16th
Total	9	9	9	27	13th	16th
