= Guillermo Giorgi =

Personal information
- Nationality: Uruguayan

Guillermo Giorgi is a former Uruguayan sprint canoer. He competed in the 2007 Pan American Games in his canoe. He is now the coach of his club, Escuela de Canotaje Santiago Vázquez.
