= Cycling at the 1995 Pan American Games =

This page shows the results of the cycling competition at the 1995 Pan American Games, held from March 11 to March 26, 1995, in Mar del Plata, Argentina. There were a total of eight men's and six women's events.

== Men's competition ==
=== Men's 1,000 m Sprint (Track) ===
RANK	CYCLIST
1st place, gold medalist(s)	Marty Nothstein (USA)
2nd place, silver medalist(s)	Marcelo Arrue (CHI)
3rd place, bronze medalist(s)	Gil Cordovés (CUB)

=== Men's 1,000 m Time Trial (Track) ===
RANK	CYCLIST
1st place, gold medalist(s)	Gil Cordovés (CUB)
2nd place, silver medalist(s)	Erin Hartwell (USA)
3rd place, bronze medalist(s)	Gene Samuel (TRI)

=== Men's Points Race (Track) ===
RANK	CYCLIST
1st place, gold medalist(s)	Brian Walton (CAN)
2nd place, silver medalist(s)	Milton Wynants (URU)
3rd place, bronze medalist(s)	Juán Merhed (PUR)

=== Men's 4,000 m Individual Pursuit (Track) ===
RANK	CYCLIST
1st place, gold medalist(s)	Kent Bostick (USA)
2nd place, silver medalist(s)	Walter Pérez (ARG)
3rd place, bronze medalist(s)	Brian Walton (CAN)

=== Men's 4,000 m Team Pursuit (Track) ===
RANK	CYCLIST
1st place, gold medalist(s)	United States
2nd place, silver medalist(s)	Cuba
3rd place, bronze medalist(s)	Brazil

=== Men's Individual Race (Road) ===
RANK	CYCLIST
1st place, gold medalist(s)	Brian Walton (CAN)
2nd place, silver medalist(s)	Mariano Friedick (USA)
3rd place, bronze medalist(s)	Fred Rodriguez (USA)

=== Men's Individual Time Trial (Road) ===
RANK	CYCLIST
1st place, gold medalist(s)	Clay Moseley (USA)
2nd place, silver medalist(s)	Jesús Zárate (MEX)
3rd place, bronze medalist(s)	Servando Figueredo (URU)

=== Men's Mountain Bike (MTB) ===
RANK	CYCLIST
1st place, gold medalist(s)	Tinker Juarez (USA)
2nd place, silver medalist(s)	José Andrés Brenes (CRC)
3rd place, bronze medalist(s)	Sandro Miranda (ARG)

== Women's competition ==
=== Women's 1,000 m Sprint (Track) ===
RANK	CYCLIST
1st place, gold medalist(s)	Tanya Dubnicoff (CAN)
2nd place, silver medalist(s)	Connie Paraskevin (USA)
3rd place, bronze medalist(s)	Nancy Contreras (MEX)

=== Women's 3,000 m Individual Pursuit (Track) ===
RANK	CYCLIST
1st place, gold medalist(s)	Jane Eickhoff (USA)
2nd place, silver medalist(s)	Yoanka González Pérez (CUB)
3rd place, bronze medalist(s)	Belem Guerrero Méndez (MEX)

=== Women's 3,000 m Points Race (Track) ===
RANK	CYCLIST
1st place, gold medalist(s)	Jane Eickhoff (USA)
2nd place, silver medalist(s)	Belem Guerrero (MEX)
3rd place, bronze medalist(s)	Dania Pérez (CUB)

=== Women's Individual Race (Road) ===
RANK	CYCLIST
1st place, gold medalist(s)	Jeanne Golay (USA)
2nd place, silver medalist(s)	Clara Hughes (CAN)
3rd place, bronze medalist(s)	Yacel Ojeda (CUB)

=== Women's Individual Time Trial (Road) ===
RANK	CYCLIST
1st place, gold medalist(s)	Dede Barry (USA)
2nd place, silver medalist(s)	Yacel Ojeda (CUB)
3rd place, bronze medalist(s)	Clara Hughes (CAN)

=== Women's Mountain Bike (MTB) ===
RANK	CYCLIST
1st place, gold medalist(s)	Alison Sydor (CAN)
2nd place, silver medalist(s)	Juli Furtado (USA)
3rd place, bronze medalist(s)	Jimena Florit (ARG)

== Medal table ==
Place	Nation	Gold medal	Silver medal	Bronze medal	Total
1	United States	9	4	1	14
2	Canada	4	1	2	7
3	Cuba	1	3	3	7
4	Mexico	0	2	2	4
5	Argentina	0	1	2	3
6	Uruguay	0	1	1	2
7	Chile	0	1	0	1
7	Costa Rica	0	1	0	1
9	Brazil	0	0	1	1
9	Puerto Rico	0	0	1	1
9	Trinidad and Tobago	0	0	1	1
Total		14	14	14	42
