= Belem Guerrero =

Mexican cyclist

Personal information
- Full name: Belem Guerrero Méndez
- Born: 8 April 1974 (age 52) Mexico City, Mexico

Cycling career
- Sport: Cycling
- Disciplines: Track & road
- Role: Rider
- Rider type: Endurance

Professional team
- 1999: Acca Due O
Medal record
Representing Mexico
Women's track cycling
Olympic Games
Silver medal – second place	2004 Athens	Points Race
World Championships
Silver medal – second place	1998 Bordeaux	Points Race
Bronze medal – third place	1997 Perth	Points Race
Bronze medal – third place	2001 Antwerp	Points Race
Bronze medal – third place	2004 Melbourne	Points Race
Pan American Games
Silver medal – second place	1995 Mar del Plata	Points Race
Silver medal – second place	1999 Winnipeg	Points Race
Bronze medal – third place	1995 Mar del Plata	Individual Pursuit
Central American and Caribbean Games
Gold medal – first place	2002 San Salvador	Points race
Silver medal – second place	2002 San Salvador	3000m Individual Pursuit
Silver medal – second place	2002 San Salvador	Scratch
Bronze medal – third place	2002 San Salvador	Road race
Women's road bicycle racing
Pan American Championships
Gold medal – first place	2002 Quito	Road race
Bronze medal – third place	2008 Montevideo	Road race

Belem Guerrero Méndez (born March 8, 1974, in Mexico City) is a Mexican former road and track cyclist who represented Mexico at the 2004 Summer Olympics in Athens where she won a silver medal in the Women's Points Race.

She won the points race gold and the bronze medals in 3000m Individual Pursuit and road race during the 1998 Central American and Caribbean Games, but failed the doping control with Pseudoephedrine and her medals were stripped.

== Palmarès ==
1997
3rd Points race, UCI Track Cycling World Championships

1998
2nd Points race, UCI Track Cycling World Championships

1999
2nd Points race, Round 5, Track World Cup, Cali

2001
3rd Points race, UCI Track Cycling World Championships
2nd Pan American Championships, Road, Medellin

2002
1st Pan American Championships, Road, Quito
1st Pan American Championships, Track, Individual pursuit, Quito
1st Pan American Championships, Track, Scratch, Quito
2nd Pan American Championships, Track, Points race, Quito
3rd Stage 4, Redlands Bicycle Classic
3rd Scratch race, Round 1, Track World Cup, Monterrey
1st Points race, Round 1, Track World Cup, Monterrey

2004
3rd Points race, UCI Track Cycling World Championships
2nd Points race, Round 1, Track World Cup, Moscow
3rd Points race, Round 3, Track World Cup, Manchester
2nd Points race, Summer Olympics

2007
1st Pan American Championships, Track, Points race, Valencia
2nd Pan American Games, Road, Rio de Janeiro
3rd Pan American Games, Points race, Rio de Janeiro

2008
3rd Copa Federacion Venezolana de Ciclismo
3rd Pan American Championships, Road
3rd Stage 4, Vuelta Ciclista Femenina a el Salvador, Lourdes
