= Jonathan Hall (sport shooter) =

American sport shooter

Personal information
- Born: 1 March 1988 (age 38) Birmingham, Alabama, United States

Sport
- Sport: Sport shooting
Medal record
Representing United States
Pan American Games
Silver medal – second place	2011 Guadalajara	10m air rifle

Johnathan Hall (born 1 March 1988) is an American sport shooter who competed at the 2012 Summer Olympics in the Men's 10 metre air rifle. He is the third son of Joe and Creaestia Hall, and started shooting because his two older brothers were in the sport.

The way the "Hall Boys" got started in the shooting sports is because the neighbor kid had received a BB gun for Christmas, and Jonathan's oldest brother wanted one too. when James asked their anti gun (at the time) mother if they could get a BB gun, at first she refused but then she figured she could "bore" her children out of wanting a gun by sending them to a day hunter safety education course. where Jonathan and his brothers met the Local 4-H BB program coach and it all started from there.

Jonathan's brothers are James Hall, the eldest, Joseph Hall, and Jacob Hall the "Baby boy" all of the Hall brothers shoot. James Hall is on the USAS National team for air pistol and competes in international competitions, while Joseph Hall currently shoots for the U.S. Army Marksmanship Unit (AMU) in Fort Benning, Georgia and competes in Air Rifle (.177 cal) and Smallbore (.22 cal, 3-Position). The youngest of the hall brothers, Jacob Hall, also competes with Air Pistol (.177 cal), and is currently attending Columbus Technical College in Columbus, Georgia, where he is working on his degree in Business Management.
