= Marco Zaragoza =

Mexican cyclist (born 1973)

Personal information
- Born: 25 April 1973 (age 53)

Cycling career
- Sport: Cycling

Marco Zaragoza (born 25 April 1973) is a Mexican former cyclist. He competed at the 1992 Summer Olympics and the 1996 Summer Olympics.
