= Luis Méndez (sport shooter) =

Uruguayan sports shooter (born 1959)

Personal information
- Full name: Luis Antonio Méndez Gómez
- Nationality: Uruguayan
- Born: 18 May 1959 (age 67)

Sport
- Sport: Sports shooting
Medal record
Men's shooting
Representing Uruguay
Pan American Games
Bronze medal – third place	1987 Indianapolis	Team 10 m air pistol
South American Games
Gold medal – first place	1986 Santiago	Team center fire pistol
Silver medal – second place	1986 Santiago	Small calibre standard pistol
Silver medal – second place	2006 Buenos Aires	25 m center fire pistol
Bronze medal – third place	1986 Santiago	Team free pistol

Luis Antonio Méndez Gómez (born 18 May 1959) is a Uruguayan sports shooter. He competed in the men's 10 metre air pistol event at the 2000 Summer Olympics. He won a gold, silver and bronze medal at the 1986 South American Games, then a silver medal at the 2006 edition.
