= Rudi Lausarot =

Uruguayan sport shooter (born 1975)

Personal information
- Born: April 3, 1975 (age 51) Young, Uruguay
- Height: 1.70 m (5 ft 7 in)
- Weight: 68 kg (150 lb)

Sport
- Sport: Rifle shooting
- Club: Swiss Shooting Society

Rudi Pablo Lausarot Bobenrieth (born 3 April 1975 in Young) is a Uruguayan 10 m Air Rifle sport shooter.

He competed at the 2012 Summer Olympics in the Men's 10 metre air rifle and at the 2011 Pan American Games in the Men's 10 metre air rifle.
