= Wilson Meneses =

Colombian cyclist (born 1981)

Personal information
- Born: 3 July 1981 (age 45)

Cycling career
- Sport: Cycling

Wilson Meneses (born 3 July 1981) is a Colombian cyclist. He competed in the men's track time trial at the 2004 Summer Olympics.
