= Pablo Defazio =

Uruguayan sailor (born 1981)

Pablo Defazio (born 15 May 1981) is a Uruguayan sailor. He and Mariana Foglia placed 17th in the Nacra 17 event at the 2016 Summer Olympics.
