= Milton Wynants =

Uruguayan cyclist

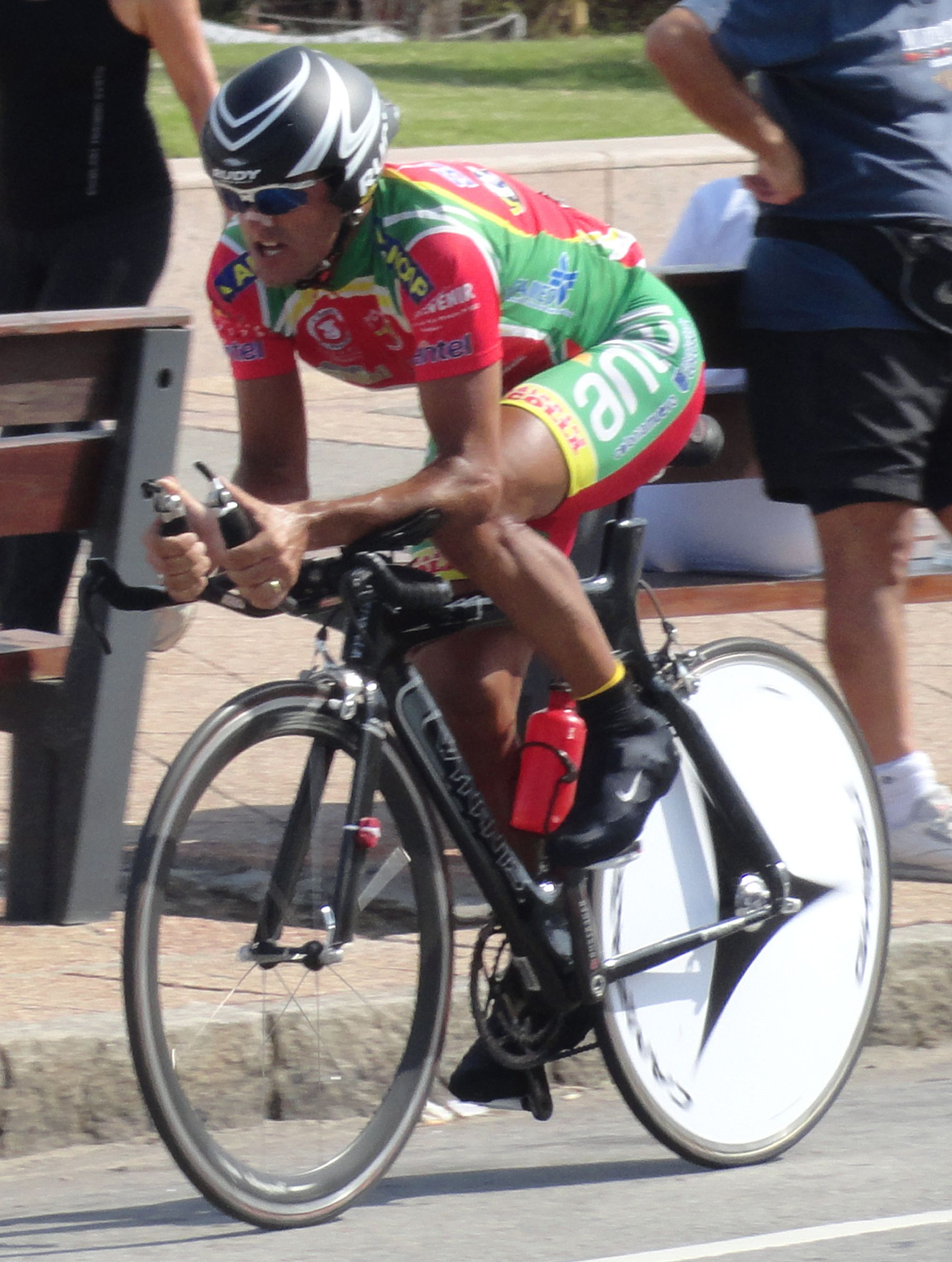
- Wynants in 2013

Personal information
- Full name: Milton Ariel Wynants Vázquez
- Born: March 29, 1972 (age 54) Paysandú, Uruguay

Cycling career
- Sport: Cycling
- Disciplines: Road and track
- Role: Rider
Medal record
Representing Uruguay
Men's track cycling
Olympic Games
Silver medal – second place	2000 Sydney	Points race
World Championships
Silver medal – second place	2004 Melbourne	Points race
Pan American Games
Gold medal – first place	2003 Santo Domingo	Points race
Silver medal – second place	1995 Mar del Plata	Points race
Bronze medal – third place	1999 Winnipeg	Points race
Bronze medal – third place	2007 Rio de Janeiro	Points race
Men's road cycling
Pan American Games
Gold medal – first place	2003 Santo Domingo	Road race

Milton Ariel Wynants Vázquez (born March 29, 1972, in Paysandú) is a racing cyclist from Uruguay, who was affiliated with the Veloz Club Sanducero.

Wynants competed in four consecutive Summer Olympics for his native country (From Atlanta 1996 to Beijing 2008). He won the silver medal in the men's points race at his second Olympic appearance, in Sydney, Australia (2000), the first Olympic medal for Uruguay in 36 years and the only one since.

He has collected medals at each Pan American Games between 1995 and 2007: silver at the Points Race that edition, bronze at the Points Race in 1999, gold at the Points Race and Individual Road Race in 2003, and bronze at the Points Race in 2007.

Wynants competed with Tomás Margalef in the 2002 Pan American Championships, winning the madison bronze medal.
