= Sport in Uruguay =

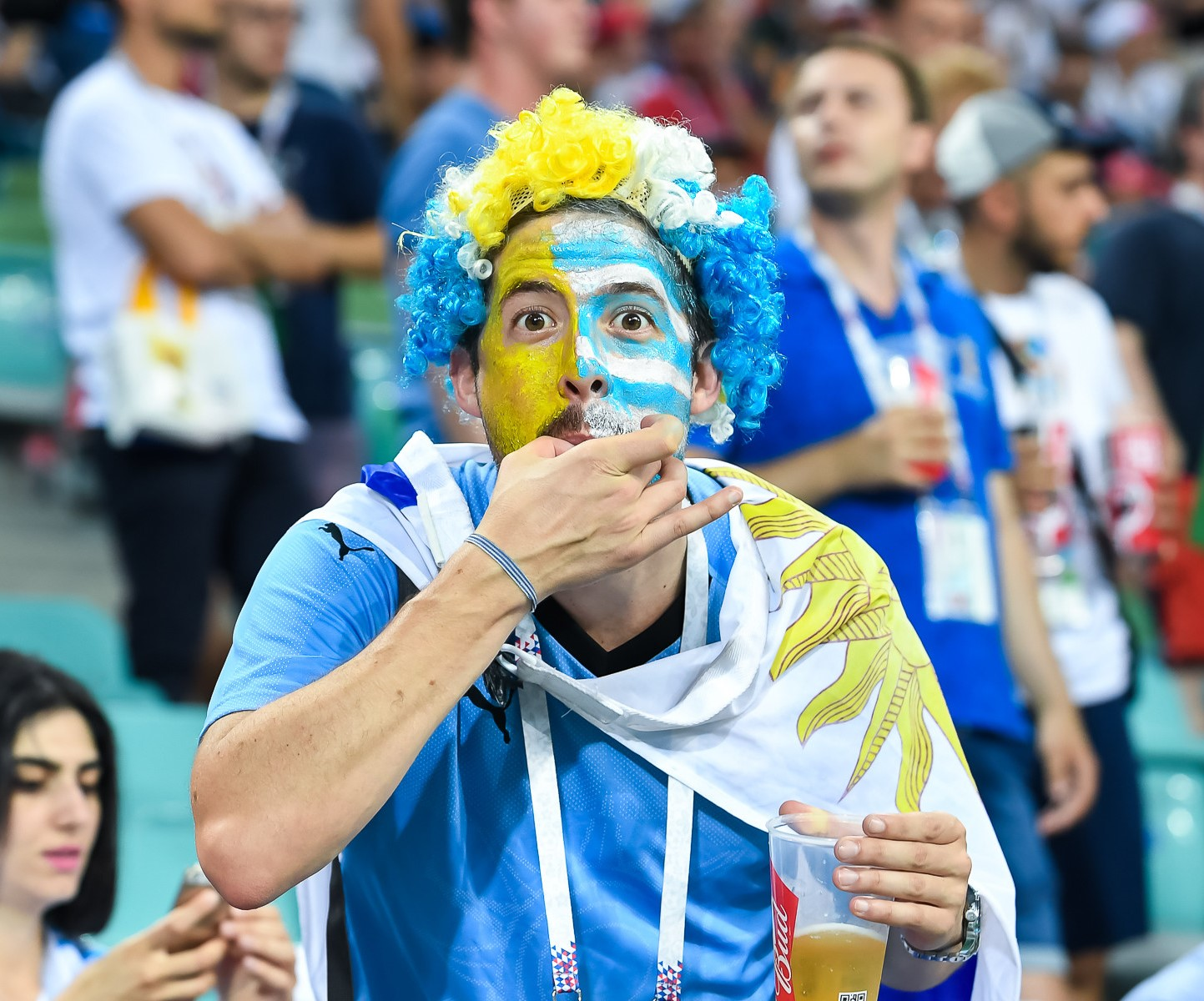
A football supporter at the 2018 FIFA World Cup.

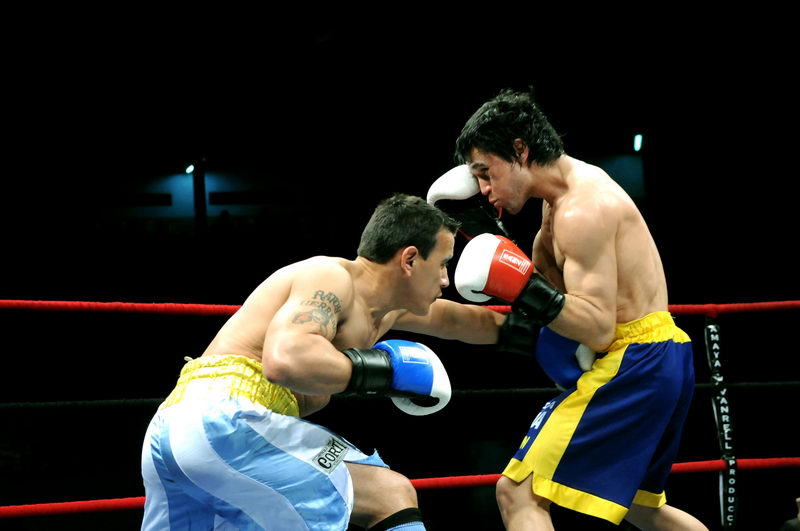
Boxing in Uruguay. 2008 World Championship.

Sport in Uruguay has been an important part of Uruguayan culture, since the early start of the nation. Winners of such important awards such as the FIFA World Cup, the French Open, and Olympic medals, Uruguay has been a constantly successful sports nation in continental and world aspects.

== Football ==
Football (Spanish: fútbol) is the most popular sport in Uruguay. Uruguay has won an Olympic gold medal in 1924, and another one in 1928, which were considered the most important tournaments in football, before the FIFA World Cup began in 1930, hence the four stars on the Uruguayan jersey. The first World Cup, which Uruguay won, was held in 1930 in Montevideo. The Estadio Centenario was built for the World Cup, and serves to this day as the country's main football stadium.

Uruguay also won the World Cup in 1950, beating Brazil in Rio de Janeiro at the Estádio do Maracanã. The event has had astounding impacts on the history of the sport, due to Brazil being a heavily favoured team at that time, and is also known as the Maracanazo.

Uruguay produces well known football players such as Luis Suárez and Diego Forlán. Another Uruguayan player, Sebastian "El Loco" Abreu, became an iconic figure in Uruguay, after chipping a goal during the penalty shootout, against Ghana during the 2010 FIFA World Cup quarter-finals.

== Basketball ==
Basketball has risen as a competitive alternative to football and rugby, and the Uruguayan Basketball Federation boasts a proud early history. The Uruguay national basketball team was placed 6th in the first Olympic Games (Berlin in 1936), 5th in London in 1948, 3rd in Helsinki in 1952, 3rd in Melbourne in 1956, 8th in Rome in 1960, and 8th in Tokyo in 1964. After this successful run, the team did not qualify as finalists in any Olympic tournament, until the 1984 Summer Olympics in Los Angeles, in which they earned 6th place. Uruguay has also won 12 South American championships, and participated in many Pan-American and World Championships. Uruguay was the host for the 1967 FIBA World Championship. And took part in a co-bid for the 2023 FIBA Basketball World Cup with Argentina but lost out to Philippines, Japan and Indonesia.

The Liga Uruguaya (Uruguay's top league) attracts many players from Argentina and Brazil. Esteban Batista is the only Uruguayan to have played in the NBA. He played seventy games over two seasons for the Atlanta Hawks.

== Cycling ==
Cycling has historical presence in Uruguayan sport dating back to the early 1900s. Current young figures within the field are Eric Fagúndez and Guillermo Thomas Silva who compete at high-level races and tournaments. Fagúndez has taken part in the 2024 Summer Olympics's cycling tournament and at the Vuelta de España. Thomas Silva has taken part in the 2026 Giro d'Italia and won stage 2.

Historical figures include, among others, Montevideo-born Alberto Domínguez, who immigrated to Australia in 1973. He had previously represented Uruguay at 1956 Summer Olympics in Melbourne and the 1959 Pan American Games in Chicago.

== Rugby union ==
With a history dating back to the 1940s, rugby union is a popular recreational sport in Uruguay. The tragic crash of Uruguayan Air Force Flight 571, and the resulting books and films, Alive: The Story of the Andes Survivors and Alive, brought Uruguayan rugby into the global limelight.

Rugby union is considered the third most popular sport in Uruguay after Football and Basketball.

The popularity of rugby increased significantly, after the national side qualified for the 1999 Rugby World Cup, and the subsequent 2003 Rugby World Cup, this saw a renewed interest in the sport and broad media coverage of the game. Uruguay secured a historic victory over a much more fancied Fiji at the 2019 Rugby World Cup, winning 30–27. This was followed by a string of strong performances against more favoured opposition.

The Uruguay national rugby union team, more commonly known as the Los Teros (southern lapwing), represent Uruguay at the international level. The team is governed by the Unión de Rugby del Uruguay, and are the second highest ranked team in South America, after Argentina, at 17th in the world.

Uruguayan rugby players such as Pablo Lemoine and Rodrigo Capó Ortega have enjoyed success in the professional European leagues.

== Motorsport ==
Four Uruguayan drivers competed in Formula Two: Eitel Cantoni, Asdrúbal Fontes Bayardo, Óscar González, and Alberto Uría. The latter two shared a ride at the 1956 Argentine Grand Prix and finished 6th. Gonzalo Rodríguez won the International Formula 3000 races at Nürburgring, Spa-Francorchamps, and Monaco, and finished 3rd in the 1998 and 1999 seasons. He got a ride in the CART World Series for Penske Racing, where he finished 12th in his debut, but was killed in a crash during practice for his second race.

Uruguay has been a major force in South American rally. The most notable driver is Gustavo Trelles, who won the FIA Group N World Cup four times straight from 1996 to 1999, finished runner-up in 1990, 2000, and 2001, and ranked 9th in the 1993 World Rally Championship season, with a best result of fourth in the Rally Argentina. The Rally del Atlántico, held in the Maldonado department, is regularly included in the South American Rally Championship.

The two major purpose-built circuits are El Pinar and Mercedes, whereas several cities have hosted street races, including Montevideo, Punta del Este, and Piriápolis. Major Argentine and South American road course championship series have raced at those places, most notably the Turismo Carretera, TC 2000, Top Race, and Formula Three Sudamericana, and also international karting and motorcycling events. Conversely, Uruguayan drivers have raced in Argentina, most recently Juan Cáceres and José Pedro Passadore.

Currently, Uruguay has national championships for road course racing (both automobiles and motorcycles), rallying, motocross, and karting. NASCAR has offered a check to Uruguay so they can race the US in the Indy 500

== Tennis ==
Tennis is a mildly popular sport in Uruguay, although Uruguayan players have not been as successful as the Argentinian and Brazilian ones. Marcelo Filippini is Uruguay's most successful player, winning five singles titles, reaching the quarterfinals at the 1999 French Open, and achieving a rank of No. 30 in 1990. The Uruguay Davis Cup team currently competes in Group I of the Americas regional Zone, and the Uruguay Fed Cup team competes in Group I as well. Pablo Cuevas is currently the second highest-ranked Uruguayan male player.

== Athletics ==
The Uruguayan Athletics Confederation is the organizing body for track and field competitions. The main venue is the Pista de Atletismo Darwin Piñeyrúa in Montevideo, named after hammer thrower Darwin Piñeyrúa. The main annual international event is the Grand Prix Darwin Piñeyrúa and Estrella Puente.

== See also ==
- Uruguay at the Olympics
