= Uruguayan Olympic Committee =

National Olympic Committee

- Country: Uruguay
- Code: URU
- Created: 1923
- Recognized: 1923
- Continental Association: PASO
- Headquarters: Montevideo, Uruguay
- President: Julio César Maglione
- Secretary General: Washington Beltran
- Website: www.cou.org.uy/cou/es/

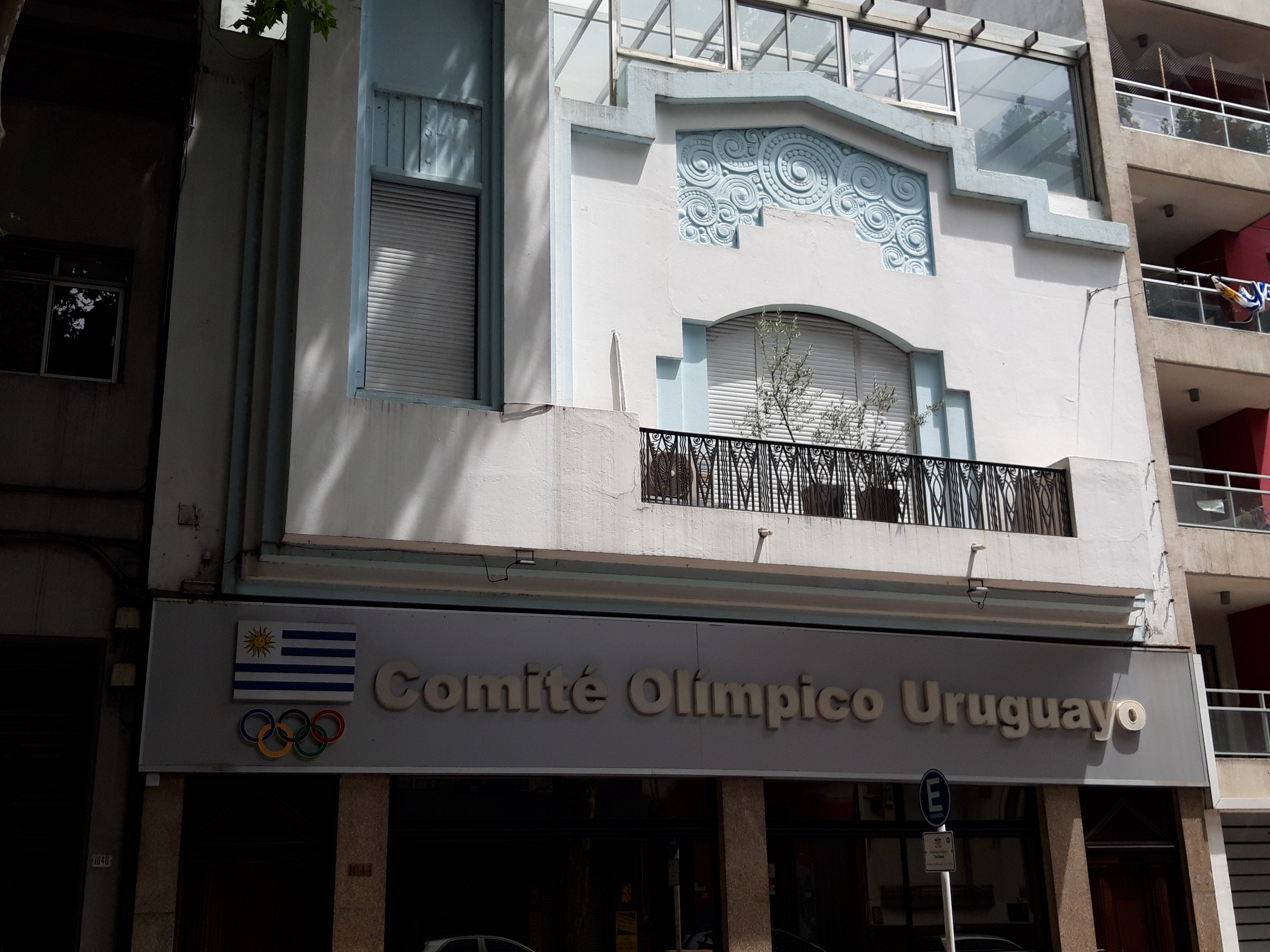
Uruguayan Olympic Committee headquarters

The Uruguayan Olympic Committee (Spanish: Comité Olímpico Uruguayo, COU) (IOC Code: URU) was founded in 1923 and was recognized by the IOC (International Olympic Committee) that same year.

It is the national governing body in charge of the Olympics. It is also a member of PASO, ACNO and ODESUR.

President is Julio César Maglione, since 198.

== See also ==
- Uruguay at the Olympics
- National Olympic Committee
