= Progressive Conservative Party of Canada candidates in the 1984 Canadian federal election =

The Progressive Conservative Party of Canada fielded a full slate of candidates in the 1984 federal election, and won 211 out of 282 seats to form a majority government. Many of the party's candidates have their own biography pages. Information on others may be found here.

== Quebec ==
=== Saint-Léonard—Anjou: Agostino Cannavino ===
Agostino Cannavino is a Montreal accountant who has worked in credit and corporate disbursements for Imperial Tobacco. In addition to his 1984 bid for federal office, he ran for a council seat in Saint-Leonard in 1982 and for a seat on the Commission scolaire Jérôme-Le Royer in 1987. He later won election to the English Montreal School Board in 2003 and re-elected in 2007. In 2009, he introduced a successful resolution that called on the commission chair's to seek action from the government of Quebec against student access to contraband cigarettes. Cannavino later said that the motion was unrelated to his private employment and was prompted by reports of easily accessible contraband on school grounds.

Electoral record
Election	Division	Party	Votes	%	Place	Winner
1982 municipal	Saint-Leonard City Council, Ward Ten	Independent	160	6.41	4/4	Pierre Paquet, Équipe du renouveau de la cité de Saint-Léonard
1984 federal	Saint-Léonard—Anjou	Progressive Conservative	23,275	39.29	2/6	Alfonso Gagliano, Liberal
1987 school board	Commission scolaire Jérôme-Le Royer, District Eleven	n/a	450	29.53	2/3	Domenico Moschella
2003 school board	English Montreal School Board, District Eighteen	n/a	415	65.87	1/2	himself
2007 school board	English Montreal School Board, District Eighteen	n/a	accl.	.	1/1	himself

== Ontario ==
=== Gord Slade (Nickel Belt) ===
A. Gordon Slade was born in Flin Flon, Manitoba. He attended McGill University on a scholarship, and received Bachelor's Degree in Engineering (Mining) in 1951. He joined Falconbridge later in the same year as a miner, and was promoted to a supervisory position three years later. He eventually rose through the ranks to become vice-president of Falconbridge Ltd. and chairman of the board for the Corporation of Falconbridge Copper, before taking early retirement in January 1984 at age 55. He briefly moved to Toronto, but returned to Nickel Belt for the 1984 election. He said that he was running because he believed "there should be more engineers and managers in politics", and expressed a belief that "anything government can do, private enterprise can do better". He denied that he was anti-union in his policies. He received 13,857 votes (31.20%), finishing second against New Democratic Party candidate John Rodriguez.

Slade was appointed to the board of Eldorado Nuclear in 1985, and was appointed as a special advisor for business development with Sedgwick Tomenson Inc. in 1988. He later served on the board of directors of Houston Lake Mining Inc. and Pelangio Mines. In 2002, he received an award from the Canadian Institute of Mining, Metallurgy and Petroleum. He has been a member of the Association of Professional Engineers of Ontario, the Prospectors & Developers Association, and the Canadian Institute of Mining & Metallurgy, as well as serving as president of the Sudbury United Way in 1987, and as chair of Sudbury's Mining Heritage Committee in 2000. He remains active with the Conservative Party of Canada in Sudbury.

== Manitoba ==
=== John Hare (Winnipeg—Birds Hill) ===
Hare is the son of Jack Hare, a Winnipeg businessman who served as the Member of Parliament for St. Boniface from 1978 to 1979. The younger Hare initially sought the Progressive Conservative nomination in St. Boniface, but lost to Leo Duguay. He received 20,644 votes (39.56%) as a candidate in Birds Hill, finishing second against New Democratic Party incumbent Bill Blaikie.

Hare is owner of the firm J.H. Hare and Associates Ltd., which sells ingredients to the livestock industry. He has been president and chief executive officer of Nutratech Inc., and in 2004 started a company called Source Life Sciences Inc. He has marketed a Canadian product called therapeutic antibodies in Southeast Asia, for the purpose of fighting E. coli and salmonella in piglets.
