= John Hare =

John Hare may refer to:

- John Hare (British Army officer) (1782–1846), Governor of Eastern District of Cape of Good Hope
- John Hare (died 1613), English MP for Horsham (UK Parliament constituency)
- Sir John Hare (MP died 1637) (1603–1637), English MP for Aylesbury 1625, Evesham 1626 and King's Lynn 1628
- John Hare, 1st Viscount Blakenham (1911–1982), British Conservative MP and government minister
- John Hare (actor) (1844–1921), British actor and theatre manager
- John Hare (bishop) (1912–1976), Anglican Bishop of Bedford
- John Hare (conservationist) (1934–2022), British explorer, author, and conservationist
- John E. Hare (born 1949), British philosopher
- John Hare, Jr., Canadian politician
- John Hare Powel (1786–1856), born John Powel Hare, American agriculturalist, politician, art collector, and philanthropist
- Jack Hare (1920–2009), Canadian politician
- Jon Hare (born 1966), British computer game designer
- John Bruno Hare (1955–2010), the founder of Internet Sacred Text Archive
