= Robert Bockstael =

Robert Bockstael may refer to:

- Robert Bockstael (politician) (1923–2017), Liberal party member of the House of Commons of Canada
- Robert Bockstael (actor) (born 1960), Canadian actor
