= Franco Magnifico =

Downtown Development Committee Chair (Winnipeg)
- In office 2005–2006
- Preceded by: Peter De Smedt
- Succeeded by: Russ Wyatt

Winnipeg City Councillor for St. Boniface
- In office 2004–2006
- Preceded by: Dan Vandal
- Succeeded by: Dan Vandal

Personal details
- Born: Winnipeg, Manitoba, Canada

Franco Gaetano Luigi Magnifico is a businessperson and politician from Winnipeg, Manitoba, Canada. He represented the St. Boniface ward on Winnipeg City Council from 2004 to 2006.

== Early life and career ==
Magnifico was born and raised in Winnipeg, and worked for Canadian National before buying the St. Boniface Hotel and Club St. Boniface bar. He worked on several campaigns for the Liberal Party before running for office himself, and was a supporter of Member of Parliament Ron Duhamel.

He criticized a Manitoba Liquor Control Commission decision that prevented him from selling alcohol during World Cup of Soccer matches 2002. The games took place in Japan and South Korea, and were broadcast during early morning hours in local time.

Magnifico was an opponent of Winnipeg's anti-smoking bylaw, and sought to provide his bar patrons with a loophole to the law in 2003. Although he enforced the ban in the bar itself, he also purchased an old yellow school bus that he parked outside his hotel as a "smoking section". Provincial inspectors later argued that the bus constituted a public indoor space and was therefore in violation of the bylaw, and issued a $1,500 fine. Magnifico initially contested the charge in court, but ultimately decided to pay the fine. He sold the bar and hotel in 2004, and has said that he considered moving to the United States to open a Tim Hortons franchise.

== City councillor ==
Magnifico ran for Winnipeg City Council in a 2004 by-election, called after sitting St. Boniface councillor Dan Vandal stepped down to run for mayor. He won an upset victory, defeating two better-known francophone candidates.

Magnifico quickly emerged as a vocal ally of newly elected Mayor Sam Katz. He supported the mayor's decision to shelve a rapid transit plan in September 2004, arguing that the money would be better spent on other priorities. In October 2004, Katz appointed Magnifico as chair of his newly formed "red tape commission". The commission's finished report was issued in June 2005 with 50 recommendations, including an overhaul of Winnipeg's entertainment tax and a plan to reduce neighbourhood conflicts over new construction projects. The entertainment tax was subsequently eliminated, and Katz reported that 15 of the 30 recommendations had been completed by January 2007.

Magnifico was also appointed to chair Winnipeg's alternate service delivery committee in June 2005. This committee was charged with streamlining some municipal services and contracting out others. In this capacity, Magnifico spearheaded a controversial move to privatize the city's garbage collection services. Katz promoted Magnifico to his executive policy committee (i.e. the municipal cabinet) in November 2005 as chair of the downtown development committee.

Following his election, Magnifico promoted a plan to turn an abandoned Canada Packers site in his ward into a major indoor recreation complex. The funding for this project never materialized, and it did not come to fruition. He also supported a controversial plan to build an OlyWest pork producing plant in the vicinity of his ward. This was unpopular with ward residents, and was abandoned when the provincial government withdrew its support. Magnifico was not aligned with any political party in this period, although he acknowledged that he was an opponent of the New Democratic Party.

Former councillor Dan Vandal challenged Magnifico in the 2006 municipal election. Magnifico was endorsed by the United Fire Fighters of Winnipeg, and was joined on door-knocking duties by Mayor Katz. The contest was expected to be close, but Vandal ultimately won by a significant margin.

== Personality ==
Magnifico was a brash and flamboyant figure on council, and was known for the energy he brought to political life. He described himself as a classic rock fan in a 2005 interview, and said that AC/DC was his favourite band.

== Electoral record ==
2006 Winnipeg municipal election: City Councillor, St. Boniface Ward
Candidate	Votes	%
Dan Vandal	9,785	56.70
(x)Franco Magnifico	6,989	40.49
Murray Cliff	485	2.81
Total valid votes	17,259	100.00

Winnipeg municipal by-election, June 22, 2004: Councillor, St. Boniface
Candidate	Votes	%
Franco Magnifico	7,610	38.22
Roland Marcoux	5,798	29.12
Tom Scott	2,003	10.06
Émile Chartier	1,737	8.72
Marcel Boille	1,071	5.38
Murray Cliff	1,040	5.22
Derek W.J. Hay	653	3.28
Total valid votes	19,912	100.00
