= Fernand Viau =

Canadian politician

Member of Parliament for Saint Boniface
- In office June 1945 – June 1957
- Preceded by: John Power Howden
- Succeeded by: Louis Deniset

Personal details
- Born: 24 May 1909 Montreal, Quebec, Canada
- Died: 3 June 2000 (aged 91)
- Party: Liberal
- Profession: Military

Fernand Viau (24 May 1909 – 3 June 2000) was a Liberal party member of the House of Commons of Canada. He was born in Montreal, Quebec and had a military career.

== Background ==
He was first elected at the Saint Boniface riding in the 1945 general election, then re-elected for successive terms there in 1949 and 1953. Viau lost the Liberal party nomination for Saint Boniface for the 1957 election to Louis Deniset. Viau then campaigned in the riding as an Independent Liberal but was defeated by Deniset.

Viau died on 3 June 2000.

== Electoral record ==
1957 Canadian federal election: St. Boniface
Party	Candidate	Votes	%	±%
Liberal	Louis Deniset	7,777	31.13	-12.12
Co-operative Commonwealth	Nicholas Manchur	6,216	24.88	-5.03
Progressive Conservative	Laurier Régnier	6,040	24.18	-2.65
Social Credit	Dollard Lafrenière	3,872	15.50	
Independent Liberal	Fernand Viau	1,074	4.30	
Total valid votes		24,979	100.0	
Liberal hold		Swing		-3.55

1953 Canadian federal election: Saint Boniface—Saint Vital
Party	Candidate	Votes	%	±%
Liberal	Fernand Viau	8,051	43.3	-14.1
Co-operative Commonwealth	Leonard S. Evans	5,568	29.9	+0.9
Progressive Conservative	George Campbell MacLean	4,994	26.8	+13.2
Total valid votes		18,613	100.0	

1949 Canadian federal election: Saint Boniface—Saint Vital
Party	Candidate	Votes	%	±%
Liberal	Fernand Viau	10,766	57.3	+20.4
Co-operative Commonwealth	Andrew Russell Paulley	5,455	29.0	-0.4
Progressive Conservative	Louis Léger	2,557	13.6	-7.3
Total valid votes		18,778	100.0	

1945 Canadian federal election: Saint Boniface—Saint Vital
Party	Candidate	Votes	%	±%
Liberal	Fernand Viau	6,055	37.0	-14.8
Co-operative Commonwealth	Évariste-Rupert Gagnon	4,823	29.4	+18.1
Progressive Conservative	George Campbell MacLean	3,421	20.9	-2.5
Social Credit	Charles Anderson Bailey	1,369	8.4	-3.7
Labor–Progressive	Jules Jerome Pynoo	710	4.3	
Total valid votes		16,378	100.0	
