= Joseph-Philippe Guay =

Canadian politician

The Honourable Joseph-Philippe Guay PC

Member of Parliament for St. Boniface
- In office 1968–1978
- Preceded by: Roger Teillet
- Succeeded by: Jack Hare

Canadian Senator from Manitoba
- In office 1978–1990
- Appointed by: Pierre Trudeau

Personal details
- Born: October 4, 1915 St. Vital, Manitoba, Canada
- Died: July 30, 2001 (aged 85)
- Party: Liberal

Joseph-Philippe Guay, PC (October 4, 1915 – July 30, 2001) was a Canadian politician. He served as a Liberal Party member of parliament (MP) for the riding of St. Boniface in the House of Commons of Canada. He was later appointed to the Senate of Canada.

== Early life and career ==
Born in St. Vital, Manitoba, Guay was an alderman and mayor of Saint-Boniface, Manitoba before turning to federal politics. He won the St. Boniface Liberal nomination in the buildup to the 1968 federal election over the sitting member, cabinet minister Roger-Joseph Teillet. Guay campaigned on the fact that he, unlike Teillet, had supported Pierre Elliott Trudeau on every ballot of the 1968 Liberal Party of Canada leadership convention. He was returned in the general election, and was re-elected in 1972 and 1974.

He held numerous parliamentary functions including: Parliamentary Secretary to the Minister of Transport (1972–1974), Parliamentary Secretary to the Minister of Regional Economic Expansion (1974–1975), Chief Government Whip (1975–1977), Minister of State (Multiculturalism) (1977), Minister without Portfolio (1976–1977), and Minister of National Revenue (1977–1978).

In 1978, he was appointed to the Senate representing the senatorial division of St. Boniface, Manitoba. He retired on his 75th birthday in 1990.

In 1957, he was knighted as a member of the Order of Saint Gregory the Great by Pope Pius XII.

== Electoral history ==
1974 Canadian federal election: Saint Boniface—Saint Vital
Party	Candidate	Votes	%	±%
Liberal	Joseph-Philippe Guay	21,853	42.6	-1.9
Progressive Conservative	Jack Hare	18,604	36.2	+10.1
New Democratic	Jim Garwood	10,364	20.2	-7.5
Social Credit	Thomas L. Cruickshank	536	1.0	-0.2
Total valid votes		51,357	100.0	

1972 Canadian federal election: Saint Boniface—Saint Vital
Party	Candidate	Votes	%	±%
Liberal	Joseph-Philippe Guay	22,200	44.4	-7.3
New Democratic	Joseph F. Sherwood	13,857	27.7	+0.6
Progressive Conservative	Peter Hillcoff	13,033	26.1	+7.2
Social Credit	Gilles J. Ouellet	643	1.3	-0.9
Independent	Russ Maley	241	0.5	
Total valid votes		49,974	100.0	

1968 Canadian federal election: Saint Boniface—Saint Vital
Party	Candidate	Votes	%	±%
Liberal	Joseph-Philippe Guay	22,032	51.7	+9.9
New Democratic	Harry Shafransky	11,566	27.2	+0.4
Progressive Conservative	Vaughan L. Baird	8,048	18.9	-12.6
Social Credit	Georges Forest	949	2.2	
Total valid votes		42,595	100.0	
