= Raymond Simard =

Canadian politician

The Honourable Raymond Simard PC

Member of Parliament for Saint Boniface
- In office May 13, 2002 – October 14, 2008
- Preceded by: Ronald Duhamel
- Succeeded by: Shelly Glover

Personal details
- Born: March 8, 1958 (age 68) Ste. Anne, Manitoba, Canada
- Party: Liberal
- Spouse: Marguerite Desrosiers
- Education: Université de Saint-Boniface (BA); University of Manitoba (BCom)

Raymond Simard, PC (born March 8, 1958) is a former Canadian politician. A member of the Liberal Party of Canada, he was first elected to the House of Commons in a 2002 by-election triggered by the resignation of Ron Duhamel. He served as the member of Parliament (MP) for Saint Boniface until his defeat in the 2008 federal election. He was defeated for the second time in the 2011 federal election.

Simard was born in Ste. Anne, Manitoba. He holds a Bachelor of Arts degree from the College universitaire de Saint-Boniface, as well as a Bachelor of Commerce degree from the University of Manitoba. Simard worked as a businessman and consultant before entering political life, initially for a number of business concerns owned by his family. In 2002, sitting Saint Boniface MP Ron Duhamel was appointed to the Senate of Canada by Prime Minister Jean Chrétien. Simard was selected as the Liberal candidate for the resulting by-election, and on May 13, 2002, he defeated Canadian Alliance candidate Denis Simard by about 4400 votes.

== Electoral history ==
2011 Canadian federal election: Saint Boniface—Saint Vital
Party	Candidate	Votes	%	±%	Expenditures
Conservative	Shelly Glover	21,737	50.3	+4.0	$84,354.60
Liberal	Raymond Simard	13,314	30.8	-4.3	$82,059.23
New Democratic	Patrice Miniely	6,935	16.0	+2.9	$1,082.97
Green	Marc Payette	1,245	2.9	-2.1	$950.00
Total valid votes/expense limit		43,231	100.0		–
Total rejected ballots		181	0.4	+0.1	
Turnout		43,412	67.18	+2.86	
Eligible voters		64,620	–	–	

2008 Canadian federal election: Saint Boniface—Saint Vital
Party	Candidate	Votes	%	±%	Expenditures
Conservative	Shelly Glover	19,440	46.3	+11.3	$71,480
Liberal	Raymond Simard	14,728	35.1	-3.5	$78,353
New Democratic	Matt Schaubroeck	5,502	13.1	-8.8	$12,641
Green	Marc Payette	2,104	5.0	+1.2	$8,506
Christian Heritage	Justin Gregoire	195	0.5	-0.2	$12
Total valid votes/expense limit		41,969	100.0		$79,503
Total rejected ballots		133	0.3	-0.1	
Turnout		42,102	64.32	-1.6	

2006 Canadian federal election: Saint Boniface—Saint Vital
Party	Candidate	Votes	%	±%	Expenditures
Liberal	Raymond Simard	16,417	38.6	-8.0	$72,056
Conservative	Ken Cooper	14,893	35.0	4.0	$57,276
New Democratic	Mathieu Allard	9,311	21.9	+3.9	$23,405
Green	Marc Payette	1,640	3.9	+1.5	$4,830
Christian Heritage	Jane MacDiarmid	285	0.7	-0.3	$503
Total valid votes		42,546	100.0		–
Total rejected ballots		163	0.4	0.0	
Turnout		42,709	66.9	+6.2	

2004 Canadian federal election: Saint Boniface—Saint Vital
Party	Candidate	Votes	%	±%	Expenditures
Liberal	Raymond Simard	17,989	46.6	+3.8	$64,019
Conservative	Ken Cooper	11,956	31.0	-8.1	$71,843
New Democratic	Mathieu Allard	6,954	18.0	+3.0	$9,928
Green	Daniel Backé	925	2.4	–	$202
Christian Heritage	Jeannine Moquin-Perry	378	1.0	0.0	$7,690
Marijuana	Chris Buors	317	0.8	-1.3	–
Communist	Gérard Guay	77	0.2	–	$654
Total valid votes		38,596	100.0		–
Total rejected ballots		130	0.3		
Turnout		38,726	60.7		

Canadian federal by-election, 13 May 2002
Party	Candidate	Votes	%	±%
On Mr. Duhamel being called to the Senate, 15 January 2002
Liberal	Raymond Simard	8,862	42.8	-9.3
Alliance	Denis Simard	4,497	21.7	-1.4
Progressive Conservative	Mike Reilly	3,583	17.3	5.7
New Democratic	John Parry	3,106	15.0	+2.0
Marijuana	Chris Buors	435	2.1	
Christian Heritage	Jean-Paul Kabashiki	210	1.0	
Total valid votes		20,693	100.0	
