= Dan Vandal =

Canadian politician

The Honourable Dan Vandal PC
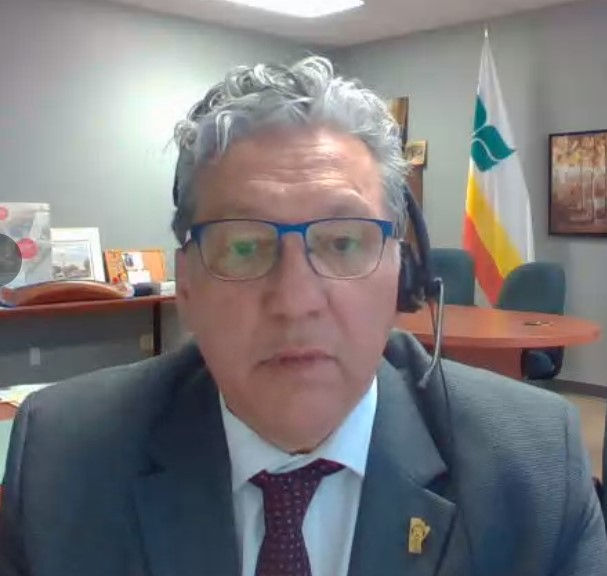

Minister responsible for Prairies Economic Development Canada
- In office October 26, 2021 – December 20, 2024
- Prime Minister: Justin Trudeau
- Preceded by: Position established
- Succeeded by: Terry Duguid

Minister responsible for the Canadian Northern Economic Development Agency
- In office October 26, 2021 – December 20, 2024
- Prime Minister: Justin Trudeau
- Preceded by: Position established
- Succeeded by: Gary Anandasangaree

Minister of Northern Affairs
- In office November 20, 2019 – December 20, 2024
- Prime Minister: Justin Trudeau
- Preceded by: Dominic LeBlanc
- Succeeded by: Gary Anandasangaree

Member of Parliament for Saint Boniface—Saint Vital
- In office October 19, 2015 – March 23, 2025
- Preceded by: Shelly Glover
- Succeeded by: Ginette Lavack

Mayor of Winnipeg
- Acting
- In office May 11, 2004 – May 14, 2004
- Preceded by: Glen Murray
- Succeeded by: Jae Eadie (acting); Sam Katz

Winnipeg City Councillor
- In office November 7, 2006 – November 4, 2014
- Preceded by: Franco Magnifico
- Succeeded by: Matt Allard
- Constituency: St. Boniface
- In office November 7, 1995 – May 14, 2004
- Preceded by: Evelyne Reese
- Succeeded by: Franco Magnifico
- Constituency: St. Boniface

Personal details
- Born: April 18, 1960 (age 66) Winnipeg, Manitoba, Canada
- Party: Liberal (2014–present)
- Other political affiliations: New Democratic (c. 1995–2014)
- Education: University of Manitoba (BSW)
- Occupation: Politician; Social worker

Daniel Vandal PC (born April 18, 1960) is a Canadian politician. He represented St. Boniface on the Winnipeg City Council from 1995 to 2004 and from 2006 to 2014, and ran unsuccessfully for mayor of Winnipeg in 2004, coming in second to Sam Katz. He briefly served as acting mayor of Winnipeg following Glen Murray's resignation. On October 19, 2015, he was elected as the member of Parliament for Saint Boniface—Saint Vital in the House of Commons of Canada. He is a member of the Liberal Party of Canada and served as the Federal Minister of Northern Affairs in Justin Trudeau's cabinet. On October 26, 2021, he was also named Minister responsible for the Canadian Northern Economic Development Agency and Minister responsible for the Prairies Economic Development Agency of Canada, positions he held until 2024. He did not seek re-election in 2025.

== Early life and career ==
Vandal was born on April 18, 1960 in Winnipeg, the youngest of eight children. His family identified as French Canadian during his youth, and he only became aware of his Métis heritage in later life.

Vandal dropped out of high school, and was a manual labourer for part of his teenage years. He started boxing at age 15, turned professional in 1978, and was the #1 ranked Canadian middleweight in 1983. The following year, he fought Alex Hilton for the Canadian title in front of 18,000 fans at the Montreal Forum. He later credited boxing for turning his life around.

Vandal subsequently became a youth worker at Winnipeg's Mamawiwichiitata Centre, and received a degree in Social Work from the University of Manitoba. He was vice-president of the Old St. Boniface Residents Association in the 1990s, and campaigned against the proposed construction of a stadium for Sam Katz's Winnipeg Goldeyes baseball team in Whittier Park.

== City councillor ==
Thompson administration

Vandal was elected to the Winnipeg City Council in the 1995 municipal election, winning an upset victory over incumbent councillor Evelyne Reese in the St. Boniface Ward. He was associated with the left-leaning Winnipeg in the '90s (WIN) group, which also included councillors Glen Murray and Lillian Thomas. In 1996, Vandal and Murray served on an ad hoc social services committee that held a series of public hearings on federal and provincial welfare cuts. He later saved the Pointe Hebert neighbourhood in his ward from being turned into parkland, and was chosen to sit on the city's newly formed property and development committee in November 1997.

Vandal was a frequent opponent of Mayor Susan Thompson during his first term, and voted against several of Thompson's major initiatives. He opposed a 2% salary rollback for municipal employees in 1996, and later opposed the dissolution of the Winnipeg Housing Rehabilitation Corporation, which provided public housing. In 1997, he voted against a proposal to allow Sam Katz to build a new baseball stadium for the Goldeyes on a city-owned site at The Forks. Vandal's position was that the project was not financially viable, and that Katz would later return to the city for more money. The initiative nonetheless passed, and CanWest Global Park opened in 1999.

In February 1997, Vandal introduced a motion to create a municipal aboriginal affairs committee that would address issues of crime prevention and health. He later represented Winnipeg on an aboriginal subcommittee of the Manitoba Round Table on Environment and Economy.

Murray administration

The WIN organization was dissolved after the 1995 election. Vandal was re-elected in the 1998 municipal election as an independent with support from the Winnipeg Labour Council and the New Democratic Party, of which he was a member at the time. Glen Murray was elected Mayor of Winnipeg in this campaign, and appointed Vandal to his executive policy committee (i.e. the municipal cabinet) as chair of the protection and community services committee, which oversees Winnipeg's police, fire and hospital services. Vandal also led a task force charged with improving francophone services in the city, and was one of three council representatives on the board of Winnipeg Enterprises Corp.

Chair of the Protection and Community Services Committee

Murray's administration was often at odds with Gary Doer's provincial government in early 2000 over Winnipeg's ambulance services. Murray and Vandal argued that the city's share of the cost, about $2.5 million per year, should be assumed by the province. Doer initially disagreed, and the issue was unresolved for several months. In July 2000, the city and the province announced a deal with the Winnipeg Regional Health Authority to provide five new ambulances and thirty new paramedics, with a ceiling on municipal costs. Vandal said that he was very pleased with the outcome.

Vandal promoted a plan to turn over some police responsibilities to civilian control in 1999, both to reduce costs and to free up more officers for front-line duty. He later supported a plan to introduce photo radar to catch speeding drivers, and endorsed a 2000 report that called for three fire stations to be closed to provide increased funding for paramedic services. Vandal argued that overall fire services would not be affected, as a smaller number of stations could oversee the city. Later in the year, he announced $445,000 in new money to combat a growing problem of arson.

Chair of the Property and Development Committee

Murray shuffled the executive policy committee on October 30, 2000, and moved Vandal to the chairmanship of Winnipeg's property and development committee. Soon after his appointment, he helped bring about the demolition of an abandoned Canada Packers site in his ward. The site had been regarded as an eyesore for many years, and was a frequent target for arsonists.

Vandal was chair of the property and development committee when Wal-Mart announced that it had found suitable land for a new establishment in north Winnipeg. This came two years after the company lost a political battle to construct a store in a separate area of the same neighbourhood. Vandal argued that this announcement validated council's decision to reject the initial application, which he said would have cost the city an extra $20 million.

Vandal was again endorsed by the Winnipeg Labour Council for the 2002 municipal election. No challengers came forward, and Vandal was returned to council by acclamation. Glen Murray was elected to a second term as mayor, and Vandal was kept as chair of the property and development committee after the election. In 2003, he helped oversee the beginnings of a new subdivision in Waverley West.

Aboriginal issues

Vandal said that he wanted to make aboriginal issues the top priority of his third term in office, and was subsequently the primary author of a 15-point strategy to combat poverty among Winnipeg's aboriginal community. The strategy was highlighted by a plan to create urban reserves, and to provide increased municipal support for aboriginal ventures. The final version of the Municipal Aboriginal Pathways strategy was officially unveiled in September 2003.

Other issues

Vandal believed that St. Boniface could be developed as a vibrant French Quarter for Winnipeg, and supported tax credits as a means of encouraging this outcome. He also supported a plan to increase the area's population, arguing that this would bring about improvements in other fields.

Vandal was the only member of Murray's cabinet to support a compromise with local anti-poverty groups to remove the most contentious aspects of an anti-panhandling by-law in 1999. He supported funding for downtown festivals as a means of boosting tourism, and helped approve $200,000 to this end in 2000. He was the first cabinet member to favour a total indoor smoking ban in public places, and supported Winnipeg's landmark smoking ban in 2002.

In May 2002, Vandal represented the mayor and council for the raising of a gay pride flag at city hall. He said that he hoped the flag would encourage a spirit of tolerance.

There were rumours that Vandal would run as a candidate of the Liberal Party of Canada in a federal by-election in St. Boniface in 2002, but he declined to pursue the option. He later took part in a major Winnipeg protest against the 2003 invasion of Iraq.

Deputy Mayor

Vandal was promoted to Deputy Mayor of Winnipeg in a November 2003 cabinet shuffle, while remaining chair of the property and development committee and receiving additional responsibility for implementing the city's aboriginal strategy. Many pundits saw this as evidence that Murray was preparing Vandal to become his successor as mayor. In 2004, Vandal indicated his support for Prime Minister Paul Martin's plan to divert a portion of Canada's Goods and Services Tax revenue to municipal infrastructure.

In late 2003, Vandal requested that hockey legend and franchise owner Mario Lemieux consider bringing the Pittsburgh Penguins to Winnipeg. This was considered to be a longshot offer, and was not successful. Vandal later indicated that Winnipeg was contacted by a "Sun Belt" hockey franchise that was considering a move to Winnipeg, although this too never came to fruition. It was later revealed that the team in question was the Tampa Bay Lightning.

In late April 2004, Vandal was appointed to a steering committee on the development of Manitoba's capital region.

== Mayoral campaign ==
Glen Murray announced his resignation as mayor of Winnipeg on May 11, 2004, stepping down in mid-term to run for a seat in the House of Commons of Canada. Vandal served as acting mayor until May 14, when he resigned his St. Boniface seat to officially seek election as Murray's successor. He appointed Jae Eadie to the position of deputy mayor before resigning, which meant that Eadie served as acting mayor during the campaign.

Vandal ran on his record of accomplishment in Glen Murray's administration, while indicating that he would run the city in a different style. He promised $4.4 million annually in new spending, a downtown housing tax credit and productivity reinvestment tax credit, doubling the city's arts funding, and the creation of a new municipal holiday to celebrate the city's heritage. His campaign launch was introduced by Tina Keeper, and his supporters included John Angus, Jenny Gerbasi, Lillian Thomas and Mary Richard, as well as the Winnipeg Labour Council and local anti-poverty activists. Despite a strong start, his campaign was hurt by the late entry of MaryAnn Mihychuk, whose candidacy split the centre-left vote. Some argued that Vandal also had difficulty presenting himself as a strong leader. He ultimately finished second against Sam Katz.

Shortly after the election, Vandal was hired by the province to administer a $75 million urban development agreement for Winnipeg's inner city. He later became a project officer with the aboriginal affairs committee of the provincial cabinet.

== Return to city council ==
Vandal was re-elected to the Winnipeg City Council for St. Boniface in the 2006 municipal election over incumbent Franco Magnifico, who had taken the seat after Vandal stepped down in 2004. The contest was expected to be close, but Vandal won by a significant margin. By this time, he once again identified as a member of the New Democratic Party. Sam Katz was re-elected as mayor.

Vandal was appointed to the Winnipeg Housing Steering Committee in March 2007, and also sits on the property and planning committee. In early 2007, he wrote an opinion piece for the Winnipeg Free Press calling for a reduction in property taxes rather than the business tax cut favoured by Katz. He argued that a business tax cut would drive up property rates, citing precedents in several other North American cities. Vandal has also criticized Katz and council for not moving forward with educational and employment opportunities for aboriginal youth, despite having allocated funds for such programs.

Vandal emerged as one of Sam Katz's most prominent council opponents in late 2007 and 2008. He was a vocal critic of Katz's water and sewer rate increases in late 2007, and accused the mayor of diverting the increased funds into general revenue to pay for his business tax cuts. (Following criticism, Katz agreed to stop the funding diversion by 2009. Some political observers described this as the first serious setback to Katz's control over council after the 2006 election.) Vandal later opposed Katz's plan for a private-public partnership to repair Winnipeg's Disraeli Bridge and Freeway.

Vandal called for a public inquiry into the finances Riverside Park Management in late 2008, after the city erased $233,000 from the organization's back taxes. The Riverside group is closely linked to Katz's baseball team, and Vandal and others have raised concerns about a potential conflict-of-interest situation and Riverside's status as a non-profit organization.

In late 2007, Vandal helped create a new city park named after Elzéar Goulet, who was a member of Louis Riel's provisional government in 1869-70. He later helped preserve a provincial historical site at Upper Fort Garry against opposition from Mayor Katz and developers.

As one of his last acts as councillor in September 2014, Vandal instigated a two part motion to address the plight of abducted vulnerable women nationwide, particularly Native women. The motion calls for: the city to support the growing nationwide body of advocates including party leaders and advocates and Winnipeg, and provincial governments demanding a Federal inquiry into the plight of abducted and murdered women. The motion also calls for greater support for the Winnipeg Police to protect and socially support the recovery of vulnerable women of Winnipeg. The motion was passed with a vote of 14–1 on September 24, 2014 and Winnipeg the first major municipality to join the body of advocates. Outgoing mayor Sam Katz amended the proposition to include $150K to support an aboriginal youth drop in center. Vandal believes that this position will help open a dialog and advocate for the reforms to enhance protection of vulnerable women by giving them a voice.

== Federal politics ==
Vandal stated that he would not run for re-election in 2014 and would instead run as the federal Liberal candidate in Saint Boniface—Saint Vital in the next federal election. Within a day of the writ drop, Vandal was endorsed by the United Fire Fighters of Winnipeg president Alex Forrest.

Having represented most of the territory covered by the riding for the better part of two decades, Vandal was considered a strong candidate. His chances significantly increased when Conservative incumbent Shelly Glover announced she would not run for reelection. While Glover had held the riding for two terms, it was ancestrally a Liberal one. Vandal won easily as part of the Liberals' near-sweep of Winnipeg, and was reelected almost as easily in 2021.

He is the current Minister of Northern Affairs and Minister responsible for two Regional Development Agencies: the Canadian Northern Economic Development Agency (CanNor) and the Prairies Economic Development Agency of Canada (PrairiesCan).

== Electoral record ==
=== Federal ===
2021 Canadian federal election: Saint Boniface—Saint Vital
Party	Candidate	Votes	%	±%	Expenditures
Liberal	Dan Vandal	19,908	43.8	+1.0	$57,062.60
Conservative	Shola Agboola	12,749	28.0	-4.6	$84,279.53
New Democratic	Meghan Waters	9,767	21.5	+4.6	$13,895.44
People's	Jane MacDiarmid	1,978	4.4	+3.2	$0.00
Green	Laurent Poliquin	676	1.5	-4.1	$1,459.10
Rhinoceros	Sébastien CoRhino	80	0.2	N/A	$0.00
Independent	Scott A. A. Anderson	58	0.1	N/A	$0.00
Independent	Naomi Crisostomo	31	0.1	N/A	$0.00
Independent	Kerri Hildebrandt	31	0.1	N/A	$0.00
Independent	Charles Currie	25	0.1	N/A	$0.00
Independent	Jean-Denis Boudreault	24	0.1	N/A	$0.00
Independent	Patrick Strzalkowski	21	<0.1	N/A	$0.00
Veterans Coalition	Matthew Correia	17	<0.1	N/A	$0.00
Independent	Denis Berthiaume	16	<0.1	N/A	$0.00
Independent	Tomas Szuchewycz	15	<0.1	N/A	$0.00
Independent	Alexandra Engering	14	<0.1	N/A	$0.00
Independent	Scott Falkingham	14	<0.1	N/A	$0.00
Independent	Ryan Huard	14	<0.1	N/A	$0.00
Independent	Eliana Rosenblum	13	<0.1	N/A	$0.00
Independent	Manon Lili Desbiens	11	<0.1	N/A	$0.00
Independent	Conrad Lukawski	7	<0.1	N/A	$0.00
Total valid votes/expense limit		45,469	99.2	–	$106,281.08
Total rejected ballots		379	0.8		
Turnout		45,848	66.3		
Eligible voters		69,204			
Liberal hold		Swing		+2.8	
Source: Elections Canada

2019 Canadian federal election: Saint Boniface—Saint Vital
Party	Candidate	Votes	%	±%	Expenditures
Liberal	Dan Vandal	20,300	42.88	-15.56	$44,810.61
Conservative	Rejeanne Caron	15,436	32.61	+3.92	$74,515.57
New Democratic	Billie Cross	8,037	16.98	+6.39	none listed
Green	Ben Linnick	2,671	5.64	+3.35	$2,073.90
People's	Adam McAllister	591	1.25		$4,426.19
Independent	Sharma Baljeet	303	0.64		none listed
Total valid votes/expense limit		47,338	99.43		
Total rejected ballots		269	0.57	+0.25	
Turnout		47,607	69.37	-4.61	
Eligible voters		68,631			
Liberal hold		Swing		-9.74	
Source: Elections Canada

2015 Canadian federal election: Saint Boniface—Saint Vital
Party	Candidate	Votes	%	±%	Expenditures
Liberal	Dan Vandal	28,530	58.44	+27.23	$69,923.02
Conservative	François Catellier	14,005	28.69	-21.44	$152,734.08
New Democratic	Erin Selby	5,169	10.59	-5.20	$73,670.05
Green	Glenn Zaretski	1,119	2.29	-0.59	$485.69
Total valid votes/expense limit		48,823	99.69		$200,203.09
Total rejected ballots		152	0.31	–	
Turnout		48,975	73.97	–	
Eligible voters		66,205			
Liberal gain from Conservative		Swing		+24.34	
Source: Elections Canada

=== Municipal ===
2010 Winnipeg municipal election, City Councillor, St. Boniface Ward
Candidate	Vote	%
(x) Dan Vandal	15,242	82.2
Christopher Watt	3,291	17.8

2006 Winnipeg municipal election: City Councillor, St. Boniface Ward
Candidate	Votes	%
Dan Vandal	9,785	56.70
(x)Franco Magnifico	6,989	40.49
Murray Cliff	485	2.81
Total valid votes	17,259	100.00

Winnipeg municipal by-election, June 22, 2004: Mayor of Winnipeg
Candidate	Votes	%
Sam Katz	99,015	42.51
Dan Vandal	55,644	23.89
Allan Golden	34,562	14.84
MaryAnn Mihychuk	23,412	10.05
Garth Steek	16,497	7.08
Gordon Kirkby	1,986	0.85
Shirley Timm-Rudolph	801	0.34
Nelson P. Morrison	528	0.23
Natalie Pollock	453	0.19
Total valid votes	232,898	100.00

2002 Winnipeg municipal election: City Councillor, St. Boniface Ward
Candidate	Votes	%
(x)Dan Vandal	accl.	accl.

1998 Winnipeg municipal election: City Councillor, St. Boniface Ward
Candidate	Votes	%
(x)Dan Vandal	11,789	63.98
Gerry Duguay	4,825	26.19
George Provost	1,811	9.83
Total valid votes	18,425	100.00

1995 Winnipeg municipal election: City Councillor, St. Boniface Ward
Candidate	Votes	%
Dan Vandal	10,036	56.90
(x)Evelyne Reese	7,603	43.10
Total valid votes	17,639	100.00
