= Laurent Poliquin =

Canadian poet, visual artist and scholar

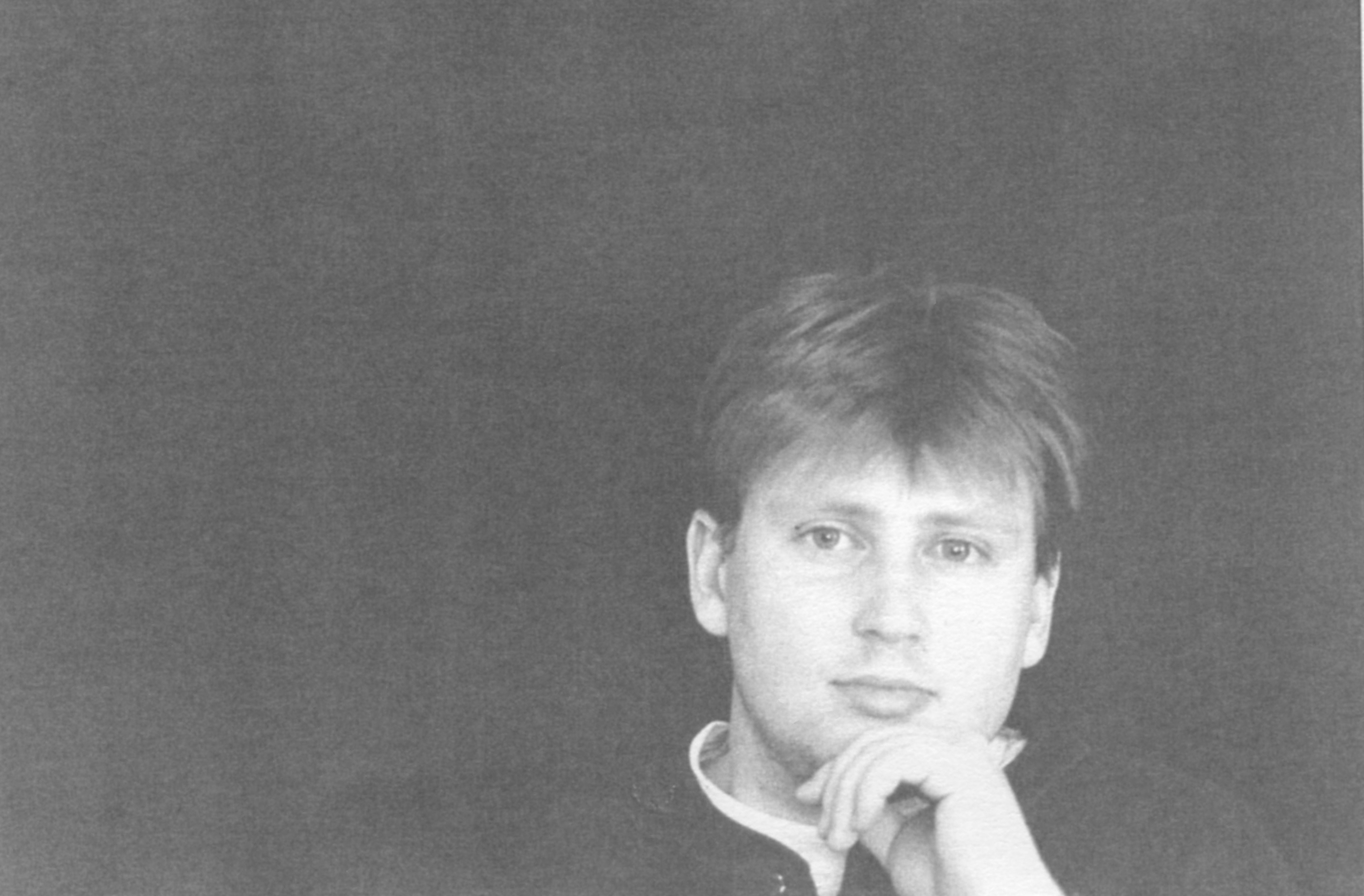
- Laurent Poliquin in 1996
- Born: June 12, 1975 (age 51); Trois-Rivières, Quebec, Canada
- Occupations: Poet, Professor of French-Canadian Literature
- Writing career
- Genres: poetry, essay
- Notable works: De l'amuïssement des certitudes; Marchand d'intensité; La Métisse filante
- Notable awards: Rue-Deschambault Literary Award; Marcel Richard Award; Alliance française Award; French Government Award
- Website: laurentpoliquin.my.canva.site

Laurent Poliquin (born June 12, 1975) is a Franco-Manitoban poet, visual artist, scholar, educator and a community activist. He is a member of the Green Party of Canada. He is the recipient of several literary awards, including the Prix de l’Alliance française (2002), the international Castello di Duino Prize (2006), the Rue-Deschambault Prize (2015), and the Senghor International Prize for Poetry. He is best known for his scholarly work on Francophone minority literatures and their connections with world literatures; through his essays and critical studies, he has helped to renew Francophone studies by focusing on lesser-heard voices, marginalized spaces, and writings of exiguity.

== Biography ==
He studied philosophy at the University of Quebec at Trois-Rivières and completed a MA in French studies at the University of British Columbia. In 1999, he moved to Winnipeg and completed a Bachelor of Education at Université de Saint-Boniface, for which he was awarded the prestigious Government of France Award. He works as a journalist and radio host before becoming a teacher. In 2008, he began a doctorate in French studies at the University of Manitoba (Canada) after holding editorial functions at Éditions des Plaines (2003–2009). In 2009 he was introduce as a member of the research center Young People's Text and Culture of the University of Winnipeg (CRYTC) and works as an editor for the international journal Youth: Young People, Texts, Cultures. He is also an honorary member of the International Scientific Council of the magazine Otago French Notes of New Zealand. He is the author of eighteen books.

Winner of the Alliance Française Award in Molsheim (Alsace) in 2002, Poliquin participated in the Toronto International Book Fair (2003), the Salon du livre de Paris (2007), the Trois-Rivières International Poetry Festival (2001, 2003, 2005, 2025) and the Winnipeg International Writers Festival (2001 to 2010). His poems have been published in Quebec (Le Sabord, Moebius and Ellipse), in Canada (Contemporary Verse 2, Canadian Literature) in France (Poésie sur Seine, Casse-Pieds, Le Temps des Cerises) and Italy (Ibiskos Editrice Risolo).

== Poetry and literary research ==
Poliquin’s first three poetry collections, Volute velours (2001), L’ondoiement du désir (2003), and Le vertigo du tremble (2005), were published by Éditions des Plaines in Saint-Boniface. In 2002, he received the Prix de l’Alliance française at the Rencontres internationales de Molsheim in France. His poem “La métisse filante” appeared in a 2005 issue of Canadian Literature devoted to French-language writing outside Quebec. The collection of the same name was published by L’Harmattan in 2008.

Poliquin continued to publish with L’Harmattan, which brought out Marchand d’intensité (2012), Voyageur des interstices (2018), L’ivresse fragile de l’aube (2021), and Tout est effluve (2024). Les Impliqués published L’acharnement des ruines in 2023. In 2026, L’Harmattan published Toute entière lumière, a collection on migration and encounters across languages, in a bilingual French–Arabic edition with a translation by Naziha Abakar Moussa.

Poliquin’s literary research has examined how French-Canadian minority communities expressed and developed their identities through print. His 2012 doctoral dissertation at the University of Manitoba studied newspapers and children’s literature from 1912 to 1944. A related article in Francophonies d’Amérique examined how the Saskatchewan newspaper Le Patriote de l’Ouest and its children’s column responded to the province’s 1931 school crisis. He developed his dissertation into De l’impuissance à l’autonomie, published by Éditions Prise de parole in 2017 and shortlisted for the 2018 Prix du Canada en sciences humaines et sociales.

In Les foudres du silence (2019), Poliquin brought together critical essays and interviews on French-language literature in Canada, with particular attention to the challenges writers in Western Canada face in reaching readers. In Children’s Literature in Education, he examined how four of Gabrielle Roy’s animal tales for children address belonging, linguistic assimilation, and rural displacement. In a 2026 article in the Nordic Journal of Francophone Studies, he compared Emmanuelle Pierrot’s Yukon-set novel La version qui n’intéresse personne with novels by Niviaq Korneliussen and Kim Leine set in Greenland, examining how the three works challenge idealized portrayals of the North.

== Artistic career ==
In the visual arts, Poliquin develops a practice at the intersection of language and image, where poetry converses with color and form. His work explores the porous boundary between literature and painting, creating an innovative dialogue that bridges the sensibilities of both worlds.

Poliquin's academic formation combines artistic rigor with interdisciplinary breadth. He holds a certificate in Postwar Abstract Painting from the Museum of Modern Art in New York, expertise in Contemporary Art Practice from Cornell University, and a foundation in Arts Management from HEC Montréal. With a PhD in Literary Studies from the University of Manitoba, he fuses scholarly reflection with a vivid commitment to creative expression.

His paintings have been shown in prominent galleries across the world. In October 2023, his works were exhibited at Artpal in San Francisco, followed by Gallea in Montreal. The Maison des artistes visuels francophones in Saint-Boniface hosted his presentation on November 30, 2023. In December 2023, he received the Artistic Excellence Award from the Circle Quarterly Art Review Magazine Contest for his painting La petite princesse jaune.

Poliquin's artistic reach also extends to major international venues, including Moonshadows at Galerie Monat in Madrid (November 20 – December 3, 2023) and The Body Language at the Venice International Art Fair (January–February 2024).

== Works ==
=== Poetry ===
- Toute entière lumière, with Arabic translation by Naziha Abakar Moussa, L'Harmattan, 2026
- Tout est effluve, L'Harmattan, 2024
- L'acharnement des ruines, Les Impliqués, 2023
- Le petit bruit du poème, Éditions du Blé, 2022
- L'ivresse fragile de l'aube, L'Harmattan, 2021
- Voyageur des interstices, L'Harmattan, 2018
- De l'amuïssement des certitudes, Jacques André Éditeur, 2014
- Le maniement des larmes, Plaines, 2013
- Marchand d'intensité, L'Harmattan, 2012
- Orpailleur de bisous, L'Interligne, 2010
- La Métisse filante, L'Harmattan, 2008
- Le vertigo du tremble, Plaines, 2005
- L'ondoiement du désir, Plaines, 2003
- Volute velours, Plaines, 2001

=== Essay ===
- La quête du séducteur ou le messianisme diabolique, Primo Mobile éditeur, 2012
- De l'impuissance à l'autonomie. Évolution culturelle et enjeux identitaires des minorités canadiennes-françaises, Prise de Parole, 2017.
- Les foudres du silence : l'estomac fragile de la littérature francophone au Canada, L'Harmattan, 2019.

=== Short stories ===
- Le courage des oiseaux lents, Éditions du blé, 2026
- Litterarum virus, Primo Mobile éditeur, 2016

=== Collective works ===
- L'Autre en mémoire, directed by Dominique Laporte, Presses de l'Université Laval, 2006.
- La Joie, an anthology prepared by Danielle Shelton, Paris / Montreal, cherries Time / Sayings 2006.
- Aria Acqua Terre Fuoco anthology established by Gabriella Valera Gruber, Florence, Ibiskos Editrice Risolo 2006.
- Plaisir du texte, texte de plaisir : l'oeuvre de J.R. Léveillé, directed by Lise Gaboury-Diallo, Presses Universitaires de Saint-Boniface, 2007.
- Saint-Boniface 1908–2008 : reflets d'une ville, directed by André Fauchon and Carol J. Harvey, Presses Universitaires de Saint-Boniface, 2008
- Sillons : hommage à Gabrielle Roy directed by Lise Gaboury-Diallo, Éditions du Blé 2009.
- Transplanter le Canada : Semailles / Transplanting Canada: Seedlings, directed by Marie Carrière and Jerry White, Edmonton, Canadian Literature Centre, 2009
- Littératures francophones minoritaires (Canada, 1999–2010) : Entretiens et textes , directed by Catherine Parayre, Vienna, Praesens Verlag, 2011.
- Nous, la multitude, anthology established by Françoise Coulmin, Paris: Le Temps des cerises, 2011.
- Against innocence: Aesthetics of children's literature in commitment, directed by Britta Benert and P. Clermont, Frankfurt am Main: Peter Lang Verlag, 2011
- Paroles francophones de l'Ouest et du Nord canadiens, directed by Carol Harvey, Presses Universitaires de Saint-Boniface, 2012.
- Étoiles et planètes, anthology established by André Desforges, Bordeaux, Les dossiers d'Aquitaine, 2012.
- La francophonie de la Colombie-Britannique : mémoire et fiction, directed by Guy Poirier, Ottawa: Éditions David, 2012.
- Les institutions littéraires en question dans la franco-amérique , edited by B. Doyon-Gosselin, D. Bélanger and C. Bérard, Laval University Press, 2014.
- Cancer, le poète ne meurt jamais, anthology established by Regroupement des poètes francophones engagés pour la paix et la liberté, Rotterdam, Les Engagés Editions, 2017.
- Bref! 150 nouvelles pancanadiennes, directed by Charles Leblanc, Editions du Blé, 20

== Interview ==
- Une entrevue avec Laurent Poliquin, interview with Nina Berkhout CV2, vol. 30, no 1, summer 2007, p. 58-62.
- Une poétique assumée: rencontre avec Laurent Poliquin, interview with Perrine Foucault, L'Harmattan, May 2018.
- Entretien avec Laurent Poliquin par Bianca Deshaies, Milwaukee Review, vol. 92, July 2021, p. 42-49.

== Awards and distinctions ==
- 2023: Artistic Excellence Award from the Circle Quarterly Art Review Magazine Contest for his piece entitled "La petite princesse jaune"
- 2018: Léopold Sédar Senghor International Poetry Prize
- 2018: Canada Prize for ''De l'impuissance à l'autonomie'', finalist
- 2016: Humanities Federation Scholarly Publishing Award for ''De l'impuissance à l'autonomie''
- 2015: Rue-Deschambault Literary Award for De l'amuïssement des certitudes
- 2015: Aqua Books Lansdowne Prize for Poetry De l'amuïssement des certitudes, shortlisted
- 2013: Aqua Books Lansdowne Prize for Poetry Marchand d'intensité, shortlisted
- 2009–2012: Doctoral Scholarship Joseph-Armand Bombardier SSHRC
- 2011: Margaret R. Pope Scholarship, University of Manitoba
- 2011: Writing Fellowship from the Winnipeg Arts Council
- 2010: Dr. Anita K. Ross Scholarship, University of Manitoba
- 2009: Aqua Books Lansdowne Prize for Poetry La Métisse filante, shortlisted
- 2008: Marcel Richard Award, University of Manitoba
- 2006: Duino Castle International Poetry Prize (Italy) to La Metisse filante, shortlisted
- 2001: Alliance française Award (Molsheim, France)
- 2001: Government of France Award

== Electoral record ==
2021 Canadian federal election: Saint Boniface—Saint Vital
| Party | Candidate | Votes | % | ±% | Expenditures |
|---|---|---|---|---|---|
| Liberal | Dan Vandal | 19,908 | 43.8 | +1.0 | $57,062.60 |
| Conservative | Shola Agboola | 12,749 | 28.0 | -4.6 | $84,279.53 |
| New Democratic | Meghan Waters | 9,767 | 21.5 | +4.6 | $13,895.44 |
| People's | Jane MacDiarmid | 1,978 | 4.4 | +3.2 | $0.00 |
| Green | Laurent Poliquin | 676 | 1.5 | -4.1 | $1,459.10 |
| Rhinoceros | Sébastien CoRhino | 80 | 0.2 | N/A | $0.00 |
| Independent | Scott A. A. Anderson | 58 | 0.1 | N/A | $0.00 |
| Independent | Naomi Crisostomo | 31 | 0.1 | N/A | $0.00 |
| Independent | Kerri Hildebrandt | 31 | 0.1 | N/A | $0.00 |
| Independent | Charles Currie | 25 | 0.1 | N/A | $0.00 |
| Independent | Jean-Denis Boudreault | 24 | 0.1 | N/A | $0.00 |
| Independent | Patrick Strzalkowski | 21 | <0.1 | N/A | $0.00 |
| Veterans Coalition | Matthew Correia | 17 | <0.1 | N/A | $0.00 |
| Independent | Denis Berthiaume | 16 | <0.1 | N/A | $0.00 |
| Independent | Tomas Szuchewycz | 15 | <0.1 | N/A | $0.00 |
| Independent | Alexandra Engering | 14 | <0.1 | N/A | $0.00 |
| Independent | Scott Falkingham | 14 | <0.1 | N/A | $0.00 |
| Independent | Ryan Huard | 14 | <0.1 | N/A | $0.00 |
| Independent | Eliana Rosenblum | 13 | <0.1 | N/A | $0.00 |
| Independent | Manon Lili Desbiens | 11 | <0.1 | N/A | $0.00 |
| Independent | Conrad Lukawski | 7 | <0.1 | N/A | $0.00 |
| Total valid votes/expense limit | | 45,469 | 99.2 | – | $106,281.08 |
| Total rejected ballots | | 379 | 0.8 | | |
| Turnout | | 45,848 | 66.3 | | |
| Eligible voters | | 69,204 | | | |
| Liberal hold | | Swing | | +2.8 | |
Source: Elections Canada
