= Roger Teillet =

Canadian politician

The Honourable Roger Teillet PC

Minister of Veterans Affairs
- In office 22 April 1963 – 5 July 1968
- Prime Minister: Lester B. Pearson; Pierre Trudeau
- Preceded by: Marcel Lambert
- Succeeded by: Jean-Eudes Dubé

Member of Parliament for St. Boniface
- In office 18 June 1962 – 24 June 1968
- Preceded by: Laurier Régnier
- Succeeded by: Joseph-Philippe Guay

Member of the Legislative Assembly of Manitoba for St. Boniface
- In office 8 June 1953 – 13 May 1959
- Preceded by: Edwin Hansford
- Succeeded by: Laurent Desjardins

Personal details
- Born: Jean-Baptiste Roger Joseph Camille Teillet; 21 August 1912 St. Vital, Manitoba, Canada
- Died: 1 May 2002 (aged 89) Ottawa, Ontario, Canada
- Party: Liberal
- Other political affiliations: Liberal-Progressive
- Spouse: Jeanne Boux (m. 1940; died 2000)
- Relations: Louis Riel (great uncle)
- Children: 2
- Education: Université de Saint-Boniface
- Profession: Business Manager; Insurance Agent; Businessman

Jean-Baptiste Roger Joseph Camille Teillet PC (21 August 1912 – 1 May 2002) was a Canadian politician, becoming the first self-identifying Métis member of the Canadian Cabinet in 1963.

He served in the Legislative Assembly of Manitoba as a Liberal-Progressive from 1953 to 1959, and in the House of Commons of Canada as a Liberal from 1962 to 1968. Teillet was a cabinet minister in the government of Lester B. Pearson, and retained that post after Pearson stepped down and Pierre Elliott Trudeau became the new Liberal leader.

== Personal life ==
=== Early life ===
Jean-Baptiste Roger Joseph Camille Teillet was born on River Road in St. Vital, Manitoba, to Sara Riel and Camille Teillet. Born into one of Manitoba's most well-known Métis families, Roger Teillet was a direct descendant of Marie-Anne Gaboury and Jean-Baptiste Lagimodière, who were the first white settlers in Canada's west and were also the grandparents of Louis Riel. Roger was the grandson of Joseph Riel, Louis Riel's younger brother.

Roger was educated in St. Vital and St. Boniface schools, and at St. Boniface College.

=== World War II ===
During the Second World War, Roger was a flight lieutenant in the Royal Canadian Air Force and a navigator on a Halifax bomber. He took part in 24 successful bombing missions over Germany before being shot down over France in 1943. After evading German soldiers for 15 days, he was captured at the Rivière Cher, and spent almost three years as a prisoner of war in Stalag Luft III, located at Sagan (now Żagań, Poland), southeast of Berlin in the then-province of Silesia. Conditions in this camp were not as brutal as in many others because it was specifically made for officers, who were not subject to forced labour. As a prisoner-of-war, he continued his studies through an educational program that was set up using the expertise of prisoners there. (Stalag Luft III was made famous after the war because of Paul Brickhill's book, The Great Escape, a book which was also made into a film.)

In January 1945, prisoners from camps all over Germany were herded from the camps and forced to walk the length and breadth of Germany, in an effort to evade the encroaching Allied armies. On 5 May 1945, Teillet and the others were turned over to the British Army not far from Bremen. Their guards surrendered and the prisoners were airlifted to Brussels.

Upon his return to Canada, Teillet went into the insurance business in Winnipeg. He was a member of the Knights of Columbus and active in his Catholic parish of Précieux-sang. When his two sons, Philippe and Richard, were in school, he became a trustee in the separate school system.

=== Later life ===
Teillet had always been involved in politics: he was involved with the L'Union Nationale Métisse; was a party organizer before ever going overseas; and was an original members of the St. Vital Young Liberals when still a teenager. Now, in the post-war years, he became very active in the Manitoba Liberal Association, acting as the vice-president. He also served in many capacities on the federal liberal party's executive in Winnipeg South Centre.

Teillet was married to Jeanne Boux of St. Boniface, Manitoba, with whom he had two sons, who in turn had two grandchildren. Their eldest son, Philippe Teillet, is a professor emeritus at the University of Lethbridge.

He died in Ottawa in 2002. Jeanne predeceased him by two years, and their younger son, Richard, died of cancer in 2003. All three are buried in Green Acres Cemetery in St. Boniface.

== Political career ==
Teillet was first elected to the Manitoba Legislature in the 1953 provincial election, finishing atop the polls in the constituency of St. Boniface, which in those days elected two members via a single transferable ballot. For the next five years, Roger sat as a backbencher in Premier Douglas Lloyd Campbell's government.

Manitoba abandoned its multi-member constituencies in 1956, and Teillet was re-elected for the now single-member seat of St. Boniface in the 1958 provincial election. The Liberal-Progressives were defeated in this election, and Roger did not seek re-election in 1959.

Teillet ran for a seat in the House of Commons in the federal election of 1962, defeating incumbent Progressive Conservative Laurier Regnier by 2,601 votes in the federal riding of St. Boniface. He defeated Regnier again in the 1963 election, when the Liberals won a minority government under Lester B. Pearson.

On 22 April 1963, Teillet was appointed Minister of Veterans Affairs by Prime Minister Pearson. At this point, Teillet became the first self-identifying Métis member of Cabinet.

As Minister of Veterans Affairs, Teillet was involved in some controversial projects. The Royal Canadian Legion was vehemently opposed to any new flag for Canada and Teillet was required to be a mediary. He sat on the New Flag Committee as an ex officio member. He was also involved in the revamping of Canada's veterans' hospitals. In both 1964 and 1966, he represented Canada at war commemorative ceremonies at war cemeteries in Europe. At this time, he toured Canada's war graves. He was dismayed at the condition of the monument at Vimy Ridge. He brought his concern forward but work did not begin on the monument until 1984. Still, it was through Roger's effort that the monument was eventually restored.

Teillet saw to it that Vimy Ridge was properly recognized at Vimy Park in Winnipeg, and established a memorial in Halifax dedicated to Royal Canadian Naval Volunteer Reserve members who died in the World War II. As a Métis, Teillet brought forward the concerns of the Métis in parliament, particularly as they involved the cause that Louis Riel had died for.

Teillet was re-elected over Progressive Conservative candidate Harry DeLeeuw in 1965. He was the only Liberal MP in the Prairies. In 1968, he unexpectedly lost the Liberal nomination for St. Boniface to Joseph-Philippe Guay. Choosing not to run in another riding, Teillet formally resigned from Cabinet on July 5, 1968.

Teillet was then appointed to head the Canada Pension Commission by Prime Minister Pierre Trudeau. While still in Cabinet, Teillet had been working with this Commission with a view to reforming veterans' pensions. He served on this Commission until his retirement in 1980.

== Electoral history ==
1965 Canadian federal election: St. Boniface
| Party | Candidate | Votes | % | ±% |
|---|---|---|---|---|
| Liberal | Roger Teillet | 13,961 | 41.82 | +1.15 |
| Progressive Conservative | Harry Deleeuw | 10,499 | 31.45 | +2.28 |
| New Democratic | Harry Shafransky | 8,923 | 26.73 | +8.16 |
| Total valid votes | | 33,383 | 100.0 | |
| Liberal hold | | Swing | | -0.57 |

1963 Canadian federal election: St. Boniface
| Party | Candidate | Votes | % | ±% |
|---|---|---|---|---|
| Liberal | Roger Teillet | 13,547 | 40.67 | +2.73 |
| Progressive Conservative | Laurier Régnier | 9,716 | 29.17 | -0.60 |
| New Democratic | Graham Campbell | 6,184 | 18.57 | -5.01 |
| Social Credit | Georges-J. Forest | 3,859 | 11.59 | +2.88 |
| Total valid votes | | 33,306 | 100.0 | |
| Liberal hold | | Swing | | +1.67 |

1962 Canadian federal election: St. Boniface
| Party | Candidate | Votes | % | ±% |
|---|---|---|---|---|
| Liberal | Roger Teillet | 12,084 | 37.94 | +4.99 |
| Progressive Conservative | Laurier Régnier | 9,483 | 29.78 | -14.24 |
| New Democratic | Graham Campbell | 7,508 | 23.57 | +3.60 |
| Social Credit | Joseph-E St Hilaire | 2,773 | 8.71 | +5.65 |
| Total valid votes | | 31,848 | 100.0 | |
| Liberal gain from Progressive Conservative | | Swing | | +9.61 |
