= Monster Force =

Canadian-American animated television series

- The first DVD volume cover of Monster Force, released in 2009
- Developed by: Marv Wolfman
- Directed by: Chris Schouten
- Voices of: Philip Akin; Lawrence Bayne; Robert Bockstael; Rob Cowan; Paul Haddad; Dean Hagopian; David Hewlett; Howard Jerome; Ray Landry; Carolly Larson
- Composer: Edmund Eagan
- Countries of origin: United States; Canada
- No. of episodes: 13

Production
- Executive producers: Sheldon S. Wiseman; Kathi Castillo
- Producer: Gerald Tripp
- Running time: 22 minutes
- Production companies: Lacewood Productions; Universal Cartoon Studios

Original release
- Network: Syndication
- Release: April 9 – July 16, 1994

Monster Force is a 13-episode animated series created in April 9, 1994 by Universal Cartoon Studios and Canadian studio Lacewood Productions. The story is set approximately in 2020 and centers on a group of teenagers who, with help of high tech weaponry, fight off against classic Universal Monsters and spiritual beings threatening humanity. Some of the crew have personal vendettas (e.g., one has the "curse of the Wolfman" that has been handed down through generations and another had a family member taken away from her by Dracula), while others fight for mankind out of a sense of altruism. The series aired in syndication alongside another Universal animated series, Exosquad. Universal Studios Home Entertainment released the first seven episodes to DVD on September 15, 2009.

== Story ==
In the distant future of 2020, six college students and their professor have formed the Monster Force, a squad dedicated to keeping the world safe from the likes of Count Dracula, The Mummy and an evil legion of supernatural criminals known as the creatures of the night.

== Characters ==
The "good guys" bear the name of "Monster Force" and are led by Dr. Reed Crawley. Creatures of the Night (de facto led by Dracul, the greatest vampire in history) represent the "bad guys".

=== Monster Force ===
- Dr. Reed "Doc" Crawley (voiced by Lawrence Bayne) is a young yet brilliant scientist who is also the main tactician and strategist of the team. He has once been Dracul's captive and since then vowed to end his reign of terror. Apparently, he is the inventor of the entire cutting-edge weaponry and equipment used by Monster Force. One of his most brilliant inventions is the EMACS (Energized Monster Armed Containment Suit) or simply power suit, which allows normal humans to fight superhuman dark powers at the same level.
- Luke Talbot / the Wolfman (voiced by Paul Haddad) is the only werewolf in the team, and does not utilize high-tech devices invented by Doc. He is actually a good-natured young man affected by lycanthropy, which has been the curse of his family for generations. During the full moon when he cannot control the curse, his teammates have to restrain him. Otherwise, his Wolfman form makes him nearly invincible in a monster-to-monster fight. He is descended from Larry Talbot, the original Wolfman.
- Tripp Hansen / the Martial Artist (voiced by Philip Akin) is a man of action and a self-confident optimist who enjoys fighting itself. A martial arts specialist, when aided by his power suit he becomes even more powerful and deadly. He also possesses a special technique called Storm Strike. His motto is "One monster at a time!"
- Lance McGruder / Powerhouse Marksman (voiced by David Hewlett) is the long-range weapon specialist of the team since his power suit contains the greatest amount of firepower and is capable of shooting beams of cold, heat, electricity, as well as other elements. In the normal life, he is a modest, rather shy but always good-spirited and curious young man.
- Shelley Frank / the Psychic (voiced by Caroly Larson) is the infiltration and intelligence specialist of the team. She is the only female member of Monster Force, as well as the only one whose power suit enables her to fly above the ground, but she had to sacrifice most of her power suit's firepower for this ability. She is also capable of limited telepathy. Apparently, one of her family members has been killed by Dracul. Her name is a play off Mary Shelley, author of the novel Frankenstein.
- Frankenstein / the Monster (voiced by Howard Jerome) is the same monster that was created by Victor Frankenstein in the novel under the same name. In this series, he is a heroic member of Monster Force. He possesses incredible superstrength and endurance as well as extremely resilient skin. Moreover, once killed, he can be resurrected if approximately 20 kV is applied to his body. Frankenstein also has some familial ties to Shelley Frank.

=== Creatures of the Night ===
- Dracul (voiced by Robert Bockstael), also known as the Prince of Darkness, is the archenemy of Monster Force team and Dr. Crawley who serves as the primary antagonist of the series. He is a vampire and a Master of Evil but holds the façade of being polite, charming and noble. His abilities include metamorphosis, hypnotic powers, illusion and summoning spells, as well as great tactical and strategic capabilities that match Reed Crawley's talents. In the first episode he is referred to as "Dracula" until he personally identifies himself as "Dracul".
  - Renfield (voiced by Dean Hagopian) is Dracul's loyal servant.
- Creature from the Black Lagoon, also referred to simply as the Creature, is a mysterious amphibian being that has destroyed entire villages throughout the decades. It can survive both above and below the water, possesses immense physical strength and a special ability of supersonic shrill vocalizations that shatters objects. The Creature from the Black Lagoon appears and disappears ominously.
- HoTep / the Mummy (voiced by Robert Bockstael) is based upon the classic Universal Monster played by Boris Karloff. HoTep was a priest in ancient Egypt who loved Princess Ananka and when she died, tried to resurrect her. For his transgressions, he has been cursed and entombed for thousands of years, but modern archaeologists accidentally revived him. As an undead sorcerer, he possesses various powers including superstrength, limited invulnerability, the ability to command sandstorms, and shapeshifting into a dust devil. Moreover, he is able to cast a super cold breath that instantly freezes objects and people. HoTep is voiced by Robert Bockstael.
- Niles Lupon / Bela the Werewolf (voiced by Rob Cowan) is a seemingly harmless older man who inflicted the curse of lycanthropy upon the Talbot family starting with Lawrence Talbot, who was Luke Talbot's grandfather. His harmless façade fooled just about all of the Monster Force members until the wolf-headed cane he always carried with him was recognized from Lawrence's journal. Though old, his werewolf form is extremely powerful with super strength, speed, and invulnerability to all but silver and energy weapons. Though his name technically references actor Béla Lugosi, who played the werewolf responsible for infecting Lawrence Talbot with lycanthropy in the 1941 Wolf Man film, he was credited as a character also named Bela.
- The Bride is the female monster created by Dr. V. Frankenstein to be a companion for his original creature. Not truly evil, she simply wants to be left alone by everyone including her intended husband who still loves her deeply. She has the same powers as the Monster.

== Episodes ==
No.	Title	Written by	Original release date
1	"Sign of the Dragon"	Paul Edick	April 9, 1994
Dracul and Renfield abduct Luke and try to destroy his humanity and make him embrace being a monster by forcing him to kill the rest of the Monster Force.
2	"Stalking the Beast"	Ken Ross	April 30, 1994
Bela, the wolfman who cursed Luke's family with lycanthropy, attempts to get a hold of a cane that can allegedly control all werewolves.
3	"Immortality of Evil"	Darson Hall	May 7, 1994
Dracul assembles other ancient vampires to help him perform a ritual that will supposedly remove all of their weaknesses and mutate them into Gods.
4	"Return of the Creature from the Black Lagoon"	Mary Crawford; Alan Templeton	May 14, 1994
A greedy researcher's plundering of a sunken city draws the ire of the Creature from the Black Lagoon.
5	"Dark Deception"	Patrick Granleese	May 21, 1994
The Monster Force storms Dracul's castle with the assistance of a cantankerous and old-fashioned vampire hunter named Abraham Stoker.
6	"He Walks Again"	Ken Ross	May 28, 1994
HoTep, an evil Egyptian sorcerer who was mummified alive, is awakened by archaeologists and pitted against the Monster Force by Dracul.
7	"Dark City"	Mary Crawford; Alan Templeton	June 4, 1994
The Monster Force becomes trapped inside a malevolent, living city that feeds on the life force of those it lures into it.
8	"Prisoner of Kaliaga"	Darson Hall	June 11, 1994
While the rest of the team deals with a poltergeist, Tripp and Lance are taken prisoner by a secluded secret society.
9	"The Rage of Frankenstein's Bride"	Mary Crawford; Alan Templeton	June 18, 1994
The long-lost mate of Frankenstein's Monster resurfaces in Europe on the run from a mad scientist who wants to replicate the process that created her and the Monster.
10	"The Return of the Mummy"	Mary Crawford; Alan Templeton	June 25, 1994
11	"In Pursuit of the Wolf"	Mary Crawford; Alan Templeton	July 2, 1994
12	"Caged Fury"	Darson Hall	July 9, 1994
13	"Operation Morning Light"	Darson Hall	July 16, 1994

== See also ==
- Universal Monsters
- Drak Pack
- The Monster Squad (1987 film)
- Monster Squad (1970s TV series)
- Vampire film
- List of vampire television series
- The Mummy: The Animated Series
- Mummies Alive!
