= Ginette Lavack =

Canadian politician

Ginette Lavack MP

Member of Parliament for St. Boniface—St. Vital
- Incumbent
- Assumed office April 28, 2025
- Preceded by: Dan Vandal

Personal details
- Born: Winnipeg, Manitoba, Canada
- Party: Liberal
- Education: Université de Saint-Boniface (BA)
- Website: ginettelavack.liberal.ca

Ginette Lavack MP is a Canadian politician from the Liberal Party of Canada. She was elected member of Parliament (MP) for St. Boniface—St. Vital in the 2025 Canadian federal election. Lavack currently serves as the Parliamentary Secretary to the Minister of Indigenous Services Canada since June 4, 2025.

== Career ==
Before her political career, Lavack was the chief executive officer (CEO) of the Centre Culturel Franco-Manitobain from 2017 to 2025, before relinquishing her position to run as Member of Parliament.

Lavack was nominated as Liberal Party of Canada candidate for St. Boniface—St. Vital on February 16, 2025.

== Electoral history ==
2025 Canadian federal election: St. Boniface—St. Vital
Party	Candidate	Votes	%	±%	Expenditures
Liberal	Ginette Lavack	32,599	59.79	+15.89	
Conservative	Shola Agboola	17,625	32.33	+4.04	
New Democratic	Thomas Linner	3,775	6.92	–14.25	
People's	Gilles Pelletier	523	0.96	–3.36	
Total valid votes/expense limit					
Total rejected ballots					
Turnout		54,522	72.05		
Eligible voters		75,672			
Liberal notional hold		Swing		+5.93	
Source: Elections Canada
