= Shelly Glover =

Canadian politician (born 1967)

The Honourable Shelly Glover PC
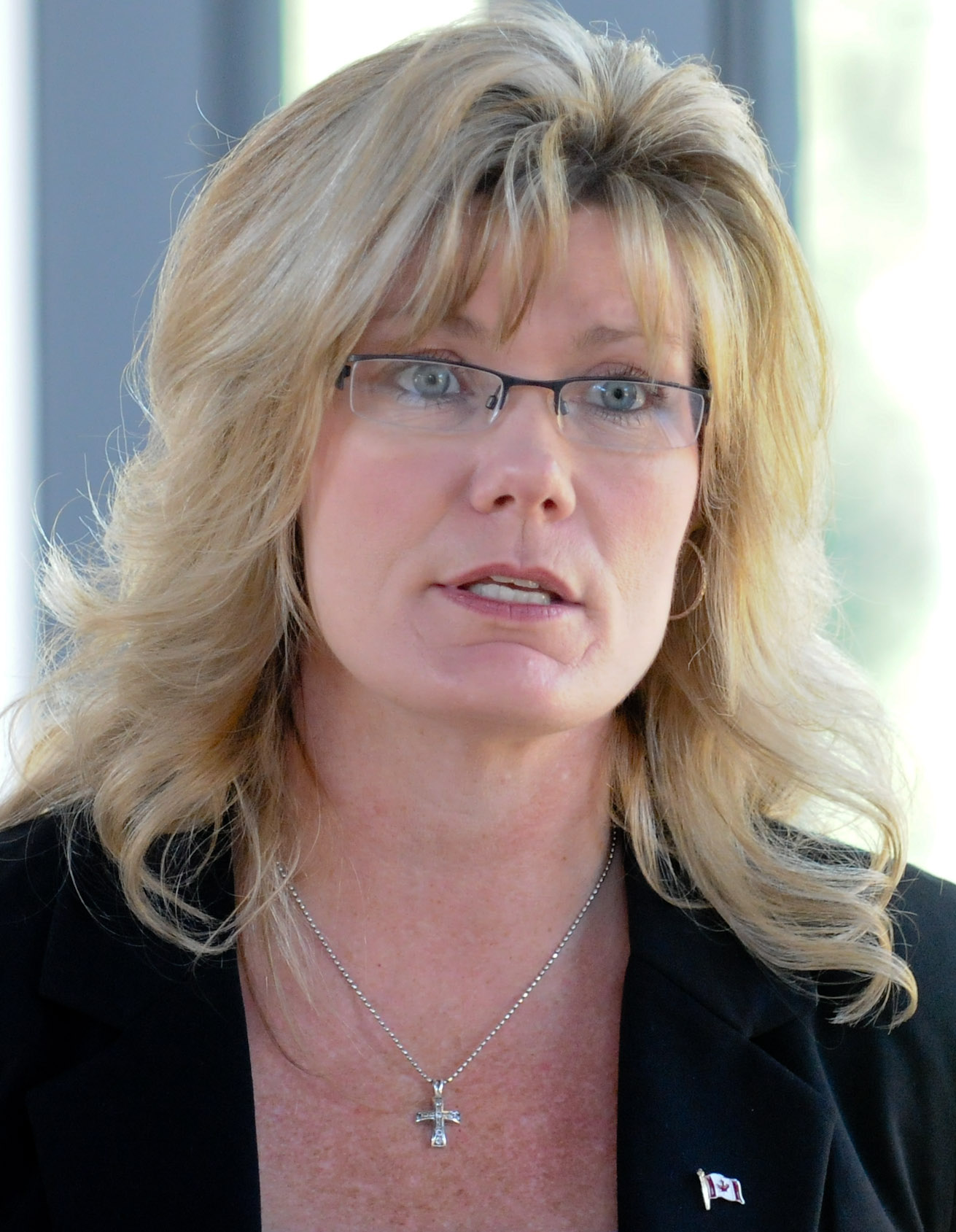
- Glover in 2014

Minister of Canadian Heritage and Official Languages
- In office July 15, 2013 – November 4, 2015
- Prime Minister: Stephen Harper
- Preceded by: James Moore
- Succeeded by: Mélanie Joly

Member of Parliament for Saint Boniface
- In office October 14, 2008 – August 4, 2015
- Preceded by: Raymond Simard
- Succeeded by: Dan Vandal

Personal details
- Born: January 2, 1967 (age 59) Saskatoon, Saskatchewan, Canada
- Party: Conservative (federal); Conservative (provincial)
- Children: 5
- Police Career
- Department: Winnipeg Police Service
- Service years: 1989–2008, 2015-2018
- Rank: Sergeant
- Awards: Police Exemplary Service Medal

Shelly A. Glover PC (born January 2, 1967) is a Canadian politician and former sergeant with the Winnipeg Police Service. Following the 2008 federal election, she became the first policewoman to become a member of Parliament (MP) in Canadian history, representing the riding of Saint Boniface, until her resignation in 2015.

A member of the Conservative Party, she served in the cabinet of former Prime Minister Stephen Harper, appointed as Parliamentary Secretary to the Minister of Finance in January 2011, then as the Minister of Canadian Heritage and Official Languages in 2013. Glover served as a member of the Winnipeg Police Service for almost 19 years prior to her election, rising to the rank of sergeant. She was on leave of absence from the police force while serving in Ottawa.

== Personal life ==
Glover is fluent in English and French, and self-identifies as a Manitoba Métis. She is married to Bruce, a retired police officer and small business owner; they have five children.

== Federal politics ==
Running under the Conservative Party, Glover ran for and won the electoral district of Saint Boniface, Manitoba, in the 2008 federal election from incumbent Liberal Raymond Simard by over 4,500 votes. She thereby became the first policewoman to become a Member of Parliament in Canadian history.

On November 7, 2008, Glover was named Parliamentary Secretary for Official Languages by Prime Minister Stephen Harper. She was re-elected in a rematch with Simard in the 2011 election, the first time in the riding's history that a centre-right MP had been reelected. Glover did not stand for re-election in 2015.

=== Election spending controversy ===
The Speaker of the House of Commons received a request from Elections Canada to suspend Glover as an MP in June 2013. Glover failed to file documents related to the 2011 election campaign. Elections Canada spokesman John Enright said, "Those letters advised the speaker that an elected candidate shall not continue to sit or vote as members of the House of Commons pending the filing of complete and accurate returns." Glover filed a legal challenge in the Manitoba Court of Queen's Bench. Liberal MP Scott Andrews indicated the suspension of Glover from Parliament should be immediate according to previous legal precedent. On July 22, 2014, it was reported in the media that Glover's staffers had attempted to remove the controversial election spending information from her Wikipedia page.

In July 2013, it was reported that Glover had filed a revised return, which Elections Canada accepted. Her campaign acknowledged that, as a result of "inadvertence and an honest misunderstanding of what constitutes an election expense," it exceeded the legal limit by $2,267. Glover promised to make up for the overspend by a corresponding underspend in the next election, and was not penalised.

=== Minister of Canadian Heritage and Official Languages ===
Shelly Glover was appointed Minister of Canadian Heritage and Official Languages on July 15, 2013.

On October 8, 2013, on behalf of Glover, Daryl Kramp, Member of Parliament (Prince Edward-Hastings), announced support for the Tsi Kionhnheht Ne Onkwawenna Language Circle (TKNOLC) to develop Mohawk language-learning tools.

== After federal politics ==
Glover resigned from the Winnipeg Police Service in April 2018, writing in her letter that the service became a "toxic workplace" for her and that "the WPS is no longer a healthy environment."

== Provincial politics ==
On August 25, 2021, Glover announced her candidacy in the 2021 Progressive Conservative Party of Manitoba leadership election. On September 16, she was confirmed as one of two candidates appearing on the ballot, alongside Heather Stefanson. She lost the party leadership election by 363 votes.

On March 12, 2025, Glover announced that she would be planning to create her own new center-right party to rival the PC's and take a more moderate stance. Despite that also being the mission statement of the Keystone Party of Manitoba their leader Kevin Friesen stated Glover was not in contact with them.

== Electoral record ==
2011 Canadian federal election: Saint Boniface—Saint Vital
Party	Candidate	Votes	%	±%	Expenditures
Conservative	Shelly Glover	21,737	50.3	+4.0	$84,354.60
Liberal	Raymond Simard	13,314	30.8	-4.3	$82,059.23
New Democratic	Patrice Miniely	6,935	16.0	+2.9	$1,082.97
Green	Marc Payette	1,245	2.9	-2.1	$950.00
Total valid votes/expense limit		43,231	100.0		–
Total rejected ballots		181	0.4	+0.1	
Turnout		43,412	67.18	+2.86	
Eligible voters		64,620	–	–	

2008 Canadian federal election: Saint Boniface—Saint Vital
Party	Candidate	Votes	%	±%	Expenditures
Conservative	Shelly Glover	19,440	46.3	+11.3	$71,480
Liberal	Raymond Simard	14,728	35.1	-3.5	$78,353
New Democratic	Matt Schaubroeck	5,502	13.1	-8.8	$12,641
Green	Marc Payette	2,104	5.0	+1.2	$8,506
Christian Heritage	Justin Gregoire	195	0.5	-0.2	$12
Total valid votes/expense limit		41,969	100.0		$79,503
Total rejected ballots		133	0.3	-0.1	
Turnout		42,102	64.32	-1.6	

== Honours ==
Ribbon	Description	Notes
	Queen Elizabeth II Diamond Jubilee Medal	2012; Canadian Version of this Medal
	Police Exemplary Service Medal	20 years service with the Winnipeg Police Service

- On July 15, 2013 Glover was appointed as a member of the Queen's Privy Council for Canada, giving her the honorific title "The Honourable" and post-nominal letters "PC" for life.
