= Harry Shafransky =

Canadian politician

Harry Shafransky (September 4, 1930 – September 10, 1986) was a politician in Manitoba, Canada. He served as a New Democratic member of the Legislative Assembly of Manitoba from 1969 to 1977.

Born in Poland, he came to Canada while still young and grew up on a farm near Roblin, Manitoba. Shafransky was educated at the University of Manitoba. He worked as a teacher in northern British Columbia and then Winnipeg before entering politics. He ran for the House of Commons of Canada in the federal election of 1965, finishing a relatively strong third in the Winnipeg riding of St. Boniface. His first venture into provincial politics was not as successful; he challenged Liberal leader Gildas Molgat in Ste. Rose in the 1966 election, and finished a distant fourth with only 86 votes.

He ran for federal office again in the 1968 election, and placed a more respectable second while still finishing well behind Liberal Joseph-Philippe Guay, the winner.

Shafransky was finally elected to office in the 1969 provincial election, scoring a fairly easy victory in the northeast Winnipeg riding of Radisson. He was re-elected over Progressive Conservative challenge Abe Kovnats in the 1973 election.

Shafransky did not serve in the cabinet of Edward Schreyer. He was defeated by Kovnats in the 1977 election, and did not seek a political comeback thereafter.

After leaving politics, he worked in the Manitoba departments of Highways and Transportation, Environment and Natural Resources. Shafransky died in Winnipeg at the age of 56 of a heart attack.

== Electoral history ==
1968 Canadian federal election: Saint Boniface—Saint Vital
| Party | Candidate | Votes | % | ±% |
|---|---|---|---|---|
| Liberal | Joseph-Philippe Guay | 22,032 | 51.7 | +9.9 |
| New Democratic | Harry Shafransky | 11,566 | 27.2 | +0.4 |
| Progressive Conservative | Vaughan L. Baird | 8,048 | 18.9 | -12.6 |
| Social Credit | Georges Forest | 949 | 2.2 | |
| Total valid votes | | 42,595 | 100.0 | |

1965 Canadian federal election: St. Boniface
| Party | Candidate | Votes | % | ±% |
|---|---|---|---|---|
| Liberal | Roger Teillet | 13,961 | 41.82 | +1.15 |
| Progressive Conservative | Harry Deleeuw | 10,499 | 31.45 | +2.28 |
| New Democratic | Harry Shafransky | 8,923 | 26.73 | +8.16 |
| Total valid votes | | 33,383 | 100.0 | |
| Liberal hold | | Swing | | -0.57 |
