= Louis Deniset =

Canadian politician

Member of Parliament for St. Boniface
- In office October 14, 1957 – February 1, 1958
- Preceded by: Fernand Viau
- Succeeded by: Laurier Régnier

Personal details
- Born: June 29, 1919 St. Boniface, Manitoba, Canada
- Died: August 26, 1983 (aged 64)
- Party: Liberal

Louis Deniset (June 29, 1919 – August 26, 1983) was a Liberal Party of Canada member for Saint Boniface, Manitoba, from October 14, 1957, to February 1, 1958.

== Early life ==
Deniset was born in St. Boniface, Manitoba, on June 29, 1919, to François Deniset and Rachel Bernier. He attended Collège universitaire de Saint-Boniface and later the University of Manitoba, where he gained a Bachelor of Arts and a Bachelor of Laws. During World War II Deniset served as an officer of the Royal 22^{e} Régiment and from 1954 to 1957 he served as a lieutenant-colonel of the Winnipeg Grenadiers. Having married Jeanne Remillard in April 1951, Deniset returned to St. Boniface and established a law practice there. Before his entry on the political scene, he served as L'Association d'education des canadiens français du Manitoba.

== Political career ==
In 1957 Prime Minister of Canada Louis St. Laurent called an early election for June 10, confident of victory after twenty-two years of Liberal Party government. Deniset was successful in his attempt to run for the district of Saint Boniface and began his term as a member of the House of Commons of Canada in opposition to a minority Conservative Party government. St. Laurent resigned the leadership of the Liberal party and a new leader, Lester Pearson, was appointed. Pearson made the decision to call for the new Prime Minister John Diefenbaker's resignation, and Diefenbaker called an early election. Deniset lost his seat in the March 31, 1958, general election, having served a term of 9 months, 21 days.

Deniset died on August 26, 1983, at age 64.

== Election results ==
1958 Canadian federal election: St. Boniface
Party	Candidate	Votes	%	±%
Progressive Conservative	Laurier Régnier	12,688	44.01	+19.83
Liberal	Louis Deniset	9,500	32.95	+1.82
Co-operative Commonwealth	Nicholas Manchur	5,759	19.98	-4.91
Social Credit	Lockie A. Miles	881	3.06	-12.44
Total valid votes		28,828	100.0	
Progressive Conservative gain from Liberal		Swing		+9.01

1957 Canadian federal election: St. Boniface
Party	Candidate	Votes	%	±%
Liberal	Louis Deniset	7,777	31.13	-12.12
Co-operative Commonwealth	Nicholas Manchur	6,216	24.88	-5.03
Progressive Conservative	Laurier Régnier	6,040	24.18	-2.65
Social Credit	Dollard Lafrenière	3,872	15.50	
Independent Liberal	Fernand Viau	1,074	4.30	
Total valid votes		24,979	100.0	
Liberal hold		Swing		-3.55
