= Laurier Régnier =

Canadian politician (1903–1990)

Laurier Arthur Régnier

Member of Parliament for St. Boniface
- In office March 1958 – June 1962
- Preceded by: Louis Deniset
- Succeeded by: Roger Teillet

Personal details
- Born: 31 August 1903 St. François Xavier, Manitoba, Canada
- Died: 8 August 1990 (aged 86)
- Party: Progressive Conservative
- Profession: barrister, farmer

Laurier Arthur Régnier (31 August 1903 – 8 August 1990) was a Progressive Conservative party member of the House of Commons of Canada. He was born in St. François Xavier, Manitoba and became a barrister and farmer by career.

== Background ==
After unsuccessful attempts to win a House of Commons seat at Selkirk in the 1949 election, and at St. Boniface in 1957, Régnier won St. Boniface in the 1958 election. He served one term, the 24th Canadian Parliament, until his defeat there in the 1962 federal election.

== Electoral record ==
1963 Canadian federal election: St. Boniface
Party	Candidate	Votes	%	±%
Liberal	Roger Teillet	13,547	40.67	+2.73
Progressive Conservative	Laurier Régnier	9,716	29.17	-0.60
New Democratic	Graham Campbell	6,184	18.57	-5.01
Social Credit	Georges-J. Forest	3,859	11.59	+2.88
Total valid votes		33,306	100.0	
Liberal hold		Swing		+1.67

1962 Canadian federal election: St. Boniface
Party	Candidate	Votes	%	±%
Liberal	Roger Teillet	12,084	37.94	+4.99
Progressive Conservative	Laurier Régnier	9,483	29.78	-14.24
New Democratic	Graham Campbell	7,508	23.57	+3.60
Social Credit	Joseph-E St Hilaire	2,773	8.71	+5.65
Total valid votes		31,848	100.0	
Liberal gain from Progressive Conservative		Swing		+9.61

1958 Canadian federal election: St. Boniface
Party	Candidate	Votes	%	±%
Progressive Conservative	Laurier Régnier	12,688	44.01	+19.83
Liberal	Louis Deniset	9,500	32.95	+1.82
Co-operative Commonwealth	Nicholas Manchur	5,759	19.98	-4.91
Social Credit	Lockie A. Miles	881	3.06	-12.44
Total valid votes		28,828	100.0	
Progressive Conservative gain from Liberal		Swing		+9.01
