= Robert Bockstael (politician) =

Canadian politician

Robert Theodore Bockstael

Member of Parliament for Saint Boniface
- In office May 22, 1979 – September 3, 1984
- Preceded by: Jack Hare
- Succeeded by: Léo Duguay

Personal details
- Born: Robert Theodore Bockstael; 15 February 1923 Saint Boniface, Manitoba, Canada
- Died: 28 June 2017 (aged 94) Winnipeg, Manitoba, Canada
- Party: Liberal
- Profession: Businessman

Robert Theodore Bockstael (15 February 1923 – 28 June 2017) was a Liberal party member of the House of Commons of Canada. A businessman by career, he was the longtime manager of Bockstael Construction in Winnipeg until his entry into politics; after Bockstael's retirement, the firm continued under the management of his son, John.

== Background ==
Bockstael initially attempted to enter national politics in a 16 October 1978 by-election at Manitoba's Saint Boniface electoral district but was defeated by Jack Hare of the Progressive Conservative party. Months later in the 1979 general election, he won the riding from Hare. After re-election in the 1980 federal election, he was defeated in the 1984 federal election by Léo Duguay of the Progressive Conservatives and left federal politics after that. Bockstael served in the 31st and 32nd Canadian Parliaments.

His nephew, also named Robert Bockstael, is a noted actor.

== Electoral history ==
1984 Canadian federal election: Saint Boniface—Saint Vital
Party	Candidate	Votes	%	±%
Progressive Conservative	Léo Duguay	19,548	39.7	+10.3
Liberal	Robert Bockstael	16,763	34.0	-11.2
New Democratic	Armand T. Bédard	11,279	22.9	-2.3
Confederation of Regions	Dennis A. Epps	1,649	3.3	
Total valid votes		49,239	100.0	

1980 Canadian federal election: Saint Boniface—Saint Vital
Party	Candidate	Votes	%	±%
Liberal	Robert Bockstael	20,076	45.2	+4.4
Progressive Conservative	Tom Denton	13,044	29.4	-5.8
New Democratic	Marc Boily	11,191	25.2	+1.5
Marxist–Leninist	Sharon Segal	57	0.1	0.0
Total valid votes		44,368	100.0	
lop.parl.ca

1979 Canadian federal election: Saint Boniface—Saint Vital
Party	Candidate	Votes	%	±%
Liberal	Robert Bockstael	19,752	40.9	+9.2
Progressive Conservative	Jack Hare	16,987	35.2	-7.4
New Democratic	Grant Wichenko	11,455	23.7	+1.7
Marxist–Leninist	Manuel Gitterman	60	0.1	
Independent	Russ Maley	56	0.1	
Total valid votes		48,310	100.0	

Canadian federal by-election, 16 October 1978
Party	Candidate	Votes	%	±%
On Mr. Guay's resignation, 23 March 1978
Progressive Conservative	Jack Hare	18,552	42.6	+6.4
Liberal	Robert Bockstael	13,804	31.7	-10.9
New Democratic	Grant Wichenko	9,570	22.0	+1.8
Social Credit	Lorne Reznowski	1,204	2.8	+1.7
Independent	Donald Bryan Oliver	281	0.6	
Independent	William Hawryluk	161	0.4	
Total valid votes		43,572	100.0	
