= Léo Duguay =

Canadian politician

Member of Parliament for St. Boniface
- In office September 4, 1984 – November 20, 1988
- Preceded by: Robert Bockstael
- Succeeded by: Ron Duhamel

Personal details
- Born: 13 March 1944 (age 82) Saint Boniface, Manitoba, Canada
- Party: Conservative

Léo Duguay (born 13 March 1944) is a Canadian politician, educator and school administrator prior to getting elected. Duguay served as a Progressive Conservative party member of the House of Commons of Canada.

== Background ==
Duguay was born in Saint Boniface, Manitoba. Duguay was elected at the riding of Saint Boniface in the 1984 federal election and served in the 33rd Canadian Parliament. He left federal politics after the 1988 federal election after being defeated by Ron Duhamel of the Liberal party.

== Archives ==
There is a Léo Duguay fonds at Library and Archives Canada. Archival reference number is R10108.

== Electoral record ==
1988 Canadian federal election: Saint Boniface—Saint Vital
Party	Candidate	Votes	%	±%
Liberal	Ronald J. Duhamel	24,117	51.5	+17.5
Progressive Conservative	Léo Duguay	15,747	33.6	-6.1
New Democratic	Alan Turner	5,012	10.7	-12.2
Reform	Gordon G. Duncan	1,281	2.7	
Libertarian	Guy Beaudry	425	0.9	
Independent	Lyle H. Cruickshank	190	0.4	
Independent	Rubin Kantorovich	43	0.1	
Total valid votes		46,815	100.0	

1984 Canadian federal election: Saint Boniface—Saint Vital
Party	Candidate	Votes	%	±%
Progressive Conservative	Léo Duguay	19,548	39.7	+10.3
Liberal	Robert Bockstael	16,763	34.0	-11.2
New Democratic	Armand T. Bédard	11,279	22.9	-2.3
Confederation of Regions	Dennis A. Epps	1,649	3.3	
Total valid votes		49,239	100.0	
