= Ron Duhamel =

Canadian politician

The Honourable Ronald J. Duhamel PC

Minister of Veterans Affairs
- In office October 18, 2000 – January 14, 2002
- Prime Minister: Jean Chrétien
- Preceded by: George Baker
- Succeeded by: Rey Pagtakhan

Secretary of State (Western Economic Diversification)
- In office June 11, 1997 – January 15, 2002
- Prime Minister: Jean Chrétien
- Minister: John Manley; Brian Tobin
- Preceded by: Jon Gerrard
- Succeeded by: Stephen Owen

Secretary of State (Science, Research and Development)
- In office June 11, 1997 – August 3, 1999
- Prime Minister: Jean Chrétien
- Minister: John Manley
- Preceded by: Jon Gerrard
- Succeeded by: Gilbert Normand

Canadian Senator from Manitoba
- In office January 15, 2002 – September 30, 2002
- Nominated by: Jean Chrétien
- Appointed by: Adrienne Clarkson

Member of Parliament for Saint Boniface
- In office November 21, 1988 – January 15, 2002
- Preceded by: Léo Duguay
- Succeeded by: Raymond Simard

Personal details
- Born: March 2, 1938 Saint Boniface, Manitoba, Canada
- Died: September 30, 2002 (aged 64) Winnipeg, Manitoba, Canada
- Party: Liberal
- Children: 3
- Education: Lakehead University (BA); University of Toronto (MA, PhD)

Ronald J. Duhamel, PC (March 2, 1938 – September 30, 2002) was a Canadian politician. He was a Liberal member of Parliament (MP) for the riding of Saint Boniface in the House of Commons of Canada. He was appointed to the Senate of Canada in 2002.

== Biography ==
Ronald Duhamel was born in Saint Boniface, Manitoba, he obtained a Bachelor of Arts (BA) from Lakehead University and a Master of Arts (MA) and Ph.D. from the University of Toronto. He was a teacher, school principal, professor at the University of Manitoba, assistant deputy minister of education, and deputy minister of education in Manitoba. He died of cancer on September 30, 2002, survived by his wife Carolyn and three daughters, Kathie, Natalie and Karine.

== Political career ==
Duhamel was elected as a Liberal candidate in the riding of Saint Boniface in the 1988 federal election. He was re-elected in 1993, 1997 and 2000. Duhamel was wildly popular in the riding and never won an election with less than 50% of the vote, winning each of his elections by 52%, 63%, 51% and 52%.

In 2000, Duhamel was appointed to the federal Cabinet by Prime Minister Jean Chrétien to the portfolio of Veterans Affairs, a post he held until 2002. Other posts he held include Parliamentary Secretary to the Minister of Public Works (Public Works and Government Services), Parliamentary Secretary to the President of the Treasury Board, Secretary of State (Science, Research and Development), Secretary of State (Western Economic Diversification), and Secretary of State (Francophonie).

Duhamel was appointed to the Senate on January 15, 2002, representing the senatorial division of Manitoba.

== Electoral history ==
2000 Canadian federal election: Saint Boniface—Saint Vital
Party	Candidate	Votes	%	±%
Liberal	Ronald J. Duhamel	20,173	52.2	+1.0
Alliance	Joyce M. Chilton	8,962	23.2	+5.2
New Democratic	John Parry	5,026	13.0	-5.0
Progressive Conservative	Mike Reilly	4,505	11.7	-0.7
Total valid votes		38,666	100.0	

1997 Canadian federal election: Saint Boniface—Saint Vital
Party	Candidate	Votes	%	±%
Liberal	Ronald J. Duhamel	18,948	51.2	-12.2
New Democratic	Peter Carney	6,663	18.0	+10.9
Reform	Denis Simard	6,658	18.0	+1.2
Progressive Conservative	Jennifer Clark	4,555	12.3	+5.1
Marxist–Leninist	Rubin Kantorovich	171	0.5	+0.3
Total valid votes		36,995	100.0	

1993 Canadian federal election: Saint Boniface—Saint Vital
Party	Candidate	Votes	%	±%
Liberal	Ronald J. Duhamel	30,041	63.4	+11.9
Reform	Alison Anderson	7,959	16.8	+14.1
Progressive Conservative	Barbara Thompson	3,404	7.2	-26.5
New Democratic	Pauline Dupont	3,354	7.1	-3.6
National	Marcelle Marion	2,008	4.2	
Canada Party	Don Dumesnil	329	0.7	
Natural Law	Ginette Robert	250	0.5	
Marxist–Leninist	Sharon Segal	59	0.1	
Total valid votes		47,404	100.0	

1988 Canadian federal election: Saint Boniface—Saint Vital
Party	Candidate	Votes	%	±%
Liberal	Ronald J. Duhamel	24,117	51.5	+17.5
Progressive Conservative	Léo Duguay	15,747	33.6	-6.1
New Democratic	Alan Turner	5,012	10.7	-12.2
Reform	Gordon G. Duncan	1,281	2.7	
Libertarian	Guy Beaudry	425	0.9	
Independent	Lyle H. Cruickshank	190	0.4	
Independent	Rubin Kantorovich	43	0.1	
Total valid votes		46,815	100.0	

26th Canadian Ministry (1993–2003) – Cabinet of Jean Chrétien
Cabinet post (1)
Predecessor	Office	Successor
George Baker	Minister of Veterans Affairs; 2000–2002	Rey Pagtakhan
Sub-Cabinet Post
Predecessor	Title	Successor
	Secretary of State (La Francophonie) (1999–2002)	Denis Paradis
