= United Fire Fighters of Winnipeg =

Trade union in Manitoba, Canada

- IAFF Local 867
- Abbreviation: UFFW
- Type: Local union
- Location: Winnipeg, Manitoba, Canada
- Members: 1,600 (including retirees)
- President: Tom Bilous
- Parent organization: International Association of Fire Fighters
- Website: uffw.ca

The United Fire Fighters of Winnipeg (UFFW) is a local union in Winnipeg, Manitoba, Canada. It is local 867 of the International Association of Fire Fighters.

== Political endorsements ==
President Alex Forrest has lent the UFFW endorsement to a number of candidates for political office.

In the 2008 federal election, President Alex Forrest lent the UFFW endorsement to Niki Ashton in Churchill.

In the 2010 Winnipeg municipal election, President Alex Forrest lent the UFFW endorsement to Mayor Sam Katz in his successful bid for re-election, against opponent Judy Wasylycia-Leis. In the 2014 municipal election, Forrest lent the UFFW endorsement to Wasylycia-Leis in her unsuccessful run to become mayor.

In the 2015 Manitoba NDP leadership contest, President Alex Forrest first lent the UFFW endorsement to leadership candidate Steve Ashton in his unsuccessful run to become leader of the party. After Steve Ashton came third on the first ballot of the Manitoba NDP leadership contest and was eliminated from the leadership race, President Alex Forrest lent the UFFW endorsement to leadership candidate Greg Selinger. In exchange for the support Selinger reportedly promised to delay the implementation of self-regulation for paramedics.

In the 2015 Canadian federal election, Alex Forrest endorsed two Liberal (Dan Vandal and Terry Duguid and two NDP (Daniel Blaikie and Pat Martin) candidates in Winnipeg swing ridings.

== Firefighters and paramedics ==
As a result of differing priorities between Winnipeg firefighters and paramedics, the Paramedics Association of Manitoba has asked the Manitoba NDP to allow Winnipeg paramedics to form a self-regulating organization, a request UFFW President Alex Forrest opposes. As a result of the UFFW endorsement Alex Forrest lent to Greg Selinger during the Manitoba NDP leadership race, the MGEU sent a letter asking for clarification on the association's self-regulation bid submitted on behalf of Winnipeg paramedics.
