= Robert Bockstael (actor) =

Canadian actor

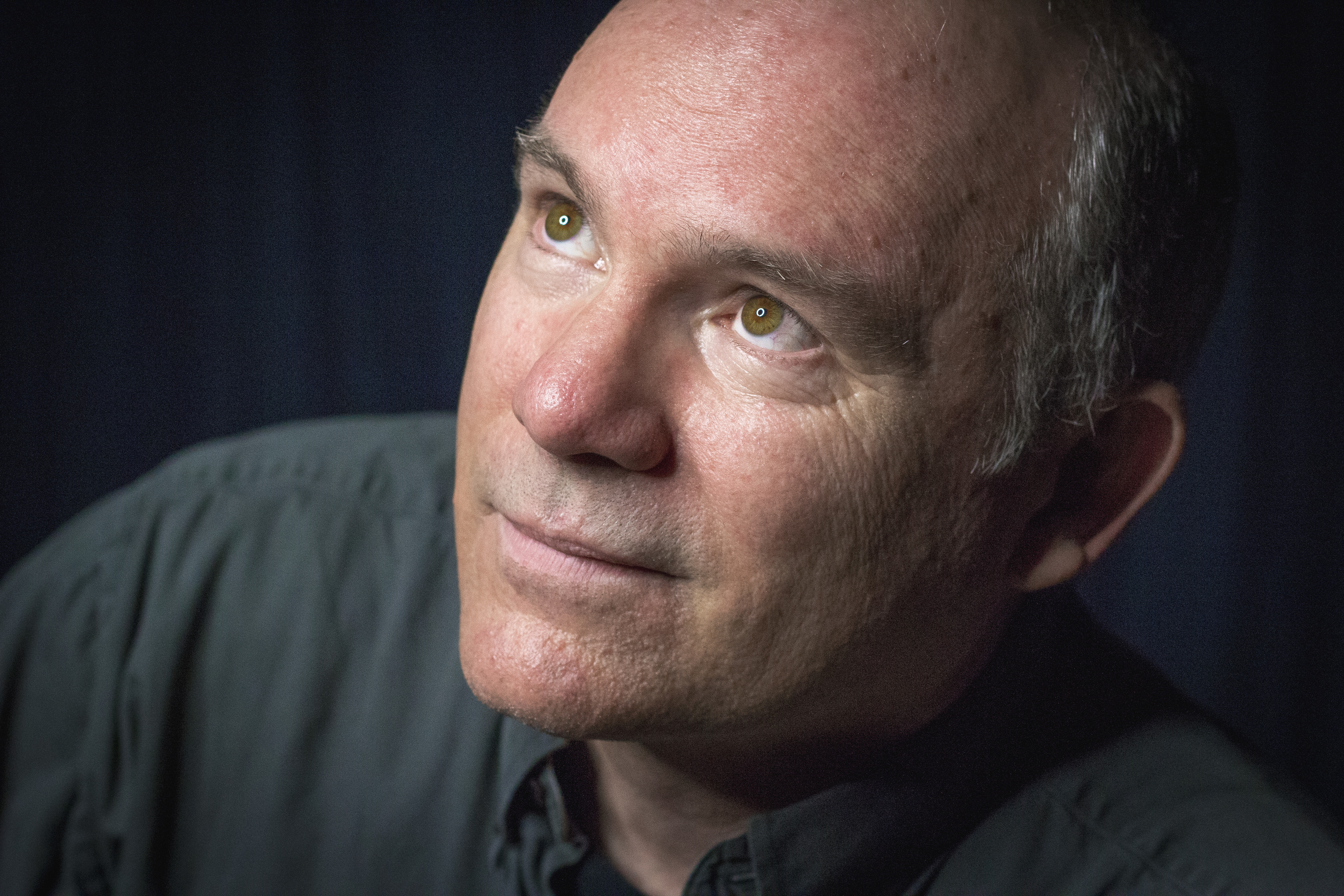
- Bockstael in 2015
- Born: May 2, 1960 (age 66); Winnipeg, Manitoba, Canada
- Occupations: Actor, director, writer
- Years active: 1985–present
- Spouse: Catherine Bockstael
- Children: 1
- Relatives: Robert Bockstael (uncle)

Robert Bockstael (born May 2, 1960) is a Canadian actor, director and writer.

== Early life ==
Bockstael was born in Winnipeg, Manitoba to Carmel and Joseph Bockstael. He is the nephew of former federal Member of Parliament, also named Robert Bockstael.

== Career ==
He is best known for his lead role as Royal Canadian Mounted Police officer Brian Fletcher in the Canadian television drama series North of 60, for which he was a two-time Gemini Award nominee for Best Actor in a Continuing Leading Dramatic Role at the 11th Gemini Awards in 1997 and the 12th Gemini Awards in 1998.

His other leads and series regular roles have included Jim Flett in Wind at My Back, Jeremy Woodsworm in Snakes and Ladders, Roy McMurtry in Trudeau, Joey Stiglic in Our Hero and Mr. Dupree in The Famous Jett Jackson, as well as voice roles in Silver Surfer, Sailor Moon, Friends and Heroes, X-Men: The Animated Series, Tales from the Cryptkeeper, Monster Force, RoboCop, The Super Mario Bros. Super Show!, Dennis the Menace, The Magic School Bus, Max & Ruby, Maxie's World, Rupert, Babar, The Adventures of Teddy Ruxpin, and The Animal Shelf.

On stage, his noted roles have included productions of George F. Walker's plays Theatre of the Film Noir, Nothing Sacred, Zastrozzi, The Master of Discipline and Beautiful City. He has performed in theatres across Canada in his one-man show Getting to Room Temperature. He was co-artistic director of the New Theatre of Ottawa as well as associate artistic director of the Great Canadian Theatre Company in Ottawa. He has directed, produced and written for film and television and is a published author of short stories. His debut novel, Willow's Run, was published in April 2022.

== Personal life ==
Bockstael is married to Catherine. They have a son Henry, who is autistic.

== Filmography ==
=== Film ===
Year	Title	Role	Notes
1989	The Midday Sun	Bron Mueller	
1995	No Contest	Sapper	
1998	All I Wanna Do	Frank Dewey	
1999	In the Blue Ground	Cpl. Brian Fletcher	
1999	Judgment Day: The Ellie Nesler Story	Daniel Driver	
1999	Top of the Food Chain	Jan Bathgate	
2002	My Name Is Tanino	Michael Garfield	
2005	The River King	Kenny	
2011	Citizen Gangster	Bank Manager	
2020	Fatman	Captain Jacobs	

=== Television ===
Year	Title	Role	Notes
1985	Rumpelstiltskin	Rumpelstiltskin	Television short
1986	The Tin Soldier	Various roles	Television film
1986–1987	The Adventures of Teddy Ruxpin	L.B., Prince Arin, Various voices	32 episodes
1988	Dennis the Menace	Various voice	13 episodes
1988	RoboCop	Alex Murphy / RoboCop (voice)	12 episodes
1989	The Super Mario Bros. Super Show!	Mouser #2, Additional voices	52 episodes
1990	Babar	Mouser #2, Additional voices	13 episodes
1990	Top Cops	Bruce	Episode: "James Garcia/Mike Coleman"
1990	Piggsburg Pigs!	Additional voices	Recurring role
1990, 1991	Street Legal	David Bodger / Brad Casey	2 episodes
1991	Drop Dead Gorgeous	Sgt. Teploe	Television film
1991	Urban Angel	Hee-Haw	Episode: "Ridin' Fire"
1991	Rupert	Additional voices	13 episodes
1992	The Birthday Dragon	Father / Boss	Television short
1992	Counterstrike	Astridge	Episode: "Cyborg"
1992, 1995	Forever Knight	Various roles	3 episodes
1993	The Hidden Room	Dr. Shepard	Episode: "No Word for Mercy"
1993, 1994	Tales from the Cryptkeeper	Additional voices	3 episodes
1994	Monster Force	Count Dracula, Mummy of HoTep, Additional voices	13 episodes
1994–1996	X-Men: The Animated Series	Ka-Zar, Sauron, Brainchild (voices)	5 episodes
1994–1997	North of 60	Cpl. Brian Fletcher	39 episodes
1995	Ultraforce	Russell Green	Episode: "Prime Time"
1996	F/X: The Series	Nicholas Breen	Episode: "Payback"
1997	La Femme Nikita	Oliver Price	Episode: "Choice"
1997	Psi Factor	Warden	Episode: "The Fog"
1997	Any Mother's Son	Captain Dinsmore	Television film
1997	The Magic School Bus	Mr. Ampier	Episode: "Gets Charged"
1997, 1998	Freaky Stories	Narrator	2 episodes
1997–2000	The Animal Shelf	Voice	52 episodes
1998	A Father for Brittany	Atty. Sam Turturro	Television film
1998	Silver Surfer	Pip the Troll	4 episodes
1998	Thanks of a Grateful Nation	Dr. Lavigello	Television film
1998	His Bodyguard	Al	Television film
1998	The Defenders: Taking the First	Karl Munro	Television film
1998	Highlander: The Raven	Donald Magnus	Episode: "The Unknown Soldier"
1998–2000	Sailor Moon	Prince Diamond, Zirconia, Tsunawataro	15 episodes
1999	The Hunt for the Unicorn Killer	Professor	Television film
1999	Dear America: The Winter of Red Snow	Papa	Television film
1999–2000	Blaster's Universe	Additional voices	13 episodes
1999–2001	Wind at My Back	Jim Flett	17 episodes
1999–2001	The Famous Jett Jackson	Mr. Dupree	13 episodes
2000	The Golden Spiders: A Nero Wolfe Mystery	Paul Kuffner	Television film
2000	D.C.	Press Secretary	Episode: "Blame"
2000–2002	Our Hero	Joey Stiglic	Supporting role
2001	Relic Hunter	Malcolm	Episode: "The Reel Thing"
2001	Snap Decision	Martin Schneider	Television film
2001	Jett Jackson: The Movie	Mr. Dupree	Television film
2001	Walter and Henry	Dr. Rothstein	Television film
2001	Jenifer	Researcher	Television film
2001	The Day Reagan Was Shot	Dick Allen	Television film
2001	Stolen Miracle	Captain Terry Dougan	Television film
2001	A Wind at My Back Christmas	Jim Flett	Television film
2001, 2002	A Nero Wolfe Mystery	Various roles	20 episodes
2001, 2004	Blue Murder	Matt McCarten / Henry Porter	2 episode
2002	Trudeau	Roy McMurtry	Television film
2002	Odyssey 5	Norbert Manson	Episode: "L.D.U. 7"
2002	The Scream Team	Richard Carlyle	Television film
2002	Body & Soul	Principal White	Episode: "Shadow Boxing"
2002	The Eleventh Hour	Keith Cannetti	Episode: "Tree Hugger"
2003	Made in Canada	Terry McKenzie	Episode: "Dock Cops"
2003	Homeless to Harvard: The Liz Murray Story	David	Television film
2003	More Than Meets the Eye: The Joan Brock Story	Dr. Corbett	Television film
2003	Defending Our Kids: The Julie Posey Story	Dennis Goodwin	Television film
2003	Thoughtcrimes	Dr. Galbraith	Television film
2003	The Newsroom	TV Executive	Episode: "Death 1, George 0"
2004	Snakes and Ladders	Jeremy Woodsworm	Television film
2004	Doc	Dr. Barker	Episode: "Choices of the Heart"
2004	Reversible Errors	Detective	Television film
2004	Lives of the Saints	Nathan Cordingley	Television film
2004	Plain Truth	George Calloway	Television film
2005	Beach Girls	Chris	5 episodes
2005	Trudeau II: Maverick in the Making	Sergeant Major	Television film
2005	Waking Up Wally: The Walter Gretzky Story	Butch	Television film
2005–2008	Delilah & Julius	Voice	31 episodes
2006	Time Bomb	Principal	Television film
2006	North/South	Manni Angelucci	
2006	A Christmas Wedding	Pastor Williams	Television film
2006	Canada Russia '72	Stuart Gibbons	2 episodes
2008	Air Crash Investigation	Captain Person	Episode: "Gimli Glider"
2008	Anne of Green Gables: A New Beginning	Overseer	Television film
2008–2009	Friends and Heroes	Antonius	12 episodes
2009	Flashpoint	Harvey Silver	Episode: "Haunting the Barn"
2009	Wild Roses	Nichols	Episode: "Time and Chance"
2010	The Wild Girl	Photo Editor	Television film
2016	Pregnant at 17	Orin	Television film
2022	House of Chains	Detective Cameron Cortez	Television film
