= St. Boniface—St. Vital =

Federal electoral district in Manitoba, Canada

Coordinates: 49.866°N 97.069°W

Manitoba electoral district
- Interactive map of riding boundaries from the 2025 federal election

Federal electoral district
- Legislature: House of Commons
MP
Ginette Lavack
Liberal
- District created: 1924
- First contested: 1925
- Last contested: 2025
- District webpage: profile, map

Demographics
- Population (2011): 84,353
- Electors (2015): 64,202
- Area (km²): 65
- Pop. density (per km²): 1,297.7
- Census division: Division No. 11
- Census subdivision: Winnipeg (part)

St. Boniface—St. Vital (French: Saint-Boniface–Saint-Vital; formerly Saint Boniface–Saint Vital) is a federal electoral district in Winnipeg, Manitoba that has been represented in the House of Commons of Canada since 1925.

The district covers roughly the southern portion of the city of Winnipeg, east of the Red River. In particular, it contains the Franco-Manitoban community of Saint Boniface and roughly the northern two-thirds of the community of St. Vital. The riding (as federal electoral districts are called in Canada) has a sizeable French population (16% according to the last census) and was a Liberal Party stronghold for most of its history. It is the only riding in Western Canada that regularly elects francophone candidates to parliament.

Following the 2022 Canadian federal electoral redistribution, this riding was renamed St. Boniface—St. Vital in English for the 2025 Canadian federal election. It gained the neighbourhood of Minnetonka from Winnipeg South.

== History ==
In 1996, its English name was changed from "St. Boniface" to "Saint Boniface". Then, Saint Boniface was renamed "Saint Boniface—Saint Vital" during the 2012 electoral redistribution, losing territory to Winnipeg South and Elmwood—Transcona while gaining territory from Winnipeg South.

The riding has traditionally been held by the Liberal Party. Conservative Shelly Glover, who was elected twice, has been the only centre-right candidate to win more than one full term in the riding's history. The riding returned to the Liberal Party in 2015 as part of a Liberal near-sweep of Winnipeg.

=== Name changes ===
The federal riding's name has undergone various changes since its creation in 1924.

Riding name
Year	English name	French name
1924–1947	St. Boniface	Saint-Boniface
1947–1952	St. Boniface	St-Boniface
1952–1996	St. Boniface	Saint-Boniface
1996–2013	Saint Boniface	Saint-Boniface
2013–present	Saint Boniface—Saint Vital	Saint-Boniface—Saint-Vital

=== Historical boundaries ===
1966 representation order

1976 representation order

1987 representation order

1996 representation order

== Demographics ==
Panethnic groups in Saint Boniface—Saint Vital (2011−2021)
Panethnic group	2021		2016		2011	
Panethnic group	Pop.	%	Pop.	%	Pop.	%
European (Note: Statistic includes all persons that did not make up part of a visible minority or an indigenous identity.)	58,165	61.99%	60,075	68.39%	61,090	74.11%
Indigenous	12,010	12.8%	10,855	12.36%	9,145	11.09%
African	6,385	6.8%	3,970	4.52%	2,690	3.26%
South Asian	5,635	6.01%	3,605	4.1%	2,630	3.19%
Southeast Asian (Note: Statistic includes total responses of "Filipino" and "Southeast Asian" under visible minority section on census.)	4,505	4.8%	3,610	4.11%	1,960	2.38%
East Asian (Note: Statistic includes total responses of "Chinese", "Korean", and "Japanese" under visible minority section on census.)	3,165	3.37%	3,065	3.49%	2,385	2.89%
Middle Eastern (Note: Statistic includes total responses of "West Asian" and "Arab" under visible minority section on census.)	1,760	1.88%	985	1.12%	955	1.16%
Latin American	1,110	1.18%	765	0.87%	760	0.92%
Other/multiracial (Note: Statistic includes total responses of "Visible minority, n.i.e." and "Multiple visible minorities" under visible minority section on census.)	1,105	1.18%	935	1.06%	800	0.97%
Total responses	93,835	98.24%	87,840	97.8%	82,430	97.72%
Total population	95,514	100%	89,818	100%	84,353	100%
Notes: Totals greater than 100% due to multiple origin responses. Demographics based on 2012 Canadian federal electoral redistribution riding boundaries.

== Members of Parliament ==
The riding has elected the following Members of Parliament:

Parliament	Years	Member	Party
St. Boniface; Riding created from Springfield and Winnipeg North
15th	1925–1926	John Power Howden	Liberal
16th	1926–1930	John Power Howden	Liberal
17th	1930–1935	John Power Howden	Liberal
18th	1935–1940	John Power Howden	Liberal
19th	1940–1945	John Power Howden	Liberal
20th	1945–1949	Fernand Viau	Liberal
21st	1949–1953	Fernand Viau	Liberal
22nd	1953–1957	Fernand Viau	Liberal
23rd	1957–1958	Louis Deniset	Liberal
24th	1958–1962	Laurier Régnier	Progressive Conservative
25th	1962–1963	Roger Teillet	Liberal
26th	1963–1965	Roger Teillet	Liberal
27th	1965–1968	Roger Teillet	Liberal
28th	1968–1972	Joseph-Philippe Guay	Liberal
29th	1972–1974	Joseph-Philippe Guay	Liberal
30th	1974–1978	Joseph-Philippe Guay	Liberal
30th	1978–1979	Jack Hare	Progressive Conservative
31st	1979–1980	Robert Bockstael	Liberal
32nd	1980–1984	Robert Bockstael	Liberal
33rd	1984–1988	Léo Duguay	Progressive Conservative
34th	1988–1993	Ron Duhamel	Liberal
35th	1993–1997	Ron Duhamel	Liberal
Saint Boniface
36th	1997–1999	Ron Duhamel	Liberal
37th	2000–2002	Ron Duhamel	Liberal
37th	2002–2004	Raymond Simard	Liberal
38th	2004–2006	Raymond Simard	Liberal
39th	2006–2008	Raymond Simard	Liberal
40th	2008–2011	Shelly Glover	Conservative
41st	2011–2015	Shelly Glover	Conservative
Saint Boniface—Saint Vital
42nd	2015–2019	Dan Vandal	Liberal
43rd	2019–2021	Dan Vandal	Liberal
44th	2021–2025	Dan Vandal	Liberal
45th	2025–present	Ginette Lavack	Liberal

== Election results ==
Graph of election results in Saint Boniface—Saint Vital (minor parties that never got 2% of the vote or didn't run consistently are omitted)

=== St. Boniface—St. Vital (2023–present) ===
2025 Canadian federal election
Party	Candidate	Votes	%	±%	Expenditures
Liberal	Ginette Lavack	32,599	59.79	+15.89	
Conservative	Shola Agboola	17,625	32.33	+4.04	
New Democratic	Thomas Linner	3,775	6.92	–14.25	
People's	Gilles Pelletier	523	0.96	–3.36	
Total valid votes/expense limit					
Total rejected ballots					
Turnout		54,522	72.05		
Eligible voters		75,672			
Liberal notional hold		Swing		+5.93	
Source: Elections Canada

=== Saint Boniface—Saint Vital (2013–2023) ===
2021 Canadian federal election: Saint Boniface—Saint Vital
Party	Candidate	Votes	%	±%	Expenditures
Liberal	Dan Vandal	19,908	43.8	+1.0	$57,062.60
Conservative	Shola Agboola	12,749	28.0	-4.6	$84,279.53
New Democratic	Meghan Waters	9,767	21.5	+4.6	$13,895.44
People's	Jane MacDiarmid	1,978	4.4	+3.2	$0.00
Green	Laurent Poliquin	676	1.5	-4.1	$1,459.10
Rhinoceros	Sébastien CoRhino	80	0.2	N/A	$0.00
Independent	Scott A. A. Anderson	58	0.1	N/A	$0.00
Independent	Naomi Crisostomo	31	0.1	N/A	$0.00
Independent	Kerri Hildebrandt	31	0.1	N/A	$0.00
Independent	Charles Currie	25	0.1	N/A	$0.00
Independent	Jean-Denis Boudreault	24	0.1	N/A	$0.00
Independent	Patrick Strzalkowski	21	<0.1	N/A	$0.00
Veterans Coalition	Matthew Correia	17	<0.1	N/A	$0.00
Independent	Denis Berthiaume	16	<0.1	N/A	$0.00
Independent	Tomas Szuchewycz	15	<0.1	N/A	$0.00
Independent	Alexandra Engering	14	<0.1	N/A	$0.00
Independent	Scott Falkingham	14	<0.1	N/A	$0.00
Independent	Ryan Huard	14	<0.1	N/A	$0.00
Independent	Eliana Rosenblum	13	<0.1	N/A	$0.00
Independent	Manon Lili Desbiens	11	<0.1	N/A	$0.00
Independent	Conrad Lukawski	7	<0.1	N/A	$0.00
Total valid votes/expense limit		45,469	99.2	–	$106,281.08
Total rejected ballots		379	0.8		
Turnout		45,848	66.3		
Eligible voters		69,204			
Liberal hold		Swing		+2.8	
Source: Elections Canada

2021 federal election redistributed results
Party	Vote	%
Liberal	21,012	43.90
Conservative	13,541	28.29
New Democratic	10,131	21.17
People's	2,067	4.32
Green	720	1.50
Others	391	0.82

2019 Canadian federal election: Saint Boniface—Saint Vital
Party	Candidate	Votes	%	±%	Expenditures
Liberal	Dan Vandal	20,300	42.88	-15.56	$44,810.61
Conservative	Rejeanne Caron	15,436	32.61	+3.92	$74,515.57
New Democratic	Billie Cross	8,037	16.98	+6.39	none listed
Green	Ben Linnick	2,671	5.64	+3.35	$2,073.90
People's	Adam McAllister	591	1.25		$4,426.19
Independent	Sharma Baljeet	303	0.64		none listed
Total valid votes/expense limit		47,338	99.43		
Total rejected ballots		269	0.57	+0.25	
Turnout		47,607	69.37	-4.61	
Eligible voters		68,631			
Liberal hold		Swing		-9.74	
Source: Elections Canada

2015 Canadian federal election: Saint Boniface—Saint Vital
Party	Candidate	Votes	%	±%	Expenditures
Liberal	Dan Vandal	28,530	58.44	+27.23	$69,923.02
Conservative	François Catellier	14,005	28.69	-21.44	$152,734.08
New Democratic	Erin Selby	5,169	10.59	-5.20	$73,670.05
Green	Glenn Zaretski	1,119	2.29	-0.59	$485.69
Total valid votes/expense limit		48,823	99.69		$200,203.09
Total rejected ballots		152	0.31	–	
Turnout		48,975	73.97	–	
Eligible voters		66,205			
Liberal gain from Conservative		Swing		+24.34	
Source: Elections Canada

2011 federal election redistributed results
Party	Vote	%
Conservative	20,261	50.13
Liberal	12,611	31.20
New Democratic	6,382	15.79
Green	1,165	2.88

=== Saint Boniface (1996–2013) ===
2011 Canadian federal election: Saint Boniface—Saint Vital
Party	Candidate	Votes	%	±%	Expenditures
Conservative	Shelly Glover	21,737	50.3	+4.0	$84,354.60
Liberal	Raymond Simard	13,314	30.8	-4.3	$82,059.23
New Democratic	Patrice Miniely	6,935	16.0	+2.9	$1,082.97
Green	Marc Payette	1,245	2.9	-2.1	$950.00
Total valid votes/expense limit		43,231	100.0		–
Total rejected ballots		181	0.4	+0.1	
Turnout		43,412	67.18	+2.86	
Eligible voters		64,620	–	–	

2008 Canadian federal election: Saint Boniface—Saint Vital
Party	Candidate	Votes	%	±%	Expenditures
Conservative	Shelly Glover	19,440	46.3	+11.3	$71,480
Liberal	Raymond Simard	14,728	35.1	-3.5	$78,353
New Democratic	Matt Schaubroeck	5,502	13.1	-8.8	$12,641
Green	Marc Payette	2,104	5.0	+1.2	$8,506
Christian Heritage	Justin Gregoire	195	0.5	-0.2	$12
Total valid votes/expense limit		41,969	100.0		$79,503
Total rejected ballots		133	0.3	-0.1	
Turnout		42,102	64.32	-1.6	

2006 Canadian federal election: Saint Boniface—Saint Vital
Party	Candidate	Votes	%	±%	Expenditures
Liberal	Raymond Simard	16,417	38.6	-8.0	$72,056
Conservative	Ken Cooper	14,893	35.0	4.0	$57,276
New Democratic	Mathieu Allard	9,311	21.9	+3.9	$23,405
Green	Marc Payette	1,640	3.9	+1.5	$4,830
Christian Heritage	Jane MacDiarmid	285	0.7	-0.3	$503
Total valid votes		42,546	100.0		–
Total rejected ballots		163	0.4	0.0	
Turnout		42,709	66.9	+6.2	

2004 Canadian federal election: Saint Boniface—Saint Vital
Party	Candidate	Votes	%	±%	Expenditures
Liberal	Raymond Simard	17,989	46.6	+3.8	$64,019
Conservative	Ken Cooper	11,956	31.0	-8.1	$71,843
New Democratic	Mathieu Allard	6,954	18.0	+3.0	$9,928
Green	Daniel Backé	925	2.4	–	$202
Christian Heritage	Jeannine Moquin-Perry	378	1.0	0.0	$7,690
Marijuana	Chris Buors	317	0.8	-1.3	–
Communist	Gérard Guay	77	0.2	–	$654
Total valid votes		38,596	100.0		–
Total rejected ballots		130	0.3		
Turnout		38,726	60.7		

Canadian federal by-election, 13 May 2002
Party	Candidate	Votes	%	±%
On Mr. Duhamel being called to the Senate, 15 January 2002
Liberal	Raymond Simard	8,862	42.8	-9.3
Alliance	Denis Simard	4,497	21.7	-1.4
Progressive Conservative	Mike Reilly	3,583	17.3	5.7
New Democratic	John Parry	3,106	15.0	+2.0
Marijuana	Chris Buors	435	2.1	
Christian Heritage	Jean-Paul Kabashiki	210	1.0	
Total valid votes		20,693	100.0	

2000 Canadian federal election: Saint Boniface—Saint Vital
Party	Candidate	Votes	%	±%
Liberal	Ronald J. Duhamel	20,173	52.2	+1.0
Alliance	Joyce M. Chilton	8,962	23.2	+5.2
New Democratic	John Parry	5,026	13.0	-5.0
Progressive Conservative	Mike Reilly	4,505	11.7	-0.7
Total valid votes		38,666	100.0	

1997 Canadian federal election: Saint Boniface—Saint Vital
Party	Candidate	Votes	%	±%
Liberal	Ronald J. Duhamel	18,948	51.2	-12.2
New Democratic	Peter Carney	6,663	18.0	+10.9
Reform	Denis Simard	6,658	18.0	+1.2
Progressive Conservative	Jennifer Clark	4,555	12.3	+5.1
Marxist–Leninist	Rubin Kantorovich	171	0.5	+0.3
Total valid votes		36,995	100.0	

=== St. Boniface (1924–1996) ===
1993 Canadian federal election: Saint Boniface—Saint Vital
Party	Candidate	Votes	%	±%
Liberal	Ronald J. Duhamel	30,041	63.4	+11.9
Reform	Alison Anderson	7,959	16.8	+14.1
Progressive Conservative	Barbara Thompson	3,404	7.2	-26.5
New Democratic	Pauline Dupont	3,354	7.1	-3.6
National	Marcelle Marion	2,008	4.2	
Canada Party	Don Dumesnil	329	0.7	
Natural Law	Ginette Robert	250	0.5	
Marxist–Leninist	Sharon Segal	59	0.1	
Total valid votes		47,404	100.0	

1988 Canadian federal election: Saint Boniface—Saint Vital
Party	Candidate	Votes	%	±%
Liberal	Ronald J. Duhamel	24,117	51.5	+17.5
Progressive Conservative	Léo Duguay	15,747	33.6	-6.1
New Democratic	Alan Turner	5,012	10.7	-12.2
Reform	Gordon G. Duncan	1,281	2.7	
Libertarian	Guy Beaudry	425	0.9	
Independent	Lyle H. Cruickshank	190	0.4	
Independent	Rubin Kantorovich	43	0.1	
Total valid votes		46,815	100.0	

1984 Canadian federal election: Saint Boniface—Saint Vital
Party	Candidate	Votes	%	±%
Progressive Conservative	Léo Duguay	19,548	39.7	+10.3
Liberal	Robert Bockstael	16,763	34.0	-11.2
New Democratic	Armand T. Bédard	11,279	22.9	-2.3
Confederation of Regions	Dennis A. Epps	1,649	3.3	
Total valid votes		49,239	100.0	

1980 Canadian federal election: Saint Boniface—Saint Vital
Party	Candidate	Votes	%	±%
Liberal	Robert Bockstael	20,076	45.2	+4.4
Progressive Conservative	Tom Denton	13,044	29.4	-5.8
New Democratic	Marc Boily	11,191	25.2	+1.5
Marxist–Leninist	Sharon Segal	57	0.1	0.0
Total valid votes		44,368	100.0	
lop.parl.ca

1979 Canadian federal election: Saint Boniface—Saint Vital
Party	Candidate	Votes	%	±%
Liberal	Robert Bockstael	19,752	40.9	+9.2
Progressive Conservative	Jack Hare	16,987	35.2	-7.4
New Democratic	Grant Wichenko	11,455	23.7	+1.7
Marxist–Leninist	Manuel Gitterman	60	0.1	
Independent	Russ Maley	56	0.1	
Total valid votes		48,310	100.0	

Canadian federal by-election, 16 October 1978
Party	Candidate	Votes	%	±%
On Mr. Guay's resignation, 23 March 1978
Progressive Conservative	Jack Hare	18,552	42.6	+6.4
Liberal	Robert Bockstael	13,804	31.7	-10.9
New Democratic	Grant Wichenko	9,570	22.0	+1.8
Social Credit	Lorne Reznowski	1,204	2.8	+1.7
Independent	Donald Bryan Oliver	281	0.6	
Independent	William Hawryluk	161	0.4	
Total valid votes		43,572	100.0	

1974 Canadian federal election: Saint Boniface—Saint Vital
Party	Candidate	Votes	%	±%
Liberal	Joseph-Philippe Guay	21,853	42.6	-1.9
Progressive Conservative	Jack Hare	18,604	36.2	+10.1
New Democratic	Jim Garwood	10,364	20.2	-7.5
Social Credit	Thomas L. Cruickshank	536	1.0	-0.2
Total valid votes		51,357	100.0	

1972 Canadian federal election: Saint Boniface—Saint Vital
Party	Candidate	Votes	%	±%
Liberal	Joseph-Philippe Guay	22,200	44.4	-7.3
New Democratic	Joseph F. Sherwood	13,857	27.7	+0.6
Progressive Conservative	Peter Hillcoff	13,033	26.1	+7.2
Social Credit	Gilles J. Ouellet	643	1.3	-0.9
Independent	Russ Maley	241	0.5	
Total valid votes		49,974	100.0	

1968 Canadian federal election: Saint Boniface—Saint Vital
Party	Candidate	Votes	%	±%
Liberal	Joseph-Philippe Guay	22,032	51.7	+9.9
New Democratic	Harry Shafransky	11,566	27.2	+0.4
Progressive Conservative	Vaughan L. Baird	8,048	18.9	-12.6
Social Credit	Georges Forest	949	2.2	
Total valid votes		42,595	100.0	

1965 Canadian federal election: St. Boniface
Party	Candidate	Votes	%	±%
Liberal	Roger Teillet	13,961	41.82	+1.15
Progressive Conservative	Harry Deleeuw	10,499	31.45	+2.28
New Democratic	Harry Shafransky	8,923	26.73	+8.16
Total valid votes		33,383	100.0	
Liberal hold		Swing		-0.57

1963 Canadian federal election: St. Boniface
Party	Candidate	Votes	%	±%
Liberal	Roger Teillet	13,547	40.67	+2.73
Progressive Conservative	Laurier Régnier	9,716	29.17	-0.60
New Democratic	Graham Campbell	6,184	18.57	-5.01
Social Credit	Georges-J. Forest	3,859	11.59	+2.88
Total valid votes		33,306	100.0	
Liberal hold		Swing		+1.67

1962 Canadian federal election: St. Boniface
Party	Candidate	Votes	%	±%
Liberal	Roger Teillet	12,084	37.94	+4.99
Progressive Conservative	Laurier Régnier	9,483	29.78	-14.24
New Democratic	Graham Campbell	7,508	23.57	+3.60
Social Credit	Joseph-E St Hilaire	2,773	8.71	+5.65
Total valid votes		31,848	100.0	
Liberal gain from Progressive Conservative		Swing		+9.61

1958 Canadian federal election: St. Boniface
Party	Candidate	Votes	%	±%
Progressive Conservative	Laurier Régnier	12,688	44.01	+19.83
Liberal	Louis Deniset	9,500	32.95	+1.82
Co-operative Commonwealth	Nicholas Manchur	5,759	19.98	-4.91
Social Credit	Lockie A. Miles	881	3.06	-12.44
Total valid votes		28,828	100.0	
Progressive Conservative gain from Liberal		Swing		+9.01

1957 Canadian federal election: St. Boniface
Party	Candidate	Votes	%	±%
Liberal	Louis Deniset	7,777	31.13	-12.12
Co-operative Commonwealth	Nicholas Manchur	6,216	24.88	-5.03
Progressive Conservative	Laurier Régnier	6,040	24.18	-2.65
Social Credit	Dollard Lafrenière	3,872	15.50	
Independent Liberal	Fernand Viau	1,074	4.30	
Total valid votes		24,979	100.0	
Liberal hold		Swing		-3.55

1953 Canadian federal election: Saint Boniface—Saint Vital
Party	Candidate	Votes	%	±%
Liberal	Fernand Viau	8,051	43.3	-14.1
Co-operative Commonwealth	Leonard S. Evans	5,568	29.9	+0.9
Progressive Conservative	George Campbell MacLean	4,994	26.8	+13.2
Total valid votes		18,613	100.0	

1949 Canadian federal election: Saint Boniface—Saint Vital
Party	Candidate	Votes	%	±%
Liberal	Fernand Viau	10,766	57.3	+20.4
Co-operative Commonwealth	Andrew Russell Paulley	5,455	29.0	-0.4
Progressive Conservative	Louis Léger	2,557	13.6	-7.3
Total valid votes		18,778	100.0	

1945 Canadian federal election: Saint Boniface—Saint Vital
Party	Candidate	Votes	%	±%
Liberal	Fernand Viau	6,055	37.0	-14.8
Co-operative Commonwealth	Évariste-Rupert Gagnon	4,823	29.4	+18.1
Progressive Conservative	George Campbell MacLean	3,421	20.9	-2.5
Social Credit	Charles Anderson Bailey	1,369	8.4	-3.7
Labor–Progressive	Jules Jerome Pynoo	710	4.3	
Total valid votes		16,378	100.0	

1940 Canadian federal election: Saint Boniface—Saint Vital
Party	Candidate	Votes	%	±%
Liberal	John Power Howden	7,926	51.8	-5.0
National Government	George Campbell MacLean	3,578	23.4	+6.2
Social Credit	Philippe Guay	1,839	12.0	+7.2
Co-operative Commonwealth	George Henry Barefoot	1,739	11.4	-6.4
Independent	Morris Jacob	216	1.4	
Total valid votes		15,298	100.0	

1935 Canadian federal election: Saint Boniface—Saint Vital
Party	Candidate	Votes	%	±%
Liberal	John Power Howden	7,353	56.8	+5.1
Co-operative Commonwealth	Edwin Arnold Hansford	2,304	17.8	+3.5
Conservative	Joseph-Placide Bertrand	2,222	17.2	-16.8
Social Credit	Victor James Gray	624	4.8	
Reconstruction	Thomas Boniface Molloy	438	3.4	
Total valid votes		12,941	100.0	

1930 Canadian federal election: Saint Boniface—Saint Vital
Party	Candidate	Votes	%	±%
Liberal	John Power Howden	7,045	51.7	+0.7
Conservative	Edgar Honwell Cook	4,630	34.0	+6.0
Labour	Edwin Arnold Hansford	1,943	14.3	-6.7
Total valid votes		13,618	100.0	

1926 Canadian federal election: Saint Boniface—Saint Vital
Party	Candidate	Votes	%	±%
Liberal	John Power Howden	5,903	51.0	+3.6
Conservative	Joseph Bernier	3,235	28.0	+3.9
Labour	Allan Meikle	2,427	21.0	-7.6
Total valid votes		11,565	100.0	

1925 Canadian federal election: Saint Boniface—Saint Vital
Party	Candidate	Votes	%
Liberal	John Power Howden	4,819	47.4
Independent Labour	Allan Meikle	2,901	28.5
Conservative	George Campbell MacLean	2,442	24.0
Total valid votes		10,162	100.0

== See also ==
- List of Canadian electoral districts
- Historical federal electoral districts of Canada
