= Jack Hare =

Canadian politician

Member of Parliament for St. Boniface
- In office October 16, 1978 – May 21, 1979
- Preceded by: Joseph-Philippe Guay
- Succeeded by: Robert Bockstael

Personal details
- Born: 8 June 1920 Vancouver, British Columbia, Canada
- Died: 23 March 2009 (aged 88) Winnipeg, Manitoba, Canada
- Party: Conservative

John Harold Hare (June 8, 1920 – March 23, 2009) was a Canadian politician, agrologist and professor.

== Political career ==
Hare was the Progressive Conservative Member of Parliament for the Winnipeg-area riding of St. Boniface for seven months. He was elected in a 1978 by-election in what was considered a safe Liberal seat after losing to Revenue minister Joseph Guay in the 1974 federal election. Hare won in part by capitalizing on the dislike of Prime Minister Pierre Trudeau by anglophone voters, in a riding that has a significant francophone population and claimed that French Canadians followed instructions from their parish priests on how to vote. Hare's victory was the first time the Tories won the riding since the 1958 election landslide by John Diefenbaker's Conservatives. The by-election (one of 15 held on the same day across the country) was seen as a litmus test for the Trudeau government.

Despite the defeat of Trudeau's government by Joe Clark's Progressive Conservatives in the 1979 federal election, Hare would not serve long as an MP as Liberal challenger Robert Bockstael won the St. Boniface seat back. Joe Borowski, co-ordinator of the anti-abortion group Campaign Life, claimed that his group's work was the main reason for Hare's defeat. He died in Winnipeg in 2009.
