= Veterans Affairs Canada =

Canadian government department

- Anciens Combattants Canada

Department overview
- Formed: 1944
- Type: Department responsible for Veterans
- Jurisdiction: Canada
- Employees: 3,188
- Minister responsible: Jill McKnight, Minister of Veterans Affairs and Associate Minister of National Defence
- Deputy Minister responsible: Nancy Gardiner, Deputy Minister of Veterans Affairs; Associate Deputy Minister of Veterans Affairs
- Website: www.veterans.gc.ca

Veterans Affairs Canada (VAC; French: Anciens Combattants Canada) (Note: Veterans Affairs Canada is the applied title under the Federal Identity Program; the legal title is Department of Veterans Affairs.) is the department of the Government of Canada with responsibility for pensions, benefits and services for military veterans, former and current members of the Canadian Armed Forces and Royal Canadian Mounted Police (RCMP), their families, as well as some civilians.

== History ==
=== Creation ===
During World War I, it became clear that a coordinated approach was needed to deal with ill and injured soldiers. On February 21, 1918, the Department of Civil Re-establishment was created for that purpose. Subsequently, on June 11, 1928, the Government for Canada created the Department of Pensions and National Health, which took over responsibility for caring for ill and injured soldiers Following World War II, the volume of soldiers returning home made it clear that the Government of Canada would require a department dedicated entirely to serving ill and injured veterans. Consequently, in 1944 Prime Minister Mackenzie King's government passed a motion that officially created the Department of Veterans Affairs.

Canada operated a benefits program similar to the American G.I. Bill for its World War II veterans, with a strong economic impact similar to the American case. A war veteran's eligibility for certain benefits depended on the veteran's "overseas" status, defined by Veterans Affairs as having served at least two miles offshore from Canada. In the Second World War (1939–45) Canada did not yet include Newfoundland, which became a Canadian province in 1949. Thus, World War I and World War II veterans who served in Newfoundland (with Royal Newfoundland Regiment and Newfoundland Royal Naval Reserve) are considered by Veterans Affairs to be "overseas veterans" (and as such may be referred to the British Service Personnel and Veterans Agency).

In the late 1970s, Prime Minister Pierre Elliott Trudeau undertook an initiative to decentralize government away from Ottawa. He and his Minister of Veterans Affairs, Daniel J. MacDonald (Member of Parliament for Cardigan) devised the plan to move the headquarters of the Department of Veterans Affairs from Ottawa to Charlottetown, Prince Edward Island. The department's head office has been located in the Daniel J. MacDonald Building in PEI's capital since 1980. In the early 21st century, a second building two blocks from the DJM, the Jean Canfield Building, was constructed to house Veterans Affairs and other federal government offices. The department has become a major economic contributor to PEI, and has had an important impact on Charlottetown's cultural landscape. Veterans Affairs Canada is the only major federal department whose headquarters is located outside of Ottawa.

=== Programs ===
The department is largely responsible for medical care, rehabilitation, commemoration, and disability pensions and awards for Veterans. Appeals from departmental decisions on disability pensions and awards are presented by Veterans to the Veterans Review and Appeal Board; mainly with the assistance of lawyers from the semi-autonomous Bureau of Pensions Advocates free of charge.

=== Veterans' Bill of Rights ===
In 2007, the Veterans' Bill of Rights was passed by the Harper government. The bill included a statement that Veterans Affairs Canada must show veterans respect.

=== 2010 Privacy Breach ===
In her October 2010 report, resulting from formal complaints made by a veteran of the 1991 Gulf War in Afghanistan, who had become a vocal critic of Veterans Affairs, federal Privacy Commissioner Jennifer Stoddart uncovered evidence of widespread privacy issues at the VAC. Her report found that the privacy former Captain Sean Bruyea, who had been medically-released from the military, had been violated by VAC when his "medical and financial details had been circulated" to numerous departmental officials, after he had criticized the New Veterans Charter and the way Afghanistan veterans were being treated by the government. Stoddart said that this was "deeply concerning" and a violation of the Privacy Act. A 2010 VFC conference call transcript revealed that a senior veterans official had responded to Bruyea's actions by saying, "It's time to take the gloves off."

Veterans Affairs Minister Jean-Pierre Blackburn, apologized on behalf of the Government of Canada for its privacy breach and settled the suit in November 2010.

=== Christopher Garnier case ===
In 2018, controversy arose when it was discovered that convicted murderer, Christopher Garnier, was receiving Veterans Affairs Canada funded treatment for post traumatic stress disorder (PTSD). Garnier had been convicted of the 2015 murder of off-duty Police Constable Catherine Campbell in Halifax, Nova Scotia. The controversy stemmed from the fact Garnier had never served in the Canadian armed forces or RCMP and the PTSD was said to be brought on by the murder for which he was convicted. Garnier was eligible for Veterans Affairs Canada benefits as his father had served in the armed forces.

== Remembrance initiatives ==
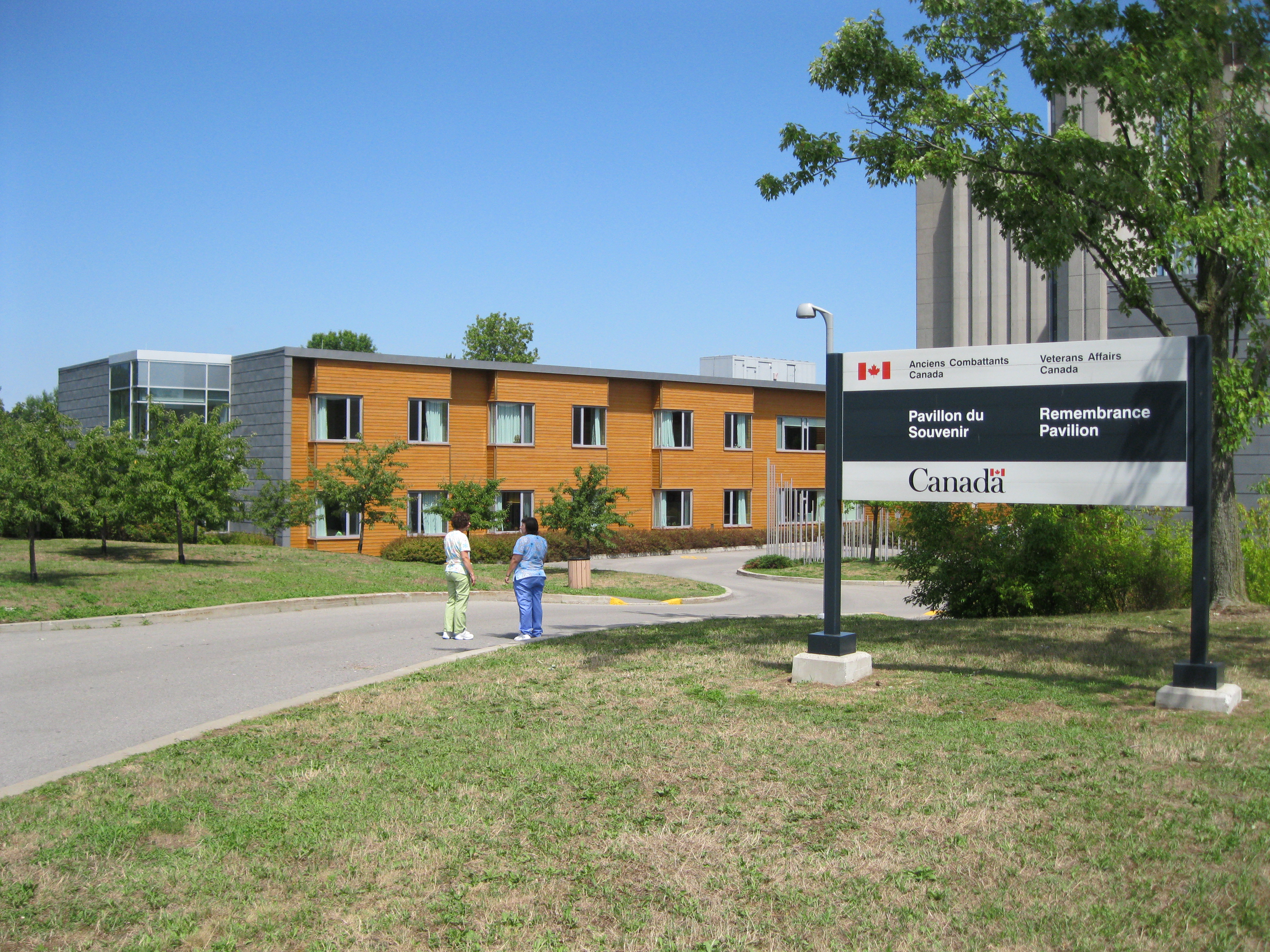
Remembrance Pavilion at Ste. Anne's Hospital in Montreal

The Canada Remembers program is responsible for all war commemoration activities, such as Remembrance Day, and coordinates and funds various "pilgrimages" for Canadian war veterans to foreign battlefields and international ceremonies (e.g. the 50th anniversary of the Liberation of the Netherlands in early 1995, the 60th anniversary of D Day on June 6, 2004).

The Government of Canada declared 2005 the Year of the Veteran. Its purpose was to teach, remember, thank, honour and celebrate. The image of a poppy overlapping a gold maple leaf became a special symbol during the campaign, on posters, pamphlets, bookmarks and documents.

On November 9, 2008, the Honourable Greg Thompson, the-then Minister of Veterans Affairs, attended a Service of Remembrance at the Canada Memorial in Green Park, London, England, which Canada had recently assumed responsibility for; the memorial pays tribute to the nearly one million Canadian men and women who served in the United Kingdom during the First and Second World Wars.

== VAC Stakeholder Committee Members ==
- Veterans Affairs Canada (the Deputy Minister serves as Chair of the Committee)
- Army, Navy and Air Force Veterans (ANAVETs) in Canada
- Department of National Defence & the Canadian Armed Forces
- Royal Canadian Legion
- National Council of Veterans Associations
- Canadian Association of Veterans in United Nations Peacekeeping
- Canadian Veterans Advocacy
- Gulf War Veterans Association of Canada
- Canadian Peacekeeping Veterans Association
- NATO Veterans Organization of Canada
- VeteransofCanada.ca
- VeteranVoice.info
- Veterans UN-NATO Canada
- Royal Canadian Mounted Police Veterans’ Association
- Royal Canadian Mounted Police

== Issues ==
=== New Veterans Charter ===
The benefits program administered by Veterans Affairs Canada to ill and injured soldiers was rarely changed since its creation after World War I. The result was a number of out-dated policies that no longer suited the needs of Canada's veterans. This program gave a life-time pension to an individual who was ill or injured due to military service.

In 2005, all parties in the House of Commons passed the New Veterans Charter. This Charter replaced the life-time pension award with a lump sum payment award and used life-time pension payments much more sparingly. The Charter came into force on 1 April 2006 under Prime Minister Stephen Harper's minority government.

Under the New Veterans Charter, an ill or injured member may receive a lump sum payment of a maximum of $550,000 tax-free, ($300,000 lump sum and $250,000 disbursement insurance) as well as a maximum monthly, taxable pension of $9685.

In July 2013, Prime Minister Stephen Harper appointed Julian Fantino as the Minister of Veterans Affairs. Fantino quickly indicated that he was open to amending the New Veterans Charter to ensure veterans received the benefits and support they deserved.

In the spring of 2014, the all-party Standing Committee on Veterans Affairs met to discuss updates to the New Veterans Charter. The result was the unanimously-supported report titled The New Veterans Charter: Moving Forward, which was tabled in Parliament in June 2014. The committee made 13 recommendations to update the New Veterans Charter to close loopholes and ensure Canada's veterans would continue to receive the support and care that they deserve. In October 2014, the government responded, saying they agreed with the "spirit and intent" of all 13 recommendations and would begin working on the recommendations immediately.

=== Mobile Application ===
Veterans Affairs Canada has recently launched a suite of mobile applications aimed at aiding Veterans with accessing services offered by VAC. These include Veterans Matter, OSI Connect, and PTSD Coach Canada.

== Current Veterans Affairs Canada structure ==
- Minister of Veterans Affairs
  - Deputy Minister
    - Associate Deputy Minister
    - Senior Assistant Deputy Minister, Service Delivery
    - Assistant Deputy Minister, Commemoration and Public Affairs
    - Assistant Deputy Minister, Chief Financial Officer and Corporate Services
    - Assistant Deputy Minister, Strategic Policy, Planning and Performance
    - Audit and Evaluation
    - Human Resources
  - Bureau of Pensions Advocates
  - Office of the Veterans Ombudsman

== Ministers of Veterans Affairs and precursor departments ==
Ministers of Soldiers' Civil Re-establishment

- 1918-1920 — Sir James A Lougheed, PC, KCMG, QC
- 1920-1921 — Sir James A Lougheed, PC, KCMG, QC, Senator (acting)
- 1921 — Dr Robert J Manion, MC
- 1921-1926 — Dr Henri Severin Beland, Senator
- 1926 — John Campbell Elliott, KC
- 1926 — Dr Robert J Manion, MC (acting)
- 1926 — Dr Raymond D Morand (acting)
- 1926 — Dr Eugene Paquet
- 1926-1928 — Dr James H King

Ministers of Pensions and National Health

- 1928-1930 — Dr James H King, Senator
- 1930 — James L Ralston, PC, CMG, DSO, KC
- 1930-1934 — Dr Murray MacLaren, PC, CMG, VD
- 1934-1935 — Dr Donald M Sutherland, PC, DSO, VD
- 1935-1939 — Charles G. Power, MC, KC
- 1939-1944 — Ian A Mackenzie, KC

Ministers of Veterans Affairs

- 1944-1948 — Ian A Mackenzie, KC
- 1948-1950 — Milton F Gregg, VC, PC, OC, CBE, MC, ED, CD
- 1950-1957 — Hughes Lapointe, PC, QC
- 1957-1960 — Alfred J Brooks, PC, VD, QC
- 1960-1963 — Gordon Churchill, PC, DSO, ED, QC
- 1963 — Marcel JA Lambert, PC, QC
- 1963-1968 — Roger Joseph Teillet, PC
- 1968-1972 — Jean-Eudes Dube, PC, OC, QC
- 1972 — Arthur Lang, PC
- 1972-1979 — Daniel J MacDonald, PC
- 1979-1980 — Allan B McKinnon, PC, MC, CD
- 1980 — Daniel J. MacDonald, PC
- 1980-1981 — J Gilles Lamontagne, PC, OC, CQ, CD (acting)
- 1981-1984 — W Bennett Campbell, PC
- 1984-1988 — George Hees, PC, OC
- 1988-1993 — Gerald Merrithew, PC, CD
- 1993 — A Kim Campbell, PC
- 1993 — Peter L McCreath, PC
- 1993-1996 — David Collenette, PC
- 1993-1997 — Lawrence MacAulay, PC (as Secretary of State for Veterans Affairs)
- 1997-1999 — Fred Mifflin, PC, CD
- 1999-2000 — George Baker, PC
- 2000-2001 — Ronald J Duhamel, PC
- 2002-2003 — Dr Rey Pagtakhan, PC
- 2003-2004 — John McCallum, PC
- 2004-2006 — Albina Guarnieri, PC
- 2006-2010 — Greg Thompson, PC
- 2010-2011 — Jean-Pierre Blackburn, PC
- 2011-2013 — Steven Blaney, PC
- 2013-2015 — Julian Fantino, PC
- 2015 — Erin O'Toole, PC
- 2015-2017 — Kent Hehr, PC
- 2017-2019 — Seamus O'Regan, PC
- 2019 — Jody Wilson-Raybould, PC
- 2019 — Harjit Sajjan, PC (acting)
- 2019-2023 — Lawrence MacAulay, PC
- 2023-2024 — Ginette Petitpas Taylor, PC
- 2024-2025 — Darren Fisher, PC
- 2025-2025 — Élisabeth Brière, PC
- 2025- - Jill McKnight, PC

== Deputy Ministers of Veterans Affairs and precursor departments ==
Deputy Ministers of Soldiers' Civilian Re-establishment

- 1918 — Samuel A. Anderson
- 1918 — Frank Healey
- 1919-1920 — FG Robinson
- 1920-1928 — Norman F Parkinson

Deputy Ministers of Pensions and National Health

- 1919-1933 — Dr JA Amyot, CMG
- 1933-1944 — Dr RE Wodehouse, OBE

Deputy Ministers of Veterans Affairs

- 1944-1950 — Walter S Woods, CMG
- 1950-1955 — Eedson LM Burns, CC, DSO, OBE, MC, CD
- 1954-1955 — G Lucien Lalonde, OBE, ED (acting)
- 1955-1963 — G Lucien Lalonde, OBE, ED
- 1963-1967 — Paul M Pelletier
- 1968 — Ernest A Cote, MBE
- 1968-1974 — John S Hodgson, OBE
- 1974-1975 — William B Brittain, DFC (acting)
- 1975-1985 — William B Brittain, DFC
- 1985-1987 — Pierre P Sicard
- 1987-1992 — David Broadbent, CD
- 1992-1993 — David Nicholson (acting)
- 1993-1994 — Nancy Hughes Anthony
- 1994-1999 — David Nicholson
- 1999-2003 — Larry Murray, CMM, CD
- 2003-2006 — Jack Stagg
- 2006-2007 — Verna Bruce (acting)
- 2007-2012 — Suzanne Tining
- 2012-2014 — Mary Chaput
- 2014 — Anne Marie Smart (acting)
- 2014-2021 — Walt Natynczyk, OC, CMM, MSC, CD
- 2021-2025 — Paul Ledwell
- 2025-2026 — Christine McDowell (acting)
- 2026- — Nancy Gardiner

== See also ==
- Minister of Veterans Affairs (Canada)
