= Bureau of Pensions Advocates =

- Bureau of Pensions Advocates; Bureau de services juridiques des pensions (fr)

Agency overview
- Formed: October 1, 1930 as the Veterans' Bureau (renamed Bureau of Pensions Advocates April 1, 1971)
- Jurisdiction: Government of Canada
- Headquarters: Charlottetown, Prince Edward Island, Canada; 46°14′8.03″N 63°7′35″W
- Minister responsible: Jill McKnight, Minister of Veterans Affairs
- Agency executives: -Chantelle Bowers, Executive Director & Chief Pensions Advocate.; -Steve Woodman, Senior Director, Legal Operations.
- Website: http://www.veterans.gc.ca/eng/about-us/organization/bureau-pensions-advocates

The Bureau of Pensions Advocates (BPA) is a nation-wide, semi-independent law firm within Canada's Department of Veterans Affairs (also known as Veterans Affairs Canada). In place in one form or another since October 1, 1930, it provides free counsel and legal representation to Canadian Veterans and members of the Royal Canadian Mounted Police in appeals before the Veterans Review and Appeal Board regarding Veterans Affairs Canada decisions on their disability pension and award applications.

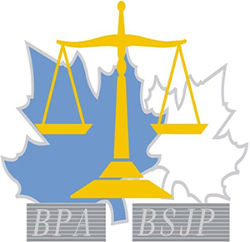
Bureau of Pensions Advocates logo

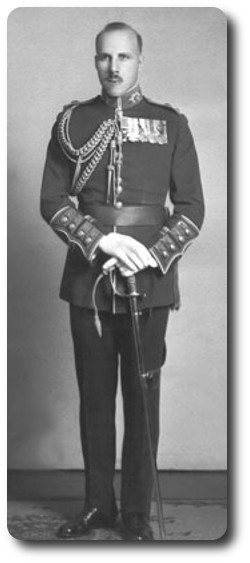
Colonel C. Beresford Topp, CBE, DSO, MC. First Chief Pensions Advocate 1930-1943, and 1945-1955

== Mandate ==
The Bureau of Pensions Advocates offers free legal advice and representation to Veterans and serving members of the Canadian Armed Forces, Veterans and serving members of the Royal Canadian Mounted Police, former members of Canada's Merchant Navy, and eligible family members before the Veterans Review and Appeal Board of Canada (VRAB) on Department of Veterans Affairs decisions related to the following Illness or Injury Benefits: Disability Pension, Critical Injury Benefit, Additional Pain and Suffering Compensation, and Exceptional Incapacity Allowance, as well as the following Income Support Benefits: Survivor's Pension and War Veteran's Allowance.

BPA lawyers, also referred to as "advocates", and support staff assist clients with reviews, appeals, and applications for reconsideration before VRAB. Given their experience in pension and disability matters, they are considered specialists in the area of claims for Veterans' disability pensions and awards. Over 98% of people appearing before VRAB are represented by BPA lawyers. BPA lawyers do not work for VRAB. Before appealing a decision to VRAB, BPA Advocates may, where appropriate, also assist clients with departmental reviews of their decisions.

BPA was established pursuant to section 6.1(1) of the Department of Veterans Affairs Act.

== BPA's Legacy ==
Through its representation of its clients before the Veterans Review and Appeal Board, the Bureau of Pensions Advocates has contributed to the advancement of legislation and policy related to disability benefits for military Veterans and RCMP members in Canada. On some issues it was well ahead of the curve, putting forward interpretations that would later become accepted norms within Canadian society. Some of these include:

- Gender Equality (including challenging traditional views on issues of harassment)
- LGBTQ Equality (including extending benefits for same sex couples)
- Mental Health (putting forward arguments around PTSD before it was a fully-recognized diagnosis)
- Expansion of Who Qualifies as a "Veteran"
- Refinement of the Definition of "On Duty" for the Purpose of Qualifying for Disability Benefits
- Advancement of the Right to Benefits for Veterans' Survivors

== Relevant Legislation ==
The Bureau of Pensions Advocates was established and operates pursuant to the Department of Veterans Affairs Act and the Veterans Review and Appeal Board Act. BPA lawyers work to obtain benefits for Veteran clients and eligible family members under the Pension Act, the Veterans Well-being Act, and the War Veterans Allowance Act. BPA lawyers also work on behalf of members of the Royal Canadian Mounted Police and eligible family members, both of whom receive benefits under the Pension Act only (the RCMP is not subject to the Veterans Well-being Act).

== Partners ==
The Bureau of Pensions Advocates maintains a close working relationship with the Royal Canadian Legion (RCL), which includes training of RCL service officers as well as the co-representation of numerous clients before the Veterans Review and Appeal Board. BPA also cooperates with the Office of the Veterans Ombudsman to resolve complex cases and discuss policy approaches to Veterans' benefits. In addition, the Bureau works with Veterans Affairs Canada's Service Delivery Branch to divert cases away from the VRAB redress process and back to the department by way of departmental reviews where feasible, in an effort to resolve cases expeditiously. BPA also maintains working relationships with the Canadian Armed Forces through the CAF-VAC Liaison Officer, and with the Royal Canadian Mounted Police through the RCMP-VAC Liaison Officer, and collaborate on training initiatives as well as on complex files.

== Services Offered ==
Applicants for a disability pension or award who are not satisfied with the Department of Veterans Affairs' decision may seek the services of the Bureau of Pensions Advocates at no cost to them. A BPA lawyer will review the client's file and may offer the following advice:

Departmental Review

Recommend a Departmental Review. In this case, the client may have been missing a piece of documentation or evidence in their application to the Department that could help the Department grant the disability pension or award requested. The lawyer will assist the client in submitting the information to the Department.

Accept the Department's Decision

Recommend against appealing because the Department's decision on the client's first application appears to be correct. Regardless of the lawyer's recommendation, the client has an absolute right (absent any fraud or issues of ethics) to instruct the lawyer to proceed to Review should the client wish to do so.

VRAB Review

Recommend proceeding to the Veterans Review and Appeal Board for a Review hearing. The lawyer will prepare and present an oral argument to a two-member panel. In a split decision, where one of the two panel members agrees and the other does not, the tie is resolved in favour of the client. At this level, the client is entitled to appear personally (at the Department's expense) and provide oral evidence with the assistance of his/her BPA lawyer. Regardless of the lawyer's recommendation, the client has an absolute right (absent any fraud or issues of ethics) to instruct the lawyer to proceed should the client wish to do so.

VRAB Appeal

Recommend proceeding to the Veterans Review and Appeal Board for an Appeal hearing. The lawyer will prepare and present a submission in writing (which sometimes is presented orally as well) to a three-member panel. Appeals generally deal with any errors in law or fact that the Review Board may have made. Errors in law or fact may include, for example, a misinterpretation of the law, or the improper consideration of evidence presented. The lawyer will provide the client with a copy of the written argument before the hearing. Only two of the three panel members need agree with the client for the disability pension or award to be granted. Although clients do not normally address the Board at the Appeal stage, they are entitled to attend the hearing (at their own expense). Regardless of the lawyer's recommendation to proceed to an Appeal or not, the client has an absolute right (absent any fraud or issues of ethics) to instruct the lawyer to proceed should the client wish to do so.

Application for Reconsideration

Discuss the possibilities for an Application for Reconsideration. After the Board's Appeal decision, if the client is still not satisfied, a Reconsideration hearing may, under exceptional circumstances, be held. Reconsiderations are not available to clients as of right; the client, or the client's lawyer, must apply for a hearing, which must be granted by VRAB before it can proceed.

If, after having exhausted his/her appeal options, a client is still dissatisfied, s/he may (at their own expense) appeal to the Federal Court of Canada. The Bureau of Pensions Advocates does not currently have the authority to represent individual clients at the Federal Court. Clients proceeding to the Federal Court of Canada with their own private lawyer or representing themselves should be aware that the Federal Court does not have the jurisdiction to impose its own decision to grant a disability pension or award. Instead, the Court considers how the Veterans Review and Appeal Board made its decision. If the Court deems that the decision was arrived at in an incorrect manner (e.g., the Board misinterpreted the law, or did not properly consider evidence presented), it can advise the Board of the error and direct it to reconsider the case (not to be confused with an Application for Reconsideration discussed above). At this point, the Bureau of Pensions Advocates may again represent the client (free of charge) before the Board as it reconsiders the matter.

== Issues That Are Appealed Most ==
The issues that are most appealed by clients are:

Entitlement

Entitlement has to do with whether a client has a right to a benefit. The issue most dealt with under Entitlement is proving that the illness or injury was a result of, or directly connected to, service in the Canadian Armed Forces or the Royal Canadian Mounted Police.

Assessment

Assessment is the determination of the severity of the illness or injury that resulted from, or was directly connected to, service. This will determine the amount of compensation the client will receive.

Retroactivity

Retroactivity looks at how far back payment of a benefit should begin.

== History and Evolution ==
=== Pre-Confederation ===
The concept of compensation of Veterans in Canada began even before Confederation for demobilized soldiers of New France, and soldiers of the American Revolutionary War, the War of 1812, and the Fenian Raids. These Veterans were given land as a way of helping them ease back into civilian life.

The first disability pensions were introduced in 1866 to further compensate militiamen wounded or disabled as a result of hostile invasion of Canada during the Fenian Raids launched from the United States, as well as to the widows and orphans of those killed in battle. These benefits were subsequently extended to those who took part in quelling the North West Rebellion of 1885.

=== World War I ===
The First World War, with its heavy casualties and the need to help over 400,000 returning veterans ease back into civilian life, required a greater degree of government involvement. The first initiative came in 1915. As a result of the lack of any public health system in Canada in the early 20th century, and in order to deal with the growing number of returning wounded Veterans, the Canadian government established the Military Hospitals Commission. In the century following the First World War, a growing list of programs and services have been added to the resources and benefits available to Veterans.

=== 1918 Department of Soldiers' Civil Re-establishment (February 21, 1918 - June 10, 1928) ===
Responsibility for veterans' issues was given to the Department of Soldiers' Civil Re-establishment.

=== 1919 Right of Appeal ===
The first right of appeal for Veterans related to their pension decisions came in the Pension Act of 1919 where, pursuant to section 18, "Two or more Commissioners shall sit for the purpose of hearing the appeals of dissatisfied applicants..."

=== 1922 The Roots of BPA: Royal Commission on Pensions and Re-establishment ===
In 1922 the Royal Commission on Pensions and Re-establishment noted, "The complaint is made that it has been found necessary for applicants to procure the intervention of some third person or organization in presenting their claims. There is evidence that where the claim has been taken up intelligently and aggressively by an organization, the application which had previously failed finally succeeded ..." As a result, the Commission recommended that

"(a) ... officials should give to the applicant 'correct and clear statements as to the principles upon which pensions are granted, indicate the lines along which evidence is required, and, where possible, utilize any available staff in assisting the soldier in procuring and putting into shape this information'; (b) That wide publicity be given to the appointment of the Official Soldiers' Advisor so that applicants and their friends will automatically take up cases with him direct and regard him as the most effective channel of communication."

The Government of Canada's Department of Soldiers Civil Re-establishment accepted and implemented this recommendation in 1923, before the Royal Commission had even finished its work. Section 7 of the Department of Soldiers' Civil Re-establishment Act 1923 provided for the following: "The Governor in Council may... appoint... an ex-member of the forces, to be known as the Official Soldiers' Advisor, whose duties shall be generally to advise and assist ex-members of the forces in matters pertaining to re-establishment, treatment and pension..."

=== 1928 Department of Pensions and National Health (June 11, 1928 - July 4, 1944) ===
Responsibility for veterans' issues was moved from the Department of Soldiers' Re-Establishment to the Department of Pensions and National Health.

=== 1930 Special Committee on Pensions and Returned Soldiers' Problems ===
In 1930 the role of the Official Soldiers' Advisor was formalized as a result of the recommendation of the Special Committee on Pensions and Returned Soldiers' Problems: "...authority should be given for the organization of a Veterans' Bureau staffed with pension advocates... It will be the duty of the pension advocates to prepare on behalf of the applicant the material which should be submitted to the Tribunal in support of the application..."

The Committee's report identified the rationale for the establishment of the Veterans' Bureau: "The most vital and fundamental requirement in any plan for reorganization was that adequate provision should be made for thorough preparation of every case. Witnesses... emphasized this, pointing out that no matter what judicial machinery was established, preparation of the case for consideration of that body was the crux of the whole matter."

The Veterans' Bureau came into active operation on October 1, 1930.

=== 1932 Special Committee to Investigate Complaints Regarding the Administration of the Pension Act ===
While the formal establishment of a Veterans' Bureau in 1930 helped veterans work their way through the application process, it did not solve all of the challenges faced by the Pension Commission. The Special Committee established in 1932 to investigate complaints made by veterans organizations stated that "... the Board of Pension Commissioners is seriously hampered in its work by having to consider cases, not prepared or insufficiently prepared... Up to August 31, 1931, ... more than 10 per cent had been referred back to the Tribunal for rehearing generally on the ground that the case had not been properly presented... nothing can be accomplished unless we make provision for extending and strengthening the Veterans' Bureau..."

Consequently, in 1933 the role of the Veterans' Bureau's pension advocates was enhanced with the following amendment (Bill 78): "Section 10(g)(2). Pension advocates hereafter appointed shall, as far as may be practicable, be barristers or advocates of good standing at the bar of any of the provinces of Canada." The requirement that, where feasible, pension advocates be lawyers, was intended to improve the quality of cases being presented to the Pension Commission. It was not, however, meant to establish a solicitor and client relationship between the advocate and the veteran. That would come later, in 1971, after further reforms.

=== 1940s and World War II ===
In the mid 1940s the responsibilities of the Veterans' Bureau to assist in the preparation of applications arising out of service in World War I were continued for veterans of World War II.

=== 1944 Department of Veterans Affairs (Canada) (1944 - present) ===
By the time of World War II, five federal departments were involved in programs pertaining to veterans. Responsibility for the care and re-establishment of veterans was for the first time consolidated under a single Minister in one federal Department, the newly established Department of Veterans Affairs.

=== 1948 & 1960 Royal Canadian Mounted Police ===
In 1948, the Veterans' Bureau also began to assist RCMP members when the Department of Veterans Affairs assumed responsibility for adjudicating and assessing disability pension applications under the RCMP Pension Continuation Act.

BPA services to the RCMP expanded in 1960 with the passage of the RCMP Superannuation Act, which gave the Department of Veterans Affairs the authority to adjudicate pension-related health care benefits for the RCMP as well.

=== 1968 Wood's Committee to Survey the Organization and Work of the Canadian Pension Commission ===
In 1968, "The Committee to Survey the Organization and Work of the Canadian Pension Commission", more commonly known as "The Woods Committee", presented its extensive report. The Woods Report and its aftermath came to constitute a high-water mark in veterans policy in Canada. Headed by Saskatchewan Court of Appeal Justice Mervyn J. Woods, its recommendations enhanced and solidified the Bureau of Pensions Advocates.

Justice Mervyn J Woods, Chair of the Woods Committee

It included the following steps intended to increase the credibility and independence of the Bureau:

- the re-naming of the Veterans' Bureau as the Bureau of Pensions Advocates,
- the establishment of the Bureau as a separate agency reporting directly to the Minister of Veterans Affairs,
- the requirement that all BPA advocates be lawyers and members in good standing of a Canadian provincial or territorial law society,
- that the Bureau represent the veteran regardless of the merits of the case if that be the wish of the applicant,
- that Advocates now also provide legal 'counselling services' to their Veteran clients,
- and, most importantly, the establishment of a solicitor-client relationship between the Veteran and his/her Bureau lawyer.

These recommendations and structural changes were implemented in 1971 and had a major impact on the role of the Bureau: "The role of the advocate is unique in that his responsibility is to assist the applicant for pension, and the only duty he owes to his employer (the Crown) is to do his utmost to assist this applicant. An applicant for pension has the right to expect from the advocate, without charge, the same service as an applicant would demand of his solicitor in civil legislation."

Among the Woods Committee's recommendations not adopted by the government was that authority for the Bureau's existence be removed from the Pension Act and placed in separate legislation.

=== 1983 Move From Ottawa to Charlottetown, Prince Edward Island ===
Prime Minister Pierre Elliot Trudeau and his Minister of Veterans Affairs throughout most of the 1970s, Daniel J. MacDonald (M.P., Cardigan), moved to decentralize the federal government by relocating the department's headquarters from Ottawa to Charlottetown, PEI. As a result, the first departmental employees to relocate arrived in Charlottetown in June 1979. In August 1983, the Bureau of Pensions Advocates' head office and its Appeal Unit moved out of the East Memorial Building in Ottawa and into temporary accommodations in Charlottetown, and then into its permanent new offices in the newly constructed Daniel J. MacDonald Building in May 1984. The new building, housing 900 employees, was officially opened the following month. There had never before been such a move in the history of the Government of Canada, and nothing on the same scale has been attempted since.

=== 1995 Pension Reform ===
The Pension Reform initiative of 1995 took place during a difficult financial period for the Government of Canada and was intended to reduce the number of organizations involved in the veterans' benefits process, thereby streamlining the entire structure and making it more efficient. With respect to the Bureau of Pensions Advocates, it led to the following changes:

- BPA's independent agency status was revoked and the Bureau became a part of the newly restructured Department of Veterans Affairs,
- BPA's Chief Pensions Advocate would no longer be a Governor-in-Council appointment and became a full public servant, and
- BPA would no longer be involved in assisting clients with their first applications, and would focus entirely on representing clients appealing VAC pension decisions before the newly created Veterans Review and Appeal Board.

(Occurring almost concurrently with these Pension Reform initiatives, BPA's right to appeal cases to the Federal Court of Canada was clarified by a Department of Justice legal opinion limiting it to matters of interpretation of the Pension Act on issues affecting larger numbers of veterans; BPA could no longer represent individual veterans before the Federal Court.)

In addition to assisting veterans with appeals, until 1995 lawyers from the Bureau of Pensions Advocates also prepared and submitted all first applications for disability pensions to the Canadian Pension Commission (CPC) on behalf of veterans. The CPC would then make its decision, and the Department of Veterans Affairs would make the pension payments. If a Veteran was not satisfied with the CPC's decision on first application, he/she could appeal to the Canadian Pension Commission for a review of its first application decision using a BPA lawyer. If the Veteran was still dissatisfied, he/she could launch an appeal to the Veterans Appeal Board, again with BPA legal representation.

Then, in 1995, the part of BPA's resources dedicated to helping veterans submit their first applications for benefits was moved from BPA to VAC's Veterans Services branch (later to be known as the Service Delivery branch), where newly established Pension Officers helped veterans prepare and submit first applications to Pension Adjudicators, also within the VS branch. (In addition, the Department of Veterans Affairs went from simply paying the pensions awarded to veterans by the Canadian Pension Commission, to making the decision itself. Also, the Canadian Pension Commission, which heard first-level appeals, and the Veterans Appeal Board, which heard second-level appeals, were amalgamated into the then newly established Veterans Review and Appeal Board, which became a quasi-judicial tribunal.)

As a result of the 1995 pension reform, the Department of Veterans Affairs became responsible for all veterans' programs, services and benefits, in addition to the payment of pensions. The Bureau of Pensions Advocates became a part of the department and was responsible solely for representing clients before the newly established Veterans Review and Appeal Board. The solicitor-client relationship between the veteran and BPA was maintained.

=== 2000 Quality of Life Initiative - Pension While Still Serving ===
In October 2000, the federal government implemented a number of initiatives to deal with the perception that the average soldier's quality of life was not all it could be. As a result, Bill C-41 allowing members of the Canadian Forces to collect a disability pension while still serving was adopted. This created an entirely new category of eligible clients that significantly increased BPA's workload.

=== 2007 Advocates Without Borders Initiative ===
In 2007, the Bureau of Pensions Advocates was internally restructured pursuant to the Advocates Without Borders initiative. It moved from an organization of 15 separate law firms from coast to coast working in isolation, to a single national law firm with offices sharing standardized business processes, coordinating and equitably distributing client cases across the country. This major initiative helped equalize both workloads for Bureau staff, and turn-around-times for Bureau clients.

=== 2020-21 COVID-19 Global Pandemic ===
When Veterans Affairs Canada employees were sent home on March 13, 2020 as a result of the pandemic, BPA’s operations were paralyzed due to its until then heavily paper-based business process. In the weeks and months that followed, the Bureau completely transformed those processes into virtual ones, allowing employees to begin serving clients from their home offices. This was a major reshaping of how the Bureau carried out its work and, in a larger sense, how the work environment evolved in Canada.

== Evolution of Responsibility for Veterans Issues In Canada ==
Department of Soldiers' Civil Re-establishment: February 21, 1918 - June 10, 1928

Department of Pensions and National Health: June 11, 1928 - July 4, 1944

Department of Veterans Affairs (Canada): 1944–present

== List of Chief Pensions Advocates ==
The position of Chief Pensions Advocate (CPA) was established on October 1, 1930, with the creation of the Veterans' Bureau, and was continued in 1971 under its successor organization, the Bureau of Pensions Advocates.

| No. | NAME | TENURE | NOTES |
|---|---|---|---|
| 1 | Colonel Charles Beresford Topp, D.S.O., M.C. | 1930 - 1943 | Became the 1st Chief Pensions Advocate with the establishment of the new Veterans' Bureau in 1930; was in active service from 1940 to 1945 as Commandant at Lansdowne Park, Ottawa, Commanding Officer 4th Canadian Brigade and of 17th Canadian Brigade during WWII. |
| * | E.V. Wilson | 1943 - 1945 | *Acting while C.B. Topp was on active duty. |
| [1 cont'd] | Colonel Charles Beresford Topp, C.B.E, D.S.O., M.C. | 1945 - 1955 | Managed the intake of Veteran clients from the Korean War. Longest-serving Chief Pensions Advocate to date; Veteran of WWI and WWII; Upon his death in 1976 he held the rank of Brigadier-General. |
| 2 | Brigadier P.E. Reynolds, E.D. | 1955 - 1969 | Was Deputy CPA before becoming CPA; was appointed Director Legal Services for VAC in 1965 and held both that and BPA's CPA position til Feb 1969, when legal services were transferred to the Department of Justice, and Reynolds transferred to the Department of Justice. |
| * | Donald Kinsey Ward | 1969 | *Acting pending appointment of new CPA after P.E. Reynolds was transferred to the Department of Justice. |
| 3 | Donald Kinsey Ward, Q.C. | 1969 - 1977 | Was Acting CPA and Deputy CPA before becoming CPA. Oversaw Veterans' Bureau become Bureau of Pensions Advocates in 1971, the establishment of solicitor-client relationship, and the establishment of BPA as an independent operating agency. |
| 4 | Lloyd Treleaven Aiken | 1977 - 1982 | Was Deputy CPA before becoming CPA. |
| 5 | Major Lawrence M. "Chub" Hanway, M.C., E.D., C.D. | 1982 - 1984 | Was Deputy CPA before becoming CPA. |
| * | Evan R. Elkin | 1984 - 1985 | *Acting pending appointment of new CPA after retirement of L.M. Hanway. |
| 6 | André Lemieux | 1985 - 1992 | Was Deputy CPA before becoming CPA. |
| 7 | Keith D. Bell | 1992 - 1995 | Was the last governor-in-council appointment. |
| * | Evan R. Elkin | 1995 - 1996 | *Acting pending appointment of new CPA after departure of K.D. Bell. |
| 8 | Simon Coakeley | 1996 - 2001 | The CPA ceased to be a governor-in-council appointment and became a public servant; oversaw BPA become part of the department. |
| 9 | Rick MacLeod | 2001 - 2004 | Was Deputy CPA before becoming CPA; the Deputy CPA position subsequently abolished. |
| * | Eric C. Marinacci | 2004 | *Acting |
| [9 cont'd] | Rick MacLeod | 2004 | Protected the CPA's right to appear before the Federal Court of Canada on matters of interpretation |
| * | Eric C. Marinacci | 2004 | *Acting pending appointment of new CPA after departure of R. MacLeod. |
| * | Evan R. Elkin | 2004 - 2005 | *Acting pending appointment of new CPA. |
| 10 | Anthony Saez | 2005 - 2009 | Second-longest serving CPA. The position title expanded to become 'Executive Director and Chief Pensions Advocate'; Introduced the Advocates Without Borders operating model that consolidated BPA into a single national law firm. |
| * | Brian McKenna | 2009 | *Acting while A. Saez served as DG Communications, and DG Human Resources. |
| * | Charles "Cha" Keliher | 2010 | *Acting |
| * | Brian McKenna | 2011 - 2012 | *Acting while A. Saez served as DG Communications, and DG Human Resources. |
| [10 cont'd] | Anthony Saez | 2012 - 2026 | Oversaw the demographic shift from WWI, WWII and Korean War Veteran clients, to still-serving, Peacekeeping, Gulf War and Afghan War Veteran clients, among others. Managed transition from paper-based operations to virtual as a result of the COVID-19 Global Pandemic. |
| 11 | Chantelle Bowers | 2026 - incumbent | First female Chief Pensions Advocate. |
