= Minister of Veterans Affairs (Canada) =

Canadian cabinet minister

- Ministre des Anciens Combattants
- Incumbent; Jill McKnight since May 13, 2025
- Veterans Affairs Canada
- Style: The Honourable
- Member of: Parliament; Privy Council; Cabinet
- Reports to: Parliament; Prime Minister
- Appointer: Monarch (represented by the governor general); on the advice of the prime minister
- Term length: At His Majesty's pleasure
- Inaugural holder: Ian Alistair Mackenzie
- Formation: 18 October 1944
- Salary: CA$299,900 (2024)
- Website: www.veterans.gc.ca

The minister of veterans affairs (French: ministre des anciens combattants) is a member of the Cabinet of Canada and the minister of the Crown responsible for Veterans Affairs Canada (VAC). Since 2015, the minister has concurrently been appointed the associate minister of national defence.

VAC is the department of the Government of Canada responsible for administering benefits for members and veterans of the Canadian Armed Forces, the Royal Canadian Mounted Police, and their family members and caregivers.

== History ==
The position was created in the Canadian Cabinet in 1944. The Department of Veterans Affairs was created out of the Department of Pensions and National Health, and was given the responsibility of administering benefits for war veterans. Its first responsibility was assisting in the reintegration of demobilized soldiers into civilian life and assisting them with health care, education, employment, income support, and pensions.

The department is largely responsible for medical care, rehabilitation, and disability pensions and awards for veterans. Appeals from departmental decisions on disability pensions and awards are presented by veterans to the Veterans Review and Appeal Board; Veterans Affairs Canada provides veterans appearing before the Board with the assistance of lawyers from the semi-autonomous Bureau of Pensions Advocates free of charge.

== List of ministers ==
Key:

Liberal Party of Canada
Progressive Conservative Party of Canada
Conservative Party of Canada

Prior to 1944, the responsibilities of the current Veterans Affairs portfolio were part of the now-defunct post of Minister of Pensions and National Health.

No.	Portrait	Name	Term of office		Political party	Ministry
1		Ian Alistair Mackenzie	October 18, 1944	January 18, 1948	Liberal	16 (King)
2		Milton Gregg	January 19, 1948	November 15, 1948	Liberal	16 (King)
2		Milton Gregg	November 15, 1948	August 6, 1950	Liberal	17 (St. Laurent)
3		Hugues Lapointe	August 7, 1950	June 20, 1957	Liberal	17 (St. Laurent)
4		Alfred Johnson Brooks	June 21, 1957	October 10, 1960	Progressive Conservative	18 (Diefenbaker)
5		Gordon Churchill	October 11, 1960	February 11, 1963	Progressive Conservative	18 (Diefenbaker)
6		Marcel Lambert	February 12, 1963	April 21, 1963	Progressive Conservative	18 (Diefenbaker)
7		Roger Teillet	April 22, 1963	April 19, 1968	Liberal	19 (Pearson)
7		Roger Teillet	April 20, 1968	July 5, 1968	Liberal	20 (P. E. Trudeau)
8		Jean-Eudes Dubé	July 6, 1968	January 27, 1972	Liberal	20 (P. E. Trudeau)
9		Arthur Laing	January 28, 1972	November 26, 1972	Liberal	20 (P. E. Trudeau)
10		Daniel J. MacDonald	November 27, 1972	June 3, 1979	Liberal	20 (P. E. Trudeau)
11		Allan McKinnon	June 4, 1979	March 2, 1980	Progressive Conservative	21 (Clark)
(10)		Daniel J. MacDonald (2nd time)	March 3, 1980	September 30, 1980	Liberal	22 (P. E. Trudeau)
–		Gilles Lamontagne (acting)	October 1, 1980	September 21, 1981	Liberal	22 (P. E. Trudeau)
12		W. Bennett Campbell	September 22, 1981	June 29, 1984	Liberal	22 (P. E. Trudeau)
12		W. Bennett Campbell	June 30, 1984	September 16, 1984	Liberal	23 (Turner)
13		George Hees	September 17, 1984	September 14, 1988	Progressive Conservative	24 (Mulroney)
14		Gerald Merrithew	September 18, 1988	January 3, 1993	Progressive Conservative	24 (Mulroney)
15		Kim Campbell	January 4, 1993	June 24, 1993	Progressive Conservative	24 (Mulroney)
16		Peter McCreath	June 25, 1993	November 3, 1993	Progressive Conservative	25 (Campbell)
17		David Collenette	November 4, 1993	October 4, 1996	Liberal	26 (Chrétien)
18		Doug Young	October 5, 1996	June 10, 1997	Liberal	26 (Chrétien)
19		Fred Mifflin	June 11, 1997	August 2, 1999	Liberal	26 (Chrétien)
20		George Baker	August 3, 1999	October 17, 2000	Liberal	26 (Chrétien)
21		Ron Duhamel	October 18, 2000	January 14, 2002	Liberal	26 (Chrétien)
22		Rey Pagtakhan	January 15, 2002	December 11, 2003	Liberal	26 (Chrétien)
23		John McCallum	December 12, 2003	July 19, 2004	Liberal	27 (Martin)
24		Albina Guarnieri	July 20, 2004	February 5, 2006	Liberal	27 (Martin)
25		Greg Thompson	February 6, 2006	January 16, 2010	Conservative	28 (Harper)
26		Jean-Pierre Blackburn	January 19, 2010	May 18, 2011	Conservative	28 (Harper)
27		Steven Blaney	May 18, 2011	July 15, 2013	Conservative	28 (Harper)
28		Julian Fantino	July 15, 2013	January 5, 2015	Conservative	28 (Harper)
29		Erin O'Toole	January 5, 2015	November 4, 2015	Conservative	28 (Harper)
30		Kent Hehr	November 4, 2015	August 28, 2017	Liberal	29 (J. Trudeau)
31		Seamus O'Regan	August 28, 2017	January 14, 2019	Liberal	29 (J. Trudeau)
32		Jody Wilson-Raybould	January 14, 2019	February 12, 2019	Liberal	29 (J. Trudeau)
–		Harjit Sajjan (acting)	February 12, 2019	March 1, 2019	Liberal	29 (J. Trudeau)
33		Lawrence MacAulay	March 1, 2019	July 26, 2023	Liberal	29 (J. Trudeau)
34		Ginette Petitpas Taylor	July 26, 2023	December 20, 2024	Liberal	29 (J. Trudeau)
35		Darren Fisher	December 20, 2024	March 14, 2025	Liberal	29 (J. Trudeau)
36		Élisabeth Brière	March 14, 2025	May 13, 2025	Liberal	30 (Carney)
37		Jill McKnight	May 13, 2025	present	Liberal	30 (Carney)

== Military service ==
Many ministers, all of whom were officers, have had prior military experience. The posting does not, however, require prior military service.

Name	Branch	Notable units	Rank	Service period
Milton Fowler Gregg	Canadian Army	Royal Canadian Regiment, The Black Watch (Royal Highland Regiment) of Canada	Brigadier	World War I, World War II
Hugues Lapointe	Canadian Army	Régiment de la Chaudière	Lieutenant colonel	World War II
Gordon Churchill	Canadian Army	1st Canadian Armoured Carrier Regiment	Lieutenant colonel	World War I, World War II
Marcel Lambert	Canadian Army	King's Own Calgary Regiment	Lieutenant colonel	World War II
Roger Teillet	Royal Canadian Air Force	No. 35 Squadron RAF	Flight lieutenant	World War II
Daniel J. MacDonald	Canadian Army -	The Prince Edward Island Highlanders, Cape Breton Highlanders	Lieutenant colonel	World War II
Allan McKinnon	Canadian Army	Princess Patricia's Canadian Light Infantry	Major	World War II
Gilles Lamontagne	Royal Canadian Air Force	425 Bomber Squadron	Flight lieutenant	World War II
George Hees	Canadian Army	5th Canadian Infantry Brigade	Brigade major	World War II
Gerald Merrithew	Canadian Army	Royal New Brunswick Regiment	Lieutenant colonel	Militia pre-1970s
Fred Mifflin	Royal Canadian Navy	HMCS Saguenay, HMCS Skeena, deputy commander – Maritime Command	Rear admiral	Cold War 1954–1987
Erin O'Toole	Royal Canadian Air Force	423 Maritime Helicopter Squadron, 406 Maritime Operational Training Squadron	Captain	1991–2000s
Harjit Sajjan (acting)	Canadian Army	The British Columbia Regiment (Duke of Connaught's Own)	Lieutenant-colonel	1989–2015
