= Robert Yanow =

Senior Officer in the Royal Canadian Navy (1984-1987)

- Born: 4 February 1933; Saskatoon, Saskatchewan
- Died: 19 November 2017 (aged 84); Victoria, British Columbia
- Military career
- Allegiance: Canada
- Branch: Royal Canadian Navy
- Service years: 1950s–1980
- Rank: Rear-Admiral
- Commands: HMCS Saguenay; HMCS Athabaskan; First Destroyer Squadron; Commander Maritime Forces Pacific and Pacific region commander
- Awards: Commander of the Order of Military Merit (Canada); Knight of the Order of Saint John; Canadian Forces' Decoration

Rear-Admiral Robert Yanow CMM CD KStJ was a Royal Canadian Navy senior officer who served as Commander of Maritime Forces Pacific from 1984 to 1987.

Yanow was born in Saskatoon, was a Sea Cadet and graduated from Royal Roads Military College in 1951.

Yanow joined the Navy after graduating from the University of Saskatchewan, and rose the ranks to become commanding officer of HMCS Saguenay in 1969 and HMCS Athabaskan in 1972.

He later became naval attaché in Washington, D.C., Commander of Maritime Forces Pacific and ended his career at the DND HQ in Ottawa.
