= Royal Legion =

Royal Legion may refer to:

- Royal British Legion
- Royal Canadian Legion
