= Yanow =

Yanow is a surname. Notable people with the surname include:

- Dvora Yanow, political ethnographer and interpretive methodologist
- Scott Yanow (born 1954), American jazz reviewer, historian, and author
- Robert Yanow (1933–2017), Canadian Navy officer
- Sophie Yanow (born 1987), American artist and graphic novelist
