= Royal Canadian Legion =

Canadian veterans' organization

The Royal Canadian Legion Légion royale canadienne
- Official Badge
- Abbreviation: RCL
- Formation: 25 November 1925; 100 years ago
- Type: Veterans' organization
- Legal status: Nonprofit organization
- Headquarters: Dominion Command; 86 Aird Place; Ottawa
- Location: Canada
- Region served: Worldwide
- Members: 232,359 (2022)
- Grand Patron: Governor General of Canada
- Honorary Grand President: Larry Murray
- Dominion President: Berkley Lawrence
- Affiliations: Royal Commonwealth Ex-Services League
- Website: www.legion.ca
- Formerly called: Canadian Legion

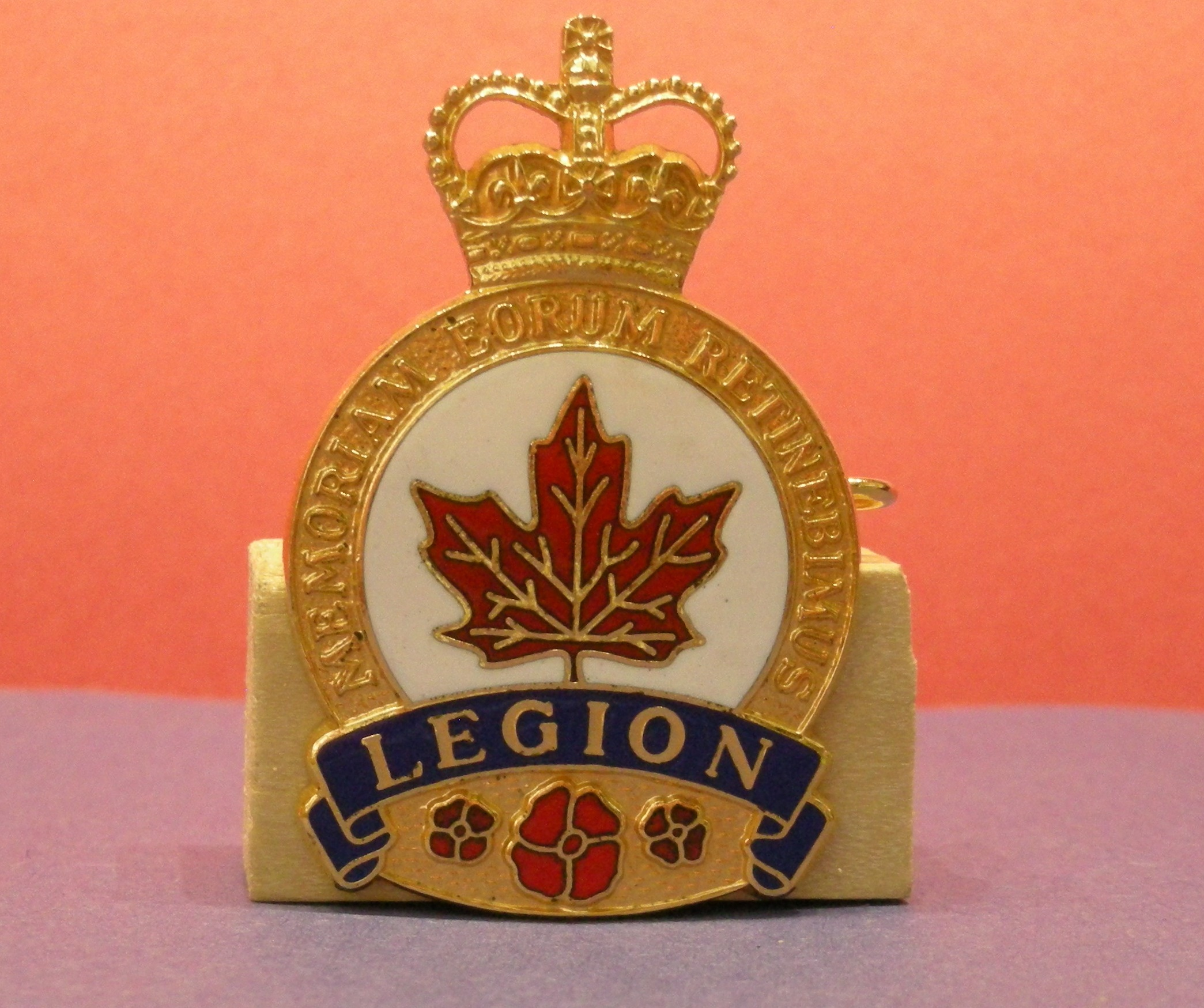
Royal Canadian Legion badge

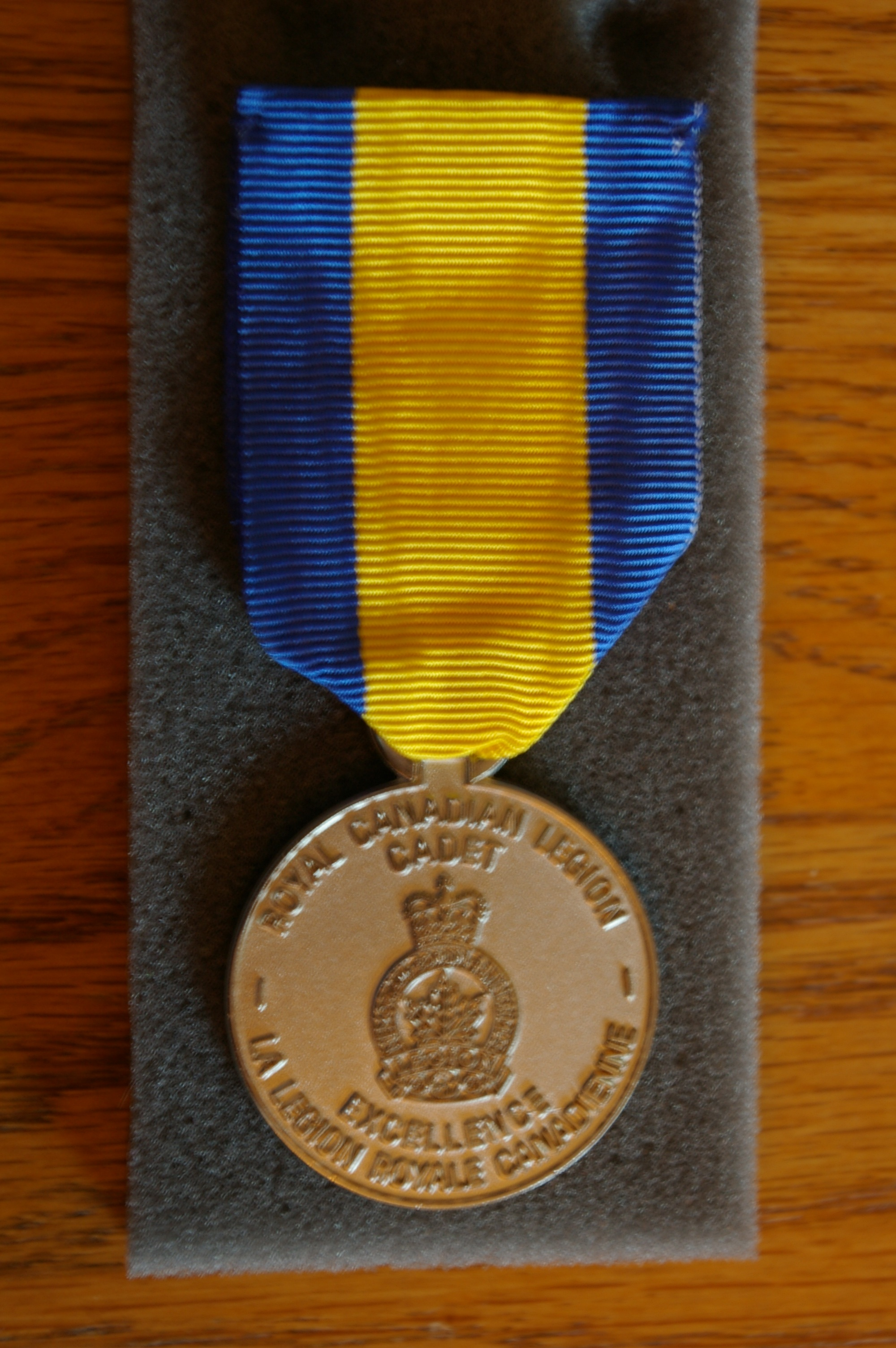
Royal Canadian Legion Cadet Medal of Excellence

The Royal Canadian Legion (French: Légion royale canadienne) is a non-profit Canadian veterans' organization founded in 1925. Members include people who served in the military, Royal Canadian Mounted Police, provincial or municipal police, Royal Canadian Air, Army and Sea Cadets, direct relatives of service members, and members of the general public.

== History ==
In Canada, several veterans' organizations emerged after the First World War. The Great War Veterans Association was the largest of 15. Field Marshal Douglas Haig, 1st Earl Haig, founder of the British Empire Service League (now known as the Royal Commonwealth Ex-Services League), visited Canada in 1925 and urged them to merge. That year, the Dominion Veterans Alliance served this purpose.

In November 1925, the Canadian Legion was founded in Winnipeg, Manitoba, as the Canadian Legion of the British Empire Services League, incorporated on July 17, 1926, by a special Act of Parliament. It grew steadily through the 1930s, then expanded rapidly following the Second World War. In 1960, Queen Elizabeth II granted it royal patronage and so it became the Royal Canadian Legion.

== Recognition ==
On 10 November 1975, Canada Post issued "The Royal Canadian Legion, 1925–1975" designed by Rudy Kovach. The 8¢ stamps are perforated 13 and were printed by British American Bank Note Company.

== National Headquarters ==
The National Headquarters of The Royal Canadian Legion in Ottawa, Ontario, feature a Wall of Remembrance, adorned by a three-metre long stainless steel sword (2006) by André Gauthier, who also provided a small work of art on the theme of the Tomb of the Unknown Soldier (2001) and “Of Such as These” (2003), a small bas-relief of Canadian World War II soldiers, presented by the Conference of Defence Associations Institute to Legion's National Secretariat.

== Memorials ==
The Royal Canadian Legion Branch 593 erected a memorial in Ottawa dedicated to those who died in the First and Second World Wars and the Korean War.

== Museums ==
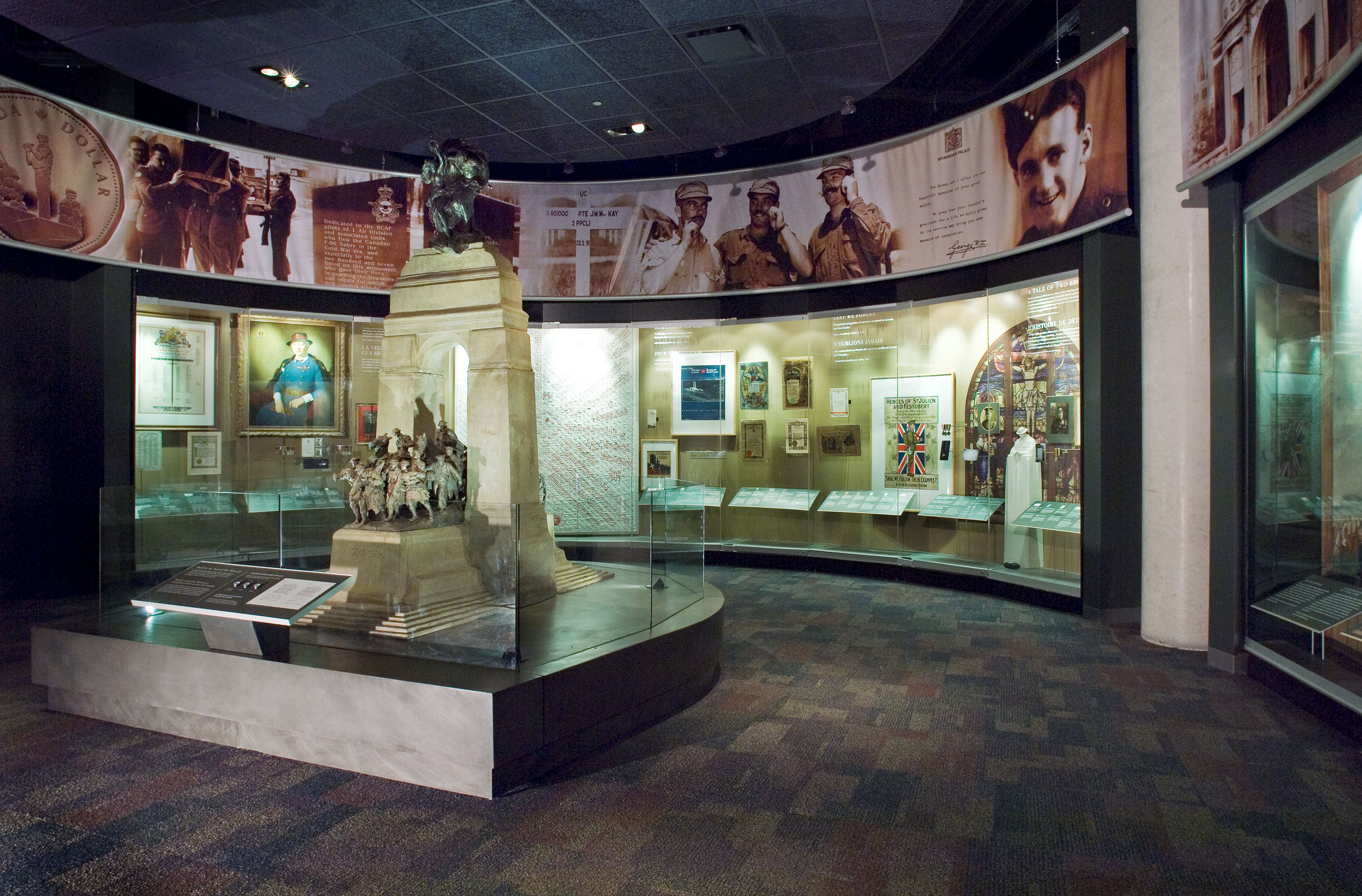
Royal Canadian Legion Hall of Honour at the Canadian War Museum, containing the original plaster model for the National War Memorial by sculptor Vernon March

A number of military museums are co-located and affiliated with Royal Canadian Legions.

Name	Town/city/region	Province	Type	Summary
Herman J. Good V.C Branch No.18 Royal Canadian Legion War Museum	Bathurst Gloucester	New Brunswick	Military	
Royal Canadian Legion Military Museum	Grand Falls-Windsor	Newfoundland and Labrador	Military	Operated by the Royal Canadian Legion Branch 12
Royal Canadian Legion Military Museum	Dartmouth Halifax Regional Municipality Metro Halifax	Nova Scotia	Military	
Hall of Remembrance Military Museum	Perth Eastern	Ontario	Military	
Royal Canadian Legion Branch 72 Museum	Pembroke Eastern	Ontario	Military	Open by request and for special events, local branch of the Royal Canadian Legion
Kensington Veterans Memorial Museum	Kensington Prince	Prince Edward Island	Military	Adjacent to the Royal Canadian Legion, includes uniforms, medals, hand weapons, flags, photographs and maps
Royal Canadian Legion Museum	Saskatoon West Central	Saskatchewan	Military	Uniforms, medals and memorabilia of the Royal Canadian Legion
Royal Canadian Legion Branch 80 Museum (Ken Snider Memorial Museum)	Midland Central	Ontario	Military	Open by request and for special events, local branch of the Royal Canadian Legion
St. Croix Military Museum	St. Stephen	New Brunswick	Military	Operated by the St. Croix Br. 9 Royal Canadian Legion

== Halls ==
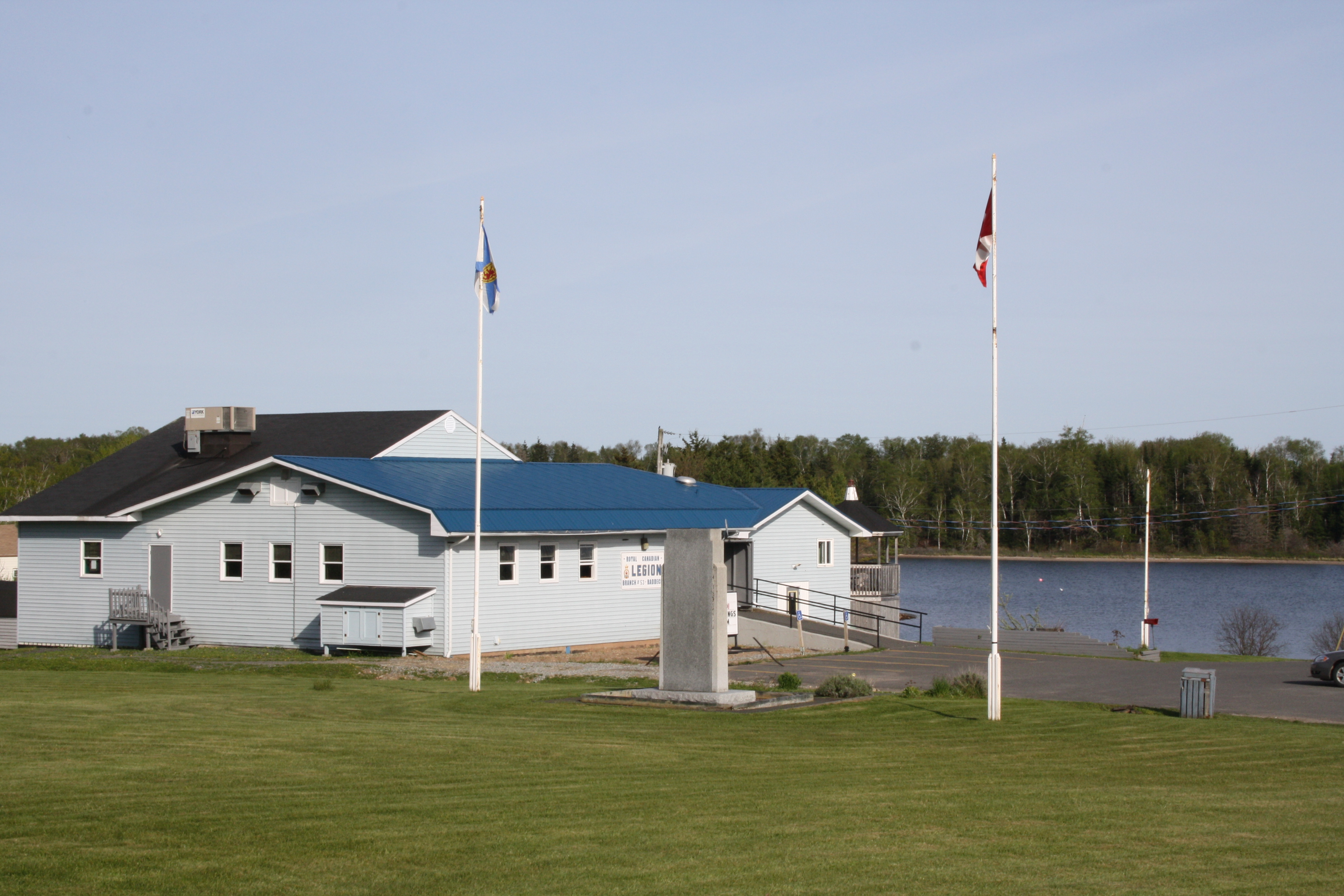
A Legion hall in Baddeck, Nova Scotia.

Most small towns and villages in Canada have at least one Legion Hall. Often the Legion Hall is a major community centre, combining the functions of a pub, pool hall, dance hall, bingo hall, banquet hall, and so on.

Legion Halls are numbered; for example, "Branch 99 Royal Canadian Legion". This is not a nationwide numbering system; instead, each provincial Command has its own numerical sequence. "Branch 99", therefore, can refer to any of several Legion Halls, as follows: Belleville, Ontario; Cowansville, Quebec; Lipton/Dysart, Saskatchewan; Coronation, Alberta (a branch that has closed); Sicamous, British Columbia; or Emo, Ontario (in the Manitoba/Northwestern Ontario Command).

The Royal Canadian Legion Maple Leaf Post-84 is located in Royal Oak, Michigan.

== Services and activities ==
=== Poppy campaign ===
The poppy is a powerful symbol associated in Canada with loss, sacrifice and remembrance. With the formation of the Legion in 1925 the poppy was adopted as a national symbol of remembrance. In 1948, the Government of Canada awarded the poppy's trademark to the Royal Canadian Legion to protect the image from misuse. This still restricts its usage in Canada to remembrance under the authority of the Royal Canadian Legion.

The Legion is responsible for Canada's remembrance poppy campaign which distributes plastic lapel poppies to be worn in the lead up to Remembrance Day. The poppy is worn on the left lapel, or as close to the heart as possible. The current lapel poppy has been manufactured since 1922—originally under the sponsorship of the Department of Soldiers Civil Re-establishment. Until 1996, the poppy material was manufactured at sheltered workshops operated by Veterans Affairs Canada. Poppies are distributed through retail outlets, workplaces, Legion branches, malls and other locations across Canada. Typically, the poppies are offered up for donation as a symbol of remembrance, using an honour system, with the poppies being left in open places with a receptacle for leaving a donation toward the campaign. Funds raised are used to support ex-service members in need, and to fund medical appliances and research, home services, care facilities and numerous other purposes benefiting veterans.

=== Athletic camp ===
In 1962, the Legion began a summer sports camp at the International Peace Garden; the camp ran until 2019. More than 60,000 school age athletes availed of the camp. Several sports were offered over a five-week period. The program was founded by George H. Phillips and Fred Taylor.

=== Bands ===
There are many privately run Legion bands across the country, acting independently and in the community in which they are based. They are attached to different legion branches and include full concert show bands, and marching bands. The Royal Canadian Legion Concert Band in Toronto has been active for over a century and is one of the oldest legion bands in the country. Many legion bands were led by former bandsmen, most notably James Gayfer, director of the Band of the Canadian Guards from 1953 to 1961, who founded the Petawawa Legion Community Band in 1978. In May 1978, legion bands congregated at the Olympic Stadium in Montreal for the Legion Day celebrations, becoming one of the largest legion combined activities recorded.

=== Lest We Forget Project ===
The Legion supports the Lest We Forget Project in cooperation with the Canadian War Museum.

=== Military skills conversion ===
In 2015, the Royal Canadian Legion donated $830,000 to the BCIT School of Business to fund the Legion Military Skills Conversion Program. This program helps Canadian veterans and reservists convert their military skills and knowledge into a business credential.

=== Veterans Review and Appeal Board ===
The Royal Canadian Legion provides assistance to veterans and eligible family members before the Veterans Review and Appeal Board. The RCL and the Bureau of Pensions Advocates often work together to prepare cases and represent veteran clients before the board when those clients wish to appeal disability pension and award decisions made by Veterans Affairs Canada.

== Membership ==
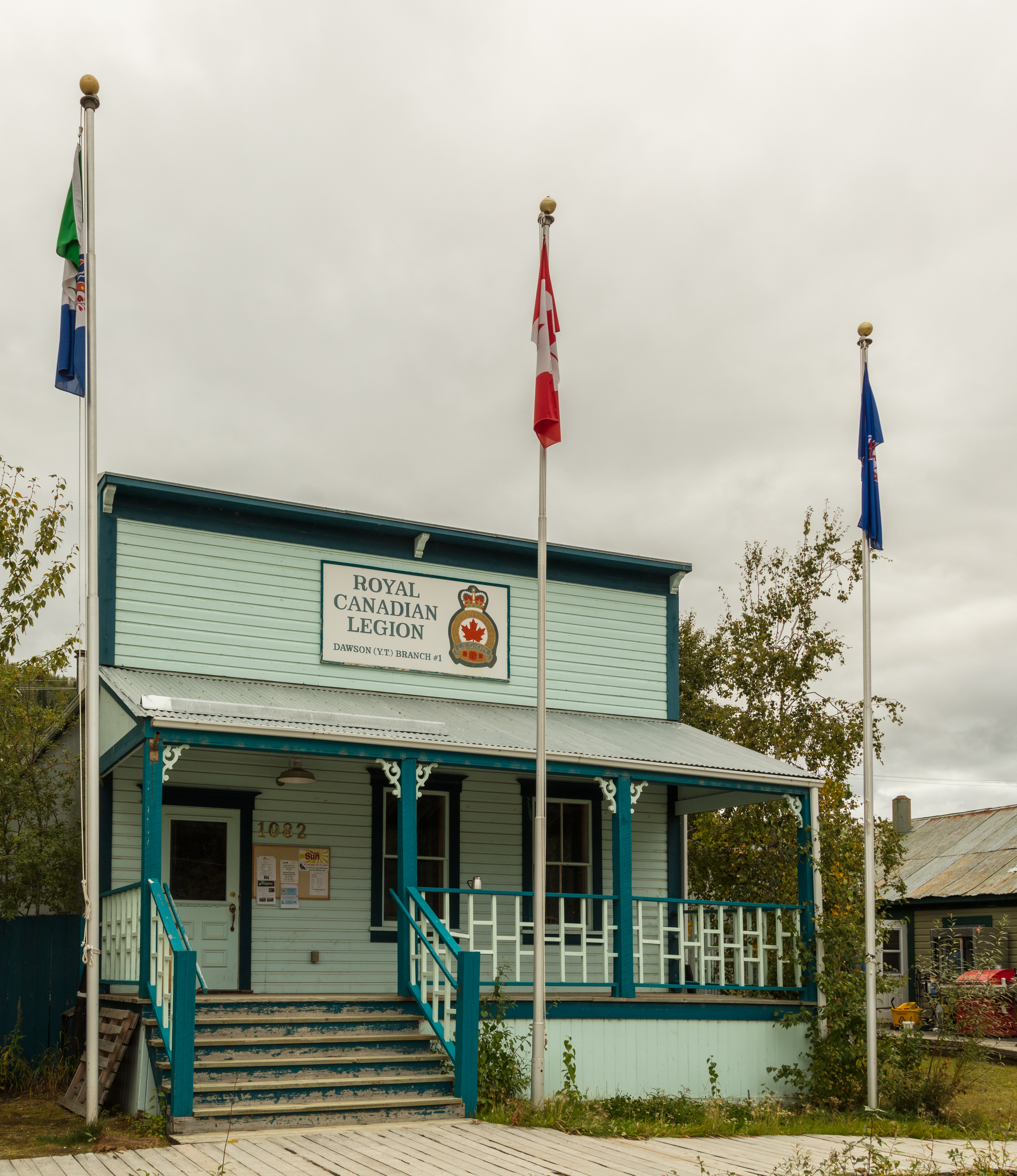
Branch of the Royal Canadian Legion in Dawson City, Yukon.

Membership in The Royal Canadian Legion was originally restricted to ex-service members of Canada's Armed Forces and Merchant Navy. The organization is now open to members of the general public.There are four categories of membership.

=== Ordinary ===
Ordinary membership is open to anyone who has served or is serving in one of the following:

- The Canadian Forces or His Majesty's Forces (including regular force or reserve force under class "C" service, CIC, or other reserve).
- Forces or underground forces of any of His Majesty's allies in any war, conflict or police action in which Canada was involved.
- The Merchant Navy or non-military services in an actual theatre of war in which Canada was involved.
- His Majesty's reserve forces including Cadet Instructors on the Cadet Cadre for not less than one year.
- The Royal Canadian Mounted Police or The Royal Newfoundland Constabulary for not less than one year.
- The forces of a country while that country was a member of NATO or NORAD in alliance with Canada.
- The forces of the United States.
- The Vietnam War with the Armed Forces of the United States, Australia, New Zealand, the Republic of Korea or South Vietnam, and were a Canadian citizen or Commonwealth subject at the time of service.
- The Canadian Coast Guard as an officer or crew member who has two or more years active service on the high seas or inland waterways.
- A city, municipal or provincial police force as a police officer for not less than one year.

=== Associate ===
Individuals who do not qualify for ordinary membership can be associate members if one of the following applies:

- The Royal Canadian Air, Army or Sea cadets for no less than 3 years of the joined date. (Cadet graduates may also be eligible for their first year free.)
- They are the child, stepchild, adopted child, grandchild, sibling, niece/nephew, widow/widower, parent or spouse of someone who is or was eligible for ordinary membership.
- They are the child of an associate member.
- They have served as a cadet civilian instructor for not less than 3 years.
- They have served as an officer in the Navy League of Canada for not less than 2 years.
- They have served in the Polish Armed Forces after World War II below the rank of officer.
- They have served in a City, Municipal, Volunteer, Un-organized Territories or Federal Fire Service for not less than one year.
- They are the spouse, parent or sibling of an associate member who qualified subject to the above criteria.

=== Affiliate ===
Commonwealth subjects who do not qualify for ordinary or associate membership are eligible for affiliate membership.

Non-Commonwealth subjects from an Allied nation who support the aims and objects of The Royal Canadian Legion can apply for affiliate non-voting membership.

== Archives ==
There is a Royal Canadian Legion fond at Library and Archives Canada. The archival reference number is R2966, former archival reference number MG28-I298. The fond covers the date range 1897 to 1987. It consists of:

- 14.91 meters of textual records.
- c. 832 audio cassettes (c. 617 h, 30 min).
- 4 audio reels (c. 3 h, 30 min).
- 10 videocassettes (12 h, 35 min, 30 s).
- 310 photographs.
- 10 badges.
- 6 pins.
- 4 medals.
- 1 ribbon.
- 1 drawing.
- 45 microfiche.
- 49 microfilm reels.

== Freedoms ==
The Royal Canadian Legion has received the freedom of several cities. These include, chronologically:

- (British Columbia) 18 November 1986: Kamloops (Branch 52).
- (British Columbia) 16 October 2005: Port Moody (Port Moody Branch 119).
- (British Columbia) 1 July 2016: Courtenay (Courtenay Branch 17).
- (Alberta) 1 July 2016: Bonnyville (Bonnyville Branch 183).
- (British Columbia) 22 June 2019: Armstrong (Armstrong Branch 35).
- (British Columbia) 19 September 2026: Parksville (Mount Arrowsmith Branch 49).
- (British Columbia) Unknown: Maple Ridge (Maple Ridge Branch 88).

== See also ==
- American Legion
- Remembrance Day
- South African Legion
- The Royal British Legion
