= Daniel J. MacDonald =

Canadian politician

The Honourable Daniel J. MacDonald PC

Minister of Veterans Affairs
- In office 3 March 1980 – 30 September 1980
- Prime Minister: Pierre Trudeau
- Preceded by: Allan McKinnon
- Succeeded by: Gilles Lamontagne (acting)
- In office 21 November 1972 – 3 June 1979
- Prime Minister: Pierre Trudeau
- Preceded by: Arthur Laing
- Succeeded by: Allan McKinnon

Member of Parliament for Cardigan
- In office 18 February 1980 – 30 September 1980
- Preceded by: Wilbur MacDonald
- Succeeded by: W. Bennett Campbell
- In office 30 October 1972 – 21 May 1979
- Preceded by: Melvin McQuaid
- Succeeded by: Wilbur MacDonald

MLA (Councillor) for 1st Kings
- In office 10 December 1962 – 1972
- Preceded by: Melvin McQuaid
- Succeeded by: Melvin McQuaid

Personal details
- Born: Daniel Joseph MacDonald; 23 July 1918 Bothwell, Prince Edward Island, Canada
- Died: 30 September 1980 (aged 62)
- Party: Liberal
- Spouse: Pauline Peters
- Children: 7

Daniel Joseph MacDonald PC (23 July 1918 – 30 September 1980) was a Canadian politician from Prince Edward Island. He served as Minister of Veterans Affairs from 1972 to 1979 and again in 1980 until his death.

== Life ==
He was born on his family's farm in Bothwell, Prince Edward Island, and was educated in a one-room schoolhouse.

At the age of 20, he bought his own farm at Bothwell Beach. In 1940, he enlisted in The Prince Edward Island Highlanders to fight in World War II. He was transferred to the Cape Breton Highlanders in 1943 and fought with the rank of sergeant in Italy, where he was wounded during the assault on the Gothic Line. He returned to his unit after a few weeks and was seriously wounded on 21 December 1944, during the Battle of Senio River. As a result, his left arm and leg were amputated. Undiscouraged by his injuries, he returned to his farm, married a local woman named Pauline Peters, built a house, and raised seven children: Blair, Heather, Gail, Daniel, Leo, Walter, and Gloria. The singer-songwriter Jenn Grant is a granddaughter.

== Political career ==
In 1962, he was elected to the Prince Edward Island House of Assembly and sat in the body for ten years. He served as Minister of Agriculture and Forestry from 1966 to 1972, when he resigned to run in the 1972 federal election. Elected as the Liberal Member of Parliament for Cardigan, he was appointed to the Cabinet of Pierre Trudeau as Minister of Veterans Affairs. He was defeated in the 1979 federal election but returned in the 1980 election and was then reappointed to the Veterans Affairs portfolio. MacDonald reformed veterans' pensions to make them more generous and introduced disability pensions and pensions for prisoners of war.

In the late 1970s, Prime Minister Pierre Elliott Trudeau undertook an initiative to decentralize government away from Ottawa. He and MacDonald devised the plan to move the headquarters of the Department of Veterans Affairs from Ottawa to Charlottetown, Prince Edward Island. The department's head office, along with the Veterans Review and Appeal Board, have been located in the Daniel J. MacDonald Building (the "DJM") in PEI's capital ever since. (In the early 21st century, a second building two blocks from the DJM, the Jean Canfield Building (the "JCB"), was constructed to house other federal government offices, including some from Veterans Affairs Canada.) The department has become a major economic contributor to PEI, and has had an important impact on Charlottetown's cultural landscape.

MacDonald died in office on 30 September 1980, and was given a state funeral. The eulogy was given by Prime Minister Trudeau at St. Dunstan's Cathedral, in Charlottetown.

== Electoral history ==
1980 Canadian federal election: Cardigan
Party	Candidate	Votes	%	±%
Liberal	Daniel J. MacDonald	8,590	48.18	+1.51
Progressive Conservative	Wilbur MacDonald	8,006	44.90	-3.21
New Democratic	Aubrey Cantelo	1,054	5.91	+0.69
Independent	Arthur D. Reddin	180	1.01	
Total valid votes		17,830	100.00	

1979 Canadian federal election: Cardigan
Party	Candidate	Votes	%	±%
Progressive Conservative	Wilbur MacDonald	8,219	48.11	+5.98
Liberal	Daniel J. MacDonald	7,972	46.67	-7.32
New Democratic	George MacFarlane	892	5.22	+1.94
Total valid votes		17,083	100.00	

1974 Canadian federal election: Cardigan
Party	Candidate	Votes	%	±%
Liberal	Daniel J. MacDonald	6,958	53.99	+9.45
Progressive Conservative	Leo James Walsh	5,429	42.13	+0.95
New Democratic	Martin Gerard Kenny	423	3.28	-10.99
Independent	A. Neil Harpham	77	0.60	
Total valid votes		12,887	100.00	

1972 Canadian federal election: Cardigan
Party	Candidate	Votes	%	±%
Liberal	Daniel J. MacDonald	5,528	44.54	-4.21
Progressive Conservative	Alfred Kenneth Fraser	5,111	41.18	-8.35
New Democratic	Aquinas Ryan	1,771	14.27	+12.51
Total valid votes		12,410	100.00	

20th Canadian Ministry (1968–1979) – First cabinet of Pierre Trudeau
Cabinet post (1)
Predecessor	Office	Successor
Arthur Laing	Minister of Veterans Affairs; 1972–1979	Allan McKinnon
22nd Canadian Ministry (1980–1984) – Second cabinet of Pierre Trudeau
Cabinet post (1)
Predecessor	Office	Successor
Allan McKinnon	Minister of Veterans Affairs; 1980	Gilles Lamontagne
Other offices
Preceded by Melvin McQuaid, Progressive Conservative	Councillor for 1st Kings; 1962–1972	Succeeded by Melvin McQuaid, Progressive Conservative
