= HMCS Saguenay =

Several Canadian naval units have been named HMCS Saguenay.

- HMCS Saguenay (D79) was a Second World War A-class destroyer customized for Canadian service in the North Atlantic.
- HMCS Saguenay (DDH 206) was a Cold War era St. Laurent-class destroyer escort

== Battle honours ==
- Atlantic 1939–42
