= Veterans Review and Appeal Board =

Agency overview
- Formed: 1995
- (etc.)
- Jurisdiction: Government of Canada
- Headquarters: Charlottetown, Prince Edward Island, Canada; 46°14′8.03″N 63°7′35″W
- Minister responsible: Lawrence MacAulay, Minister of Veterans Affairs
- Agency executives: Chris McNeil, Chairperson; Jacques Bouchard, Deputy Chairperson
- Parent agency: Independent agency that reports to Parliament through the Minister of Veterans Affairs
- Website: http://www.vrab-tacra.gc.ca

The Veterans Review and Appeal Board (VRAB; French: Tribunal des anciens combattants (révision et appel)) is a government of Canada agency responsible for hearing reviews and appeals by ill and injured members and veterans of the Canadian Armed Forces and Royal Canadian Mounted Police in relation to disability pension and award decisions by Veterans Affairs Canada. Although the Board reports to Parliament through the Minister of Veterans Affairs, the Board is an independent agency. It was created in 1995 and is governed by the Veterans Review and Appeal Board Act and the Veterans Review and Appeal Board Regulations. The Board is headed by a chair and a deputy chair, who are selected from a permanent board of 25 members and as many temporary members as deemed necessary. The head office is located in the Sherwood Business Centre, Charlottetown, Prince Edward Island.

The vast majority of individuals appealing their cases to the Veterans Review and Appeal Board are represented free of charge by lawyers of Veterans Affairs Canada's semi-independent Bureau of Pensions Advocates.

== List of chairs of the Veterans Review and Appeal Board and its predecessor organizations ==
- Richard Thibault (Acting Chair 2026–; Veterans Review and Appeal Board)
- Chris McNeil (2018–2026; Veterans Review and Appeal Board)
- Thomas Jarmyn (2017–2018; Veterans Review and Appeal Board)
- Thomas Jarmyn (Acting Chair 2015–2017; Veterans Review and Appeal Board)
- John D. Larlee, Q.C. (2009–2015; Veterans Review and Appeal Board)
- James MacPhee (Acting Chair Dec 2008–April 2009; Veterans Review and Appeal Board)
- Victor Marchand (2003–2008; Veterans Review and Appeal Board)
- Victor Marchand (Acting Chair 2003; Veterans Review and Appeal Board)
- Brian Chambers (1995–2003; Veterans Review and Appeal Board)
- Twila M. Whalen (1991–1995; Veterans Appeal Board)
- Norman A. Pinlott (1989–1991; Veterans Appeal Board)
- Just P. Letellier, C.D. (1987–1989; Veterans Appeal Board)
- Just P. Letellier, C.D. (1985–1987; Pension Review Board)
- Frank Oatley Plant, Q.C. (1982–1985; Pension Review Board)
- René N. Jutras (1971–1982; Pension Review Board)
