= Bennett Campbell =

Canadian politician (1943–2008)

The Honourable Bennett Campbell PC

24th Premier of Prince Edward Island
- In office September 18, 1978 – May 3, 1979
- Monarch: Elizabeth II
- Lieutenant Governor: Gordon L. Bennett
- Preceded by: Alexander B. Campbell
- Succeeded by: J. Angus MacLean

Member of Parliament for Cardigan
- In office April 13, 1981 – September 4, 1984
- Preceded by: Daniel J. MacDonald
- Succeeded by: Pat Binns

Leader of the Prince Edward Island Liberal Party
- In office December 9, 1978 – April 13, 1981; Interim: September 18 – December 9, 1978
- Preceded by: Alexander B. Campbell
- Succeeded by: Gilbert Clements (interim)

MLA (Assemblyman) for 3rd Kings
- In office May 11, 1970 – April 13, 1981
- Preceded by: Thomas A. Curran
- Succeeded by: Joey Fraser

Personal details
- Born: August 27, 1943 Montague, Prince Edward Island
- Died: September 11, 2008 (aged 65) Cardigan, Prince Edward Island
- Party: Prince Edward Island Liberal Party
- Other political affiliations: Liberal
- Spouse: Margaret Shirley Chiasson (m. 1970)
- Children: 8
- Education: St. Dunstan's University
- Occupation: Teacher and Civil servant
- Profession: Politician
- Cabinet: Provincial: Minister of Education (1972–1978); Provincial Secretary (1974–1976); Minister of Finance (1976–1978) Federal: Minister of Veterans Affairs (1981–1984)

William Bennett Campbell PC (August 27, 1943 – September 11, 2008) was a Canadian politician who was the 24th premier of Prince Edward Island.

== Biography ==
Born in Montague, Prince Edward Island, Campbell was a teacher by profession before entering politics in 1970 and was elected to the Legislative Assembly of Prince Edward Island as a Liberal candidate. In 1972, he became Minister of Education; Provincial Secretary in 1974; and Minister of Finance in 1976.

When Liberal leader and PEI Premier Alexander B. Campbell (no relation) announced his retirement, Bennett Campbell was elected interim leader of the PEI Liberal Party by the caucus and was sworn in as premier on September 18, 1978. On December 9, he was elected leader at the party's leadership convention.

His government was defeated in the general election held the next year. He remained party leader and leader of the opposition until he decided to enter federal politics. He won the seat for Cardigan in the House of Commons of Canada through a 1981 by-election following the death of Daniel J. MacDonald. On September 22, 1981, he took over Macdonald's cabinet portfolio and became Minister of Veterans Affairs in the government of Prime Minister Pierre Trudeau. He retained his portfolio when John Turner succeeded Trudeau as Liberal leader and prime minister, but lost his seat to Pat Binns in the 1984 election that brought down the short-lived Turner government.

In the 1986 provincial election, Campbell attempted to regain his former district of 3rd Kings, but lost to Progressive Conservative incumbent Joey Fraser by 16 votes.

On September 11, 2008, Campbell died of cancer.

== Electoral record ==
Canadian federal by-election, 13 April 1981 On the death of Daniel J. MacDonald, 30 September 1980
Party	Candidate	Votes	%	±%
Liberal	Bennett Campbell	8,166	49.04	+0.86
Progressive Conservative	Wilbur MacDonald	7,813	46.92	+2.02
New Democratic	Aubrey Cantello	674	4.05	-1.86
Total valid votes		16,653	100.00	

1984 Canadian federal election: Cardigan
Party	Candidate	Votes	%	±%
Progressive Conservative	Pat Binns	10,566	53.36	+6.44
Liberal	Bennett Campbell	8,344	42.14	-6.90
New Democratic	Lorne Cudmore	891	4.50	+0.45
Total valid votes		19,801	100.00	
