= Jill McKnight =

Canadian politician

The Honourable Jill McKnight PC MP

Minister of Veterans Affairs
- Incumbent
- Assumed office May 13, 2025
- Prime Minister: Mark Carney
- Preceded by: Élisabeth Brière

Associate Minister of National Defence
- Incumbent
- Assumed office May 13, 2025
- Prime Minister: Mark Carney
- Preceded by: Darren Fisher

Member of Parliament for Delta
- Incumbent
- Assumed office April 28, 2025
- Preceded by: Carla Qualtrough

Personal details
- Born: Delta, British Columbia, Canada
- Party: Liberal
- Spouse: Stephen Smith
- Education: University of Victoria
- Profession: Executive director, Business owner, politician
- Website: jillmcknight.liberal.ca

Jill McKnight is a Canadian politician who has been Minister of Veterans Affairs and Associate Minister of National Defence since 2025. A member of the Liberal Party, McKnight was elected as the member of Parliament (MP) for Delta in the 2025 Canadian federal election.

== Early life ==
Jill McKnight was born and raised in Delta, British Columbia, by her parents, Tracey and Bill McKnight. She graduated from South Delta Secondary School and later earned a Bachelor of Commerce in Entrepreneurial Business from the University of Victoria.

McKnight is married to her husband Stephen Smith and they live in Ladner.

== Career ==
McKnight has been involved in family businesses in Delta. For 28 years, she and her family operated South Coast Casuals in Ladner, a ladies clothing boutique. She was also involved with the Ladner Village Market for more than 20 years, bringing together the local producers and makers with customers from all over the Lower Mainland and B.C.

Prior to entering federal politics, McKnight was the Executive Director of the Delta Chamber of Commerce. She was appointed to this role following her years of volunteering with the Ladner Business Association, including five years as the President.

In addition to her business work, McKnight has been part of several community initiatives. Her fundraising activities have helped raise over $250K for various community causes, including the Ladner Business Association, the Delta Hospital Foundation, the BC Cancer Foundation, and Dress for Success.

== Political career ==
On May 13, 2025, McKnight was named Minister of Veteran Affairs and Associate Minister of National Defence in the 30th Canadian Ministry, headed by Mark Carney. In January 2026, almost half of members of the Women Veterans Council, created to implement the results of the 2024 'Invisible No More' report, resigned, citing a lack of "institutional conditions needed to enable meaningful, impactful work."

== Awards ==
- Delta Volunteer of the Year: Delta Chamber 2019
- Queen's Jubilee Award: Exemplary Community Service 2022
- King Charles III Coronation Medal: Community Leadership 2024

== Electoral record ==
2025 Canadian federal election: Delta
Party	Candidate	Votes	%	±%	Expenditures
Liberal	Jill McKnight	32,802	51.83	+9.28	$118,216.69
Conservative	Jessy Sahota	27,314	43.15	+9.62	$123,210.05
New Democratic	Jason McCormick	2,787	4.40	–14.04	$2,265.82
People's	Natasa Sirotic	390	0.62	–1.86	$4,848.00
Total valid votes/expense limit		63,293	99.46	–	$130,926.91
Total rejected ballots		344	0.54	–0.03	
Turnout		63,637	74.12	+6.58	
Eligible voters		85,862			
Liberal notional hold		Swing		–0.17	
Source: Elections Canada

Order of precedence
Preceded by Heath MacDonald as Member of the Cabinet	Order of Precedence of Canada as Member of the Cabinet	Succeeded by Marjorie Michel as Member of the Cabinet
