= HMCS Saguenay (DDH 206) =

Former destroyer of the Royal Canadian Navy

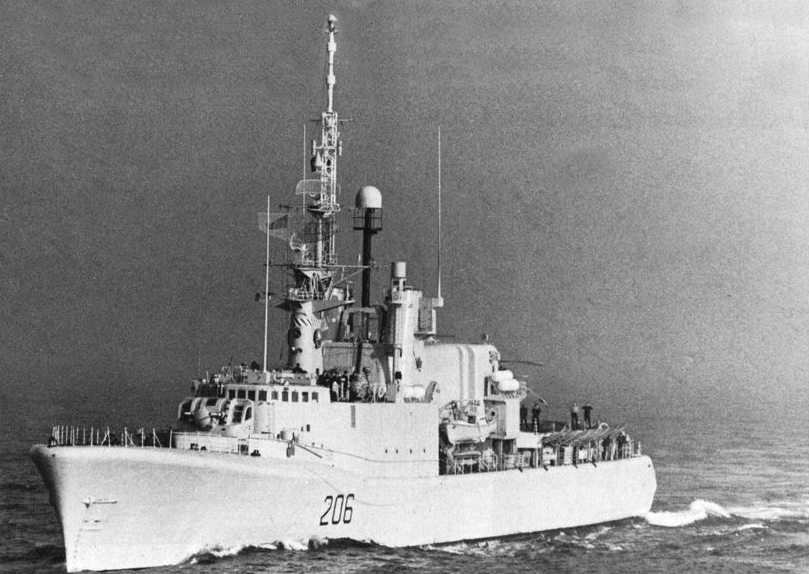
- HMCS Saguenay underway in 1981

History

Canada
- Name: Saguenay
- Namesake: Saguenay River
- Builder: Halifax Shipyards Ltd., Halifax
- Laid down: 4 April 1951
- Launched: 30 July 1953
- Commissioned: 15 December 1956
- Decommissioned: 26 June 1990
- Reclassified: 14 May 1965 (as DDH)
- Identification: Pennant number: 206
- Motto: A 1'erte (Ready to act)
- Honours and awards: Atlantic 1939–42
- Fate: Sold in 1990 and scuttled as an artificial reef off Lunenburg, Nova Scotia in 1994.
- Badge: Sable, a bend wavy argent charged with two like cotises azure, surmounted by an Indian's head facing sinister and couped at the shoulder proper having a fillet gules about the temples, depending there from, tips downward, four feathers of the second pied of the last, and pendant from the ear an annulet silver.

General characteristics
- Type: St. Laurent-class destroyer escort
- Displacement: As DDE: 2263 tons (normal), 2800 tons (deep load); As DDH: 2260 tons (normal), 3051 tons (deep load)
- Length: 366 ft (111.6 m)
- Beam: 42 ft (12.8 m)
- Draught: As DDE: 13 ft (4.0 m); As DDH:14 ft (4.3 m)
- Propulsion: 2-shaft English-Electric geared steam turbines, 3 Babcock & Wilcox boilers 22,000 kW (30,000 shp)
- Speed: 28.5 knots (52.8 km/h)
- Range: 4,570 nautical miles (8,463.6 km) at 12 knots (22.2 km/h)
- Complement: As DDE: 249; As DDH: 213 plus 20 aircrew
- Sensors & processing systems: As DDE: 1 × SPS-12 air search radar; 1 × SPS-10B surface search radar; 1 × Sperry Mk.2 navigation radar; 1 × SQS-10 or −11 hull mounted active search and attack sonar; 1 × SQS-501 (Type 162) high frequency bottom profiling sonar; 1 × SQS-502 (Type 170) high frequency Limbo mortar control sonar; 1 × UQC-1B "Gertrude" underwater telephone; 1 × GUNAR (Mk.64 GFCS with 2 on-mount SPG-48 directors); As DDH: 1 × SPS-12 air search radar; 1 × SPS-10B surface search radar; 1 × Sperry Mk.2 navigation radar; 1 × URN 20 TACAN radar; 1 × SQS-10 or −11 hull mounted active search and attack sonar; 1 × SQS-501 (Type 162) high frequency bottom profiling sonar; 1 × SQS-502 (Type 170) high frequency Limbo mortar control sonar; 1 × SQS-504 VDS, medium frequency active search (except 233 after 1986); 1 × UQC-1B "Gertrude" underwater telephone; 1 × GUNAR (Mk.64 GFCS with 1 on-mount SPG-48 director)
- Electronic warfare & decoys: As DDE: 1 × DAU HF/DF (high frequency direction finder); As DDH: 1 × WLR 1C radar warning; 1 × UPD 501 radar detection; 1 × SRD 501 HF/DF
- Armament: As DDE: 2 × 3 in (76 mm) Mk.33 FMC twin mounts guns; 2 × 40 mm "Boffin" single mount guns; 2 × Mk NC 10 Limbo ASW mortars; 2 × single Mk.2 "K-gun" launchers with homing torpedoes; As DDH: 1 × 3"/50 Mk.33 FMC twin mount gun; 1 × Mk NC 10 Limbo ASW mortar; 2 × triple Mk.32 12.75 inch launchers firing Mk.44 or Mk.46 Mod 5 torpedoes
- Aircraft carried: As DDH: 1 × CH-124 Sea King
- Aviation facilities: As DDH: 1 × midships helicopter deck with Beartrap and hangar

HMCS Saguenay was a St. Laurent-class destroyer that served in the Royal Canadian Navy and later the Canadian Forces from 1956–1990. She was the second vessel in her class and the second Canadian naval unit to carry the name HMCS Saguenay. After being discarded by the Canadian Forces, the ship was sunk as an artificial reef off the coast of Nova Scotia.

== Design and description ==
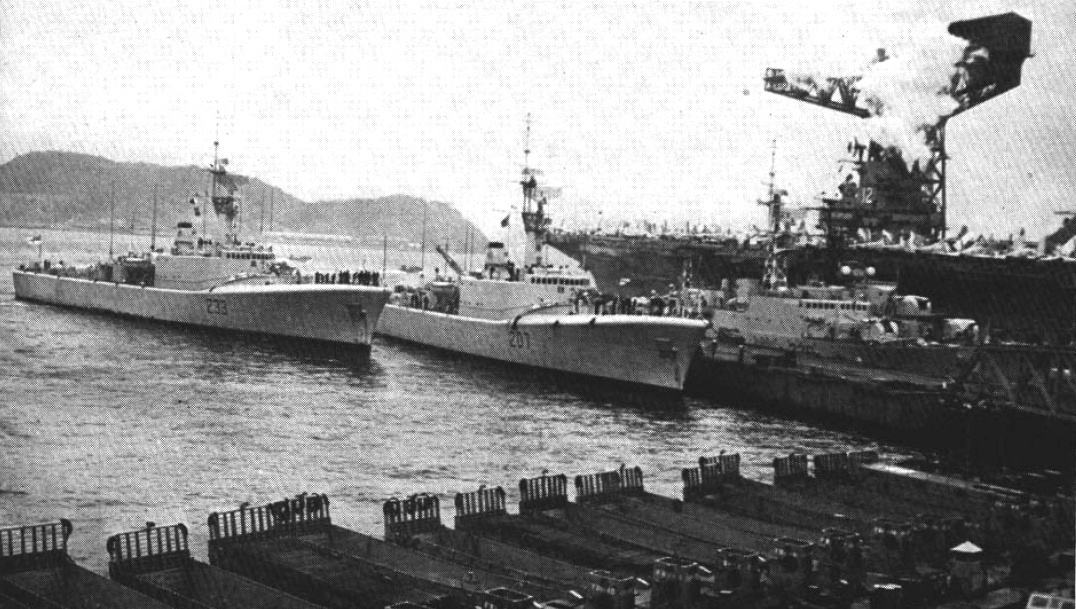
Two St. Laurent-class destroyers in their original configuration

The need for the St. Laurent class came about in 1949 when Canada joined NATO and the Cold War was in its infancy. The Royal Canadian Navy (RCN) was assigned responsibility for anti-submarine warfare (ASW) and controlling sea space in the western North Atlantic. The St Laurent class were built to an operational requirement much like that which produced the British Type 12, and were powered by the same machinery plant. The rounded deck-edge forward was adopted to prevent ice forming. The vessels were designed to operate in harsh Canadian conditions. They were built to counter nuclear, biological and chemical attack conditions, which led to a design with a rounded hull, a continuous main deck, and the addition of a pre-wetting system to wash away contaminants. The living spaces on the ship were part of a "citadel" which could be sealed off from contamination for the crew safety. The ships were sometimes referred to as "Cadillacs" for their relatively luxurious crew compartments; these were also the first Canadian warships to have a bunk for every crew member since previous warship designs had used hammocks.

As built, the ships were 366 feet (112 m) long overall with a beam of 42 feet (13 m) and a draught of 13 feet 2 inches (4.01 m). The destroyer escorts displaced 2,263 tonnes (2,227 long tons) standard and 2,800 tonnes (2,800 long tons) at deep load. (Note: Conway's says 2000 tons standard displacement, 2600 deep load.) The destroyer escorts had a crew of 12 officers and 237 enlisted.

=== Armament ===
The St. Laurent class was fitted with twin 3-inch (76 mm)/L50 caliber guns in two mounts for engaging both surface and air targets. The ships were also fitted with two single-mounted 40 mm (1.6 in) guns. The class's anti-submarine armament consisted of a pair of triple-barreled Mk. NC 10 Limbo ASW mortars in a stern well. The stern well had a roller top to close it off from following seas. As with the British Type 12 design, the provision for long-range homing torpedoes (in this case BIDDER [Mk 20E] or the US Mark 35 were included. However, they were never fitted.

=== Machinery ===
The vessels of the St. Laurent class had two Babcock & Wilcox water tube boilers installed. The steam produced by these boilers was directed at two geared steam turbines which powered two shafts, providing 22,000 kilowatts (30,000 shp) to drive the ship at a maximum speed of 28.5 knots (52.8 km/h). The ships had an endurance of 4,570 nautical miles (8,460 km) at 12 knots (22 km/h).

=== DDH conversion ===
Following successful trials aboard the frigate Buckingham and sister ship Ottawa, plans to convert the St. Laurent class took shape. Th development of the beartrap, installed in Assiniboine during her 1962–63 conversion, finalized the concept. By keeping the aircraft secure, the beartrap eliminated the need for deck handling from landing to the hangar, or from hangar to takeoff.

In the conversion to a helicopter-carrying vessel, Saguenay was gutted except for machinery and some forward spaces. The hull was strengthened, and fuelling facilities for the helicopter and active fin stabilizers were installed. The fin stabilizers were to reduce roll in rough weather during helicopter operations. All seven St Laurents were fitted with helicopter platforms and SQS 504 Variable Depth Sonar (VDS). The single funnel was altered to twin stepped funnels to permit the forward extension of the helicopter hangar. To make room for the helicopter deck, the aft 3-inch mount and one of the Limbos were removed. The two 40 mm guns were also removed. Following the conversion, the displacement remained the same at standard load but at full load, it increased to 3,051 tonnes (3,003 long tons).

=== DELEX program ===
In the late 1970s, under the Destroyer Life Extension (DELEX) program was commissioned to upgrade ten of the St. Laurent-class ships with new electronics, machinery, and hull upgrades and repairs. However, only enough was done to keep the ships in service into the late 1980s. For the St. Laurents, this meant hull and machinery repairs only.

== Service history ==
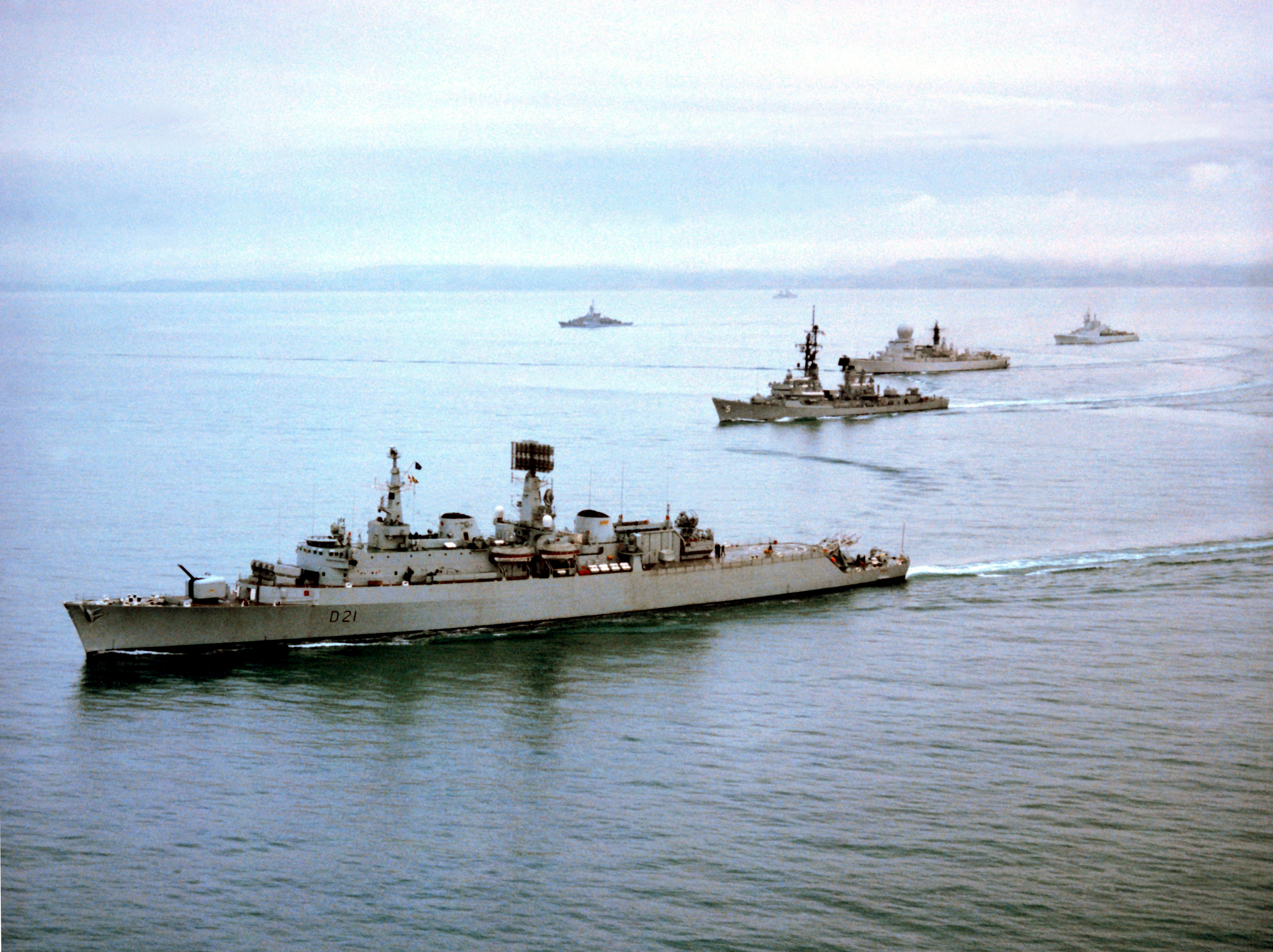
Saguenay (first from right) underway in a Standing Naval Force, Atlantic group in 1982.

Saguenay was laid down on 4 April 1951 by Halifax Shipyards Ltd. at Halifax, Nova Scotia and launched on 30 July 1953. The destroyer escort was commissioned into the Royal Canadian Navy on 15 December 1956 and assigned hull number DDE 206. After commissioning, Saguenay saw service on the east coast. In 1959, the vessel transferred to the west coast, joined the Second Canadian Escort Squadron. In February 1960, Saguenay, accompanied by Ottawa and St. Laurent, began a training tour of the Pacific, making several port visits. The three ships returned to Esquimalt, British Columbia in April. The following year, the three ships deployed with the United States Navy's Carrier Division 17 off the coast of Hawaii.

Saguenay underwent conversion from a destroyer escort (DDE) to a destroyer helicopter escort (DDH) at Burrard Dry Dock in Vancouver, British Columbia beginning 22 August 1963. Saguenay was officially reclassed and recommissioned on 14 May 1965. The ship was sent to Halifax to work with the east coast fleet, where she joined the First Canadian Destroyer Squadron. On 16 July 1970 the ship ran aground off the coast of Cape Breton. The ship was refloated the next day without sustaining any damage. In April 1971, the ship transferred to the Fifth Canadian Destroyer Squadron.

The warship was subsequently selected by the Canadian Forces for the Destroyer Life Extension (DELEX) project. This refit was commenced on 29 October 1979 by Versatile Vickers at Montreal, Quebec and was completed on 23 May 1980. On 3 April 1986, a shell misfired in the 3-inch gun, causing injuries to the crew and civilian technicians on board at the time. On 16 August while taking part in NATO naval exercises, Saguenay collided with the German submarine U-17 and was sent home for repairs. The vessel returned to active service in 1987. In 1989, she clashed with an American fishing boat who had strayed over the border into Canadian waters. The fishing ship Concordia, who refused to stop, bumped the Canadian warship three times causing minor damage to Saguenay. The fishing vessel continued on, which led to the warship firing warning shots. Concordia did not stop and returned to American waters.

Saguenay was paid off from active service in the Canadian Forces on 26 June 1990. She was sold to the South Shore Marine Park Society which scuttled her in 1994 as an artificial reef and recreational dive site between Cross Island and Sculpin Shoal, in Lunenburg Bay, off Lunenburg, Nova Scotia.

== Assignments ==
- Third Escort Squadron 1953–1959 – Halifax
- Second Escort Squadron 1959–1965 – Esquimalt
- First Escort Squadron 1965–1971
- Fifth Escort Squadron 1971–1990
