= Glossary of bowling =

This glossary relates mainly to terms applicable to tenpin bowling. For candlepin terms, see Candlepin bowling#Terminology.

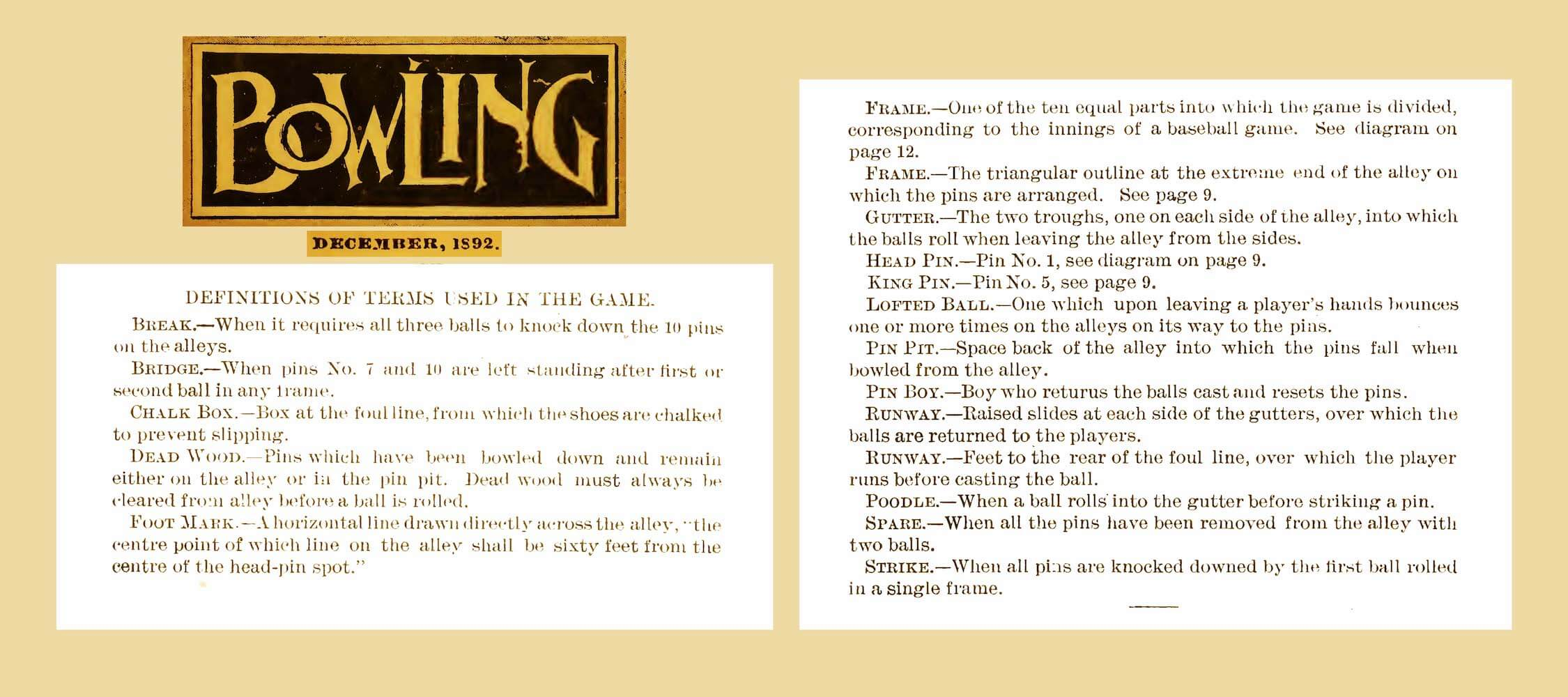
An 1892 glossary of bowling terms from a publication of Spalding's Athletic Library The glossary mentions "all three balls", in contrast to modern ten-pin bowling in which two ball rolls are allowed in each frame.

== Numerical ==
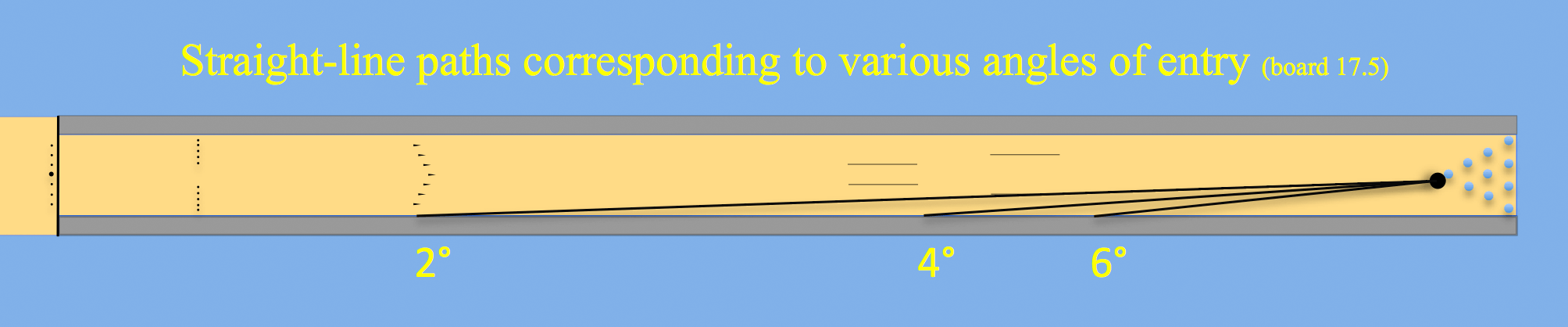
Lines corresponding to angles of entry for 2°, 4° and 6°. Hooking (curving) the ball enables greater angles of entry, which increases likelihood of strikes.

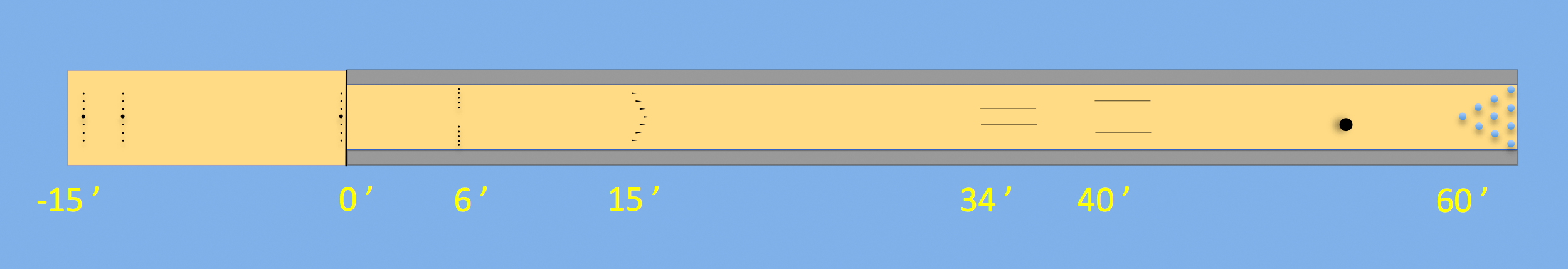
Spots (at 6 feet), arrows (at 15 feet), and downlane markers (at about 34-43 feet) can be used for targeting (aiming).

- 180 (180 stop): A pinsetter malfunction in which the sweep bar is stuck at the back of the lane, halfway (180 out of 360 degrees) through a pinsetter cycle.
- 270 (270 stop): A pinsetter malfunction in which the pin sweep is stuck at the front of the pin deck (three-quarters or 270 degrees through a 360 cycle) and the setter is unable to lower the next set of pins. In some bowling establishments depending on the machine used and its frequency, this malfunction may be incorrectly referred to as 180.
- _#_-Bagger: A string of _#_ strikes in consecutive frames within the same game (example: "six-bagger").

== Symbols ==
- X: Symbol for strike.
- / (slash): Symbol for spare.
- — (dash): Symbol for a zero-count ball. Also can denote an open frame when only the frame's overall result is shown on a scoresheet.
- ➇ (circled number): denotes a split leave. The first-ball pinfall is usually encircled. If a scoresheet is only showing frames' overall results, an open frame via split can be shown with a(n unfilled) circle, optionally with a dash in it, and a split converted for a spare can be shown as a circle with a slash through it.
- F (letter): denotes a foul by the bowler.

== A ==
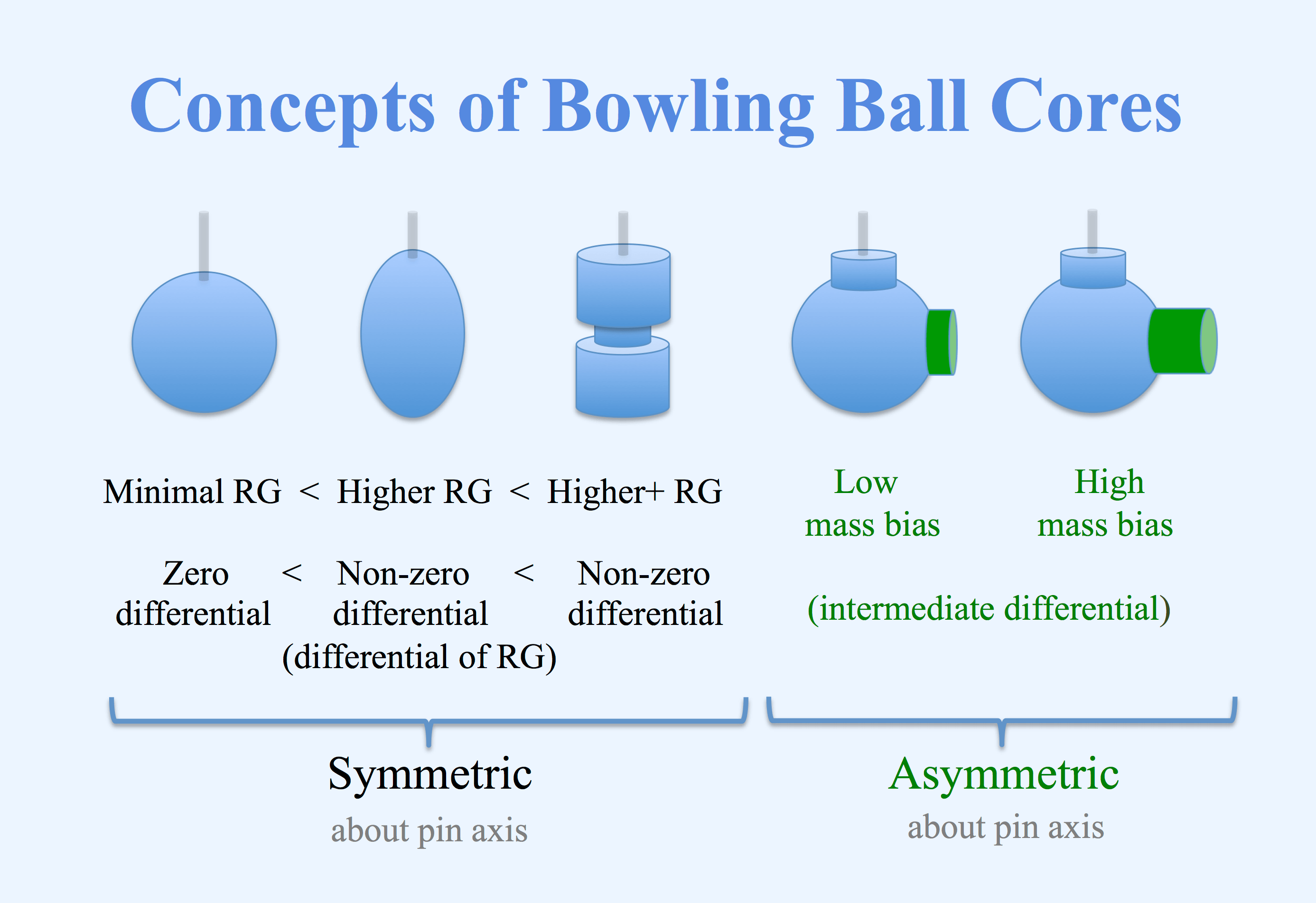
Bowling ball core ("weight block") technical specifications include RG, differential of RG, intermediate differential, and (a)symmetry. Asymmetric balls have non-zero values of intermediate differential.

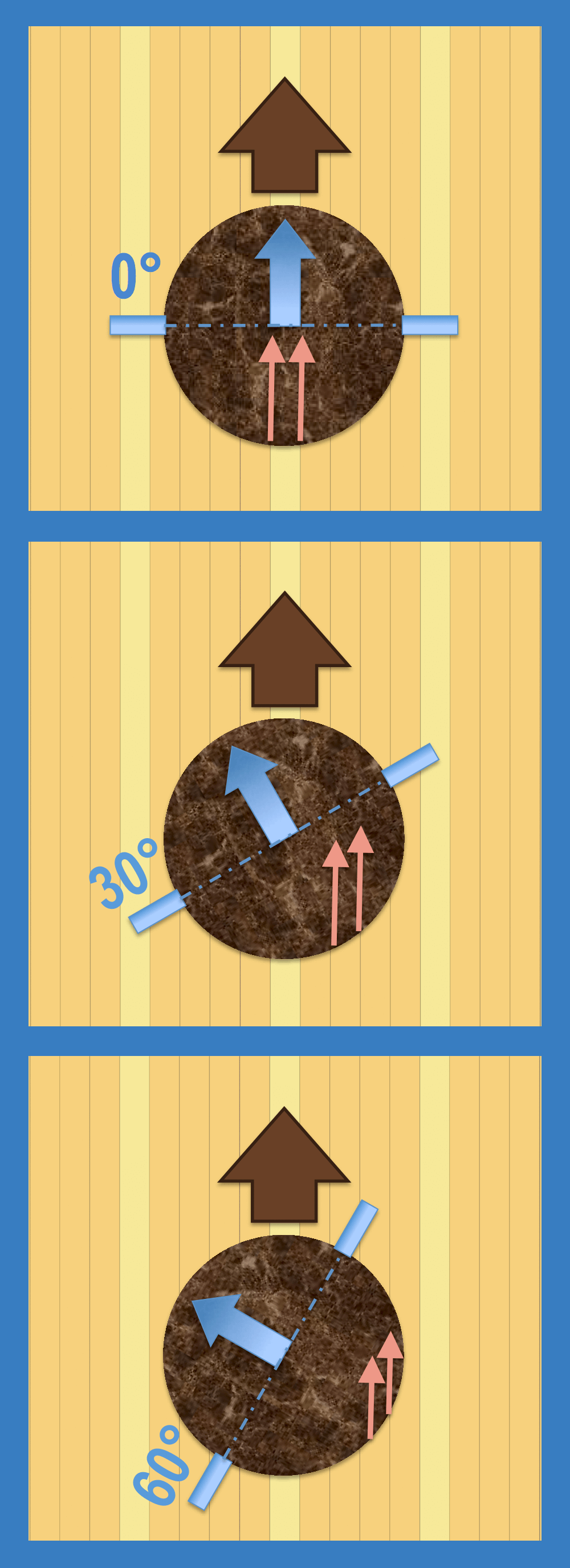
Axis rotation:
Three angles of axis rotation (blue arrows) relative to a line parallel to the boards. Brown arrows indicate direction of overall ball motion.
(top views).

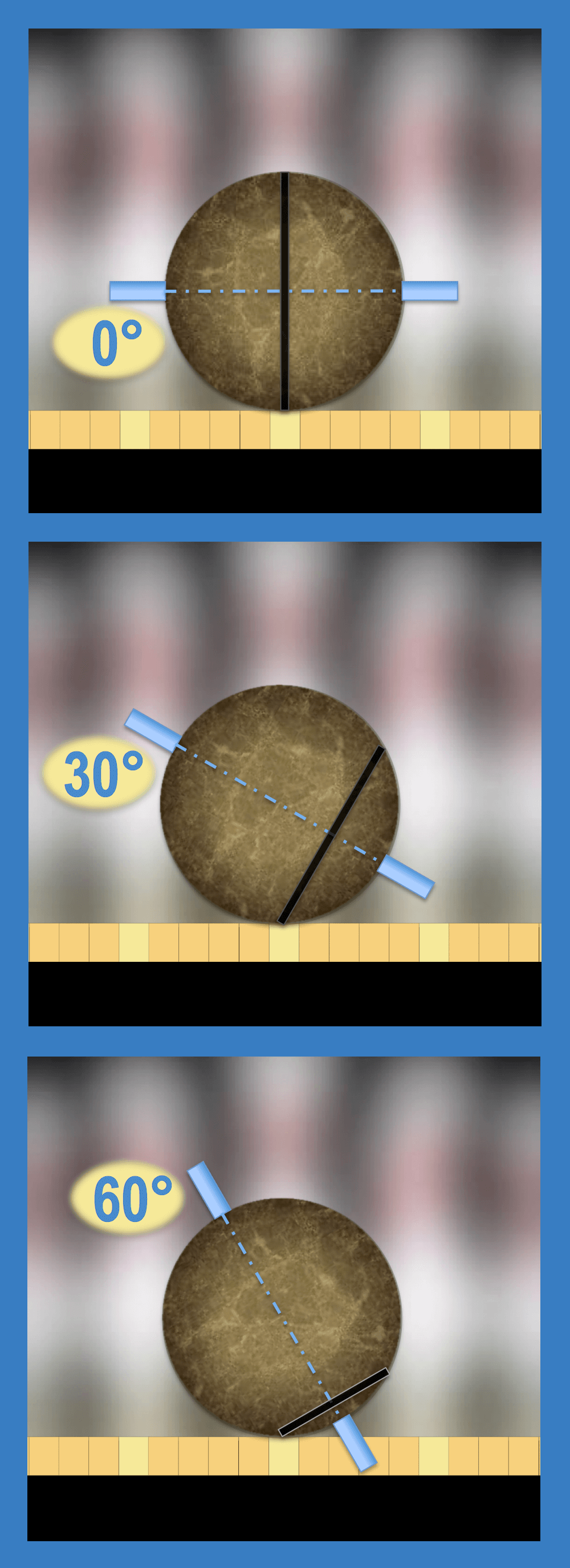
Axis tilt:
Three angles of axis tilt (blue axes) relative to the horizontal. Black lines on balls simulate ring-shaped oil tracks (initial contact with lane).
(views from behind).

- ABC: American Bowling Congress, the first enduring standards and rules governing organization for ten-pin bowling in the United States, formed in September 1895 and merged in 2005 with other organizations to form the United States Bowling Congress (USBC).
- Abralon (pad): An abrasion technology product used to "sand" ball coverstocks with different grits (degrees of roughness) to control the amount of friction between the coverstock and lane.
- Absentee (score): See blind.
- Action bowling: Bowling contests involving money betting, historically associated with the New York underworld from the 1940s to the 1970s.
- Adjust(ment): A change in technique—especially in alignment, but also in approach, delivery, targeting or ball choice—often made in response to changing lane conditions or to correct undesirable ball motion.
- Aggressive: See Strong.
- Align(ment): A choice of location of the feet during setup, location of the sliding foot at time of release, and choice of target (arrow), which collectively determine initial ball trajectory. Alignment is usually expressed in terms of board number and arrow number, for example, "standing at (board) 25, sliding at 20, looking at the second arrow".
- Anchor: In league play, the person bowling last on a team: usually the bowler with the highest average or the best performer under pressure.
- Andy Varipapa 300: 12 consecutive strikes bowled across two games.
- Angle: See Angle of entry or Delivery angle.
- Angle of entry: The angle at which the ball is moving when first impacting a pin (especially the pocket), measured with respect to a line parallel to the lane's boards. A ball that hooks has a larger angle of entry than a ball rolled in a straight line. Entry angles of 4° to 6° are thought to deliver optimum pin carry. Distinguish: delivery angle.
- Approach: The part of the delivery that precedes the release. Approach also denotes the physical area in front of the foul line, from which bowlers deliver the ball.
- (The) Arrows: Seven regularly-spaced arrowhead-shaped guides located about 15 feet past the foul line, used by many bowlers as targets for rolling the ball. The target (aiming point) is called a bowler's "mark".
- Arsenal: The set of bowling balls available for a bowler's use. Often, the term specifically refers to the limited quantity of balls permitted under rules of a particular competition. Balls in an arsenal are usually chosen to be mutually distinct in coverstock, core characteristics, and pin configuration, to achieve desired ball paths under different lane conditions.
- Asymmetric: Adjective describing a ball that is not symmetric, and therefore tending to have greater flare potential through a more aggressive reaction on the back end of the lane. Formally, asymmetric balls have RG (radius of gyration) values along the Y (high RG) and Z (intermediate RG) axes that differ by more than 5% of total differential. Adjective is also applied to the ball's core.
- Average: The total of scores from multiple games divided by the number of games, truncated down to an integer (whole-number) value.
- Axis rotation: Angle of the ball's axis of rotation in a horizontal plane, measured with respect to a line parallel to the foul line. Generally, axis rotation is imparted by turning the ball, and significantly contributes to hook. Initial axis rotation is defined at the time of release. Axis rotation is also referred to as side rotation or side roll. Distinguish: axis tilt.
- Axis tilt: Angle of the ball's axis of rotation in a vertical plane, measured with respect to the horizontal. Initial axis tilt is defined at the time of release. Distinguish: axis rotation.

== B ==
A backup ball delivery causes the ball to hook in a direction opposite that of a conventional delivery. Shown: left-handed delivery by Eric Jones hooks from right to left.

- Baby Split: A split that can be converted by hitting both pins with the ball. Examples: 3—10, 2—7, 4—5.
- Back _#_: A number, _#_, of consecutive strikes ending with the final roll of a game. For example, a player rolling strikes in the seventh, eighth and ninth frames plus three more in the tenth frame is said to have the "back six". Compare: front #_.
- Back-up ball: A ball rolled with a right-handed release that hooks left to right, or rolled with a left-handed release that hooks right to left—opposite to the hook directions of conventional releases.
- Back end: The (approx.) one-third of the lane furthest from the foul line, which generally lacks oil.

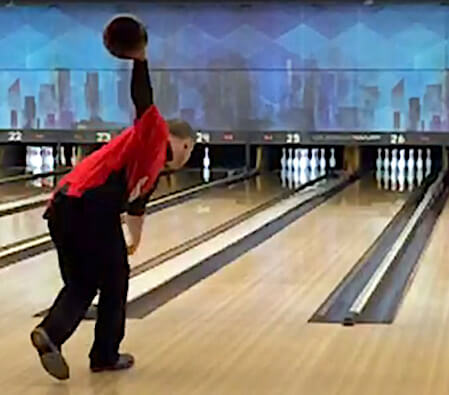
A bowler using a high backswing

- Backswing: The portion of a delivery following the push-off (push away) and preceding the forward swing and release.
- _#_-Bagger: A string of _#_ strikes in consecutive frames within the same game (example: "six-bagger").
- Baker format: A team game scoring format in which a team's members bowl frames in a repetitive order to complete a single game (example: bowler A bowls frames 1 and 6, bowler B bowls frames 2 and 7, and so forth). Named after 1950s American Bowling Congress officer Frank K. Baker.
- Balance hole: A hole drilled into a bowling ball into which a finger is not inserted. The hole, originally meant to correct static imbalance, has also been used to change the ball's intended dynamics and was banned in competition by USBC effective August 1, 2020. Also called a weight hole.
- Balance leg: The leg opposite the leg on which a bowler slides in the final slide step, so named because the moving balance leg provides a counter-balance to the motion of the ball immediately before and during release, thus helping to stabilize the bowler's body position.
- Ball down: To switch to a ball that hooks further downlane. Opposite of ball up. See related discussion at Strong.
- Ball reaction: Change in direction of ball motion due to frictional contact with the lane surface, the term often applied to describe the amount of hook. Often shortened to reaction.

A ball's average speed can be estimated based on its time of travel over the sixty feet from the foul line to the headpin. Because of friction, a ball's speed decreases between release and reaching the pins.

- Ball speed: Rate at which a ball as a whole moves down the lane (usually expressed in miles per hour, MPH). Distinguish: rev rate, which describes a ball's rotational velocity (expressed in revolutions per minute, RPM).
- Ball up: To switch to a ball that hooks sooner. Opposite of ball down. See related discussion at Strong.
- Bananas: a pinsetter malfunction in which the pinsetter has an incomplete load and is stuck at full lift.
- Beer frame: A frame in which the only bowler not to roll a strike, or the one who achieves the lowest score, has to buy beer for the rest of their team.
- Behind the ball: A position of the hand on the ball, furthest or nearly furthest from the pins and away from the side, generally thought to impart a modest but controllable amount of side rotation to modern reactive resin bowling balls. Designed to avoid a chicken wing delivery.
- Benchmark ball: A ball whose coverstock, core, and layout most reliably match a bowler's style under expected lane conditions—often chosen from an arsenal as a default (first-to-use) ball. Benchmark balls often have symmetrical cores, lower RGs, and medium to strong differentials, and may have solid reactive coverstocks for predictable motion and strong downlane continuation.
- Benchmark reaction: A ball reaction involving a medium hook and a medium amount of angularity at the breakpoint, chosen to be readily manipulated to adjust speed, axis rotation, and loft.
- BFO (beer frame opportunity): A situation in which no more than one member of a team has failed to get a strike in a particular frame before the last member bowls, creating the possibility for a beer frame if it ends with only one missed strike.
- Big Four: A split where only the 4, 6, 7 and 10 pins are standing.

Bracket: a partially-completed tree diagram representing pairings in a 16-player single-elimination tournament

- Bird dog: See messenger.
- Blended condition versus Blocked condition (or Blocked lane): Especially in typical house shot (THS) oil patterns, the oil pattern has high oil volume on the middle boards to allow a shot missed to the inside to slide toward the pocket and not cross over, and has low oil volume on the outer boards to cause a shot missed to the outside to hook back toward the pocket. The differing oil concentrations are conceived to increase the margin of error for a strike. Blended conditions occur when the contrast from the oily center to the dry sides is small—smaller than blocked conditions. With blended conditions, there is less danger of skidding too far in the oil or hooking too strongly on the outside, reducing chances of encountering the undesirable over/under phenomenon.
- Blind (score): In league play, a score given to a team member who is absent for a particular session, with the score usually being the player's current average less a certain number of pins. Also called "absentee score" or "dummy score". Distinguish: vacancy.
- Blocked: Refer to Blended.
- Blow-out-five (BOF):^{[Questionable]} On a full rack, the ball hits light in the pocket, but still hits the 5-pin and makes it fly into the 7-pin (or 10-pin for left-handed releases) to strike. Broadcaster Nelson Burton Jr. used this term. If the result of a pocket hit like this leaves a corner pin, the resulting leave is a "Swishing 7 (or 10)". Swishing 7-10 splits can even happen.
- Bo Derek: Used by Rob Stone, ten consecutive strikes in the same game, referring to the actress' best-known film.
- Board: A longitudinally placed wooden board or synthetic substitute, 39 of which constitute the 41.5-inch width of a lane. Boards are considered to be numbered 1 through 39, increasing from right to left for right-handed releases. Boards 5, 10, 15... 35 have marker arrows.
- Bracket(s): A contest format in which bowlers are divided into groups (the "brackets"), and each bowler is paired against another bowler in the group in the first round of what is usually a single-elimination tournament. Bracket competition is often conducted in parallel with regular tournament or league competition. More generally, the term bracket denotes a tree diagram representing how contestants are paired against each other.
- Breakdown: Process by which repeated ball traversals along a path incrementally remove oil from the path so it presents increased friction to subsequently-rolled balls, thus reducing their length. See also: burn. Breakdown is one aspect of lane transition. Distinguish: carry-down.
- Breakpoint: A term with varying definitions: the point at which the ball is at its most outside position (closest to the gutter); the point of maximum change in direction; the point at which the ball transitions from skid to traction and begins the roll phase; or the point 5-7 feet beyond the end of the oil pattern at which the ball begins to change direction ("break"). Distinguish: length.
- Bridge: The distance between the finger holes. Distinguish: span.
- Broken (wrist position): A position of the wrist during delivery in which the back of the hand is bent toward the outside of the forearm (palm being opened). A broken-wrist-position delivery provides less rev rate and hook potential. Opposite of cupped. The broken wrist position is sometimes called the unloaded position or reverse tilt position.
- Brooklyn: A roll in which the ball crosses over the centerline to impact the pins on a side opposite the pocket. Also called a Jersey in the New York City area, or Windsor in the Metro Detroit area. The term Brooklyn, by itself, is sometimes used informally to refer specifically to a Brooklyn strike.
- Bucket: a spare leave of either the 2-4-5-8, 3-5-6-9 or (more rarely) 1-2-3-5 pins.
- Bumpers: Rails (barriers) surrounding a lane to prevent balls from going into the gutters, primarily for beginners or young children.
- Burn or burn up: Phenomenon or intentional competitive strategy by which a large amount of ball traffic on a particular path removes lane oil from that path, causing subsequently rolled balls to encounter increased friction. Term is often used to describe change in lane characteristics during long tournaments in which lanes are not repeatedly re-oiled. See breakdown.
- Burning out and burning up: The energy of the ball is said to be burning out if it skids too far down the lane and hooks too late to achieve good end-over-end motion in the roll phase. Conversely, the energy of a ball is said to be burning up if it hooks too early and hits the pins flat or deflects.

== C ==
- Can opener: A light pocket hit strike in which the pins fall sideways instead of back into the pit, often with the ball contacting both the 5 and 6 pins after a right-handed release (4 and 5 pins as a left-handed release).
- Carry: See pin carry.
- Carry-down: Process by which balls, having picked up oil from the oil pattern, deposit it in the normally dry back end to cause subsequently rolled balls to slide and thus extend their length before hooking. Porous, softer-surface solid reactive balls tend to leave wider streaks of oil, whereas less porous, harder pearl reactive balls tend to leave narrower streaks. Carry-down is one aspect of lane transition. Distinguish: breakdown.
- Challenge match: In Japan, an event where a popular bowler, usually a licensed professional, hosts a tournament, allowing paying participants to compete for money and prizes. Typical event consists of three games. The host receives a payment, minus the funds used to pay off the bowlers who defeated the host.
- Cash (verb): In a competition, to place high enough to earn a cash reward.
- Channel: Formal term for gutter. One of two trough-shaped structures surrounding a lane to catch errant rolls.
- Check (verb): The action of a lane surface, especially after the end of the oil pattern, to cause a bowling ball to alter its skid and begin to hook.
- Cheesy cakes: Also: "cake shot". Lanes on which strikes are relatively easy.
- Cherry pick: See chop.
- Chicken sandwich: Three consecutive spares, preceded and followed by strikes.

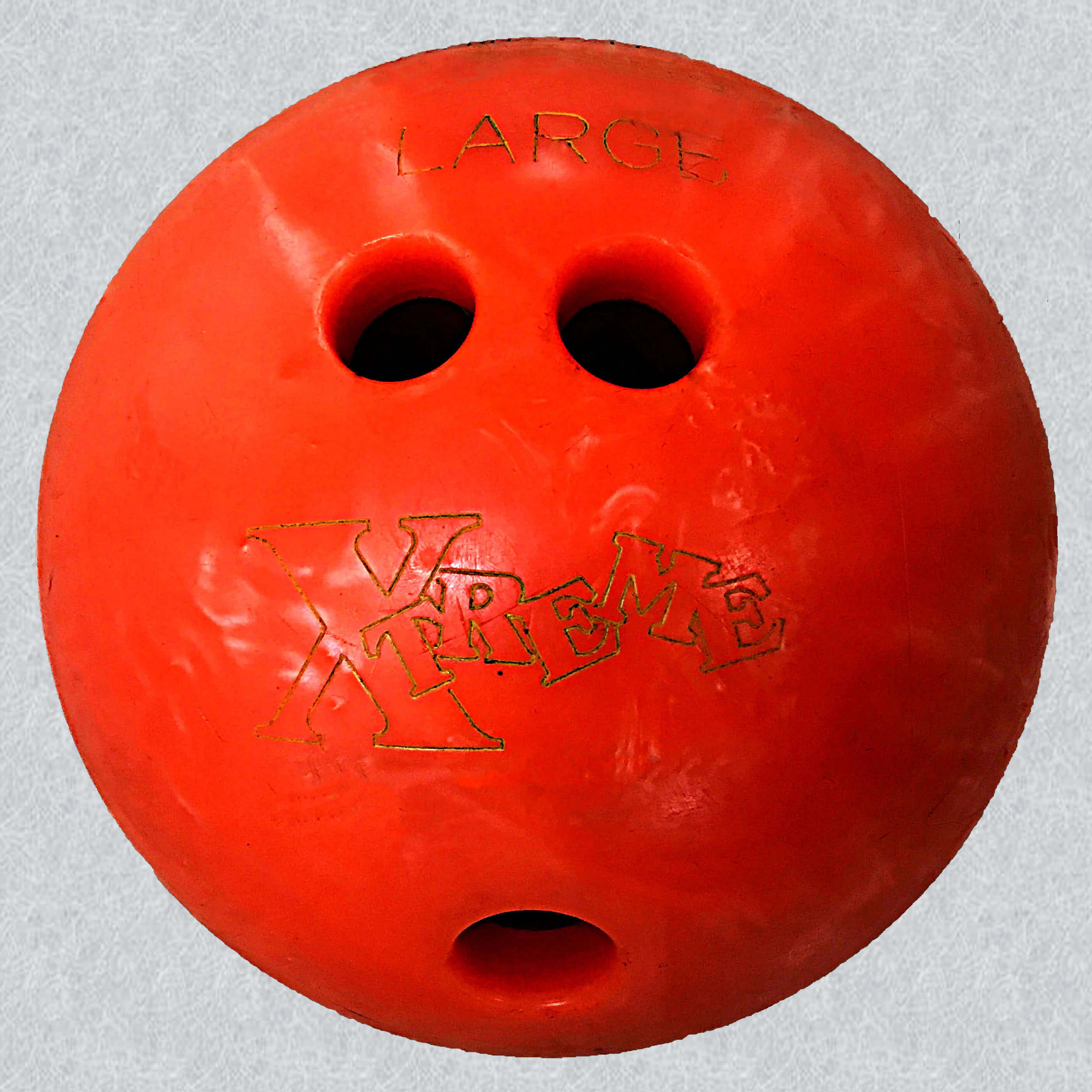
A house ball with a conventional grip: large, non-customized finger holes are relatively close to the thumb hole compared to balls with fingertip grip.

- Chicken wing: A delivery in which the bowler's elbow is undesirably bent and extends outward to the side, rather than remaining behind the hand in line with the intended ball delivery path. Chicken winging is disfavored because it confounds the desirable action of the wrist and fingers in rotating the ball and generally results in a weaker release and diminished side rotation.
- Chop: In an attempt to convert a spare having at least two pins, the bowler knocks down the front-most pin while failing to knock down a pin that is immediately diagonally adjacent. Example: knocking the 2 and 4 down but leaving the 5 pin. A modern interpretation of the term includes picking only the middle pin out of, for example, the 1-3-6 or 3-6-10 (right handed release).
- Christmas tree pattern: A seldom encountered, generally triangular oil pattern having oil laid down about the centerline in progressively smaller widths at progressively greater distances from the foul line, with the centerline having oil applied at the longest distance down the lane. The Christmas tree pattern is distinct from the typical house shot, which has wider and longer dry areas adjacent the gutters and a more rectangular oil path surrounding the centerline.
- Clean game: A game with a mark (spare or strike) in all ten frames.
- Closed (body position, esp. closed shoulders): Describes a body position in which the shoulders (especially) are directed squarely downlane and not to the outside; is commonly adopted by strokers, a style favoring repeatable accuracy over power. Compare: open (body position).
- Clover:^{[Questionable]} Four strikes in a row. A reference to four-leaf clover.
- Coiled (wrist): Wrist position in which the palm is cupped (palm closer to the forearm) so as to cradle the ball, usually recommended in the early part of the forward swing. Recommended deliveries involve subsequently moving the wrist from the coiled position to the uncoiled (open) position before release.
- Come back: Of a ball: to hook. The term is usually applied when a ball seemingly was headed too low but ended up hooking adequately.
- Conditioner: Lubricating lane oil.
- Continuation: A ball's retention of energy to be applied to and through the pins, as distinguished from "rolling out" which indicates a ball's loss of energy before reaching the pins. Continuation is considered to promote greater pin carry and higher probability of striking. Many factors (ball weight, ball speed, etc.) determine continuation, but some commentators favor ball paths that are smooth (having a longer hook phase) over skid/flip ball paths (having a sharper hook further down the lane to provide greater angle of entry).
- Conventional grip or conventional fit: A ball grip in which fingers are inserted to the second knuckle from the fingertips; characteristic of house balls. Compare: fingertip grip.

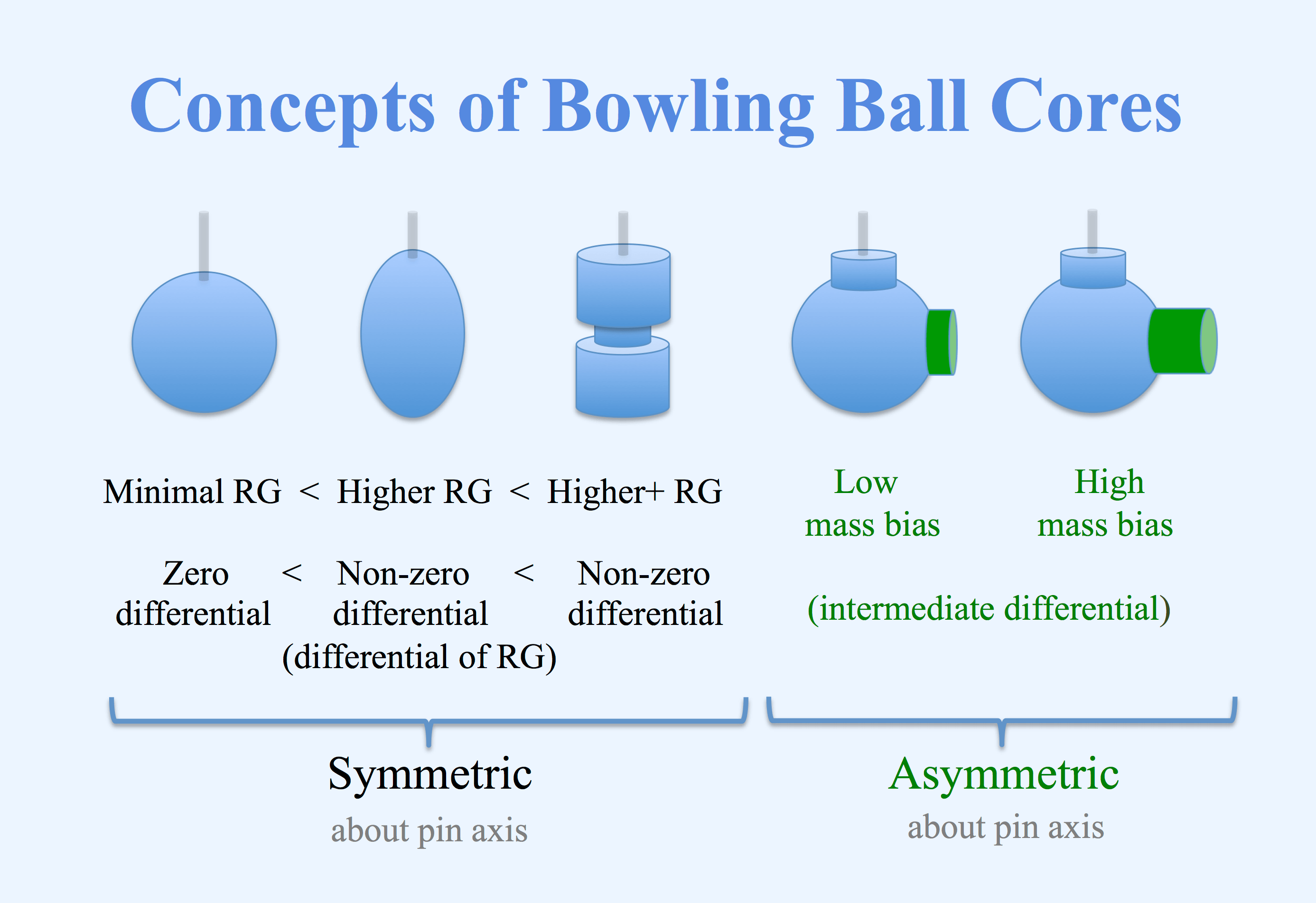
Conceptual diagram of bowling ball cores

- Conversion (convert): In the second ball roll of a frame, the knocking down of all pins that remained standing after the first roll, so as to achieve a spare for that frame. Term is often preceded by the number(s) of the pins involved (example: "3–6–10 conversion").
- Core: A dense structure inside a ball that can be shaped, located and oriented to strategically affect ball motion. Sometimes called a "weight block". See Bowling ball#Effect of coverstock, core and layout on ball motion
- Corner pin: The 7-pin or the 10-pin.
- Count: See pin count.
- Cover (a spare): Another word for converting a spare. The term can also denote knocking down one or more specific pins even if a spare is not achieved, as in "covering the 6 and 10".

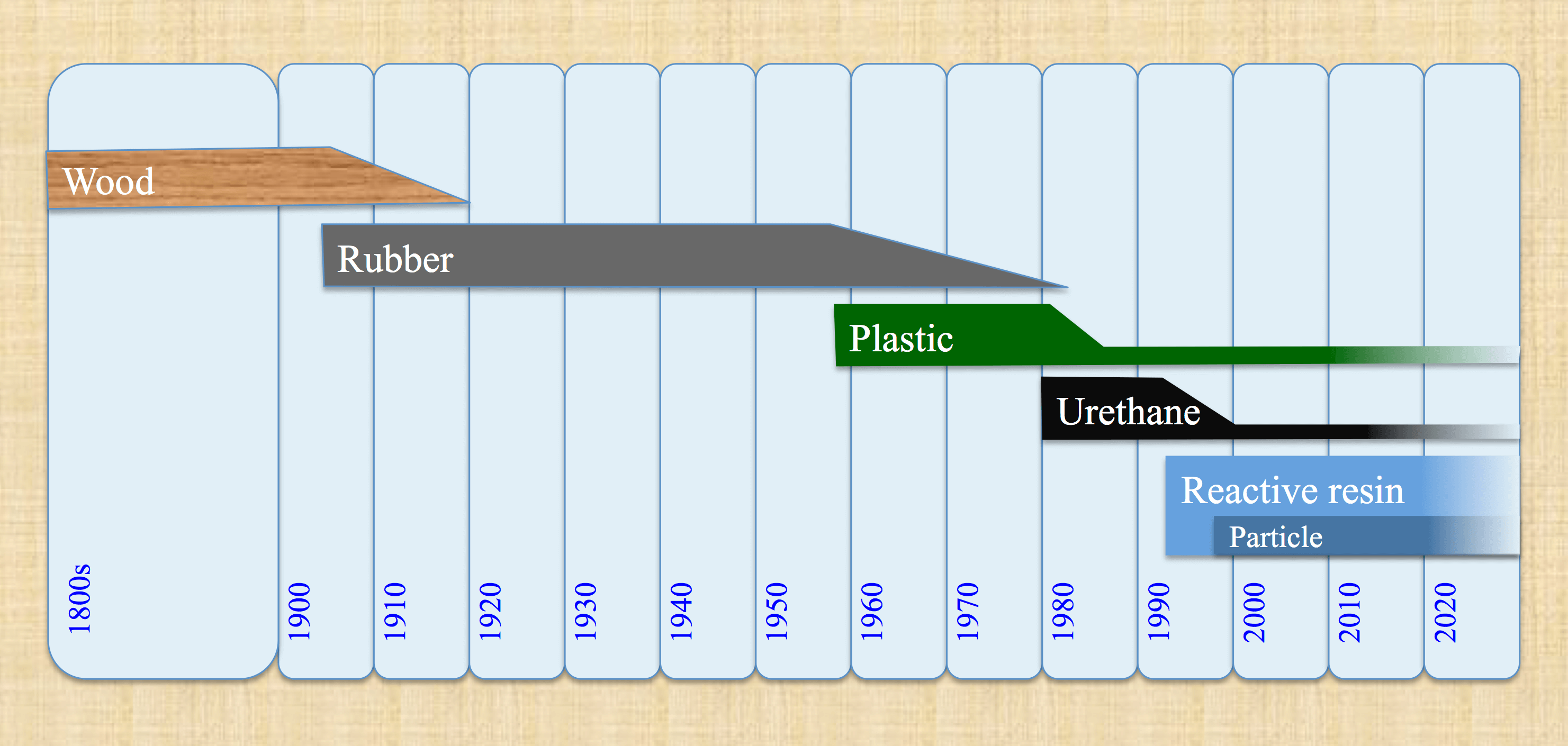
Timeline of ball coverstock technology

- Coverstock: The material comprising a ball's outer surface (cover), which determines the ball's frictional engagement with the lane and thus substantially affects ball motion. Coverstocks include polyester ("plastic"), polyurethane ("urethane") and reactive resin ("reactive").
- Cranker: A bowler who rolls the ball with a high rev rate (rotations per minute), a style favoring power over control and repeatability. Compare: stroker.
- Cross over: Of a ball: to pass from the right side to the left side of the center board (for right hand deliveries) before impacting any pins. See Brooklyn.
- Cupped (wrist position): A position of the wrist during delivery in which the palm is positioned toward the inner forearm, forming a "cup" to hold the ball. A cupped-position delivery enables higher rev rates and hook potential. Opposite of broken wrist. The cupped wrist position is sometimes called the loaded position or forward tilt position.
- Current Frame Scoring System: An alternate scoring system (most recently used in the World Bowling Tour finals) in which any strike is counted as 30 pins, while a spare is counted as 10 pins plus the first ball count in the current frame (example: 8 pins followed by a spare is scored as 18). Open frames count total pinfall in the frame only, as with conventional scoring. There are no bonus rolls in the tenth frame, so a perfect score is 300.

== D ==
One-handed (conventional) delivery

One-handed deliveries generally involve the thumb and two fingers of one hand. Hand rotation surrounding the instant of delivery can induce axis rotation (side rotation), causing the ball to hook (curve). Shown: E.J. Tackett, 2019.

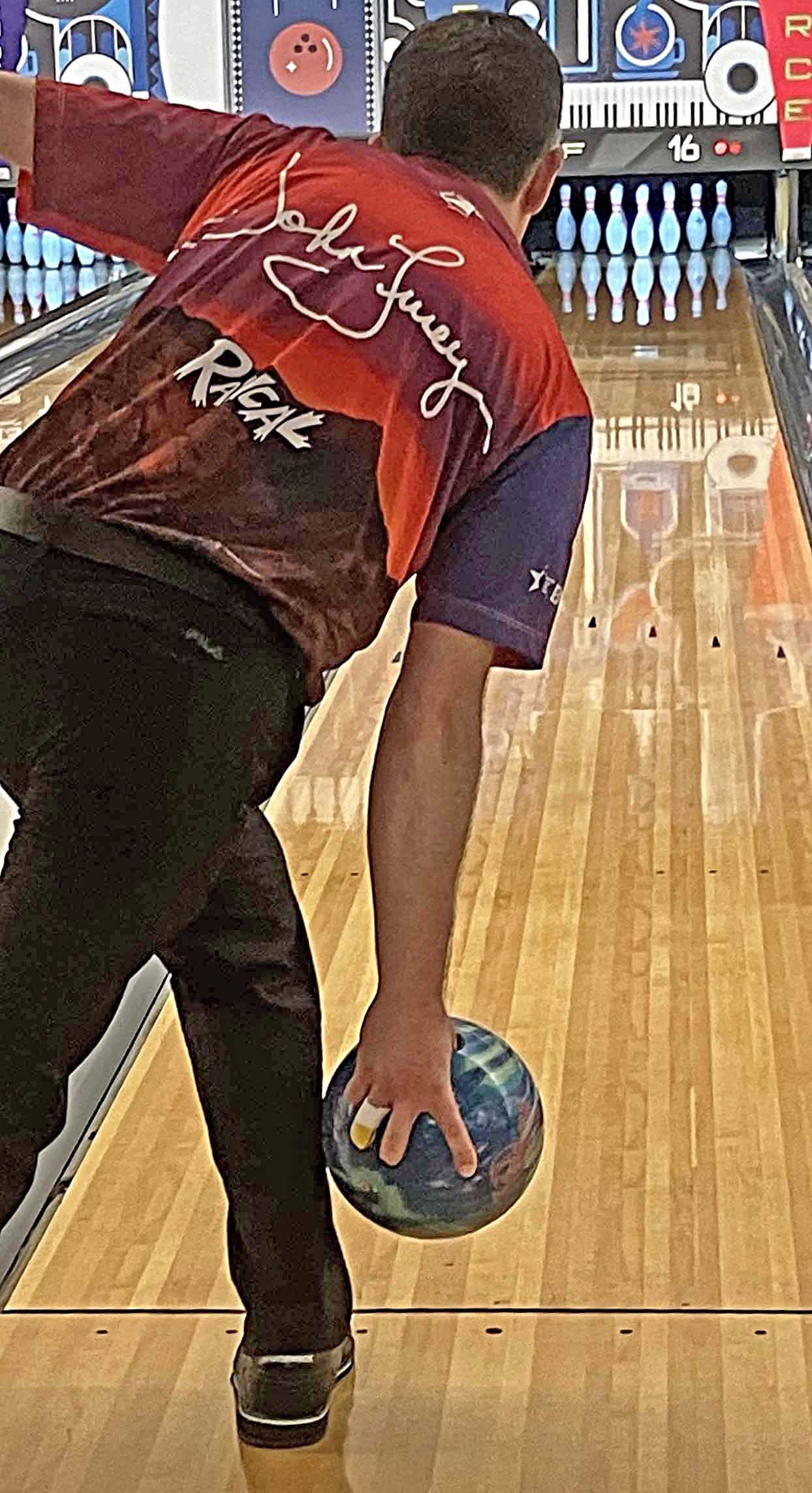
A conventional (one-handed) delivery. Shown: John Furey, 2024.

In most two-handed deliveries, the last moment of the release involves only one hand. Since the thumb is never inserted, strong axis rotation and hooking can be achieved. Shown: Kyle Troup, 2022.

- Deadwood or dead wood: Fallen pin(s) left on the lane after a roll, or in the channel (gutter) out of reach of the sweeper.
- Deck: See pin deck.
- Deck (table) jam: A pinsetter malfunction in which the pinsetter is stuck and pins fall out of it.
- Deep: See inside.
- Delivery: The process beginning with the bowler's approach toward the foul line, and ending with the bowler's release of the ball.
- Delivery angle: The angle at which a bowling ball is released, measured horizontally with respect to a line parallel to the boards. A ball with a "wide" (large) delivery angle "covers more boards" laterally than one delivered with a small delivery angle. Small delivery angles are associated with down and in deliveries. Delivery angles range from about -2° (for straight ball bowlers) to about +8° (for crankers). Bowlers adjust delivery angles to adapt to lane transition. The delivery angle is sometimes called the launch angle. Distinguish: angle of entry into the pins.
- Delivery style: A personal variation in how a ball is delivered to the lane. In rough order of power, delivery styles include: two-handed cranker, two finger/no thumb, cranker, power tweener, tweener, power stroker, stroker, straight, backup ball, USA spinner, UFO spinner, push ramp, disabled delivery ramp, retractable-handled bowling balls.
- Differential (of RG): Difference between radii of gyration (RG) values of a ball along two axes, indicating the ball's flare potential. Larger flare potentials enable more angular motion from the breakpoint to the pocket, whereas smaller flare potentials yield a smoother arc motion.
- Double: Two consecutive strikes within a single game.
- Double wood: A leave of two pins (the 2-8, the 3-9 or the rarer 1-5), the hidden one of which is called a sleeper.
- Down and in: Ball motion in which the skid is essentially parallel to the lane's boards ("down..."), generally before smoothly hooking ("... and in"). Distinguished from: skid paths that "cover" (cross) many boards at an angle moving toward the gutter, before hooking back.
- Downlane markers: Two pairs of three-foot long guide lines beginning 34 and 40 feet past the foul line, often used by bowlers to help determine on which board their balls reach their breakpoint. Also called range finders.
- Drift: Lateral movement of a bowler's foot position between (initial) setup position and (final) sliding position, measured in boards left or right. Example: "a three-board drift to the left". One source calls this definition "lateral movement" and asserts that drift is more properly defined as unwanted variation away from a consistent desired lateral movement.
- Dry (esp. dry lane(s)): Adjective describing a lane, or a portion of a lane, that has little or no lubricating oil. Dry surfaces frictionally engage the surface of bowling balls to increase their hook.
- Dummy score: See blind.
- Dutch 200: A game consisting only of alternating strikes and spares which always results in a score of exactly 200.

== E ==
- Early timing: Timing characteristic of a delivery in which the ball is released before the sliding foot slides. Compare: late timing.
- Emergency service (UK): Knocking down 9 pins in three successive frames—a reference to the "999" emergency telephone number in the U.K.
- End over end: A release that imparts more forward roll on a bowling ball, as opposed to side roll. See axis rotation.
- Energy profile: A chart of the translational energy (ball moving down the lane) and rotational energy (like a gyroscope) as a function of distance as the ball travels down the lane. Retaining energy, such as by delaying when the ball hooks, allows more energy to be imparted to the pins.
- Entry angle: See angle of entry.
- Error: older term for a non-split open frame.

== F ==
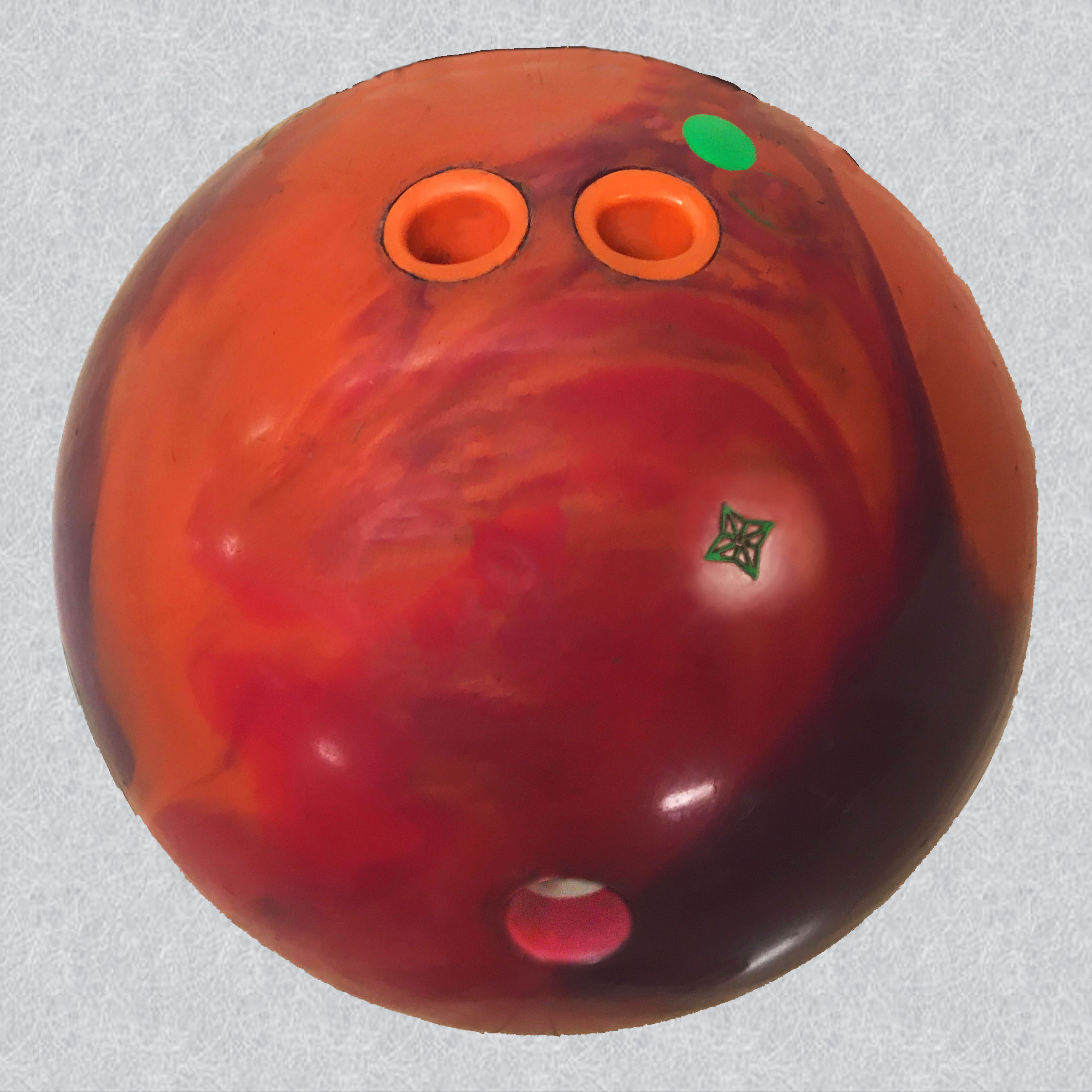
A custom-drilled ball with a fingertip grip; finger holes are relatively far from the thumb hole, compared to balls having a conventional grip.

- Fall(ing) off: Bowlers are said to "fall off (the shot)" if, soon after delivery, their bodies tip away from a stable position, especially as a result of improper balance. Opposite of posting a shot.
- Fast 8: An apparent high flush pocket hit causing the 2 pin to deflect around the 4 and 7 pins, leaving both (right-handed release).
- Farkel: See messenger.
- Fence: Frame in which none of bowlers scored either strike or spare.
- Field goal: A failed 7-10 split conversion attempt in which the ball goes between the two pins.
- Fill ball or Fill frame: Roll(s) after a tenth-frame spare or strike(s), needed to determine bonus points that complete ("fill") the frame.
- Finals or Final rounds: The last stage of a tournament, which in professional tournaments is usually in stepladder format.
- Fingertip grip or fingertip fit: A ball grip in which fingers are inserted only to the first knuckle from the fingertips (thumb is still inserted completely); used especially in custom-drilled balls to allow fingers to impart more rotational force. Compare: conventional grip.
- Finish: The degree of a ball surface's rough or smooth physical texture, which may be changed by sandpaper or polish. Distinguish: the microscopically-determined chemical "stickiness" characterizing reactive resin balls.
- Flare: See track flare. Distinguish: a ball's flare potential.
- Flare potential: Hook potential (determined by a ball's coverstock, core, layout, speed and rev rate). Flare potential is an indicator of how sharply a ball will hook. A ball's flare potential is distinguished from the track flare phenomenon.

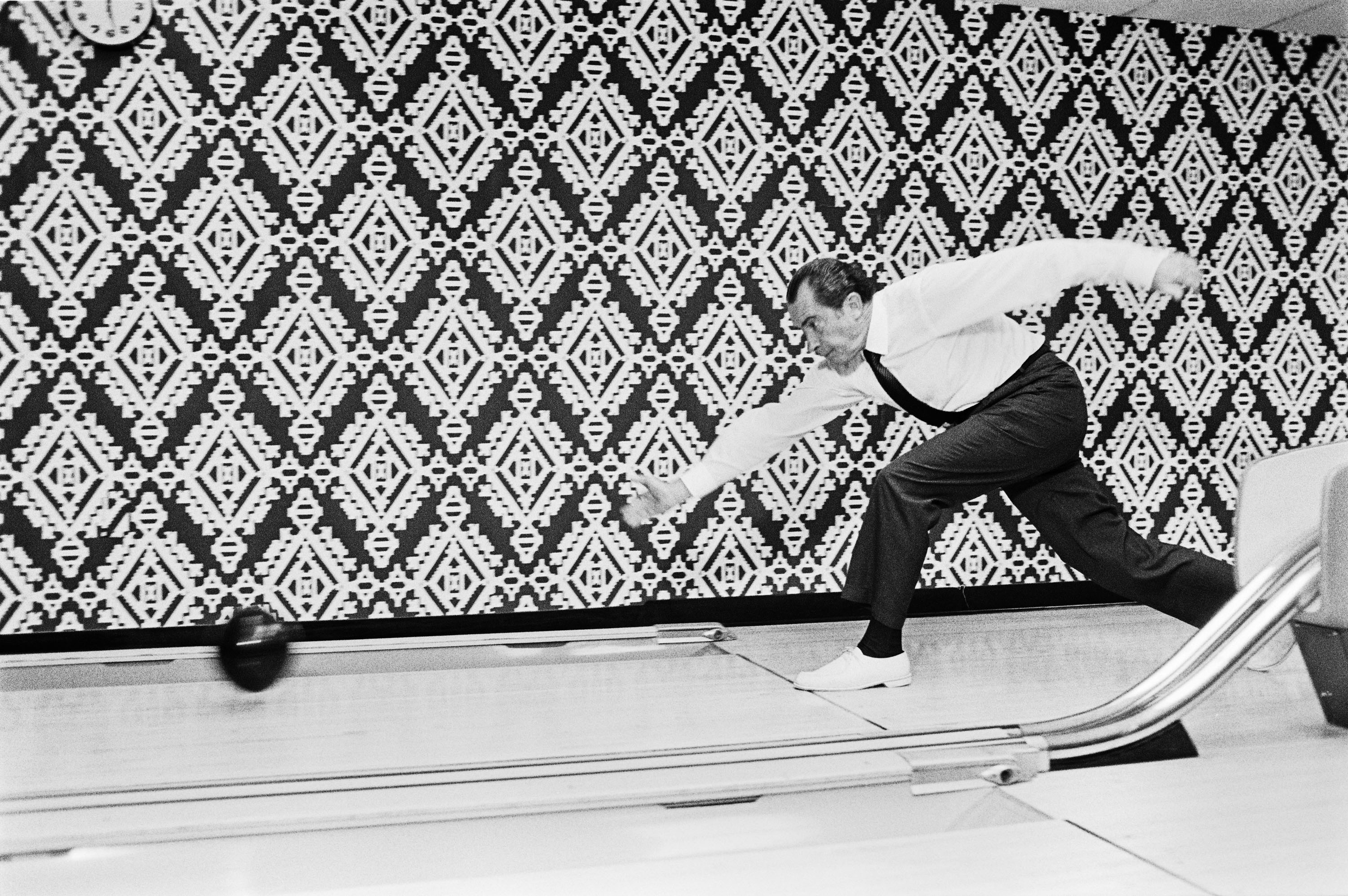
Example of a foul (left foot crosses foul line)

- Flat (oil pattern): Adjective describing an oil pattern that does not have much variation in deposited oil, especially along lines laterally across the lane. Sport patterns are typically flatter than typical house patterns.
- Flat 10: A leave of the 10 pin, in which the 6 pin lies "flat" in the gutter. Also called "Weak 10" or "Quitter 10". Compare: ringing 10. Equivalent for a left-handed release is the Flat 7.
- Flatten (out the ball): See Forward roll.
- Flush: A solid pocket hit, usually sending all ten pins into the pit.
- Follow-through: The continued motion of the bowling arm after ball release, used to help ensure the ball rolls over a target.
- Forward roll: An "end-over-end" ball motion in which the direction of rotation is in the ball's overall direction of motion, with little or no axis rotation (side rotation) and minimal hook. Forward roll is achieved by keeping the fingers behind the ball throughout delivery. Sometimes called flattening out the ball, forward roll is very different from the suitcase roll in which the fingers are on the side of the ball. Typically, bowlers flatten out the ball to convert certain spares.
- Foul: Penalty occurrence in which a portion of the bowler's body touches beyond the foul line on a delivery in which the ball is released. The bowler receives a score of zero for that particular roll.
- Foundation frame: The 9th frame (if a bowler strikes, that will lay a "foundation" for the final frame).
- Frame: One of ten scoring units constituting a game, each including one or two rolls (two or three in 10th frame) depending on pinfall.
- Freefall pinsetter: Traditional pinsetter having a complex mechanism for gathering and arranging pins into racks for lowering. Distinguish: String pinsetters, which are connected to the pins by cords that retract the pins after a roll.
- Front _#_: A number, _#_, of consecutive strikes beginning with frame 1. Example: "She started with the front 4." Compare: back #_.
- In front of (a bowler): A ball path that leads directly from the bowler's release point relatively straight down the lane essentially parallel to the boards. This path is distinguished from that of a ball that is released at an angle and hooks (curves) more. See Down and in.
- Front end or The fronts: The front part of the lane—also called the heads—roughly from the foul line to the arrows. Precedes the midlane and back end.
- Fry Frame:^{[Questionable]} Variant of beer frame.
- Full Murray: A 5–7–10 leave.
- Full roller: A delivery with zero axis tilt, in which the oil track on the ball traverses the full diameter of the ball as it rolls (see axis tilt diagram, above).

== G ==
The texture of ball surfaces—measured in "grit" of abrasives used—affects ball path (skid distance and hook intensity).

- (Go) off the sheet: See strike out. Derived during the time when bowling was scored manually on paper.
- Grandma's teeth: A 4-7-9-10 split or any "big five" split combination, resembling a mouth with missing teeth.
- Gravity swing: A delivery in which a bowler relies primarily on gravity to govern pendulum-like motion of a relatively relaxed bowling arm throughout the delivery, as distinguished from using muscular tension to control or restrict motion of the ball.
- Grip: The arrangement and intended use of a ball's holes, categorized as conventional grip or fingertip grip. Also used synonymously with grip pressure.
- Grip pressure: The amount of pressure applied by the fingers and thumb in grasping the ball during delivery. With modern reactive resin balls, especially those that are custom-drilled, less gripping pressure is required to achieve desired axis rotation.

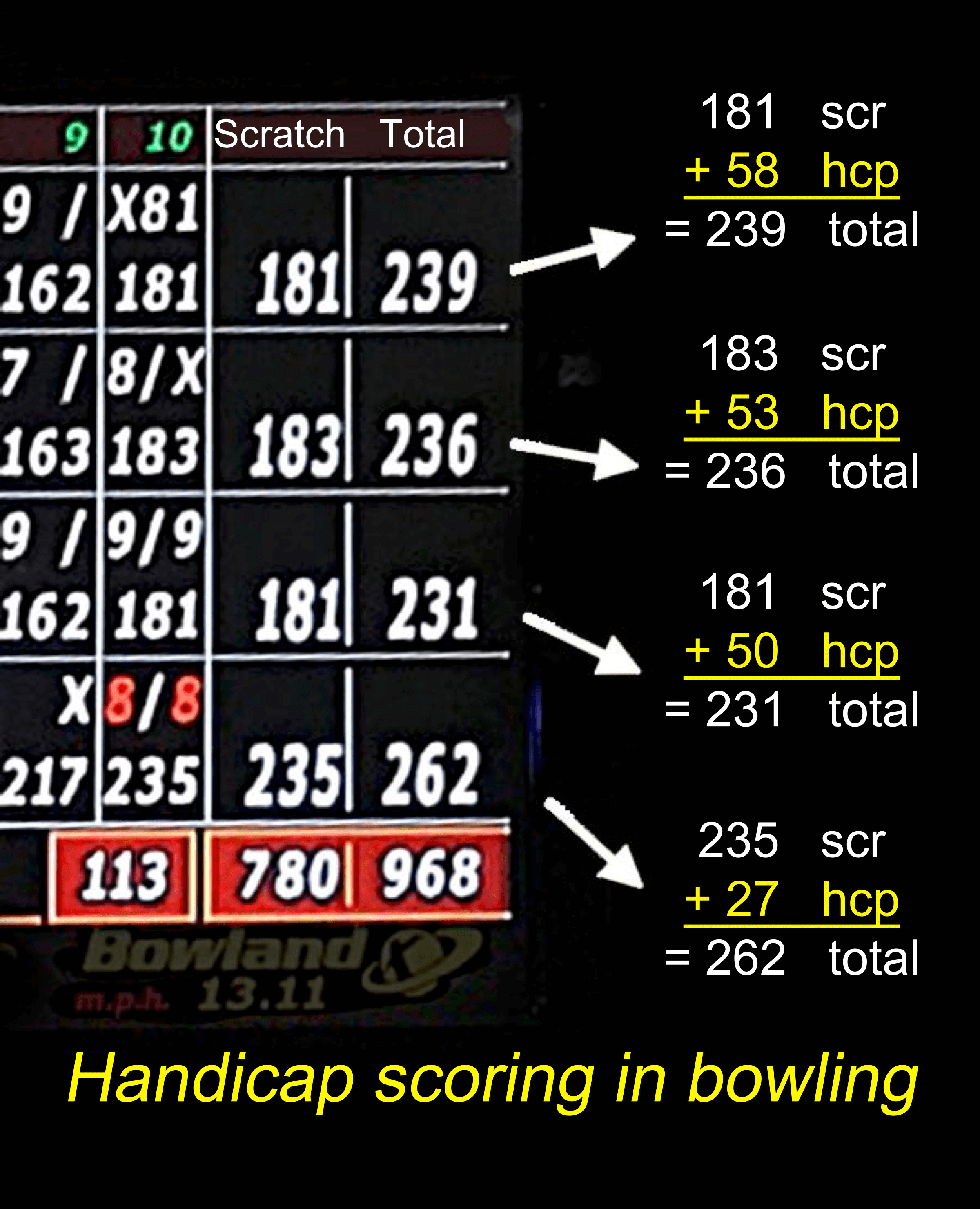
Handicap scoring: Though the second bowler's scratch score 183 is higher than the first bowler's scratch score 181, the first bowler's higher handicap (58 vs. 53) causes his total 239 to exceed the second bowler's total 236.

- Greek Church: A 4-6-7-9-10 or 4-6-7-8-10 split, resembling five spires of a Greek Orthodox church.
- Grit: A degree of coarseness of an abrasive product used to "sand" (abrade) ball coverstocks to affect frictional engagement with the lane and control ball reaction. Grits commonly range from 180 (rougher, for more friction on oily surfaces and earlier hooking) to 4000 (finer, for less friction on oily surfaces and a longer skid).
- Gutter: See channel.

== H ==
- Half a loaf: When 5 pins are left after the first shot on either half of the lane (2-4-5-7-8 for right-handers, 3-5-6-9-10 for left-handers).
- Hambone: Commonly: four consecutive strikes within a game; coining of the term credited to announcer Rob Stone in the mid-2000s. Earlier, the term denoted two consecutive strikes within a game.
- Hand: A somewhat ambiguous term, usually denoting the amount of rotation of the wrist and fingers during release. Example: "using less hand" reduces side rotation, resulting in a milder hook.
- Handicap: An integer (whole number, with no fraction) added to a "scratch score" to form a "handicap score". Generally, handicaps make lower-average bowlers have handicap scores that are close to handicap scores of higher-average bowlers, to make matches more evenly competitive. Handicaps are informally expressed as "xx percent of yyy", such as "90% of 220". More accurately, the handicap is 90% of the difference between 220 and the bowler's average, truncated to an integer value.

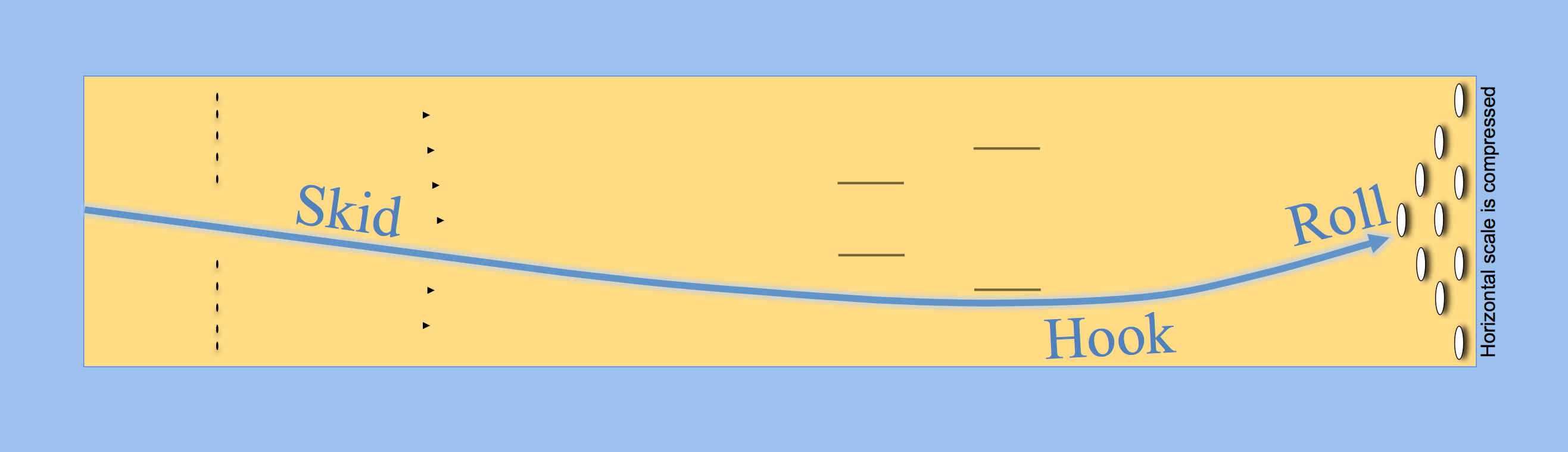
The hook is the second of three phases of ball motion. (Horizontal scale is compressed)

A ball's motion, especially its hook, is governed by several factors.

- Hang (verb, noun) A ball is said to hang (verb) when it fails to hook as soon as desired, a phenomenon sometimes attributed to lane topography. Hang (noun) refers to the area on the lane at which the ball fails to hook as desired. Distinguish: Hung.
- Head pin: The 1-pin.
- (The) Heads: The front part of the lane, roughly from the foul line to the arrows. Precedes the midlane and back end.
- Heavy: See high. Opposite of light.
- Hook: The second of three phases of ball motion—following the skid phase and preceding the roll phase—characterized by maximum change in ball direction. Hook is mainly caused by a ball's frictional engagement with a lane in its side rotation (rotation not in the same direction as the ball's overall forward motion); hook is also affected by dynamic imbalances in the ball's internal structure (core design and orientation).
- High: Adjective describing shots that impact the pins undesirably inside from center pocket. Opposite of low.
- High flush: A strike in which the ball apparently impacts high of center pocket, but still sends all ten pins to the pit (a flush).
- Hit up (on the ball): To purposely lift up on the ball with the fingers at the last moment of release, traditionally in an attempt to produce a greater rev rate with balls before reactive resin balls were developed in the 1990s. Hitting up is usually discouraged as being unnecessary with modern balls.
- Hold: The characteristic of ball motion involving a resistance to hooking, especially preventing hooking more than desired.
- House ball: A non-custom ball, generally conventional grip with polyester ("plastic") coverstock, provided by bowling facilities for temporary use by patrons.
- House shot: See Typical house shot (THS).
- Hung: A bowler is said to have been hung if he is the only one on his team who did not achieve a strike in a particular frame. Distinguish: hang.
- Hybrid reactive: A type of reactive resin ball having a coverstock designed to have the mid-lane reaction of a solid coverstock and the back end reaction of a pearl coverstock. Hybrid coverstocks generally are made from one part solid reactive material and one part pearl reactive material, the parts being differently colored.

== I ==
- Ice and rug: Informal name for a lane's oil pattern, including oil ("ice") for skidding on the first two-thirds (approx.), and a non-oiled, higher-friction back end ("rug") for hooking.
- Inserts: Tubes, glued into a ball's holes and conforming to their pitch angles, that are sized and contoured to fit a bowler's fingers to provide comfort and enhance release action.

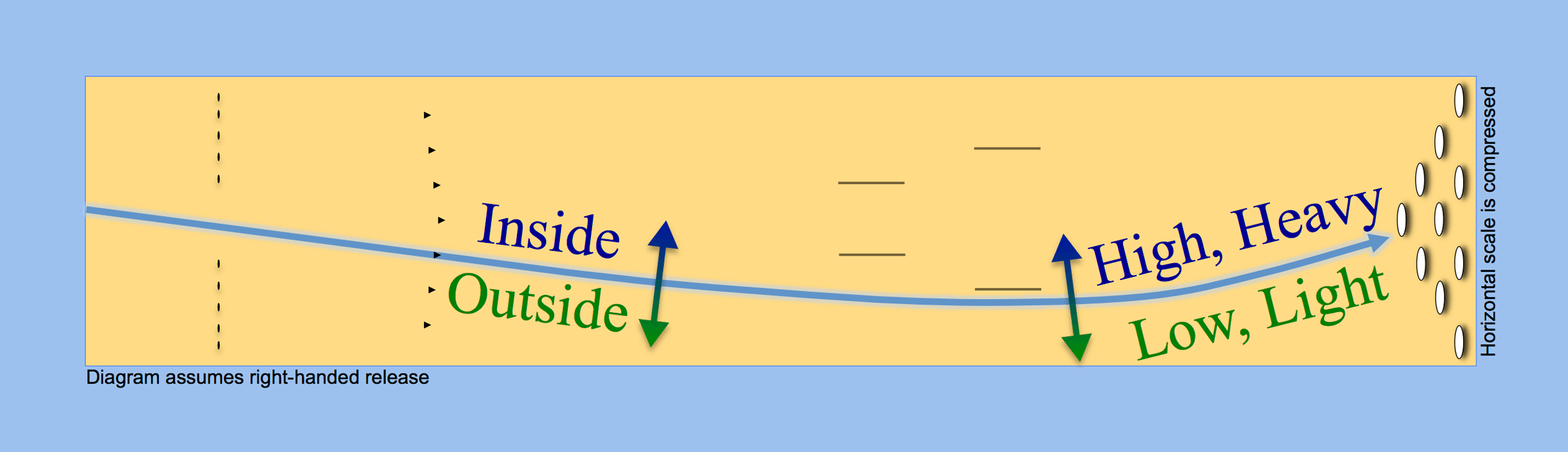
Terms describing deviations from an ideal bowling ball path

- Inside: The portion of the lane further to the left (for right-handed releases), often expressed in comparison to a previous ball path. As lanes transition, bowlers typically "move inside" or "move deeper" and roll the ball inside the previous path. Distinguish: high and heavy, which usually connote where the ball impacts the pins. Opposite of outside.

== K ==
- Kickback(s): Side wall(s) beside the gutters that enclose the pin deck and support the pinsetter. Pins that strike the kickback can bounce back onto the pin deck to become messengers. Also called sideboard(s).
- Kickback plates: Plates that cover the kickback, against which pins bounce during pin scatter.
- Killer shot: A conversion of a difficult split.
- Kingpin: The (centrally positioned) 5 pin.

== L ==
- Lag: An advanced delivery technique that involves cupping the wrist and bending the elbow on the downswing, so that the hand gets under the ball to allow the fingers to increase rev rate and power upon release.
- Lateral movement: See and compare: drift.
- Label: Usually refers to labeling on bowling pins, including manufacturer logo and USBC certification.
- Lane shine: A partial misnomer, lane shine is the change in the surface of bowling balls due to contact not only with oil from the lane, but also the pit, carpet area, elevator and return system. Lane shine affects the entire ball surface, not only the track. Over time, lane shine changes a ball's reaction.
- Lane transition: Incremental changes in a lane's frictional characteristics along a path that has experienced repeated ball traversals so as to change the oil pattern and its effect on subsequently-rolled balls, a process that involves one or both of breakdown and carry-down.
- Late timing: Timing characteristic of a delivery in which the ball is released after the sliding foot slides. Compare: early timing.
- Launch angle: See delivery angle.

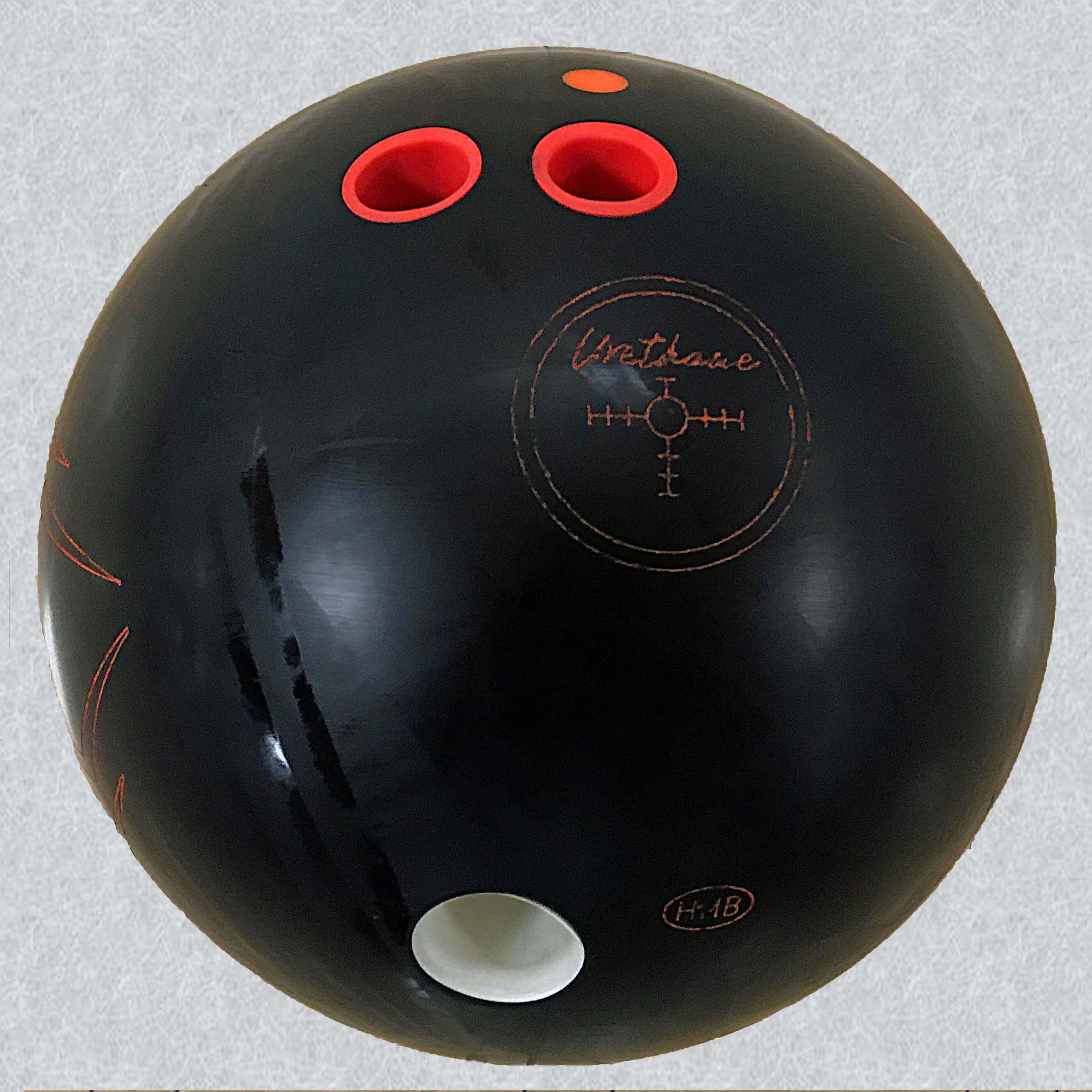
A ball with a pin up layout (red "pin" is above finger holes)

- Layout: The plan of how a bowling ball's holes, pin and mass bias indicator are located relative to each other. A pin up layout has the pin "above" the finger holes (further from the thumb hole than the finger holes), whereas a pin down layout has the pin between the finger holes and thumb hole. See Bowling ball#Layout and grip and Bowling ball#Effect of coverstock, core and layout on ball motion. Layout is also a term referring to the oil pattern used on a lane surface.
- League: An organized group of bowling teams that compete against each other according to rules and a schedule. Leagues may be certified by a national governing body. See bowling league.
- Leave: (Noun, verb) The pins left standing after the first roll of a frame. Example: "a 10-pin leave".
- Length: (1) The distance—sometimes called skid distance—between the foul line and the point at which a ball enters the hook phase at the breakpoint. Length depends on the oil pattern, the ball's surface texture (coverstock) and mass distribution (RG), and the bowler's delivery technique. (2) "Length" also describes an oil pattern itself, in terms of the furthest distance past the foul line on which oil is applied, as in "a 39-foot pattern". Distinguish: volume, which indicates the total volume of oil applied to the lane (usually expressed in milliliters).
- Let up: To roll a ball with a delivery speed that is slower, usually said in comparison to the speed of a preceding delivery or of an ideal or desired delivery.
- Light: See low. Opposite of heavy.
- Line (or staying on line, holding the line): A ball's intended or actual path down the lane, especially the substantially straight path from the foul line to the breakpoint. Staying on line and holding the line mean the ball successfully follows the intended path. Line can also mean one game—one "line" on a scoresheet.

E. J. Tackett lofts the ball over the left gutter.

- Line up, lining up: See alignment.
- Lineage: The fee paid by bowlers to a bowling center for games ("lines") played. The term is usually applied in league or tournament play to distinguish from fees paid into an award fund or prize fund that is later passed on to bowlers or teams who bowl higher scores.
- Llama: Four consecutive strikes within a single game. More common: 4-bagger. Informal: hambone.
- Loft: (verb, noun) A rolled ball's path through the air before contacting the lane surface; also, the distance traveled on such a roll. Loft can be "hand loft" (releasing the ball later in the forward swing) or "projection loft" (determined by height of the ball over the approach at the time of release).
- Long (pattern) or Long (oil): An oil pattern that has oil distributed a relatively long distance beyond the foul line (example: 42–45 feet). Long is sometimes applied to a roll in which the ball skids longer than desired or expected, before entering the hook phase: for example, "That ball went long."
- Love tap: A light pocket hit causing (for a right-handed release) the 6-pin to fall into the channel, pop back up and "tap" the 10-pin to knock it down. Distinguish: the flat 10 leave.
- Low: Adjective describing shots that impact the pins undesirably outside from center pocket. Opposite of high.

== M ==
Bowlers are said to be matched up when they optimize their release ratio—ratio of a ball's speed and rev rate at time of release—so that the ball achieves full traction immediately before contacting the pins to maximize the useful energy of impact.

- Major: One of five PBA tournaments that are considered the most important for a bowler to win. They are - The USBC Masters, The PBA World Championship, The Tournament of Champions, The U.S. Open, and The PBA Players Championship.
- Man weight: An individual is said to be "rolling man weight" when they are rolling sixteen-pound bowling balls, the heaviest allowed weight.
- Mark: (Noun, verb) A spare or a strike, as distinguished from an open frame. Mark (noun) also refers to a bowler's sighting target on the lane, which is often one of the arrows located about 15 feet past the foul line (usage: "he missed his mark by one board right").
- Mass bias indicator or Mass bias marker: A marker indicating the part of the ball at which the core is closest to the coverstock exterior. Its location in the layout affects the shape of the ball's reaction, especially on the back end.
- Match play or Match rounds: Refers to what is usually the intermediate stage of a tournament, in which entrants compete, generally in head-to-head matches, to determine seeding for the final rounds.
- Match(ing) up: To optimize one's release ratio. More specifically, matching up means to control a ball's forward speed and its rev rate at time of release, so that the ball achieves full traction immediately before striking the pins, thereby maximizing energy imparted to the pins.
- Meg:^{[Questionable]} A roll knocking down only the 7-pin or 10-pin.
- Messenger: A pin (generally the headpin) that travels laterally across the pin deck, usually after deflecting off a side wall (kickback), to knock down another pin (usually an opposite corner pin); more generally applied to a pin that knocks down other pin(s) "late" to result in a strike. Also known as a bird dog, scout, shrapnel, rogue pin, or more recently, farkel.
- Middle finger: A roll leaving only the 5-pin.
- The midlane or The mids: The part of the lane between the heads and the back end.
- Mixer: A roll that causes the pins to bounce around extensively ("mix"), possibly reflecting off side wall(s); term usually distinguishes from a roll in which all pins are quickly and decisively knocked into the pit.
- Move (your feet): In the stance before a delivery, to stand in a different place on the approach. Standing in a different spot causes a change in trajectory of the ball as it moves toward the target (usually an arrow), and is often performed to adapt to changing lane conditions.

== N ==
- Negative axis point: The opposite end of the axis of rotation as the PAP (positive axis point).
- No-tap: An alternative method of scoring in which, if a given number of pins (less than ten) are knocked down on the first roll, the frame is still scored as a strike. Example: under "nine pin no-tap" scoring, knocking down only nine pins would be scored as a strike.
- Nine-call: In Japan, a phrase used to describe an announcement over the PA system, to alert other bowlers and spectators in the establishment that a potential perfect game is about to happen. The announcement is made right before the bowler starts the 10th frame.
- (on the) Nose: A ball that hits the middle of the 1-pin rather than the pocket is said to be "on the nose".

== O ==
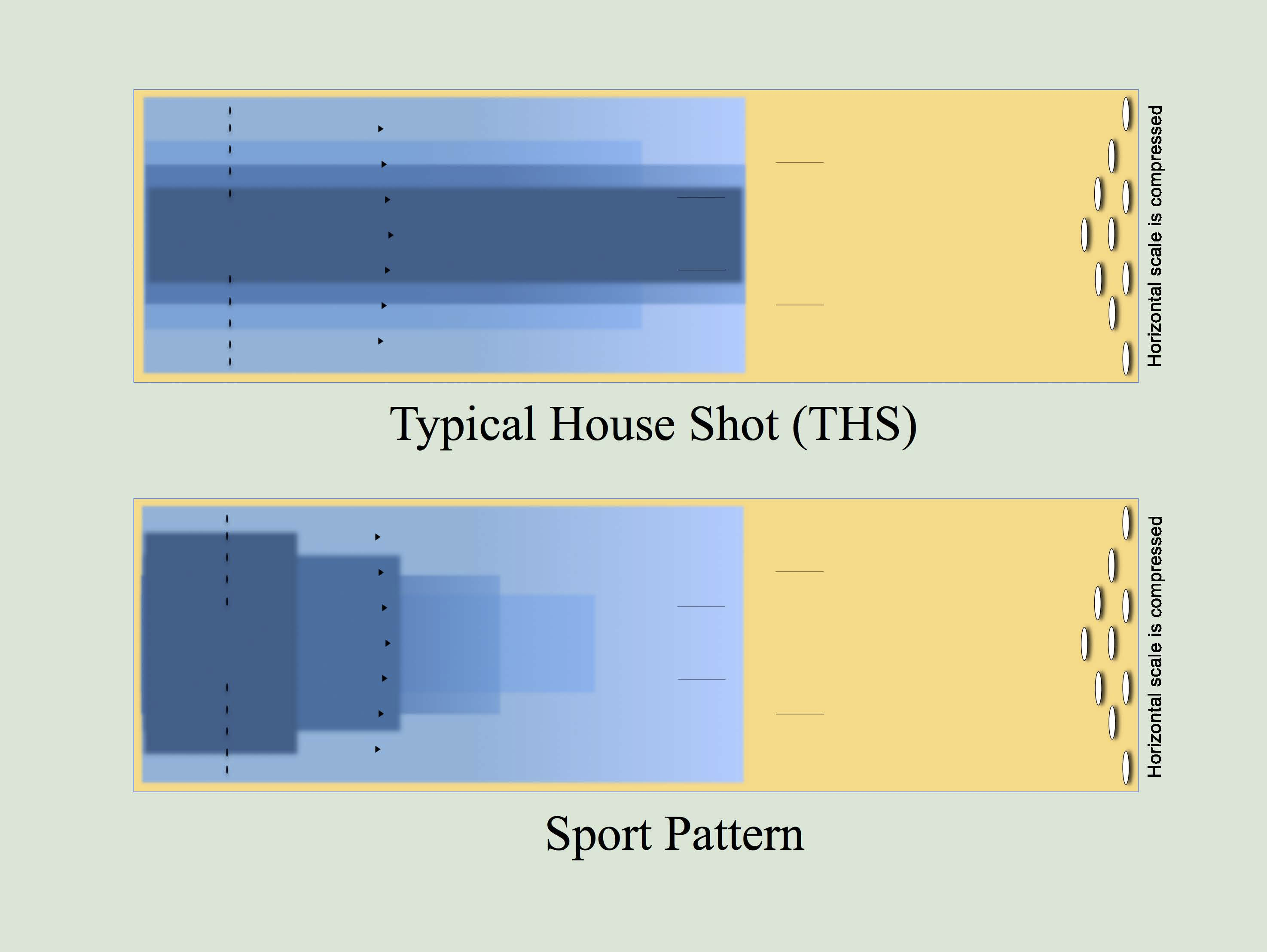
Conceptual diagrams of two oil patterns (typical house shot, and sport pattern)
(Horizontal scale is compressed)

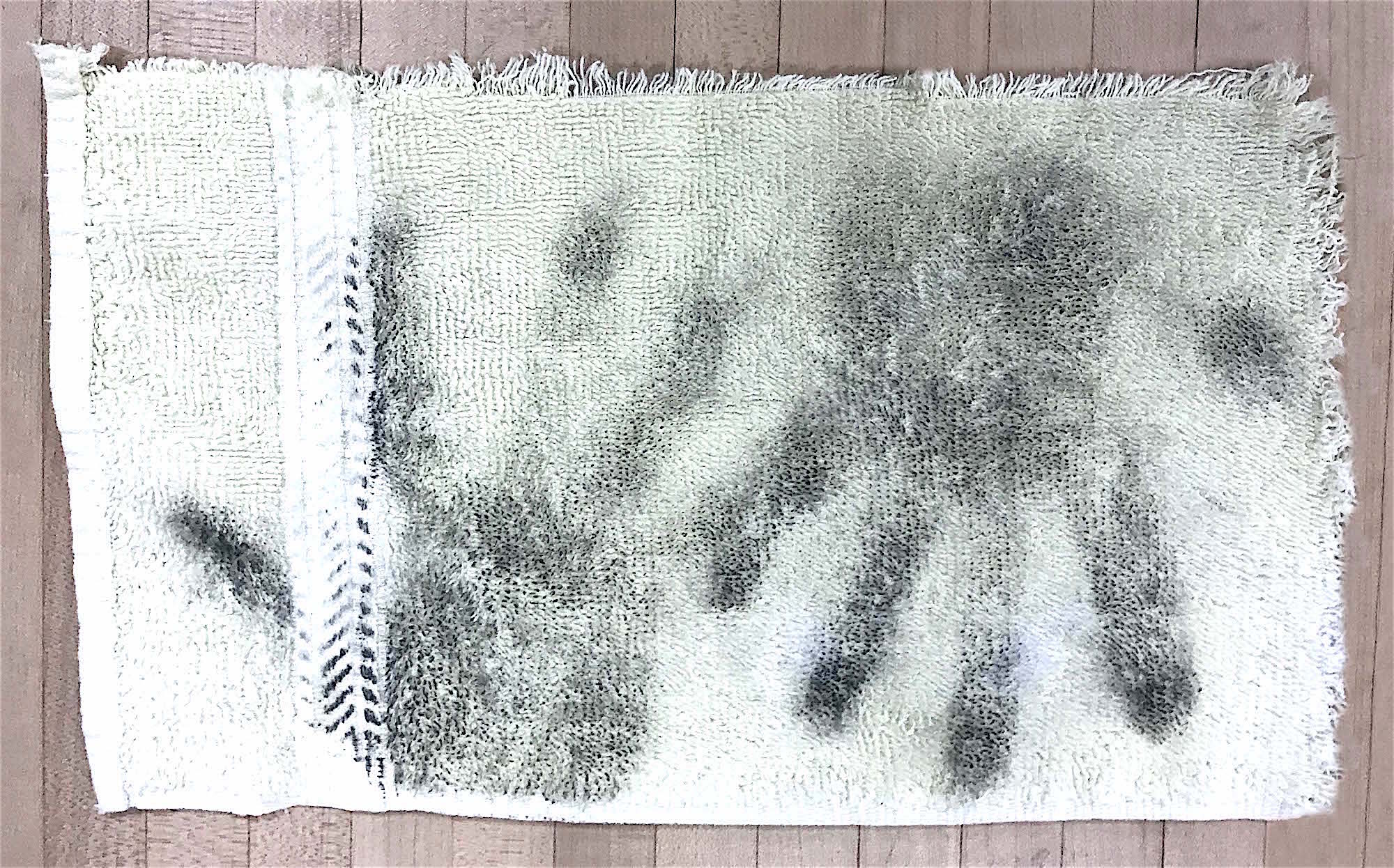
Accumulated oil clogs the pores of reactive resin balls, reducing their frictional characteristics. Shown: lane oil and dirt removed from a reactive ball after twelve games.

- Oil: The lane conditioner—today predominantly mineral oil to enhance lubrication—applied to the front two-thirds (approximately) of the lane. Earlier lane conditioners were solvent-based, to break down dirt and aid in lane cleaning. About 18 and 25 milliliters (mL) of oil are applied on typical house shots, and sport patterns receive from 15 mL to 30 mL depending on the complexity and length of the pattern.
- Oil pattern: Quantitative pattern of distribution of oil on the lane, having a major effect on ball motion. Oil patterns are given names (example: animal patterns such as "Scorpion", tournament patterns such as "U.S. Open", or legend patterns such as "Dick Weber 45"); also, "pattern" is sometimes used to particularly characterize a pattern's length (example: in "a 39-foot pattern", oil is applied only in the first 39 feet past the foul line). See typical house shot and sport pattern.
- Oil ratio: The ratio of oil concentration at the center of the lane to oil concentration near the outer edges of the lane. Typical house shots generally have oil ratios much higher than those of sport shots.
- Open (body position, esp. open shoulders): Describes a body position in which the torso is directed substantially to the outside and not facing squarely downlane; often adopted by crankers as enabling extra power as the torso rotates from open to closed position during delivery. Compare: closed (body position).
- Open bowling: Term applied in bowling centers to denote unstructured practice sessions or fun times, as distinguished from league or tournament play.
- Open frame: A frame in which neither a strike nor spare is achieved.
- Open (the lane) or open (one's angles): The process by which bowlers adjust their feet's starting position and target further inside^{(further left, for a right-handed release)} as a session progresses, so as to keep the ball to the left of the relatively dry area caused by oil breakdown in previous frames. The leftward migration of ball paths enlarges the area—figuratively called the "wall"—near the breakpoint that is favorable for guiding balls toward the pocket. Typically, bowlers "move their feet" a greater number of boards than their target, so the ball traverses more boards laterally after the move.
- Out of range: describes a pin that has been moved off its proper spot far enough that the pinsetter cannot pick it up, sometimes jamming the pinsetter and preventing the sweeping of downed pins. This occurrence often requires a technician to intervene before play can continue.

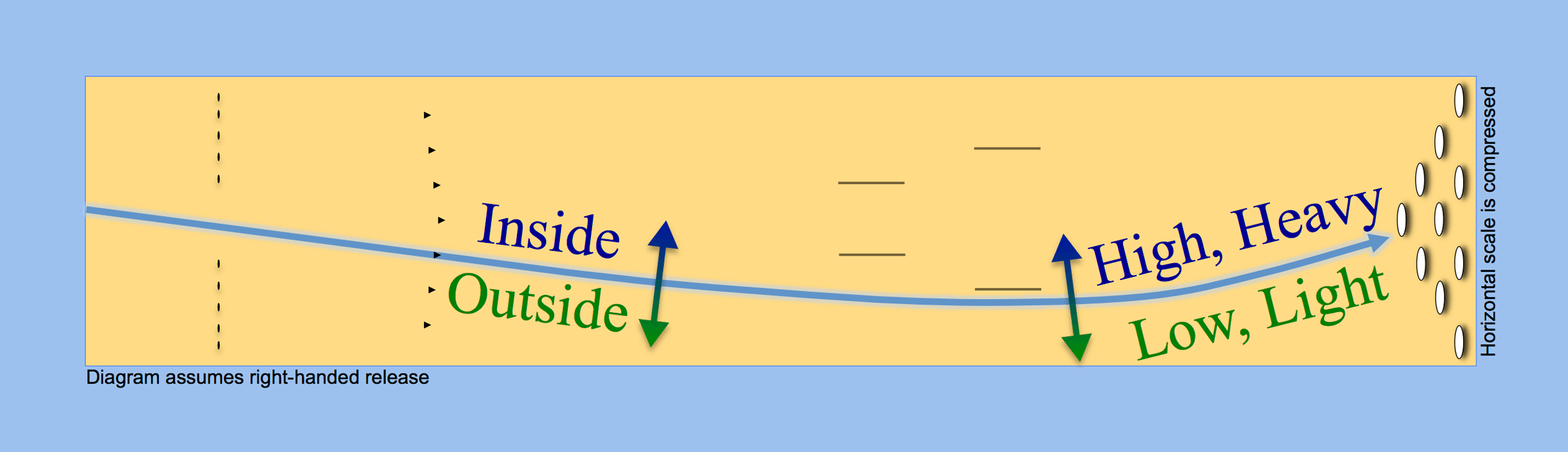
Terms describing deviations from an ideal bowling ball path

- Outside: The portion of the lane further to the right (for right-handed deliveries), often expressed in comparison to a previous ball path. Typically, bowlers "move outside" to obtain a greater angle of entry to the pins without requiring a large hook. Distinguish: light and low, which usually connote where the ball impacts the pins. Opposite of inside.
- Over/under: Sometimes called wet/dry. A phenomenon in which a first roll delivered outside a desired path encounters unexpectedly high friction and hooks excessively so as to hit the pins too high, and a second roll delivered inside the desired path encounters unexpectedly low friction and hooks inadequately so as to hit the pins too low. Over/under may be caused by steep ("cliff") oil patterns on a "blocked" lane, in which the difference in oil concentrations between the center boards and the outer boards is large. Such a condition is often encountered on the United States Bowling Congress (USBC) Red Pattern. Over/under may also be caused by extreme lane topology.
- Overlay: A type of lane surface in which a film is applied to a wood surface, protecting it while preserving some of the characteristics of a traditional wood surface.

== P ==
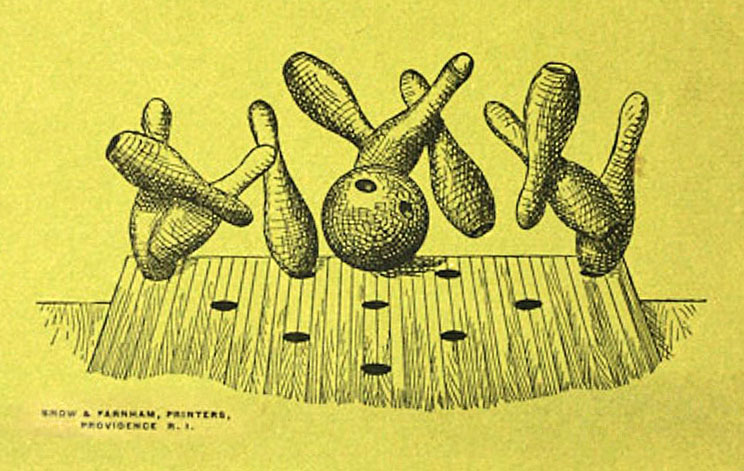
An 1895 artistic portrayal of pin scatter with a two-hole bowling ball of the era

Ideal pin scatter: Ball contacts the 1, 3, 5 and 9 pins (sequentially tinted red) to achieve what some call a perfect strike.

The number of sanctioned perfect games per league bowler has increased substantially since the 1990s. Freeman and Hatfield posit that the increase in perfect games is due to factors such as the introduction of reactive resin coverstocks, asymmetric ball cores, synthetic lane surfaces, and precision lane oiling machines.

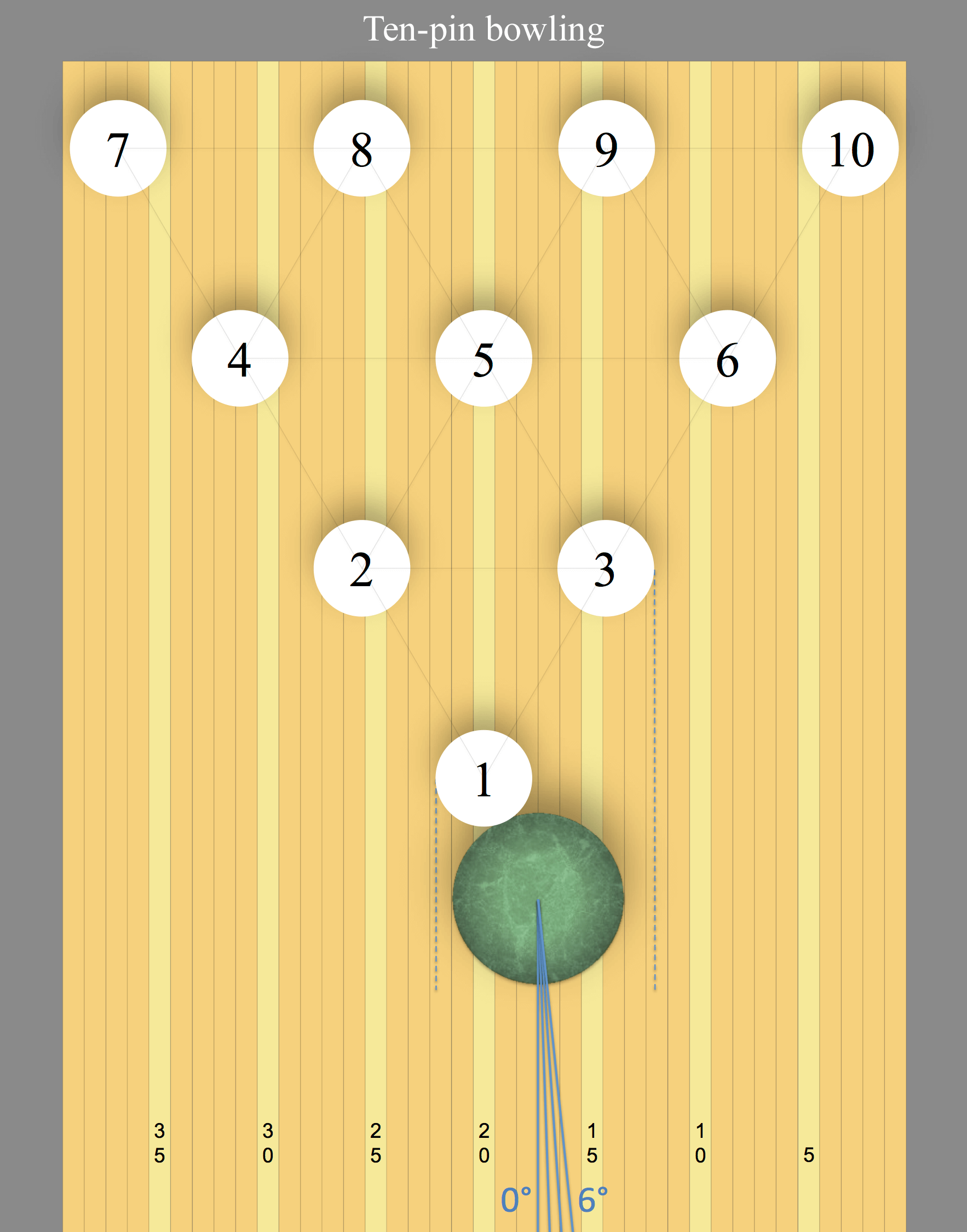
"Perfect strike": ball impacts the pocket at "board 17.5"—found by a USBC pin-carry study to maximize strike probability.

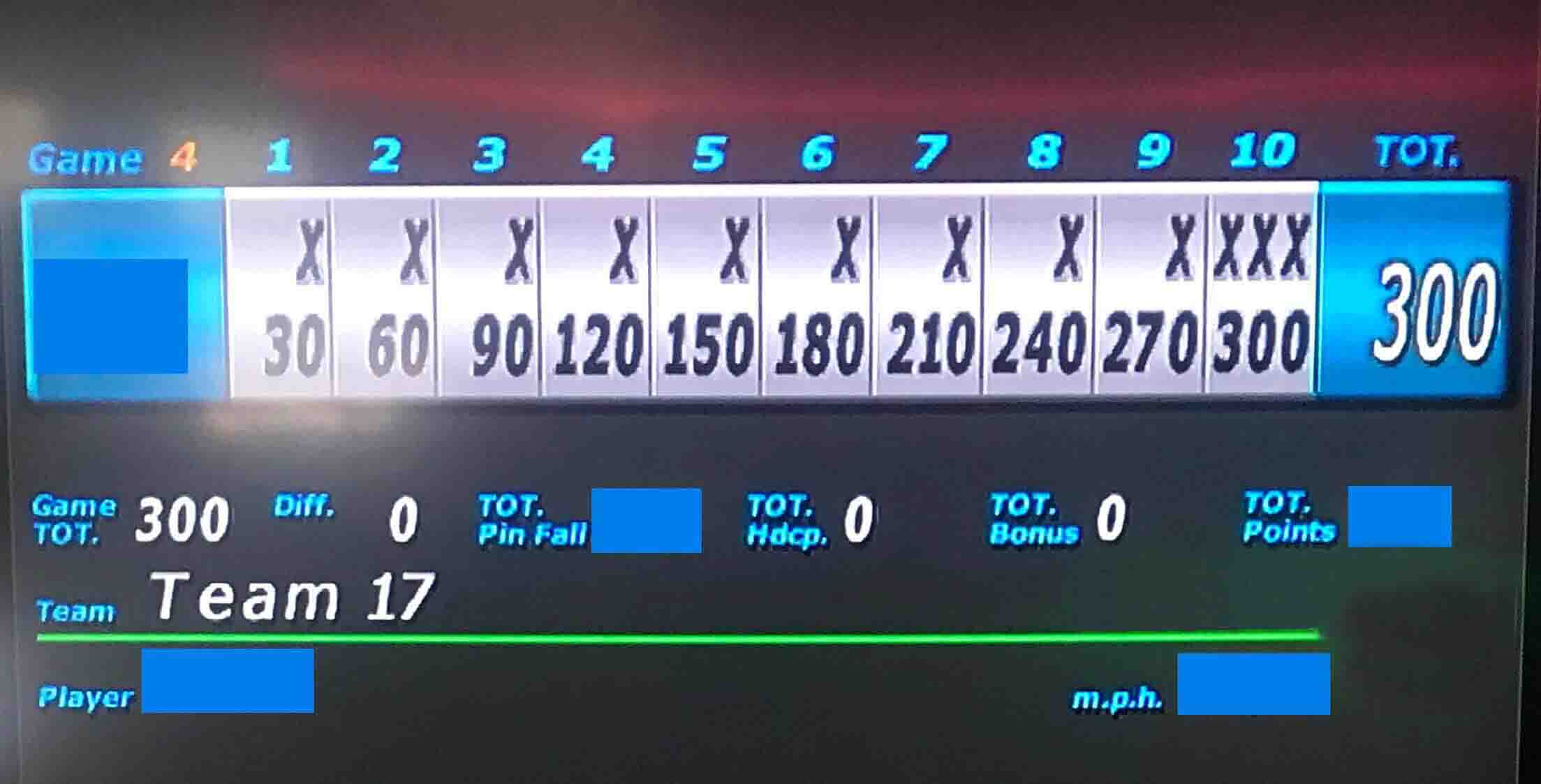
A "perfect" 300 score: twelve consecutive strikes in the same game

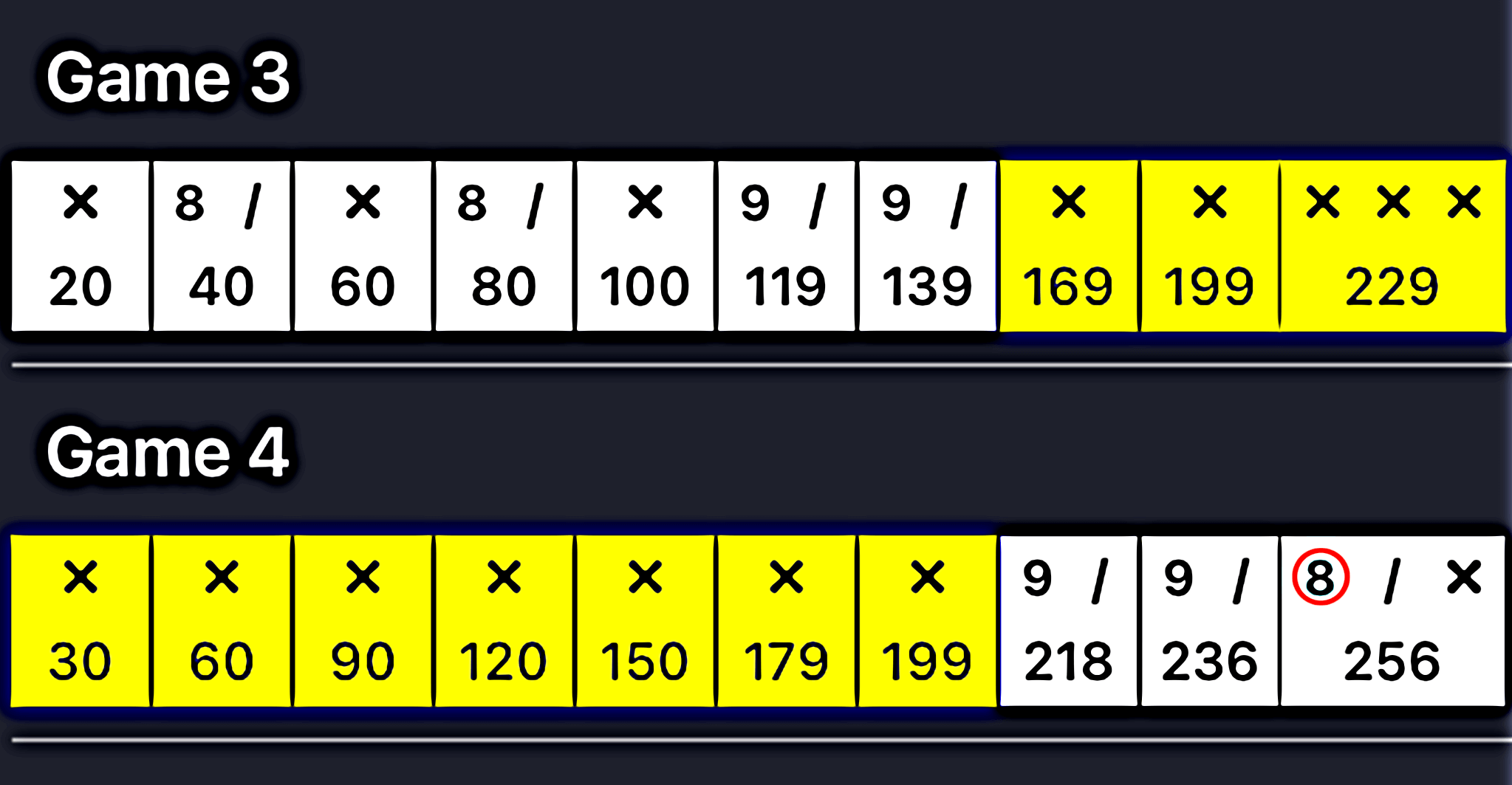
An "Andy Varipapa 300" (highlighted in yellow) split between two games

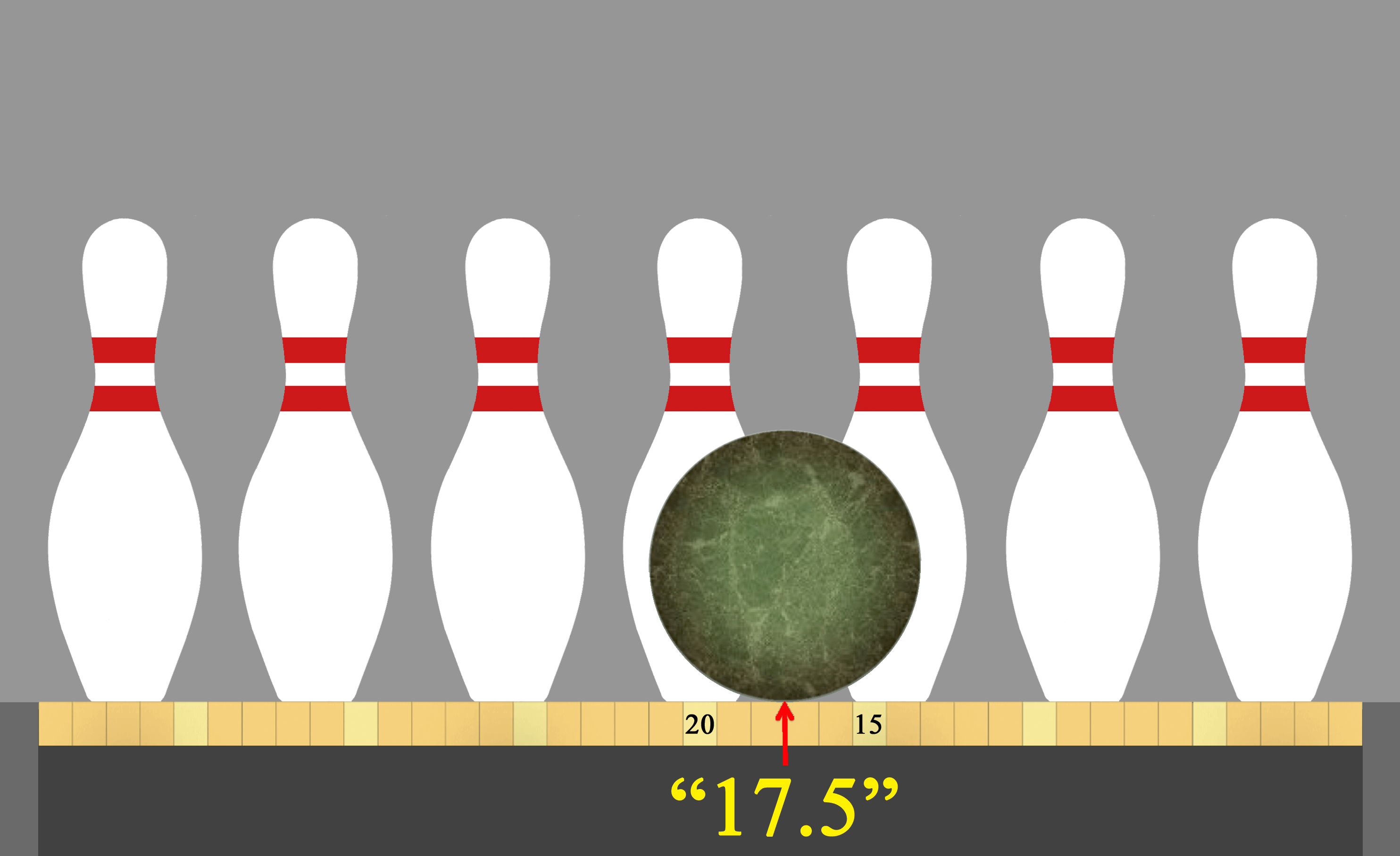
Front view: ball impacts the pocket at "board 17.5"—found by a USBC pin-carry study to maximize strike probability. The ideal impact point is closer to the center of the head pin than most people think.

A USBC pin carry study found "board 17.5" to be the ideal pocket location to achieve a strike, with higher entry angles (shown) and heavier balls (not graphed) generally providing greater chances of striking.

The pitch (angle) at which thumb and finger holes are drilled−either forward or reverse—helps to regulate how a ball is released. Lateral pitch angles (perpendicular to this diagram) are also custom fit.

- PAP: Abbreviation for positive axis point. The pocket-side end of a ball's initial axis of rotation, used by pro shop operators to strategically determine where to drill holes for the ball's layout.
- Par: A scratch score of 200.
- Pair: Two adjacent lanes that share a common ball return.
- Paralyzer:^{[Questionable]} A pin knocked down that stands up again, one that skids while standing or one that gets hit on opposite sides by the ball and/or other pin(s) and somehow does not go down.
- Pattern: See oil pattern.
- Payout ratio: see prize ratio.
- PBA: Professional Bowlers Association, the international sanctioning body for professional bowlers, formed in 1958.
- PBA 4:^{[Questionable]} The 3-4-6-7-9-10 split (or 2-4-6-7-8-10 for left-handed release).
- Pearl reactive: A type of reactive resin ball in which the coverstock has resin or mica particles that roughen the coverstock's microscopic pores to extend the skid length and hook more decisively than solid reactive balls when reaching the dry part of the lane.
- Perfect game: A game of twelve consecutive strikes in a single game (score: 300). The humorously named "Andy Varipapa 300" involves twelve consecutive strikes spread between two consecutive games.
- Perfect strike: A strike in which the ball hits only the 1, 3, 5 and 9 pins on a right-handed release or the 1, 2, 5 and 8 pins on a left-handed release.
- Petraglia Scoring System: Developed by PBA and USBC Hall of Famer Johnny Petraglia, the system is based on the number of rolls it takes to knock down all ten pins in a frame. Thus, a strike is scored as 1, a spare is scored as 2, with more numbers added in increments of 1 if additional rolls are required to clear ten pins. Lowest score wins. There are no bonus rolls in the tenth frame, so a perfect game score is 10.
- Pick up (a spare): To convert a spare. Pick up is also used to describe how a ball increases its change in direction while hooking, as in "the ball picked up too far down the lane".
- Pin (element of bowling ball): A usually cylindrical, polyester or urethane stem extending from the top of the core (weight block) to the ball's cover, seen as a colored dot that is used as a reference point for drilling the ball (see pin up and pin down). The pin, also called pin locator, holds the core in place as the coverstock is poured into the ball mold during manufacture.
- Pin action: See pin scatter.
- Pin carry: The process by which pins are knocked down by direct ball impact and pin scatter. Pin carry is affected by factors including angle of entry, point of entry, ball weight, pin spotting variation, and construction of the pin deck, kickbacks (sideboards), and gutters. Pin carry is quantified by pin count.
- Pin chaser: Colloquial name for a bowling center's mechanic.
- Pin count: The number of pins knocked down on a given roll, usually referring to the first roll of a frame. Pin count is particularly important after mark(s) in prior frame(s), because the scoring effect of first-roll-of-a-frame pin count is doubled following a spare or single strike, and tripled following two consecutive strikes. Often shortened to count.
- Pin deck: Area of the lane on which the pins stand, immediately in front of the pit.
- Pin down: See layout.
- Pin scatter: The process by which pins interact and potentially knock each other down, usually distinguished from being knocked down directly by ball impact. Also called pin action. Pin scatter affects pin carry.
- Pin up: See layout.
- Pit: The region, behind the pin deck, that collects downed or swept pins.
- Pitch: Angle and direction at which finger holes and thumb holes are drilled. Pitch affects release characteristics.
- Pivot step: See power step.
- Plastic: See polyester.
- Pocket: The ideal place for the ball to hit the pins in order to maximize strike probability. According to a USBC Pin Carry Survey completed in 2008, a ball ideally hits the head pin while centered 2.5 boards from the center of the head pin, on "board 17.5".
- Point up: To play the lane by angling the ball from the gutter toward the pocket with more of a straight shot than hook. Distinguish: Down and in.
- Polyester: Proper name of "plastic", usually describing ball coverstocks. Polyester (plastic) balls are often chosen as straight balls.
- Polyurethane: Proper name of "urethane", describing ball coverstocks.
- Position round: A league session in which teams that are adjacent each other in the standings are paired to bowl against each other (#1 ranked vs. #2 ranked; #3 vs. #4, etc.). Also: such a pairing of bowlers in (usually) the last round of tournament match play, whose outcome will determine seeding for the subsequent (final or championship) rounds.
- Positive axis point: See PAP.
- Post (a shot): To maintain a stationary, stable, balanced position until well after the end of a delivery, a practice thought to improve consistency of delivery through critical observation of the ball's motion. Opposite of rearing up and falling off (a shot).
- Post-bowl and pre-bowl: To bowl a league game after or before scheduled league time; rules vary as to availability of honor awards, and as to requirements for official witnessing and bowling opposite an opposing team.
- Power step: The second-to-last step in a bowler's delivery, usually timed to a peak of the backswing and immediately preceding the slide step. The power step is also called the pivot step.
- Power stroker: A bowler who combines a cranker's emphasis on power with a stroker's emphasis on control. Similar to "tweener".
- Preferred spin axis (PSA): The axis to which a ball's axis of rotation will migrate after having been rolled with an initial spin axis. The migration is caused by dynamic imbalances in the ball's internal structure (core design and orientation).
- Pre-shot routine: A predetermined, ordered sequence of mental and/or physical steps practiced immediately before beginning a delivery, in an effort to increase consistency.
- Prize ratio: Ratio (fraction) designated in competition rules as the number of competition entrants who will be awarded prizes, divided by the total number of competitors. Example: "1:6 prize ratio" means that one of six entrants will be awarded a prize. Also called payout ratio.
- Projection: See skid.
- PTQ: Acronym for Pre-Tournament Qualifier. In professional play, it is the initial stage of a tournament where non-exempt players bowl a set number of games to gain one of the few open spots in the official starting field. Also known as the "rabbit squad".
- Push off or push away: The initial forward movement of the ball from the stable setup position, and preceding the backswing.
- PWBA: The Professional Women's Bowling Association (1960—2003; 2015— ) organizes professional women's bowling events.

== Q ==
- Qualifying (rounds): The initial stage of a tournament, in which the broadest field of competitors compete to determine who will proceed to the next stage, which is usually the match rounds.

== R ==
Conceptual illustration of ball speed and rev rate during the skid and hook phases, until they converge upon entering the roll phase. The initial ratio of ball speed to rev rate—the ratio at the time of release—is called the release ratio. Rev rate increases (motion of yellow arrowheads) until it matches the decreasing ball speed upon entering the roll phase.

- Ra: Roughness average. See Roughness for explanation.
- Rack: A full set of ten pins, either in the pinsetter or after being placed onto the pin deck.
- Radius of gyration (RG): A specification of the degree to which a ball's core is "center heavy" (minimum RG value=2.46, favoring shorter length) or "cover heavy" (maximum RG value=2.80, favoring greater length). In technical terms, the USBC defines the RG as a measurement, in inches, of the distance from the axis of rotation at which the total mass of a body might be concentrated without changing its moment of inertia. See Bowling ball#Effect of coverstock, core and layout on ball motion.
- Rail: The 1–2–4–7 or 1–3–6–10 pins; also called a "picket fence". Spinners "ride the rail" after deflecting from the 1-pin.
- Range: See Out of range.
- Rangefinders: See downlane markers.
- Ratio: A broad mathematical term denoting a quotient of two entities. In bowling, see oil ratio (describing a lane's oil pattern) and release ratio (a characteristic of a bowler's ball release).
- Reaction: See ball reaction.
- Reactive resin (often shortened to reactive): A coverstock composition in which polyurethane is enhanced with microscopic pores and/or additives to increase frictional engagement with the lane, to increase hook potential. Reactive technology includes solid reactive, pearl reactive, or hybrid reactive coverstocks.
- Read the lane: To watch precisely where on the lane the ball transitions from skid phase to hook phase and to roll phase. Reading the lane allows a bowler more strategic alignment and adjustment decisions for subsequent rolls. Separately, a bowling ball itself is said to "read the lane" when, after skidding, it begins to react to lane friction by changing direction and slowing down.
- Rear(ing) up: To straighten the legs during and immediately after the release of the ball, raising the torso to a higher position. Rearing up is generally disfavored by bowling instructors as it is thought to compromise good balance and decrease consistency. Distinguish: posting the shot, which involves retaining the body in a stable and balanced position for a substantial time after releasing the ball.
- Red pattern: A USBC oil pattern sometimes described in relation to an over/under condition, which involves heavy oil concentrations around the center of the lane, but much drier oil concentrations further to the outside.
- Release: The final stage of the delivery (occurring after the approach) in which the ball leaves the bowler's hand.
- Release ratio: The ratio of a ball's forward (translational) speed to its rev rate (rotational speed) at time of release. This ratio continually decreases throughout the ball's travel until it reaches exactly 1.0 when full traction is achieved upon entering the roll phase. See Bowling ball#Ball motion.
- Resurface: To apply a sequence of one or more abrasive pads to a ball's coverstock to achieve a chosen surface roughness, to achieve desired frictional characteristics for controlling ball motion. See Abralon, Siaair.
- Rejuvenator: See Revivor.
- Re-rack: Placement of a new set of pins ("rack)" onto the pin deck; often performed if an earlier set had a pin off its mark, or as a tactical delay in a competitive match.
- Rev-dominant: Adjective describing a release with a too-low release ratio, in which the ratio of ball speed to rev rate is too low, causing the ball to enter the roll phase before reaching the pins, wasting power that would otherwise be imparted to the pins. Opposite of speed-dominant.
- Rev rate: (Informal) A ball's rotational speed, substantially affecting hook; usually expressed in revolutions per minute (RPM).
- Revivor: A device for removing oil from bowling balls by applying air heated to a controlled temperature. When bowling ball surfaces are heated to a temperature of about 130 °F (54 °C), the balls' pores expand slightly through thermal expansion, and the oil expands more, so that the oil escapes to the surface where it can be wiped off.
- Rev rate optimization score (ROS): A measure of the quotient of rev rate to ball speed, expressed in revolutions per minute divided by miles per hour, or RPM/MPH. Bowlers are usually considered to be rev-dominant if they have an ROS over 25, and speed-dominant bowlers are usually thought to have an ROS under 20. Those with ROSs from 20 to 25 are called balanced bowlers. Distinguish: release ratio.
- RG: Abbreviation of radius of gyration.
- RG differential: See differential of RG.
- Ride the lightning: (Informal) To roll a ball close to the gutter.
- Ringing 10: A leave of the 10-pin, in which the 6-pin flies around the 10-pin to the outside and enters the pit (compare: flat 10). Also called "solid 10" or "wrap 10". Left-handed release equivalent: "Ringing 7".
- Rogue pin: See messenger.
- Roll: The third phase of ball motion, in which the ball gains full traction upon leaving the hook phase.
- Roll finger: The middle finger, so named because when positioned directly behind the ball at delivery, applies forward roll to the ball and causes low axis tilt. Compare: turn finger.

The so-called "Rule of 31"—actually an informal guideline—calculates the approximate board on which a ball should exit a particular oil pattern based on the length of the pattern, in order to achieve a strike.

- Roll-out: Progression from the hook phase into the roll phase of ball motion. Commonly, the term connotes undesirably early entry into the roll phase, distinguished from optimally entering the roll phase immediately before reaching the pins: early roll-out wastes power to lane friction. See release ratio.
- ROS: See Rev rate optimization score.
- Rotation: See axis rotation.
- Roughness: A measure of the microscopic peak-and-valley surface deviation characteristics of ball coverstocks. Roughness is often expressed in terms of Roughness Average (Ra) and Roughness Surface (Rs), which are expressed in microns (μm) or microinches (μin). Ra is calculated as an average of microscopic peaks and valleys over a specific area. Rs characterizes the frequency, distribution and evenness of deviations over the ball's entire surface. Higher values of Ra and Rs characterize balls that create more friction with the lane surface and cause earlier hooking, while lower values enable longer skidding.
- Rs: Roughness Surface. See Roughness for explanation.
- Rule of 31: A rough guideline—not actually a "rule"—for estimating on which board the ball should leave the oil pattern to reach the pocket. Specifically, the formula is B=L–31. In words: board B = length L of the oil pattern in feet, minus 31. For example, if the pattern length is 40 feet, the ball should exit the pattern on the 40 — 31 = 9 board.

== S ==
Margins of error for spares

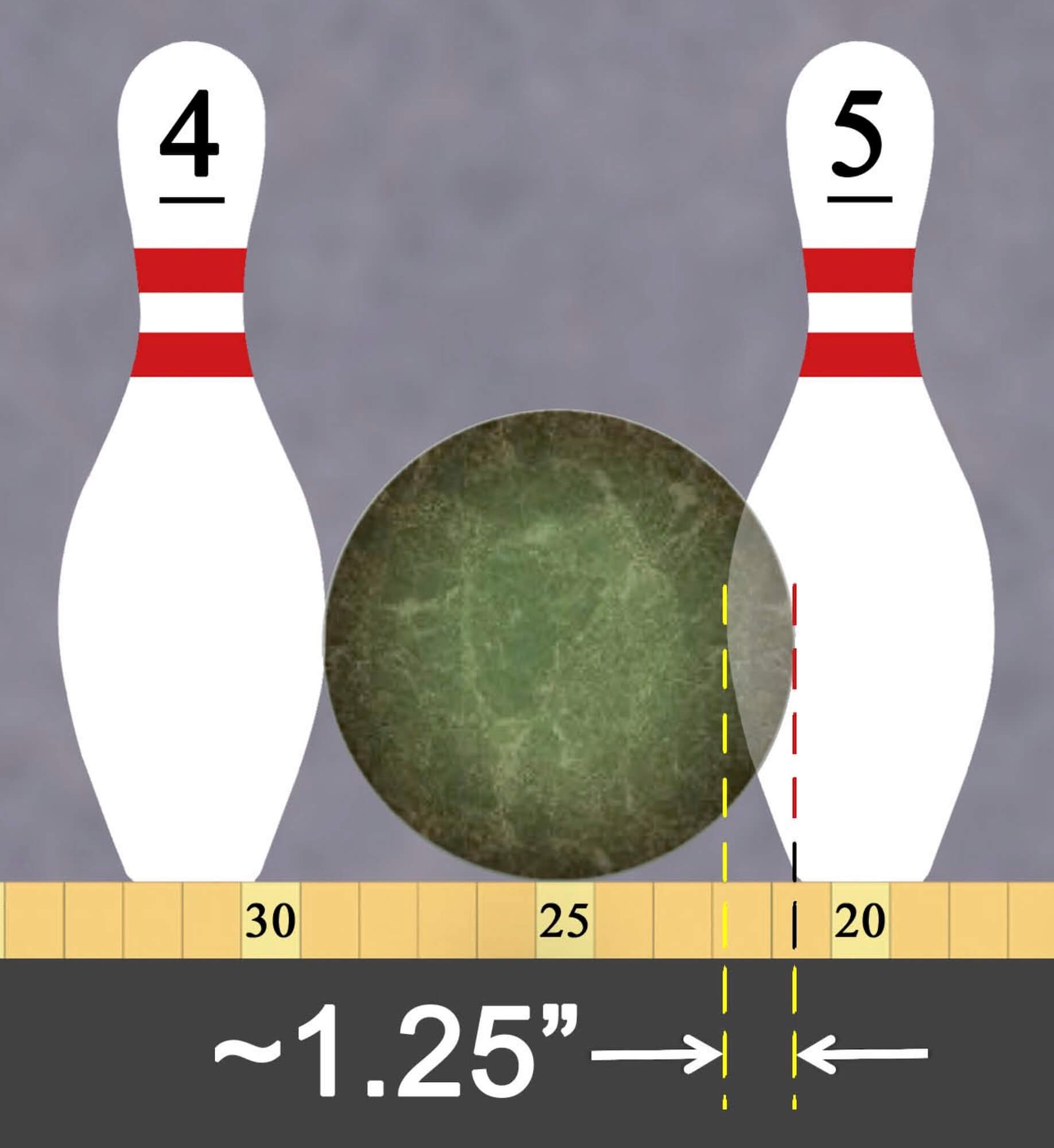
The margin for error in converting same-row splits is about 1.25 inches (3.2 cm). Using a hook (to increase entry angle) increases this figure slightly.

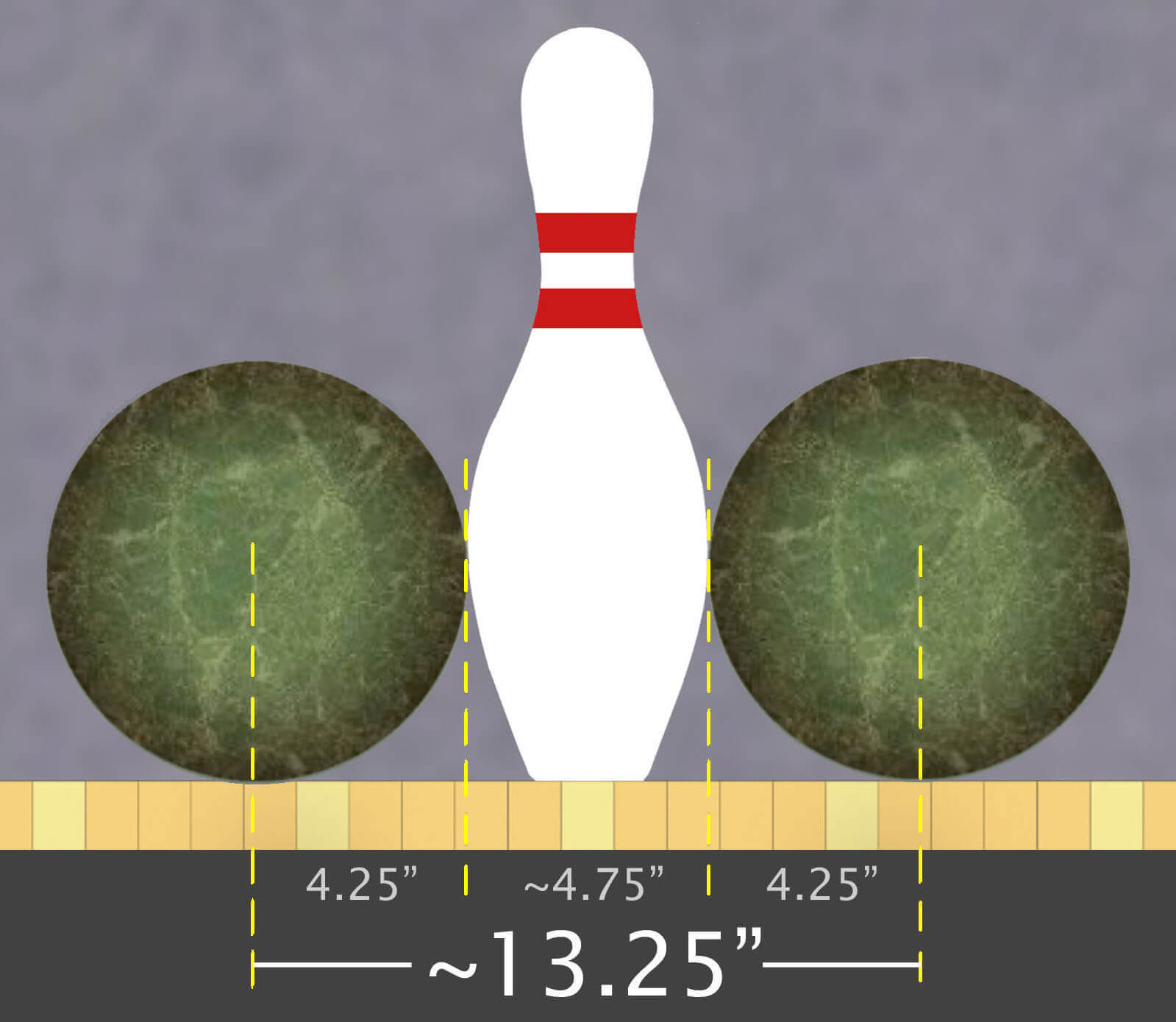
Margin for error for converting a single-pin spare: balls rolled outside a range of about 13.25 inches (33.7 cm) will miss.

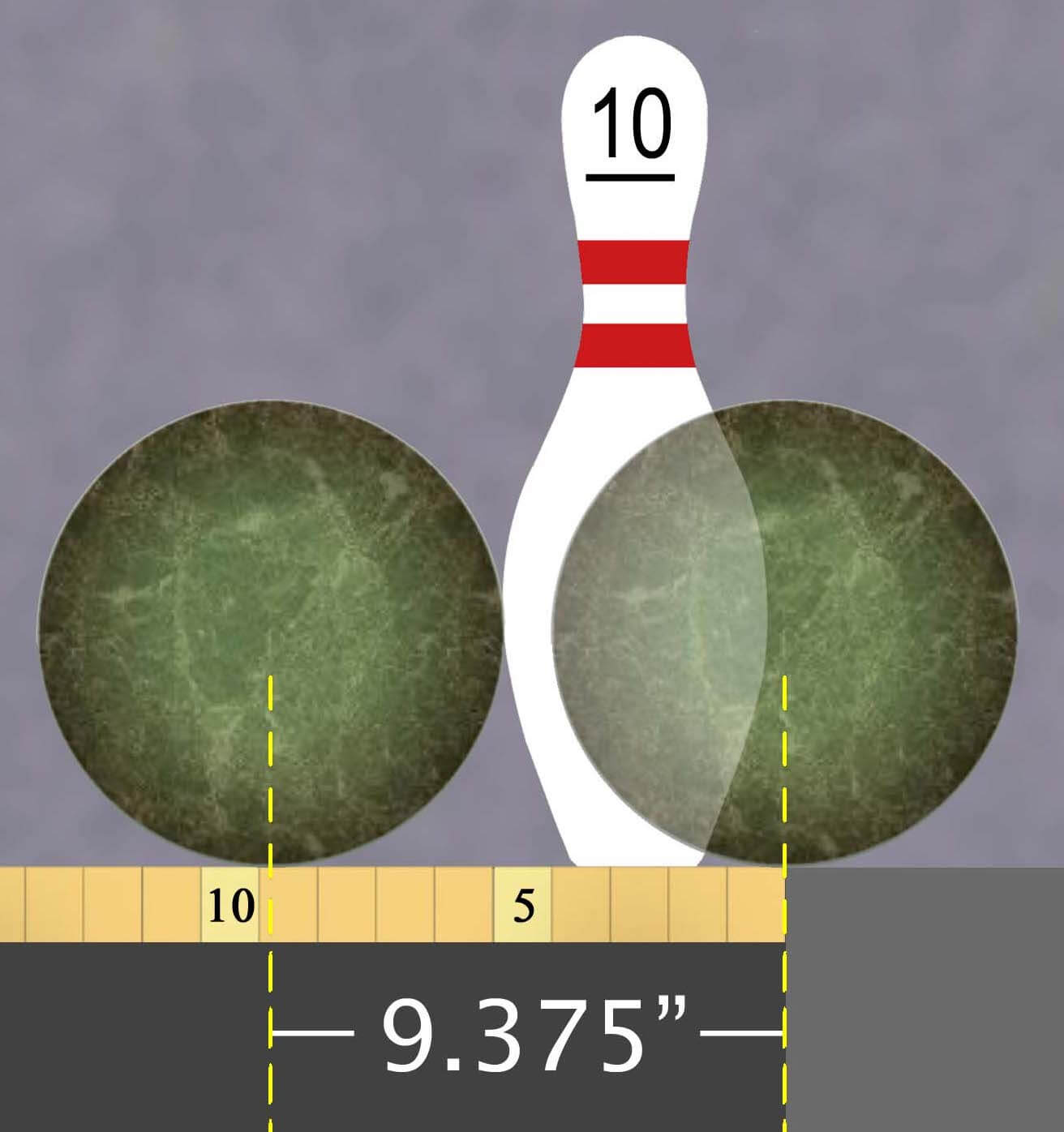
Because the 10-pin is located close to the gutter, the range of success is smaller, about 9.375 inches (23.81 cm).

Though bowling scores are generally linearly proportional to strike frequency, there is substantial variance based on whether the strikes are consecutive, and based on the number of open frames versus spares. In this dataset, such variance can approach 90 pins per set (30 pins per game), shown by the vertical extent of the shaded bar.

- Sacrificial lamb: In competitive scratch team play, a low-average bowler who is deliberately matched against a high-average bowler on the opposing team, as the team's strategy to win match-ups of the remaining players.
- Sandbagging: Intentionally bowling poorly early in a season to obtain a high handicap to apply when later bowling earnestly.
- Scout: See messenger.
- Scratch: Adjective describing scores actually achieved—without addition of a handicap.
- Series: An associated group of several (usually three consecutive) bowling games whose scores are added to determine a series score or set score.
- Set: See series.
- Setup: The still and stable position of the body from which bowlers launch their approaches. Setup encompasses knee bend, tilt from the waist, initial ball position, weight distribution and relative position of the two feet, etc., and is the time when the bowler focuses on the target. Verbal form: set up.
- Shadow bowling: Bowling without pins, especially for practice or warm-up, promoting focus on technique or ball motion rather than scoring result.
- Shape (the ball): To cause the ball to hook more to arrive in the pocket, as distinguished from following a straighter path.
- Shine: See Lane shine.
- Short pattern: An oil pattern that has oil distributed a relatively short distance beyond the foul line (example: 32–35 feet). Also called "short oil".
- Shrapnel: See messenger.
- Shred the rack: To achieve a strike in which all pins in the rack are downed quickly and decisively—the opposite of, for example, a slow mixer.
- Shut out: In competition, to score sufficient points to make it mathematically impossible for an opponent to catch up with one's own score by the end of the game.
- Siaair (pad): An abrasion technology product used to "sand" ball coverstocks with different grits (degrees of roughness) to control the amount of friction between the coverstock and lane.
- Sideboard(s): See kickback.
- Side rotation: Axis rotation.
- Sight(ing): The process of focusing one's vision and attention, usually at the arrows, primarily to promote accurate targeting and ease of visually following the ball's path, but also affecting posture and release characteristics such as ball speed, loft distance and follow-through.
- Six-pack: Six consecutive strikes in a single game.
- Skid: The first phase of ball motion, in which the ball travels a substantially straight path until reaching the breakpoint to enter the hook phase. Skid distance—also called length—is influenced by a bowler's projection of the ball, and depends on oil pattern, ball surface, and delivery technique.
- Skid/flip or Skid/snap: Adjective applied to balls or ball motion, in which the ball conserves energy in a long skid phase, and releases the energy by curving sharply far down-lane in the hook phase.
- / (slash): Symbol for spare.
- Sleeper: A pin positioned directly behind another pin after the first ball roll, specifically: the 8-pin behind the 2-pin, the 9-pin behind the 3-pin, or the 5-pin behind the 1-pin. The two pins are collectively called double wood. Also: "ninja pin".
- Slide step: The final step in a bowler's delivery, the step immediately following the pivot step.
- Solid reactive: a type of reactive resin ball having more microscopic reactive pores in its coverstock than pearl or hybrid balls, thus tending to hook earlier and less sharply.
- Solid 8 or Solid 9: Leaving the 8-pin (for right-handed releases) or 9-pin (for left-handed releases) on what appears to be a perfect pocket hit. This leave is caused by the ball finishing so well that it knocks the 5-pin straight back, missing the 8 or 9. Also called stone 8 or stone 9. Distinguish: a weak 8- or 9-pin, in which the ball deflects off the head pin too much and sends the 5-pin to the outside of the 8- or 9-pin.
- Solid 10: A ringing 10.
- Sombrero: Less common term for a 4-bagger (four consecutive strikes).
- Span: The distance between a ball's finger holes and the thumb hole. Distinguish: bridge.
- Spare: The scoring result in a frame in which the last of the ten pins is/are knocked down on the second roll of the frame. The term sometimes refers to the pins left standing after the first roll (example: "3-6-10 spare"). See conversion.

Spare-related terms: (Terms assume a right hand release, and white numbers represent standing pins.)

Dinner bucket Bucket if missing 8-pin	Double wood left or Sleeper #1	Double wood right or Sleeper #2
7 8 9 10; 4 5 6; 2 3; 1	7 8 9 10; 4 5 6; 2 3; 1	7 8 9 10; 4 5 6; 2 3; 1
Baby split	Christmas tree #1	Christmas tree #2
7 8 9 10; 4 5 6; 2 3; 1	7 8 9 10; 4 5 6; 2 3; 1	7 8 9 10; 4 5 6; 2 3; 1
Big Four	Greek Church (Big Five)	Goal (Fence- or Bed-) posts
7 8 9 10; 4 5 6; 2 3; 1	7 8 9 10; 4 5 6; 2 3; 1	7 8 9 10; 4 5 6; 2 3; 1
Dime store #1	Dime store #2	Lily, Sour apple
7 8 9 10; 4 5 6; 2 3; 1	7 8 9 10; 4 5 6; 2 3; 1	7 8 9 10; 4 5 6; 2 3; 1
Washout #1	Washout #2	Modern (Super) Washout
7 8 9 10; 4 5 6; 2 3; 1	7 8 9 10; 4 5 6; 2 3; 1	7 8 9 10; 4 5 6; 2 3; 1

Attempts to convert the 4-5-7 split (right-handed delivery using pearl coverstock bowling ball). Ball approaches at an angle to give the 4-pin enough forward momentum to contact the 7-pin. However, splitting the 4-5 gap too evenly sends the 4-pin sideways toward the gutter without contacting the 7-pin.

- Sparrow: Three spares in a row. Also: "chicken".
- Speed: Abbreviation for ball speed.
- Speed-dominant: Adjective describing a release with a too-high release ratio, in which the ratio of ball speed to rev rate is too high, causing the ball to reach the pins while still in the hook phase, causing unnecessarily low entry angle and increased ball deflection. Opposite of rev-dominant.
- Spin: Misnomer for axis rotation.
- Spinner: A bowler or bowling style imparting a high axis tilt causing the ball to spin like a top, thus promoting greater length before hooking. The term spinner also refers to a mechanical device in which a ball is quickly rotated while abrasives are pressed or polishes are applied, in order to change surface characteristics of the ball's coverstock.

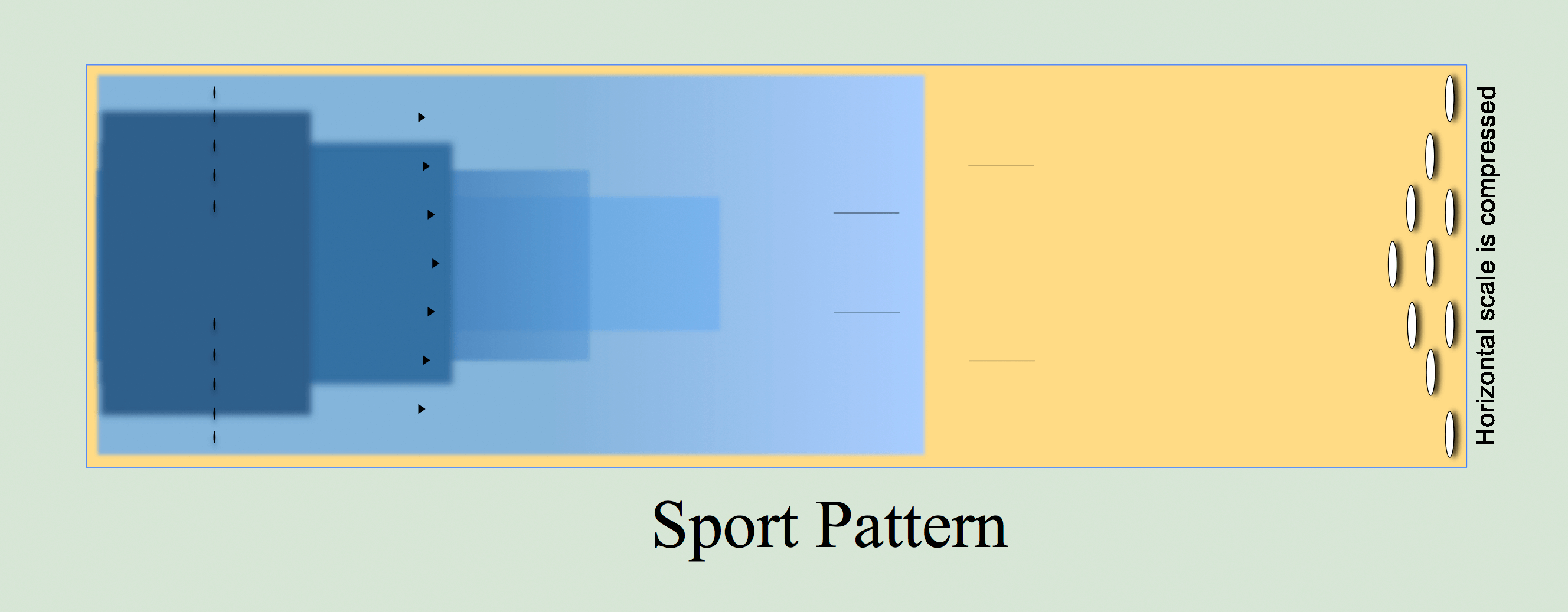
Conceptual diagram of a sport pattern (Horizontal scale is compressed)

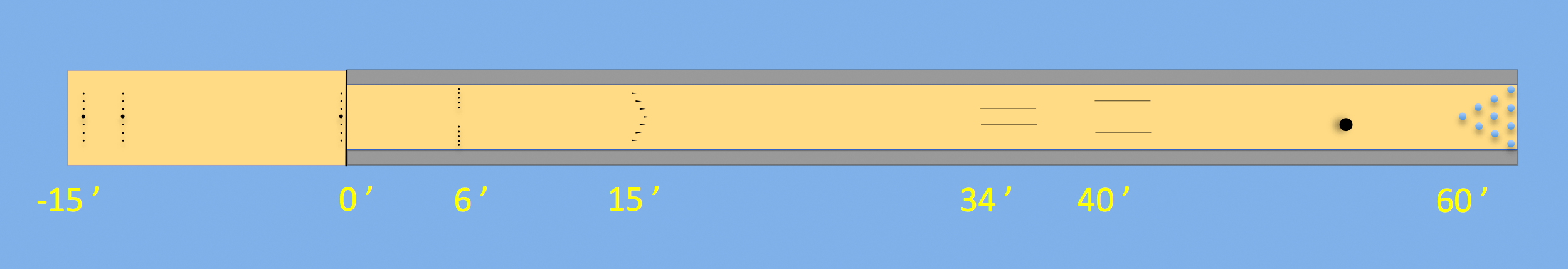
Spots (at 6 feet), arrows (at 15 feet), and downlane markers (at about 34-43 feet) can be used for targeting (aiming).

String pinsetter operation, from a patent issued in 2024

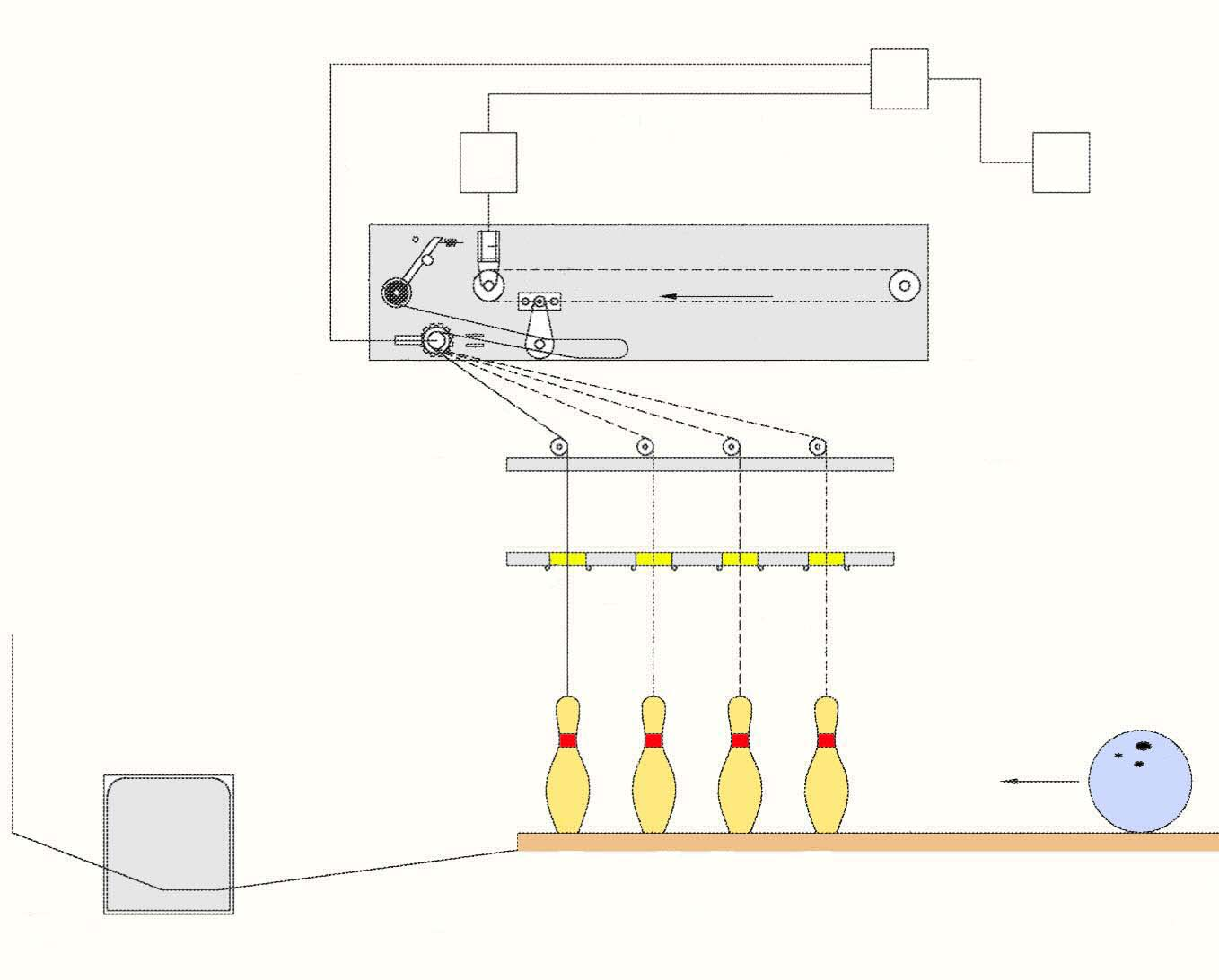
1) Ball approaches pins that strings have lowered into place.

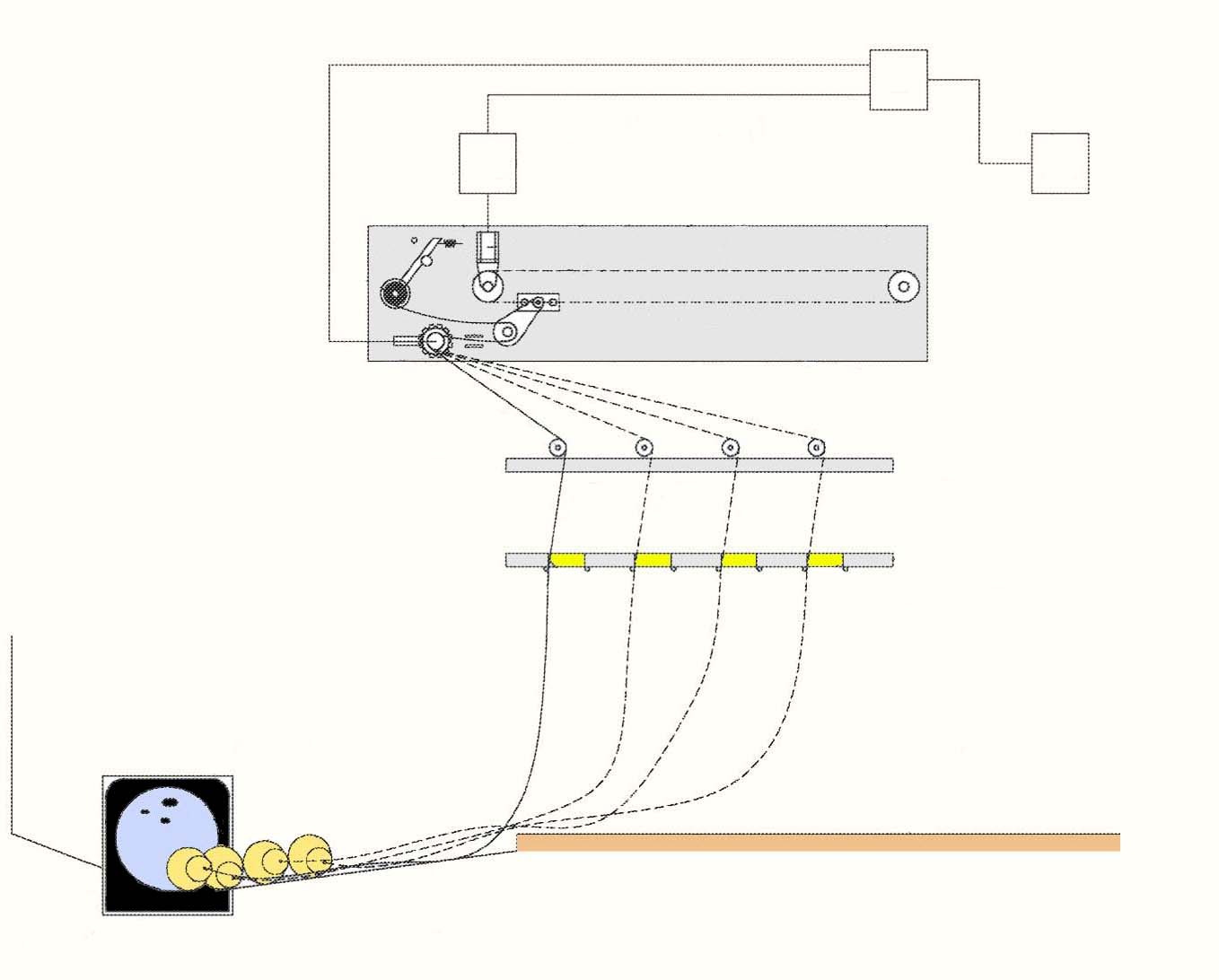
2) Ball knocks pins into a pit and exits to a ball return mechanism.

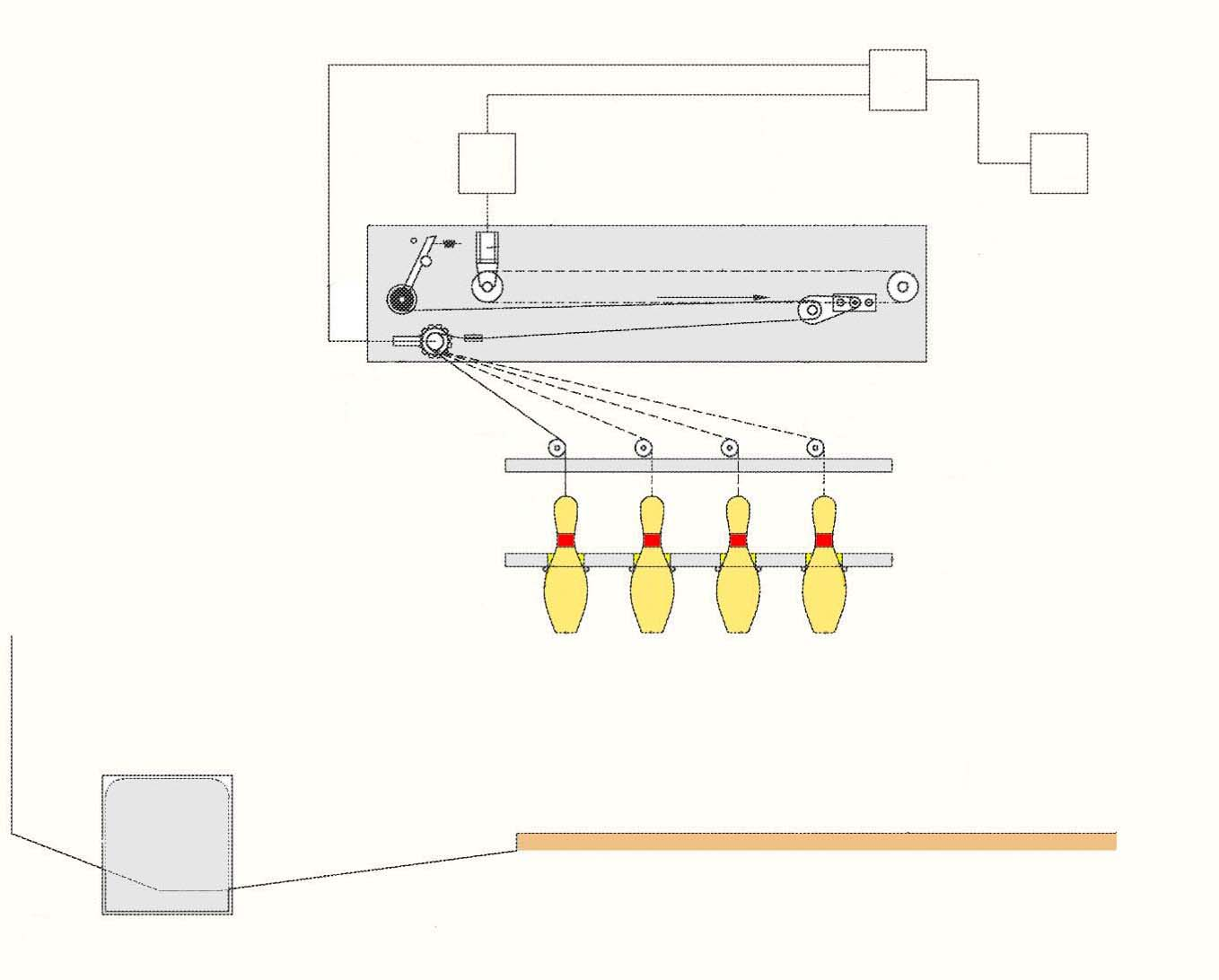
3) Strings retract the pins from the pit so they can be lowered into place.

- External video
- YouTube short: String pinsetter operation

- Split: A spare leave in which the head pin is knocked down but at least two non-adjacent pins remain standing with a gap between them. Example: the 9-10 leave (non-adjacent pins) is a split, but the 6-10 leave (adjacent pins) is not a split. Distinguish: washout.
- Splitting the 8 and 9: A flush strike in which the ball contacts the 1-3-5-8-9 pins (for a right-handed release). Because modern ball technology enables higher entry angles, some coaches consider splitting the 8 and 9 to be a "perfect strike" hit as opposed to the 1-3-5-9, since the ball hits more pins.
- Sport pattern or sport shot: One of a number of challenging oil patterns customarily used in competitive matches and professional events, in which the distribution of oil laterally across the lane is "flat" (relatively evenly distributed) so as to provide little assistance in guiding the ball toward the pocket. Sport patterns patterns can be 32–52 feet long, a larger range than the 38-42 feet of the less challenging typical house shots (THSs).
- Spots: A set of alignment dots located about six feet beyond the foul line, usable in spot bowling for targeting (aiming).
- Spot bowl (spot bowling): Verb (noun). To execute a delivery while targeting (visually focusing on) the spots six feet beyond the foul line, or more broadly: targeting other markers (such as the arrows or breakpoint) that are nearer than the pins themselves.
- Stance: The stable initial body position before the approach begins, including ball and hand/arm position, posture, and alignment of feet, knees, hips and shoulders.
- Star frame: Frame in which all bowlers scored strike.
- Stay(ing) down (on a shot): Retaining a stable and balanced position at the foul line after delivery without raising up one's body; distinguished from pulling away or standing up. See also: Post(ing) a shot. The practice is designed to ensure consistent delivery.
- Stepladder final: A variant of the single-elimination tournament format in which the lowest-ranked finalist is first paired against the second-lowest-ranked finalist, the winner advancing to oppose the third-lowest-ranked finalist in a second game, the winner of which advances to oppose the fourth-lowest-ranked finalist, and so forth, through a final match involving the highest-ranked finalist. See diagram for tournament.
- Stick: A pin, a count, or a specific pin number. Examples: "down 20 sticks" or "leave a 10-stick." Also: "wood".
- Steener: A strike in which the ball misses the head pin but pin action knocks it down. Also: "backwash", "backdoor strike". Alternative definition: a 1-pin leave.
- Stone 8 or Stone 9: See solid 8 or solid 9.
- Straight ball: A ball that travels a relatively straight path, without hooking substantially. Because of their low hook potential, polyester (plastic) balls are often chosen as straight balls for converting certain spares.
- Strike: (Noun, verb) Scoring result for a frame in which all ten pins are knocked down on the first roll.
- Strike out: To roll consecutive strikes from a certain frame through the end of a game. Also: "going (off the) sheet", "going to the wall", or "punching out".
- String bowling: Bowling using a pinsetter connected to the pins by black cords that retract the pins after a roll. Approved by the USBC in 2023, string pinsetters are designed to reduce maintenance costs compared to traditional freefall pinsetters that have a more complex mechanism for gathering and arranging pins into racks for lowering.
- Stroker: A bowler with a style emphasizing control and repeatability over power. Compare: cranker.

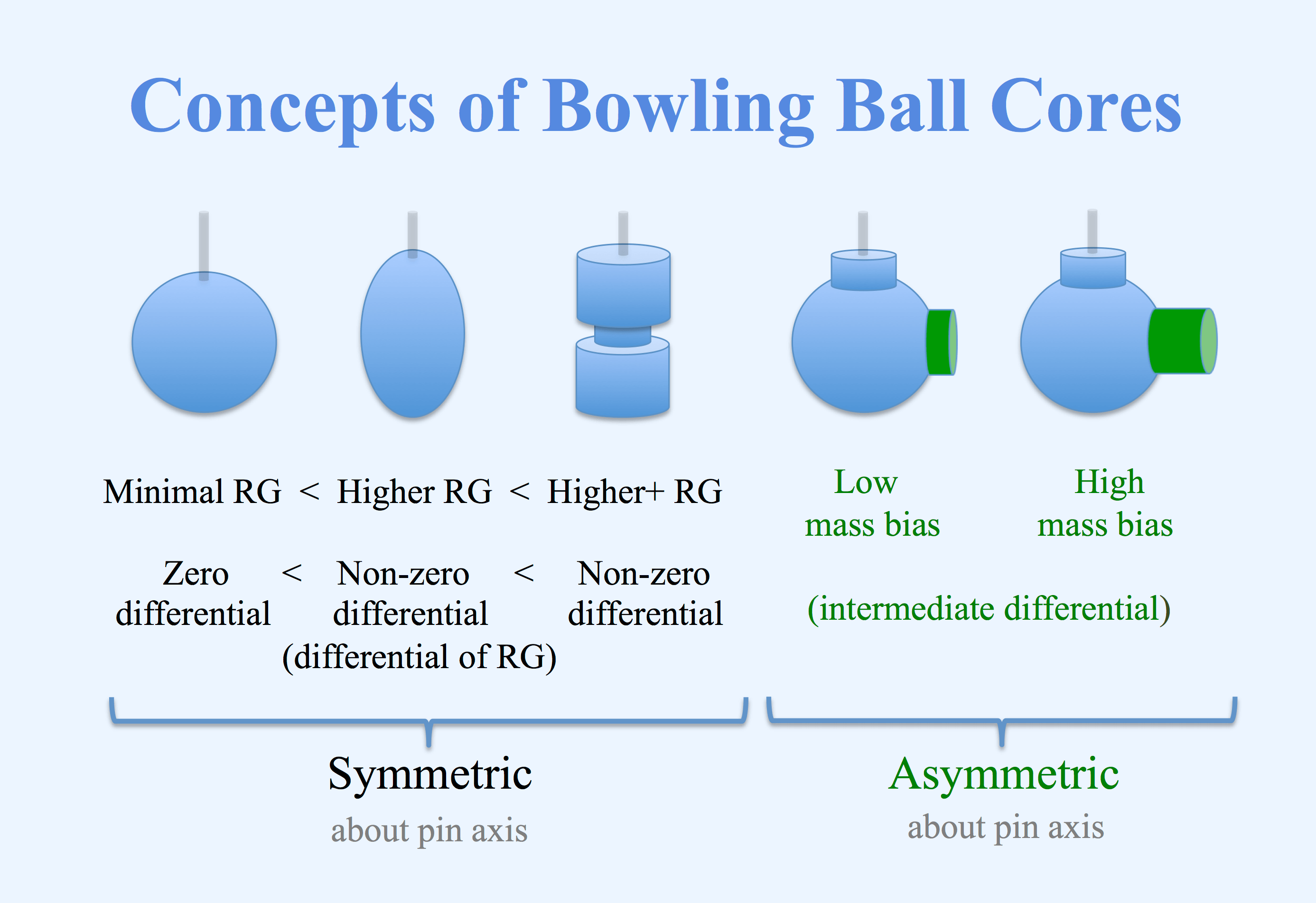
Bowling ball core ("weight block") technical specifications include RG, differential of RG, intermediate differential, and (a)symmetry. Symmetric balls do not have values of intermediate differential.

- Strong: Adjective characterizing a ball (or its coverstock, layout, core design, etc.) as beginning to hook earlier and more smoothly, and experience less downlane sideways motion than a weak ball. Strong is the opposite of weak. Since coverstock is the dominant determinant of ball motion, usually dull balls tend to be stronger balls and shiny balls tend to be weaker balls. The term is sometimes described (incorrectly, according to some sources) in a second definition to indicate a larger overall hook potential. The first definition concentrates on length whereas the second definition concentrates on overall left-right motion.
- Suitcase grip, Suitcase release: A grip or release of the bowling ball in which the thumb continuously points inward (left, for a right-handed release) and the fingers continuously point outward. Distinguished from grips and releases in which the fingers are "behind the ball" (on the part of the ball furthest from the pins), which is characteristic of the forward roll.
- Swing path: The path the ball takes on the forward swing (from the top of the backswing to just after the ball is released). Swing path determines the delivery angle (the ball's initial trajectory toward the sight target).
- Symmetric: Adjective describing a ball whose RG (radius of gyration) values along the Y (high RG) and Z (intermediate RG) axes do not differ by more than 5% of total differential. Symmetric balls react more smoothly but less aggressively in the back end, and thus have lower flare potential (hook potential). Opposite of asymmetric. Adjective is also applied to the core itself.
- Synthetic: Adjective describing a material other than wood, usually applied to pins or lane surfaces.

== T ==
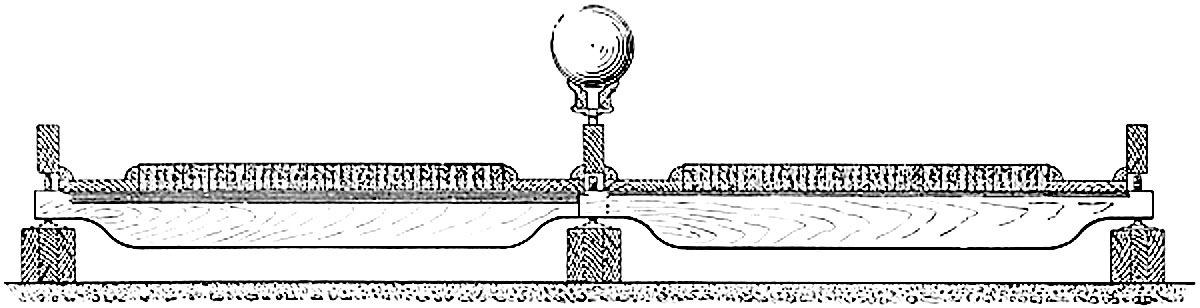
Adjusting screws placed on the sides of these circa 1895 bowling lanes design allow adjustment of lane topography.

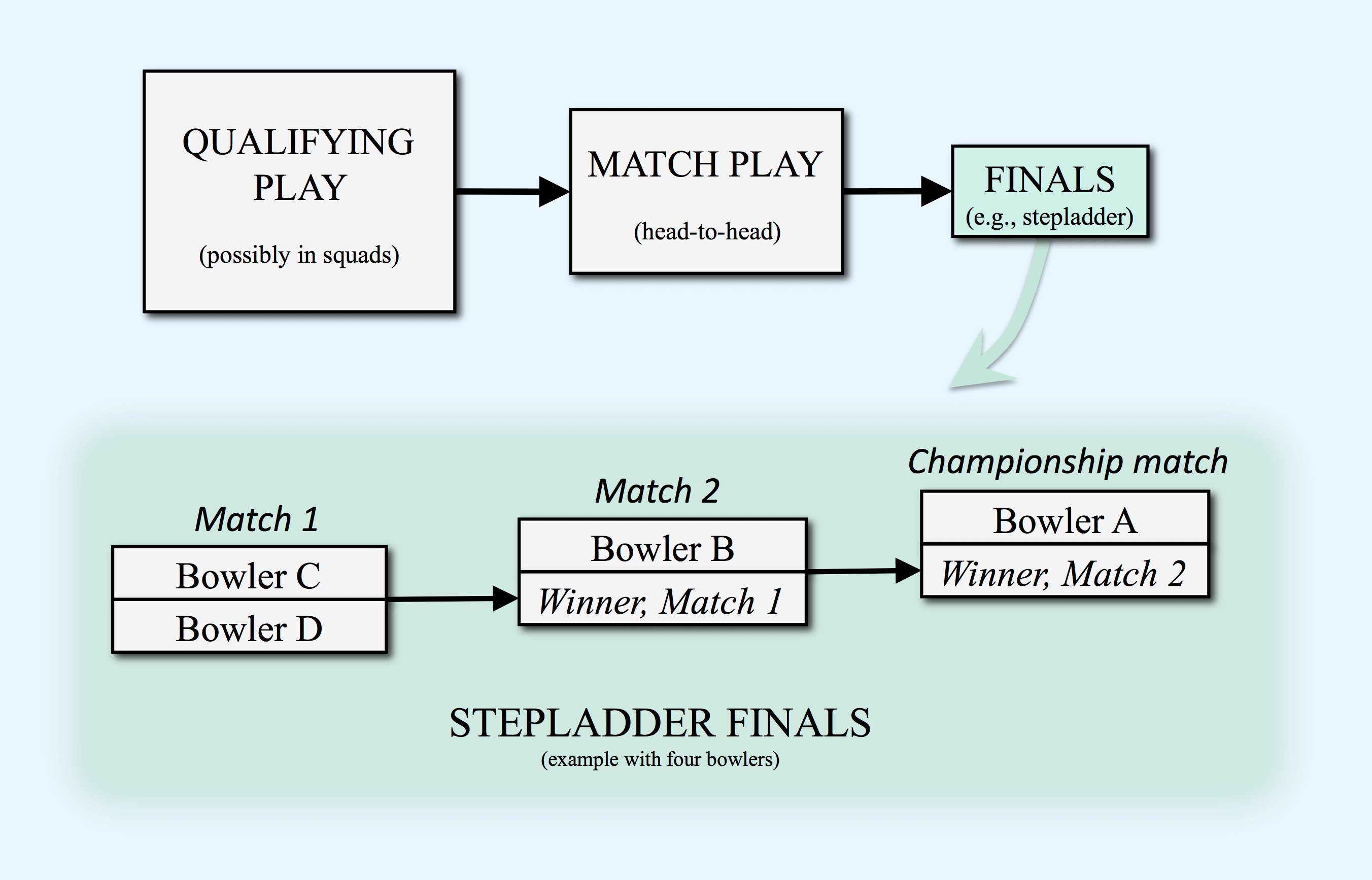
Conceptual diagram of a professional tournament. Entrants not eliminated in qualifying rounds go on to compete in match play, which determines seeding (initial ranking) for the final matches, which in PBA tournaments have often been televised stepladder finals.

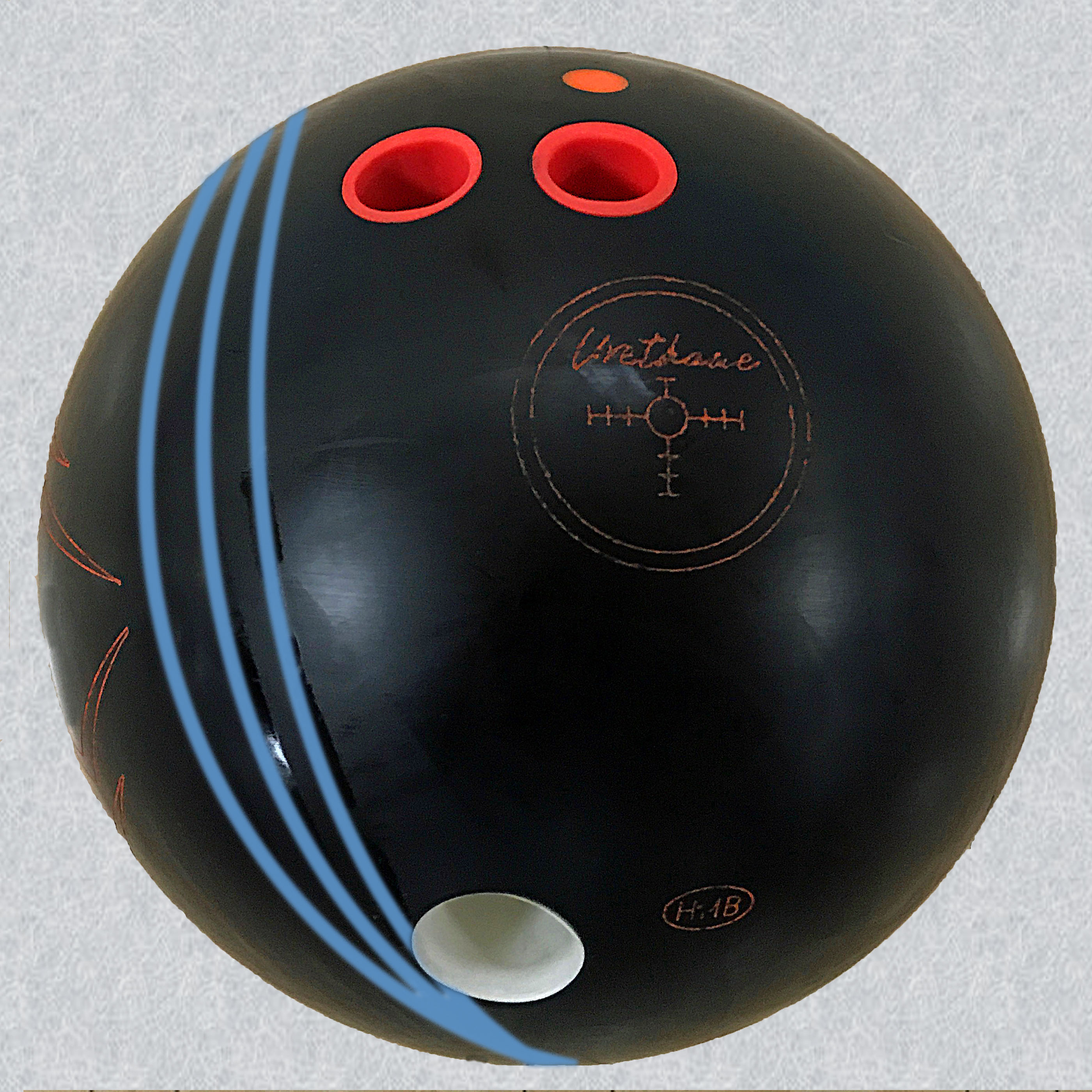
Track flare is progression of the ball's oil track (simulated in blue) reflecting migration of the ball's axis of rotation on successive revolutions.

- Tap: Differing definitions: (a) modern use: a first roll leaving only a single pin standing (comes from "9 pin no-tap" scoring, which counts such frames as strikes); or (b) historical use: a solid pocket hit that leaves a single pin, usually in the back row.
- Tape: (bowling accessory tape) Adhesive tape applied in bowling ball holes (especially thumb holes), or directly to thumb or fingers, to adjust the fit, in order to promote consistent and comfortable release of the ball.
- Target: (noun or verb) A point, usually at or near the arrows, on which bowlers focus their eyes, ideally during approach and follow-through. Most experienced bowlers consider it inadvisable to "target" (aim at) the pins. See sighting and spot bowl.
- Team USA: The U.S. national bowling team. See USA Bowling.
- Tempo: The rate at which a bowler takes footsteps during the approach.
- Ten in the pit: An informal term, usually conveying excitement, describing a strike in which all ten pins are knocked from the pin deck into the pit.
- Ten pin up rule: A rule to choose the average that determines a bowler's handicap for a competition. For example, USBC Rule 319a(2) states that "When the previous season’s average is used, and at the time of bowling an entrant has a current average for 21 or more games that is 10 pins or more higher than the prior season’s average, the current average must be used." Rule 319a provides that competition management may declare that the rule does not apply.
- THS: Typical house shot.
- Tiger beer frame:^{[Questionable]} Similar to Beer Frame except the strikes bridge two frames. Example: 4th and 5th bowlers strike in one frame, and 1st and 3rd strike in the ensuing frame, thus "hanging" the 2nd bowler. Derived from Tiger Grand Slam.^{[Questionable]}
- Tight (lane): A lane whose conditions reduce or delay hooking, such as through heavy application of oil or a long oil pattern. Tight lanes are thought to provide a smaller margin for error.
- Tilt: See axis tilt.
- Timing: A characterization of the time the hand releases the ball compared to the time the sliding foot slides. See early timing and late timing.
- Timmy:^{[Questionable]} Nickname for the 7 pin, or right-handed releases that knock down only the 7 pin. TIM is an acronym for Tenpin in the Mirror.
- Topography: Lane surface physical characteristics, or more specifically: a map showing deviations away from being planar (flat and smooth), continuous and level, especially if beyond specified tolerances.
- Tournament: A contest among a large number of bowlers. Some larger (and most professional) tournaments start with qualifying rounds that determine who goes on to compete in match play, which determines seeding (initial ranking) for the final matches which are usually stepladder finals.
- Tracks: Bowtie-shaped rings of oil left on a bowling ball after a shot, indicating where the ball contacted the lane. Track also denotes a ball's path down the lane. See also: track flare.
- Track flare: Progression of the ball's oil track reflecting migration of the ball's axis of rotation on successive revolutions. Track flare exposes dry ball surface to the lane with each revolution, to thus increase friction and enhance ball reaction. Distinguish this track flare phenomenon from a ball's flare potential.
- Transition: See lane transition.
- Turkey: Three consecutive strikes within a single game.
- Turkey sandwich: A turkey preceded and followed by spares.
- Turn(ing) the ball: To apply axis rotation, sometimes called side rotation. Motion of modern bowling balls is thought to be better controlled using finger rotation without elbow rotation.
- Turn finger: The ring finger, so named because when positioned behind the ball and turning it slightly at delivery, increases axis rotation and axis tilt. Compare: roll finger.
- Tweener: A style of delivery between stroker and cranker.
- Twister: Early name for cranker, heard in older PBA TV commentary.
- Typical house pattern: See typical house shot.

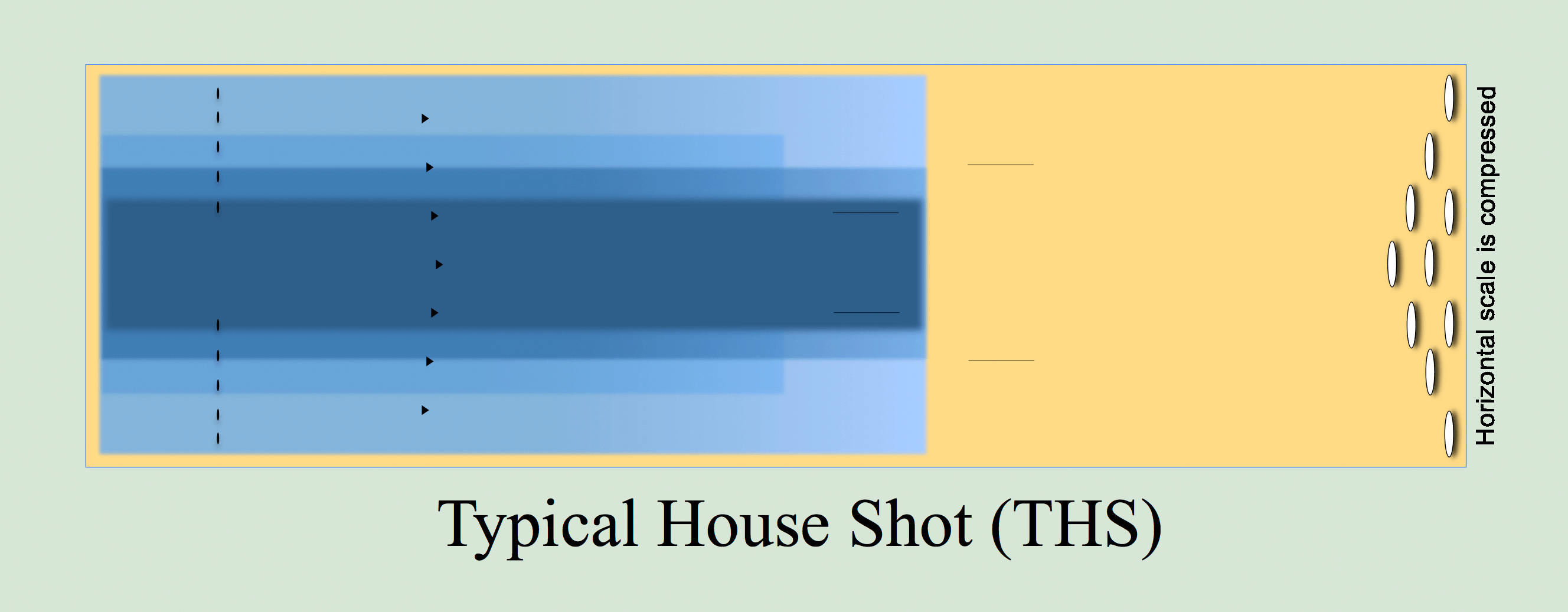
Conceptual diagram of a typical house shot (THS) oil pattern (Horizontal scale is compressed)

- Typical house shot (THS) or Typical house pattern. One of a number of oil patterns commonly used to help non-sport league bowlers achieve more strikes. The patterns generally have larger oil concentrations near the centerline (to let balls slide directly toward the pocket) and lower oil concentrations nearer the channels (to help balls hook toward the pocket). THS oil patterns are typically 38–42 feet long, a smaller range than the 32–52 feet of sport shots. Distinguish: Sport shot.

== U ==
- Uncoiled (wrist): Wrist position in which palm is in an open position (butt of the palm facing outward and forward, away from the forearm). Recommended releases involve uncoiling the wrist from a closed position (coiled) position during the early part of the forward swing.
- Unit (of oil): A volume of oil (lane conditioner) applied to a lane, usually expressed milliliters (mL). The total number of units applied to a lane, divided by the length of the oil pattern, determines the average thickness of the oil on the pattern.
- Urethane: Informal adaptation of the proper term polyurethane, applied to ball coverstocks. Balls with urethane coverstocks provide less angular hooking motion than reactive resin balls.
- Uneven frames: Marking (achieving a spare or strike) in every other frame. Distinguish: Dutch 200.
- USA Bowling: Formed in 1989 to represent the sport as the national governing body and supporting Team USA, the national team. USA Bowling merged in 2005 with other organizations to form the United States Bowling Congress (USBC).
- USBC: United States Bowling Congress, the standards and rules governing organization for ten-pin bowling in the United States, formed in 2005 from a merger of the American Bowling Congress (ABC) (founded in 1895), the Women's International Bowling Congress (WIBC, 1916), the Young American Bowling Alliance (YABA, 1982), and (Team) USA Bowling (1989).

== V ==
- Vacancy (score): In league play, a score attributed to a position in the team roster that has not been filled. Distinguish: blind.
- Volume: An indication of the total amount of oil (lubricant) applied to a lane, usually expressed in milliliters (from under 18 ml to more than 25 ml). Other factors being equal, balls tend to hook further downlane on high-volume ("wet") lanes, and sooner on low-volume ("dry") lanes. Distinguish: length, which relates to the distance beyond the foul line over which the oil is distributed.

== W ==
- Wall (figurative term): a barrier preventing a ball from going on an undesirable path. Usually, a wall is an area of a lane having reduced oil concentration (greater friction) that causes balls to curve more strongly and not pass through the wall. Strategically, a wall may be developed as bowlers open the lane during the course of a bowling session.
- Wall shot: A strike involving a light pocket hit and pins (especially the headpin) bouncing off the side wall(s). See also: mixer.
- Washout: A leave in which at least two non-adjacent pins remain standing, but in which the head pin is still standing to disqualify it from being a split.
- Weak: See explanation of strong, which is the opposite of weak.
- Weak 8 or Weak 9. Leaving the 8-pin (for right-handed releases) or 9-pin (for left-handed releases) when the ball deflects off the head pin too much and sends the 5-pin to the outside of the 8- or 9-pin. Distinguish: solid 8 or solid 9.
- Weight block: See core.
- Weight hole: See balance hole.
- Wet/dry: See over/under.
- WIBC: Women's International Bowling Congress, the governing organization for women's bowling, formed in 1916 as a counterpart to the male-only ABC, and merged in 2005 with other organizations to form the United States Bowling Congress (USBC).
- Wide: Adjective describing a ball path that is outside (to the right for right-handed deliveries). Wide sometimes connotes a ball path that is further outside than desired, as in "my last ball went wide".
- Wrist: In bowling, wrist denotes the way the bowler's wrist is bent during release. Example: "using less wrist" denotes positioning the wrist further away from a cupped position, resulting in a milder hook.
- Wrap 10: A ringing 10.
- Wrist brace or Wrist guard or Wrist positioner or Wrist support: A device fitted to the wrist and back of the hand to hold the wrist in a desired position, often with the goal of increasing side rotation and hook by preventing the wrist from unintentionally "breaking" during delivery.
- Wrist lag: Part of a delivery technique in which the ball is first cradled and then the wrist is uncoiled so the fingers apply a snapping action to the ball. Wrist lag is used to increase rev rate.
- Wombat: A spare achieved after rolling a gutter ball on the first roll.

== X ==
- X: Symbol for strike.

== Y ==
- YABA: Young American Bowling Alliance, serving bowlers under age 22. Previously the American Junior Bowling Congress, YABA was formed in 1982 and in 2005 merged with other organizations to form the United States Bowling Congress (USBC).
- Yahtzee: Five consecutive strikes in the same game, named after the popular dice game.

Examples of historic bowling glossaries

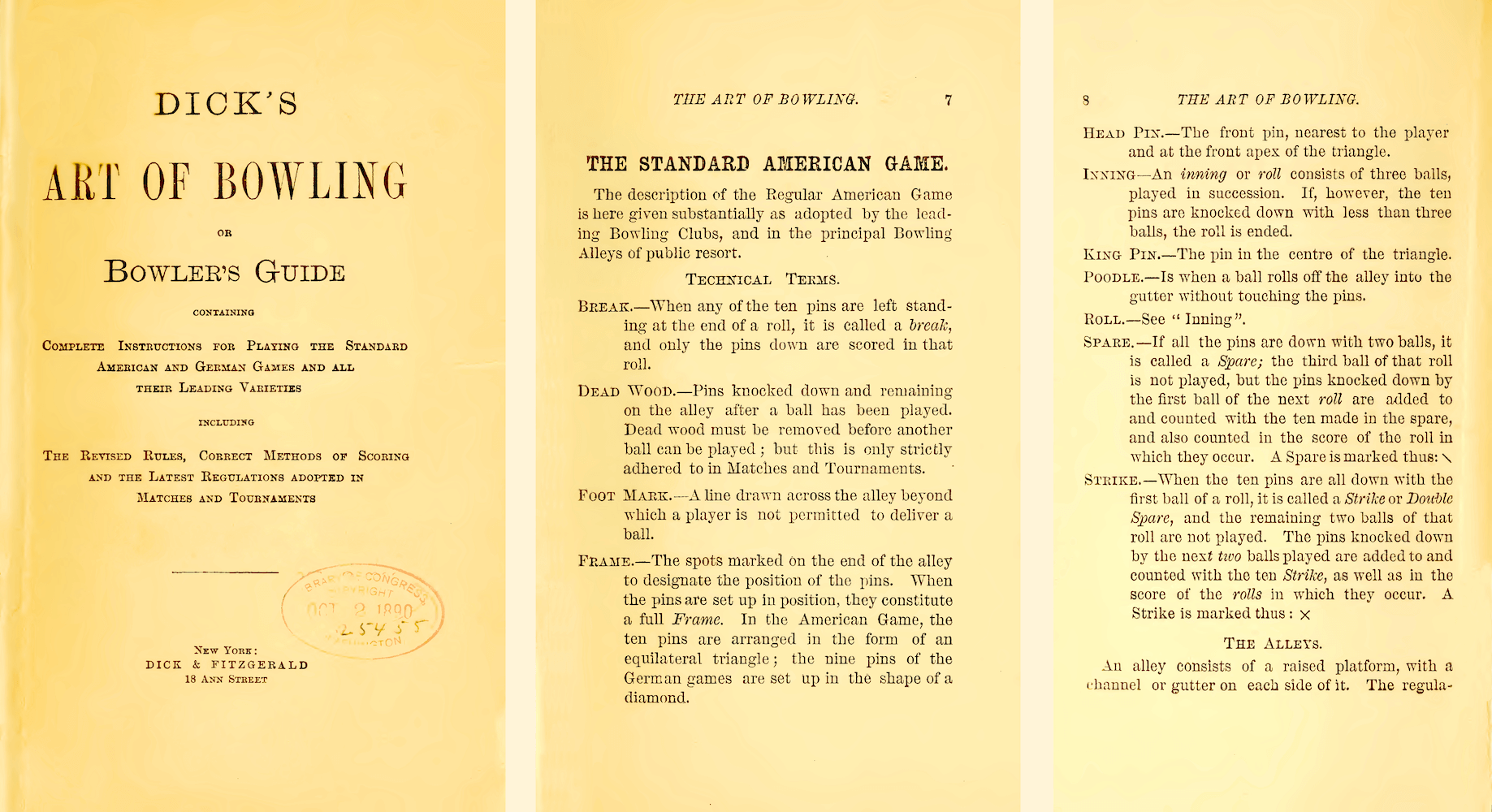
"Technical Terms" from a Bowler's Guide published in New York in 1890, when "innings" or "rolls" consisted of three balls played in succession.

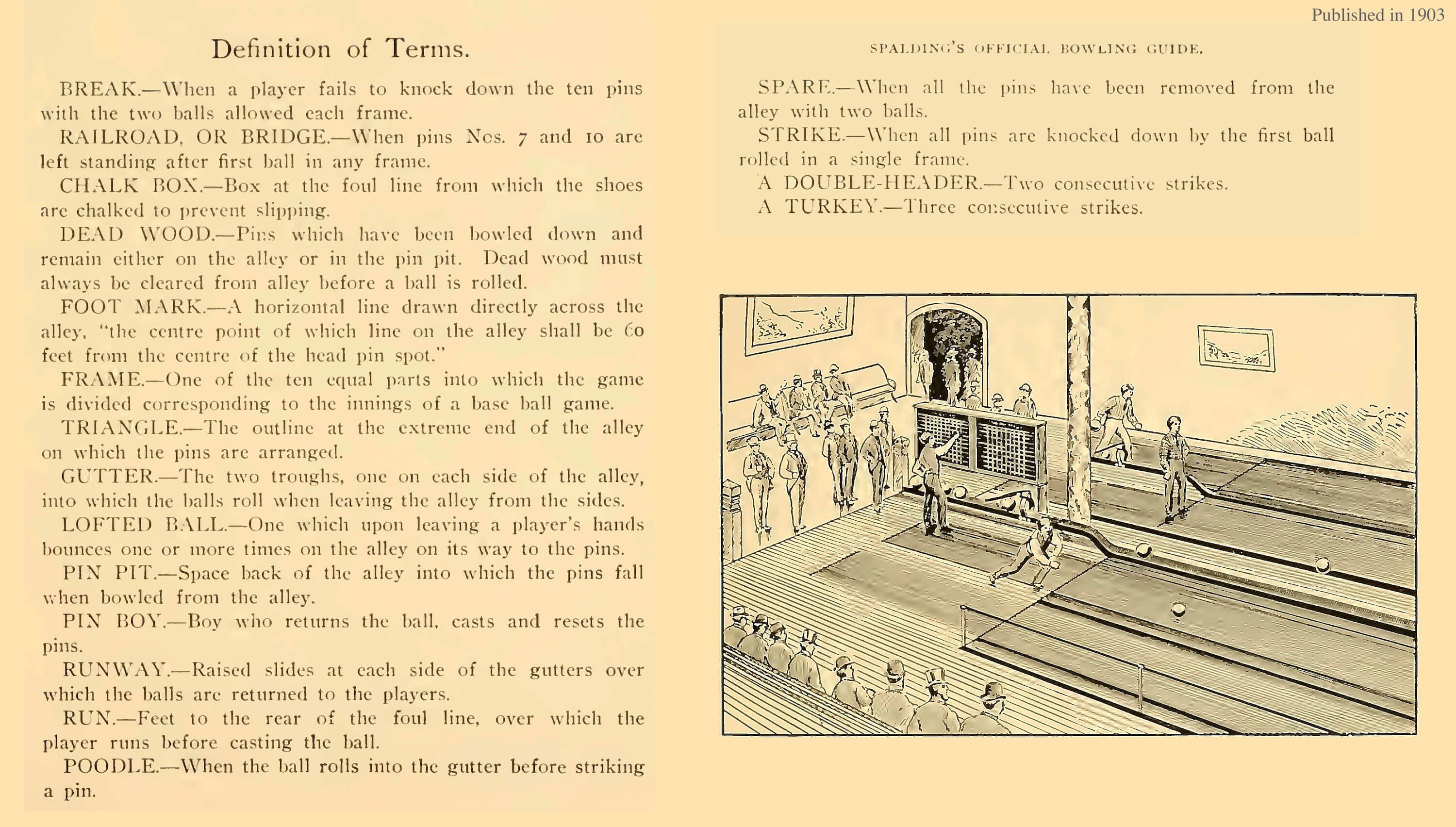
"Definition of Terms" in Spalding's Official Bowling Guide (1903), by which time only two rolls per frame were allowed

== Links to other online glossaries ==
- "Bowling Terms". BowlersMart.com (BowlersMart). 2020. Archived from the original on March 24, 2020.
- "Bowling Lingo". PBA.com (Professional Bowlers Association). 2010. Archived from the original on November 30, 2016.
- "Technical Terms" (PDF). Bowl.com (United States Bowling Congress, USBC). May 2009. Archived (PDF) from the original on October 8, 2018.
- Hoenig, Joe (August 2025). "Pin Perspectives: Bowlers Say the Strangest Things!". Bowling This Month. Archived from the original on 2 August 2025.
- Thompson, Ted (March 20, 2010). "Bowling Terms and Glossary". Kegel.net (Kegel LLC). Archived from the original on July 5, 2018.
- "Bowling Terminology". BowlingBall.com (Bowlversity educational section). November 2005. Archived from the original on October 4, 2016.
- "Common Bowling Ball Terms". BowlingBall.com (Bowlversity educational section). June 1, 2012. Archived from the original on July 22, 2023.
- "Common Bowling Lane Terms". BowlingBall.com (Bowlversity educational section). October 2012. Archived from the original on October 1, 2016.
- "Understanding Key Terms Used In Bowling Pro Shops". BowlingBall.com (Bowlversity educational section). July 27, 2015. Archived from the original on September 7, 2015.
- "The PRS Of Bowling Terminology". BowlingBall.com. Archived from the original on October 26, 2019.
- "Bowling Term Glossary". Bowling.com. Archived from the original on January 21, 2019.
- "Bowling Glossary". Bowling2u.com. 17 December 2018. Archived from the original on May 7, 2019.
- "The Bowler's Bowling Dictionary". tripod.com. Archived from the original on April 18, 2021.

== Other sources ==
- Freeman, James; Hatfield, Ron (July 15, 2018). "Glossary". Bowling Beyond the Basics: What's Really Happening on the Lanes, and What You Can Do about It. BowlSmart. ISBN 978-1 73 241000 8.
- Rich, Carrubba (August 24, 2011). "How Long Are Bowling Lanes". BowlingBall.com (Bowlversity educational section). Archived from the original on September 9, 2015. (review of lane specifications and dimensions)
